= List of performances of French grand operas at the Paris Opéra =

The following list gives number of performances of grand opera at the Paris Opera from premiere to 1962, (as given by Stéphane Wolff, Albert Soubies and other sources).

Work	Premiere	Number of performances	Last performance
La muette de Portici, (Auber)	1828	489	1882
Guillaume Tell, (Rossini)	1829	911	1930
Robert le diable (Meyerbeer)	1831	751	1892; revived in 1984
Gustave III (Auber)	1833	168	1853
La Juive (Fromental Halévy)	1835	534	1934; revived in 2007
Les Huguenots (Meyerbeer)	1836	1120	1936; revived in 2018
Stradella (Niedermeyer)	1837		1840 (in 3-act form)
Guido et Ginevra (Halévy)	1838		revived in 1840 (in 4-act form); revived again in 1870
Le lac des fées (Auber)	1839	30
La favorite (originally titled L'ange de Nisida) (Donizetti)	1840
Les martyrs (French version of Poliuto) (Donizetti)	1840	20	1842
La reine de Chypre (Halévy)	1841	152	1878
Charles VI (Halévy)	1843	61	1850
Dom Sébastien (Donizetti)	1843	33	1849
Marie Stuart (Niedermeyer)	1844		1846; revived in 2002
Jérusalem (Verdi)	1847	20	1849
Le prophète (Meyerbeer)	1849	573	1912
L'enfant prodigue (Auber)	1850
Le Juif errant (Halévy)	1852	49	1853
Les vêpres siciliennes (Verdi)	1855	81	1864
La reine de Saba (Gounod)	1862	15	1862
L'Africaine (Meyerbeer)	1865	484	1902
Don Carlos (Verdi)	1867	81	1864
Hamlet (Thomas)	1868	384	1938
Le roi de Lahore (Massenet)	1877	57	1879
Polyeucte (Gounod)	1878	29	1879
Henry VIII (Saint-Saëns)	1883	87	1919
Le Cid (Massenet)	1885	152	1919
Patrie! (Paladilhe)	1886	93	1919
