= Léon Pillet =

French journalist and civil servant (1803–1868)

Léon Pillet (6 December 1803 – 20 March 1868) was a French journalist, civil servant, and director of the Paris Opera from 1840 to 1847. A political appointee, he was probably the least successful director of the Paris Opera in the 19th century.

== Early life and training ==
Born Raymond-François-Léon Pillet in Paris, he was the son of Fabien Pillet (1772–1855), who was a journalist and French administrator. After attending the Lycée Napoléon (now the Lycée Henri-IV), Léon Pillet continued his studies in law and joined the offices of an attorney by the name of Mauguin.

== Journalist ==
He took part in the founding of the Nouveau Journal de Paris in 1827, serving mainly as its drama critic. Later, when the suppression of the privileges of the major journals gave more leeway to the enterprise, he became its editor, transforming it into a political newspaper and embracing the liberal cause. In July 1830 he signed the journalists' protest against government restrictions on the press, and during the three days 26, 27, and 28 July, his journal, now known simply as the Journal de Paris, was published several times each day. Having supported the change to a more conservative government which occurred on 13 March 1831, the paper was taken over by venture capitalists who were favorable to the new regime, but Pillet stayed on as director and supported ministerial policies.

== Civil servant ==
In 1834 Pillet received a government post as maître des requêtes en service extraordinaire and appears in the Almanach royal beginning in 1836 as the Royal Commissioner and Secretary of the Special Commission for the Conservatoire and Royal Theatres. In this position Pillet was the administrator with responsibility for the Paris Opera.

== Librettist ==
Pillet also had aspirations as a librettist. During his time as commissioner, he cowrote the libretto for the 3-act opera La vendetta with Adolphe Vannois, for which Henri de Ruolzl provided the music. The work was produced at the Opera on 11 September 1839, but was poorly received. It was withdrawn after its seventh performance on 11 October for revision and was compressed to two acts. On 22 January 1840 it was performed in its new version on a double-bill with the 3-act ballet La Somnambule, but ticket sales came to a paltry 1,237 francs and 30 centimes, and it was dropped, after its sixth performance in its revised form on 1 May 1840. Pillet by this time had also written libretti for a series of vaudevilles.

== Director of the Paris Opera ==
On 1 June 1840, as a political favor, Pillet, who was "neither an artist nor a true entrepreneur", was appointed to a co-directorship of the Paris Opera, where he joined the already resident director, Henri Duponchel. The two men quarreled, and Duponchel withdrew in October 1841, leaving Pillet as sole director, which probably led the German composer Richard Wagner to say that the Opera was run by "political appointees, as a reward." Wagner sold Pillet the sketch of his opera The Flying Dutchman for 500 francs, but was unable to convince him that the music was worth producing. Pillet used Wagner's idea to produce a new opera, Le vaisseau fantôme, with music by Pierre-Louis Dietsch (libretto by Paul Foucher), which failed to please.

Rosine Stoltz, the leading mezzo-soprano at the Paris Opera, became Pillet's mistress, and he began to insist that every opera should have a starring role for her. This eventually caused dissension within the company and a scandal. Pillet may have had a child with Stoltz, if one is to believe the Escudier brothers' La france musicale (April 1843), which reported that they had gone to Le Havre: "Mme Stoltz is suffering from an indisposition which would require nine months to recover from."

On top of this, both the most successful librettist of the day, Eugène Scribe, who blamed Pillet for the continued failure to mount Donizetti's unfinished Le duc d'Albe, and the most successful composer, Giacomo Meyerbeer, who did not want to cast Stoltz in his new opera Le prophète, declined to work with Pillet after 1845. Pillet was attacked by the press and suffered financial losses at the theater.

Pillet invited Giuseppe Verdi to compose an opera for the company in November 1845 and February 1846, but Verdi declined. Within a week of Verdi's arrival in Paris on 27 July 1847, Duponchel and Nestor Roqueplan joined Pillet as co-directors (31 July 1847), and Verdi received his first commission from the company, agreeing to adapt I Lombardi to a new French libretto with the title Jérusalem. Pillet was forced to retire from his directorship in October or November, and Verdi's "new" opera premiered on 26 November.

=== List of premieres ===
During Pillet's directorship of the Paris Opera, the following works were premiered:

- Giselle (28 June 1841), 2-act fantastic ballet with music by Adolphe Adam (additional music by Friedrich Burgmüller) and choreography by Jean Coralli and Jules Perrot
- La reine de Chypre (22 December 1841), 5-act grand opera by Fromental Halévy
- Le guerillero (22 June 1842), 2-act opera by Ambroise Thomas
- La jolie fille de Gand (22 June 1842), 3-act pantomime-ballet with music by Adam and choreography by Albert
- Le vaisseau fantôme, ou Le maudit des mers (9 November 1842), 2-act opera by Pierre-Louis Dietsch
- Charles VI (15 March 1843), 5-act grand opera by Halévy
- La Péri (17 July 1843), 2-act fantastic ballet with music by Burgmüller and choreography by Coralli
- Dom Sébastien (13 November 1843), 5-act grand opera by Gaetano Donizetti
- Lady Henriette ou la servante de Greenwich (1 February 1844), 3-act pantomime ballet with music by Friedrich von Flotow (Act 1), Burgmüller (Act 2), and Edouard Deldevez (Act 3), and choreography by Joseph Mazilier
- Le lazzarone, ou Le bien vient en dormant (29 March 1844), 2-act opera by Halévy
- Eucharis (7 August 1844), 2-act pantomime-ballet with music by Deldevez and choreography by Coralli
- Othello (2 September 1844), 3-act opera by Gioachino Rossini, translated by Alphonse Royer and Gustave Vaëz
- Richard en Palestine (7 October 1844), 3-act opera by Adam
- Marie Stuart (6 December 1844), 5-act grand opera by Louis Niedermeyer
- Le diable à quatre (11 August 1845), 2-act pantomime-ballet with music by Adam and choreography by Mazilier
- L'étoile de Séville (7 December 1845), 4-act grand opera by Michael Balfe
- Lucie de Lammermoor (20 February 1846), 4-act opera by Donizetti
- Moïse au Mont Sinai (23 March 1846), oratorio by Félicien David
- Paquita (1 April 1846), 2-act pantomime-ballet with music by Deldevez and choreography by Mazilier
- Le roi David (3 June 1846), 3-act opera by Auguste Mermet
- L'âme en peine (29 June 1846), 2-act opera by Flotow
- Betty (10 July 1846), 2-act ballet with music by Thomas and choreography by Mazilier
- Robert Bruce (30 December 1846), 3-act pastiche opera with music by Rossini
- Ozaï (26 April 1847), 2-act pantomime-ballet with music by Casimir Gide and choreography by Coralli
- La bouquetière (31 May 1847), 1-act opera by Adam
- La Fille de marbre (20 October 1847), 2-act pantomime-ballet with music by Cesare Pugni and choreography by Arthur Saint-Léon
- Jérusalem (26 November 1847), 4-act grand opera by Giuseppe Verdi (premiered shortly after Pillet's retirement)

== Later career ==
In 1849 Pillet was appointed the French consul to Nice, where he remained until 1861, when he became the consul to Palermo, and subsequently the consul to Venice. He died in Venice.
