= Paul Barroilhet =

French operatic baritone

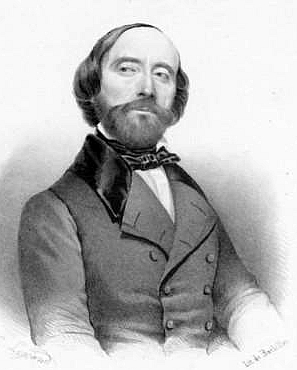
Paul Barroilhet

Paul-Bernard Barroilhet (French: [pɔl bɛʁnaʁ baʁujɛ]; Occitan: Pau-Bernat Barroilhet [ˈpaw βeɾˈnad baruˈʎet]; 22 September 1810 in Bayonne – April 1871 in Paris) was a French operatic baritone.

== Career ==
Barroilhet was born in Bayonne. He studied at the Conservatoire de Paris and then with David Banderali in Milan. He began his career in Italy during the early 1830s, performing under the name Paolo Barroilhet and making a name for himself as an exceptional singer, particularly in Naples.

He returned to France in 1840 to join the roster of artists at the Opéra National de Paris, where he performed under his birth name. However, he left the Paris Opera in 1847 after differences with the company's management. The by now wealthy Bairrolhet elected to withdraw completely from the stage and he found a new vocation as a painter and art collector. He came out of retirement briefly for appearances in Madrid in 1851–1852, performing Don Carlo in Ernani.

Barroilhet is best remembered today for originating roles in several operas by Gaetano Donizetti and Fromental Halévy. For Donizetti he created Eustachio de Saint-Pierre in L'assedio di Calais (1836), the Lord Duke of Nottingham in Roberto Devereux (1837), Alfonso XI of Castile in La favorite (1840), and Camoëns in Dom Sebastien (1843). The Halevy roles he created include King Lusignan in La reine de Chypre (1841), the title role in the premiere of Charles VI (1843) and Mirobolante in Le lazzarone, ou Le bien vient en dormant (1844).

Other world premières in which he sang include Saverio Mercadante's La vestale (Publio) and Elena da Feltre (Guido), Il Conte di Chalais by Giuseppe Lillo, Richard en Palestine by Adolphe Adam and Marie Stuart by Louis Niedermeyer. He also sang the title-role in the pasticcio opera, Robert Bruce, in which Niedermeyer had adapted music from various operas by Rossini. He died, aged 60, in Paris.
