= Le lac des fées =

Opera by Daniel Auber

Le lac des fées (The Fairy Lake) is a grand opera in five acts composed by Daniel Auber to a French libretto by Eugène Scribe and Mélesville (the pen name of Anne-Honoré-Joseph Duveyrier). The story is set in the Harz Mountains and based on a German ballad. The opera was premiered by the Paris Opera at the Salle Le Peletier on 1 April 1839.

== Roles ==
Role	Voice type	Premiere Cast, 1 April 1839 (Conductor: )
Zéila, young fairy	soprano	Maria Delorès Nau
Albert, student	tenor	Gilbert Duprez
Marguerite, innkeeper	soprano	Rosine Stoltz
Rodolphe de Cronembourg, seigneur châtelain	bass	Nicolas Levasseur
Issachar, Jewish merchant	tenor	Pierre François Wartel
Fritz, student, companion of Albert	bass	Ferdinand Prévôt
Conrad, student, companion of Albert	tenor	Alexis Dupont
Pickler, crook	bass	Molinier
Edda, young fairy	soprano	Élian Barthélemy
A young shepherd	soprano	Élian Barthélemy
