= Charles VI (opera) =

Opera composed by Fromental Halevy

- Grand opera by Fromental Halévy
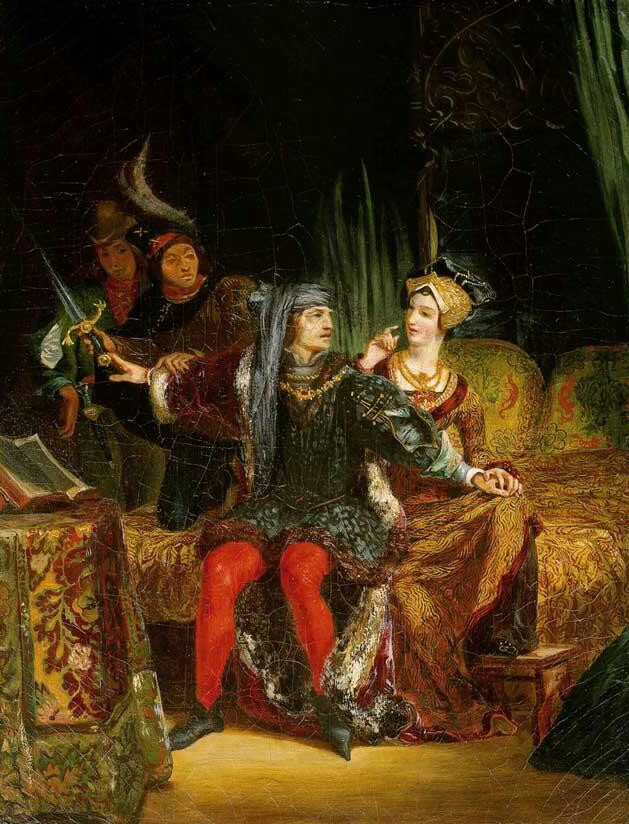
- Portrait of Charles VI and Odette
- Translation: Charles VI
- Librettist: Casimir Delavigne; Germain Delavigne
- Language: French
- Premiere: 15 March 1843; Salle Peletier, Paris

Charles VI is an 1843 French grand opera in five acts with music composed by Fromental Halevy and a libretto by Casimir Delavigne and his brother Germain Delavigne.

The number "Guerre aux tyrans!" ("War on the tyrants!") achieved separate fame as a song of political protest.

== Performance history ==
The opera was first presented on 15 March 1843 by the Paris Opera at the Salle Le Peletier. It continued to be performed there, and in a revised form beginning on 4 October 1847, up to 1848, and was revived again in 1850, receiving a total of 61 performances. Beginning on 5 April 1870 it was produced at the Théâtre Lyrique with Rosine Bloch in the role of Odette and was given there a total of 22 times.

Charles VI was also performed in French in Brussels (beginning on 2 October 1845), The Hague (25 April 1846), New Orleans (22 April 1847), Buenos Aires (4 May 1854), Batavia (27 April 1866), Barcelona (29 April 1871), Mexico (19 January 1882), and Marseille (8 April 1901). It was performed in German in Hamburg (13 February 1851) and in Italian in Milan (16 March 1876).

Performances in the 20th century were rare, but the opera was revived at Compiègne in 2005.

== Roles ==
Role	Voice type	Premiere Cast, 15 March 1843 (Conductor: - )
Le Dauphin, son of the King and heir to the French throne	tenor	Gilbert Duprez
Charles VI, King of France	baritone	Paul Barroilhet
Raymond, a farmer and former French soldier	bass	Nicolas Levasseur
Odette, daughter of Raymond	mezzo-soprano	Rosine Stoltz
Isabelle de Bavière, Queen of France	soprano	Julie Dorus-Gras
Le duc de Bedfort (Duke of Bedford), an English noble	tenor	Canaple
L'homme de la forêt du Mans	tenor	Jean-Étienne-Auguste Massol
Tanguy Duchâtel, a French commander	bass	Ferdinand Prévôt
Dunois	baritone	Octave
Lahire	baritone	Martin
Saintrailles	tenor	Saint-Denis
A student	baritone	Molinier
Gontran, a soldier	tenor	Placide Poultier
Lionel, an English officer	tenor	Raguenot
Louis d'Orléans, apparition	tenor	Brémond
Jean sans Peur, apparition	tenor	Brémond
Clisson, apparition	tenor	Brémond
Le jeune Lancastre, son of the Duke of Bedford	silent	
Chorus: French and English knights, lords and ladies of the court, French and English soldiers, pages, bourgeois, students, people

== Synopsis ==
Place: France
Time: Several years after the battle of Agincourt

The opera centres on King Charles VI of France, who amid episodes of madness, is attempting to defeat the English invaders. The final scene takes place in the Abbey of Saint-Denis. Odette, a fictional predecessor of Joan of Arc, thwarts a plot by Queen Isabelle and the English nobleman Bedfort to displace the Dauphin with Bedfort's son Lancastre, and helps restore the Dauphin to his rightful place as heir to the throne of France. The King is dying as he and the assembled French swear to the Dauphin: Guerre aux tyrans! jamais en France, Jamais l'Anglais ne régnera ("War on the tyrants! never in France, Never shall the English reign").

== Derivative works ==
- June 1, 1843, Théâtre du Gymnase, Paris — Lucrèce a Poitiers, ou Les écuries d'Augias, tragédie mêlée de vaudevilles by M. Léonard de Chatellerault;
- March 16, 1847, Teatro alla Scala, Milan — Odette ou la Démence de Charles VI, ballet by Jules Perrot.
