= Le lazzarone =

Opéra in two acts with music by Fromental Halévy

- by Fromental Halévy
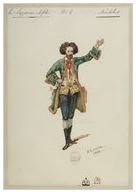
- Costume design for Mirobolante in the premiere
- Translation: The Lad from Naples
- Librettist: Jules-Henri Vernoy de Saint-Georges
- Language: French
- Premiere: 29 March 1844; Paris Opéra, Paris

Le lazzarone, ou Le bien vient en dormant (The Lad from Naples, or Good comes from Sleeping) is an opéra in two acts with music by Fromental Halévy to a libretto by Jules-Henri Vernoy de Saint-Georges. It was premiered on 29 March 1844 at the Paris Opéra.

At the instruction of Léon Pillet, the director of the Opéra, the opera was written as a vehicle for his mistress Rosine Stoltz (who had recently borne him a child). After some severe critical reactions, the opera was not successful and has not been revived.

== Performance history ==
The inappropriate casting of a far-from-splendid 31-year-old portraying a Neapolitan teenager was not appreciated by the Parisian critics. A review in the Revue et gazette musicale sardonically regretted the Opéra's 'dearth of tenors', and noted that the composer was 'forced to do without a timbre of voice so essential to an opera.' Hector Berlioz wrote that 'the orchestration is too grandiose, too pompous, too loud and even too slow for this kind of story.' At the premiere, Stoltz particularly annoyed her rival Julie Dorus-Gras by conspicuously eating macaroni onstage during the latter's aria.

The opera also marked the Paris debut of Lola Montez as an 'Andalusian dancer'. This however proved a disaster; Montez, losing a shoe during one routine, flung it into the boxes. Théophile Gautier wrote 'Mlle. Montez [...] has small feet and shapely legs. Her use of these is quite another matter'.

== Roles ==
Roles, voice types, premiere cast
Role	Voice type	Premiere cast, 29 March 1844
Mirobolante, a poetical improviser	baritone	Paul Barroilhet
Josué Corvo, a rich Neapolitan	bass	Nicolas Levasseur
Beppo	soprano	Rosine Stoltz
Baptista, a flower-seller	soprano	Julie Dorus-Gras
Chorus: Pilgrims, people of Naples, musicians.		

== Synopsis ==
Place: Naples
Time:

The lazy Beppo is enamoured of the flower seller Baptista. Mirobolante and Corvo, discovering Baptista's birth certificate, find that she is unaware that she is an heiress to a fortune. They woo her assiduously; Beppo, feeling he has no chance against such wealthy suitors, goes to sleep. Baptista however wakes him and says she much prefers him to the other two. Mirobolante and Corvo try to prevent their marriage by asserting that Baptista is a minor; her birth certificate however shows that she is 21 that very day.
