= La favorite =

1840 opera by Gaetano Donizetti

- Grand opera by Gaetano Donizetti
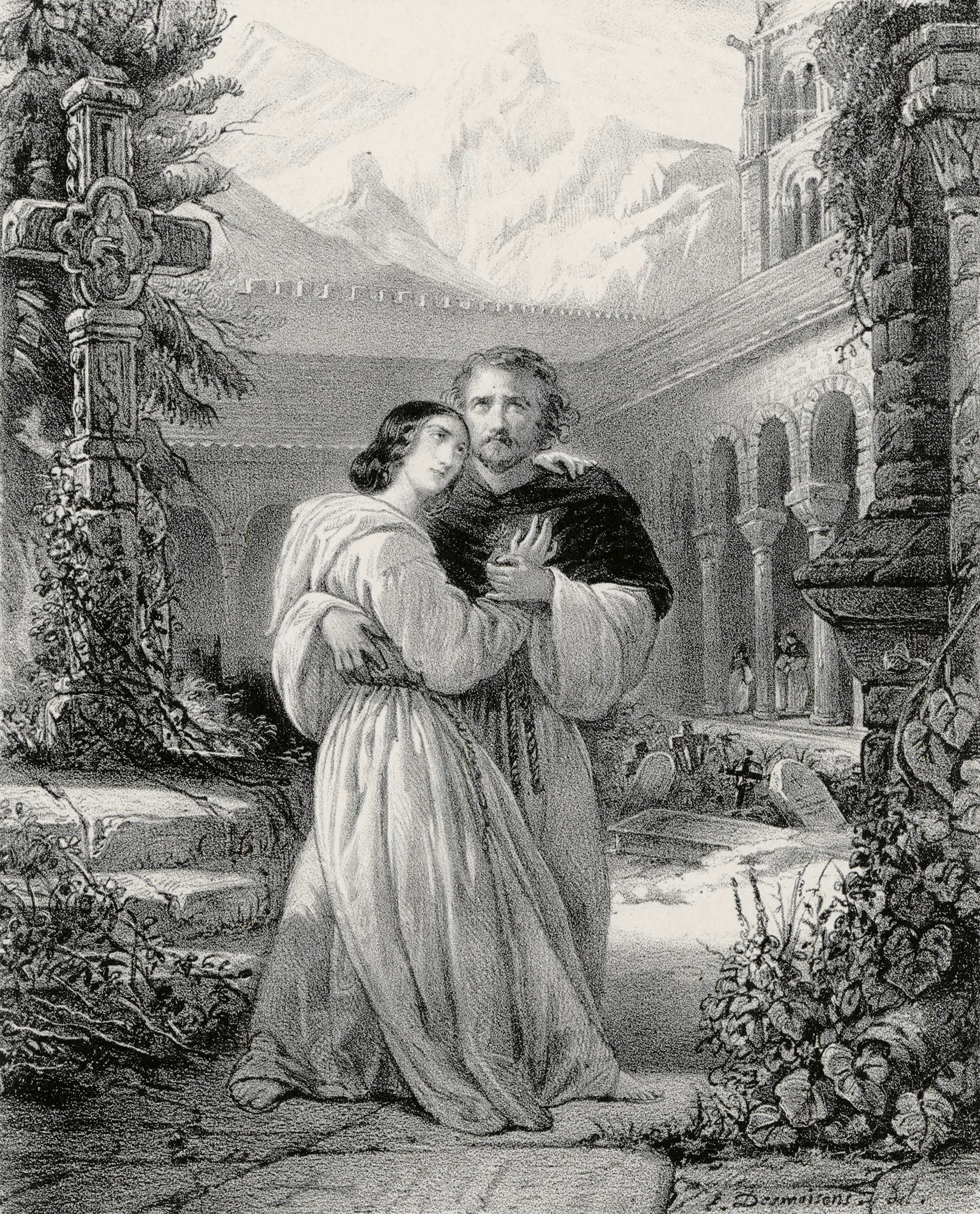
- Singers of the premiere, Rosine Stoltz and Gilbert Duprez in act 4
- Librettist: Alphonse Royer; Gustave Vaëz; Eugène Scribe
- Language: French, Italian
- Based on: Le comte de Comminges by Baculard d'Arnaud
- Premiere: 2 December 1840; Académie Royale de Musique, Paris

La favorite (The Favourite, frequently referred to by its Italian title: La favorita) is a grand opera in four acts by Gaetano Donizetti to a French-language libretto by Alphonse Royer and Gustave Vaëz, based on the play Le comte de Comminges by Baculard d'Arnaud with additions by Eugène Scribe based on the story of Leonora de Guzman. The opera concerns the romantic struggles of the King of Castile, Alfonso XI, and his mistress, the "favourite" Leonora, against the backdrop of the political wiles of receding Moorish Spain and the life of the Catholic Church. It premiered on 2 December 1840 at the Académie Royale de Musique (Salle Le Peletier) in Paris.

== Background ==
Originally, Donizetti had been composing an opera by the name of Le Duc d'Albe as his second work for the Opéra in Paris. However, the director, Léon Pillet, objected to an opera without a prominent role for his mistress, mezzo-soprano Rosine Stoltz. Donizetti therefore abandoned Le Duc d'Albe and borrowed heavily from L'Ange de Nisida, an unrealized project from 1839, to create La favorite.

Donizetti wrote the entire final act in three to four hours, with the exception of the cavatina and a part of a duet, which were added at the rehearsal stage.

== Performance history ==
The Opéra's original production (Paris, 1840) had costumes designed by Paul Lormier and sets produced by two teams of scenic artists: René-Humanité Philastre and Charles-Antoine Cambon (acts 1 and 3), Charles Séchan, Léon Feuchère, Jules Diéterle and Édouard Desplechin (acts 2 and 4). Revivals at the Palais Garnier, on 25 January 1875 and 3 February 1896, increased the scale of the staging but remained true to the original concept of 1840. The opera continued to be performed each season at the Opéra up to 1894, remaining in its repertoire until 1918, as well as maintaining a presence in the French provinces through this period.

It was revived for an Italian premiere in Padua under the title of Leonora di Guzman in 1842 with baritone Achille De Bassini in the role of Alfonso, and at La Scala as Elda in 1843 with Marietta Alboni in the title role, though Donizetti himself was not involved in these productions.

The London premiere was in English at Drury Lane in 1843 with soprano Emma Romer, and then in French two years later at Covent Garden, and in Italian at Her Majesty's in 1847. New Orleans' Théâtre d'Orléans first saw the piece on 9 February 1843 in French (followed by a performance in New York by the New Orleans French Opera Company), and the Metropolitan Opera mounted a production 1895. Italian revivals in the mid-20th century took place at La Scala Milan in 1934 with Ebe Stignani and Pertile, in Rome a year later with Cobelli and Gigli, followed by further revivals in both cities, several featuring Stignani in the title role. Arturo Toscanini conducted the work in Bergamo for the Donizetti centenary. In 1978, the Metropolitan Opera revived La Favorite (in Italian) with Luciano Pavarotti and Shirley Verrett; the opera had not been heard at the Met since Enrico Caruso sang it there in 1905, 73 years previously.

Among other performances, the Bavarian State Opera presented a new production of the work in the original French version in 2016, with Elīna Garanča, tenor Matthew Polenzani and Mariusz Kwiecień in the leading roles.

== Roles ==
Roles, voice types, premiere cast
Role	Voice type	Premiere cast, 2 December 1840 Conductor: François Habeneck
Léonor de Guzman (Leonora di Gusmann)	mezzo-soprano	Rosine Stoltz
Fernand (Fernando)	tenor	Gilbert Duprez
Alphonse XI, King of Castile	baritone	Paul Barroilhet
Balthazar (Baldassare), superior to the convent of Saint James of Compostela	bass	Nicolas Levasseur
Don Gaspar, officer of the king	tenor	François Wartel
Inès (Inez), confidante to Léonor	soprano	Elian
A lord	tenor	Molinier
Lords and ladies of the court, a maiden, pages, guards, monks of the Order of Saint James of Compostela, pilgrims

== Synopsis ==
Time: 1340
Place: Royaume de Castille

A love triangle involving the King of Castile, Alfonso XI, his mistress ('the favourite') Leonora, and her lover Fernando, the story unfolds against the background of the Moorish invasions of Spain and power struggles between church and state. (The following synopsis omits the "standard cuts".)

=== Act 1 ===
Scene 1

In the Monastery of St James, the monks are making their way to worship. Superior Balthazar (bass), father of the Queen of Castile, enters with Fernand (tenor). Balthazar knows that Fernand is preoccupied by something. Fernand confesses that he has fallen in love with a beautiful, but as yet unknown, lady. His faith in God remains, but he wishes to leave the monastery in search of her. Balthazar angrily sends Fernand out of the monastery, warning him of the dangers of the outside world. He predicts that Fernand will one day return to the cloisters, a disappointed if wiser man.

Scene 2

Fernand has found his lady, Léonor (mezzo-soprano), declared his love and received it in return, but he is still unaware of her real identity. She has arranged to meet him on the island of Leon, to which he is brought blindfolded by boat. He is met by Inès (soprano), her companion, who impresses upon him the need for secrecy. Léonor enters. She tells him that they can never marry and that they must not meet again, but nevertheless hands him a document to help him in his future. Shortly afterwards the arrival of the King is announced and Léonor leaves. Fernand is left to speculate about her elevated social position. Reading the document she has left him, he finds a commission in the army – an opportunity for advancement.

=== Act 2 ===
Alphonse (baritone) has defeated the Moors and taken Alcazar. In conversation with the courtier Don Gaspar (tenor), the King expresses his pleasure at Fernand's bravery. Alone, the King expresses his love for Léonor and his desire to divorce the Queen and marry her. He realizes that this will provoke the opposition of his powerful father-in-law Balthazar who is ultimately backed by the Pope. Léonor enters and expresses her anguish at remaining his mistress rather than his Queen. The King suspects that he is losing her affection. Don Gaspar enters with news that a letter has been discovered revealing that Léonor has a lover. She makes no denial, but at that moment Balthazar enters intent on forcing the King to abandon his plans for the royal divorce.

=== Act 3 ===
Alphonse is to honour Fernand for his role in the war. He asks Fernand what reward he would like and Fernand asks to marry the woman who has inspired him in his bravery. Alphonse asks who she is and Fernand points to Léonor. The King is astonished to learn that Fernand is his successful rival. In an abrupt change of mind, he orders Fernand and Léonor to marry within one hour. Léonor is left with mixed feelings of apprehension and delight ("O mon Fernand"). She decides that Fernand must be informed about her past and sends Inès to him. However, unknown to Léonor, Inès is arrested before she can see him. Fernand only learns the truth after the wedding ceremony. Considering himself dishonoured by the King he breaks his sword, leaves Léonor and entrusts himself to Balthazar.

=== Act 4 ===
"Angel of Light" (1919, Edison Records) sung by Albert Lindquest. English language version of the aria "Ange si pur" from act IV of La favorite.

Balthazar's daughter, the Queen, has died of jealousy and grief, and her body has been sent to him at the Monastery of St James. Prayers are being said for her repose. Fernand is preparing to enter his new religious life (aria: "Ange si pur"). Léonor enters in a state of exhaustion and faints before the cross. At first Fernand rejects her, but eventually moved by her love and sincerity, he is willing to give himself to her again, but it is too late. Léonor collapses once more and dies in his arms.

== Arrangements ==
In 1840, Richard Wagner who was undertaking transcription work in Paris at the time, made various arrangements of the work. These include piano reductions and arrangements for string quartet; about the same time, Franz Liszt wrote an arrangement of the Act 4 cavatina Spirto gentil (Ange si pur) for piano.

Antonio Pasculli composed a concerto on themes from the opera for oboe and piano/orchestra (c. 1879).

== Recordings ==
Year	Cast: Léonor, Fernand, Alphonse, Balthazar	Conductor, opera house and orchestra	Label
1912	Ketty Lapeyrette, Robert Lassalle, Henri Albers, Robert Marvini	François Ruhlmann, Orchestra and chorus of the Opéra-Comique de Paris (in French)	Audio: Pathé (21 records)
1950	Giulietta Simionato, Giuseppe Di Stefano, Enzo Mascherini, Cesare Siepi	Renato Cellini, Orchestra e Coro del Palacio de Bellas Artes di Mexico	Black Disk: Cetra LO 2-3
1955	Fedora Barbieri, Gianni Raimondi, Carlo Tagliabue, Giulio Neri	Angelo Questa, Orchestra Sinfonica e Coro della RAI di Torino	CD: Warner Fonit
1955	Giulietta Simionato, Gianni Poggi, Ettore Bastianini, Jerome Hines	Alberto Erede, Maggio Musicale Fiorentino Chorus and Orchestra	CD: Decca
1967	Fiorenza Cossotto, Alfredo Kraus, Sesto Bruscantini, Ivo Vinco	Bruno Bartoletti, Orchestra e Coro del Teatro Colón di Buenos Aires (live performance, 26 June 1967)	CD: Great Opera Performances 703
1968	Fiorenza Cossotto, Giacomo Aragall, Anselmo Colzani, Ivo Vinco	Ettore Gracis, Orchestra e Coro del Teatro Regio di Torino (live performance, 28 March 1968)	CD: Melodram MEL 27020
1971	Fiorenza Cossotto, Alfredo Kraus, Sesto Bruscantini, Ruggero Raimondi	Oliviero De Fabritiis, NHK Symphony Orchestra and Japan Chorus Union (live performance, 13 September 1971)	CD: Opera Magic's OM24165; DVD: King Records (Japan)
1973	Maria Luisa Nave, Luciano Pavarotti, Renato Bruson, Bonaldo Giaiotti	Carlo Felice Cillario, San Francisco Opera House Orchestra and Chorus (live performance, 7 September 1973)	CD: Frequenz
1974	Fiorenza Cossotto, Luciano Pavarotti, Gabriel Bacquier, Nicolai Ghiaurov	Richard Bonynge, Teatro Comunale di Bologna Chorus and Orchestra	CD: Decca
1975	Shirley Verrett, Alfredo Kraus, Pablo Elvira, James Morris	Eve Queler, New York City Opera Orchestra, Brooklyn College Chorus	CD: GALA
1976	Viorica Cortez, Alfredo Kraus, Renato Bruson, Cesare Siepi	Francesco Molinari Pradelli, Orchestra e Coro del Teatro Comunale di Genoa	CD: Dynamic CDS 480
1978	Shirley Verrett, Luciano Pavarotti, Sherrill Milnes, Bonaldo Giaiotti	Jesús López Cobos, Metropolitan Opera Orchestra and Chorus (live performance, 11 March 1978)	CD: Bensar; Cat: OL 31178
1991	Gloria Scalchi, Luca Canonici, René Massis, Giorgio Surjan	Donato Renzetti, RAI Milano	CD: Fonit
1999	Vesselina Kasarova, Ramón Vargas, Anthony Michaels-Moore, Carlo Colombara	Marcello Viotti, Munich Radio Orchestra and Bavarian Radio Choir (in French)	CD: RCA Red Seal; Cat: 74321 66229-2
2014	Kate Aldrich, Yijie Shi, Ludovic Tezier, Giovanni Furlanetto	Antonello Allemandi, Orchestra and Choir of the Théâtre du Capitole de Toulouse (in French)	DVD: Opus Arte
2017	Elīna Garanča; Matthew Polenzani; Mariusz Kwiecień; Mika Kares	Karel Mark Chichon, Bavarian State Orchestra and Choir (in French)	DVD: Deutsche Grammophon
2023	Annalisa Stroppa, Javier Camarena, Florian Sempey, Evgeny Stavinsky	Riccardo Frizza, Opera e Coro dell’Accademia Teatro alla Scala, Valentina Carrasco, Orchestra Donizetti Opera (In French, first complete recording of new critical edition)	Blu-Ray and DVD: Dynamic (Release Date: 17th Nov 2023)
