= Marie Stuart (opera) =

- Grand opera by Louis Niedermeyer
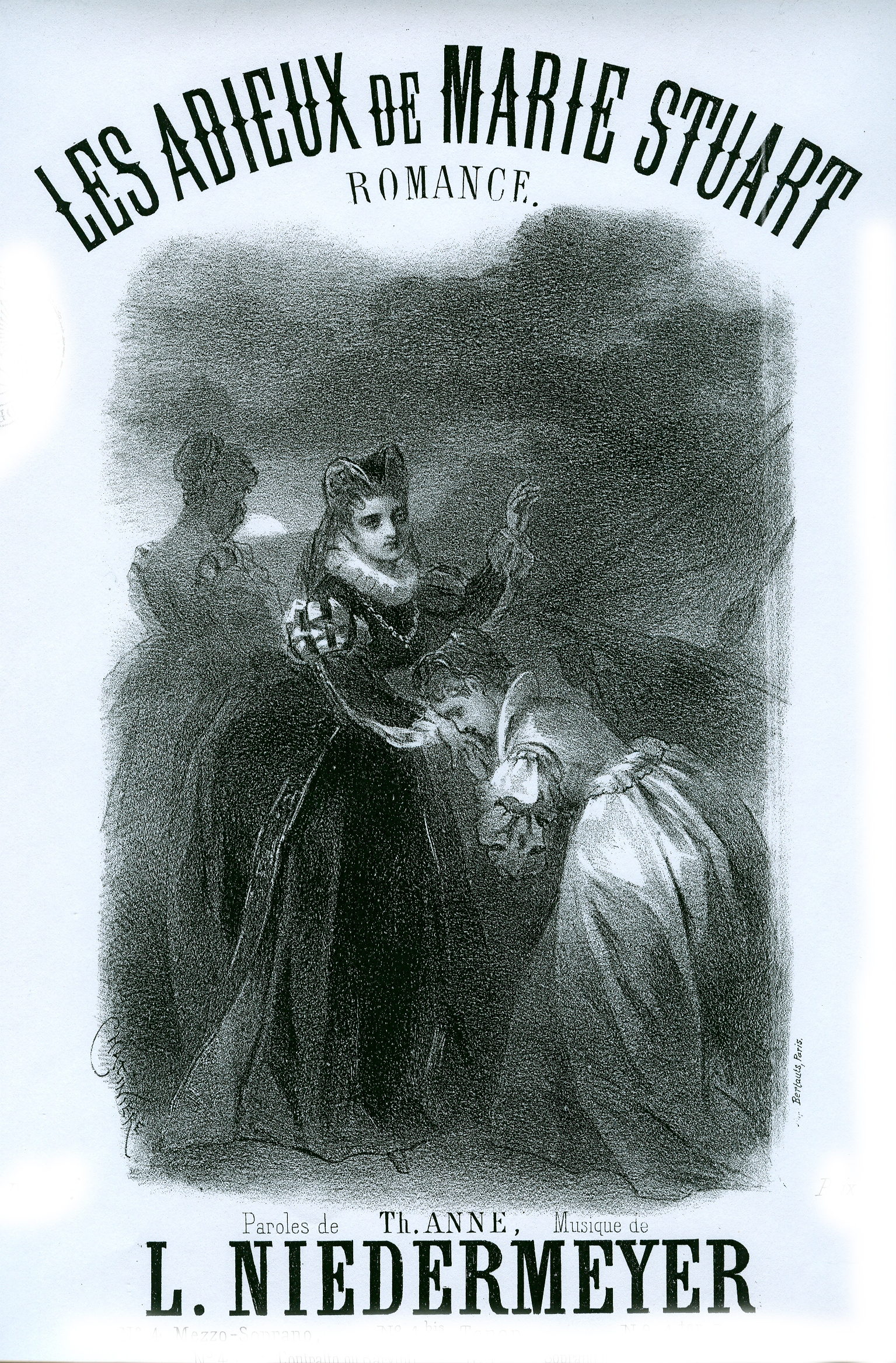
- "Les adieux de Marie Stuart", an aria from act 1
- Librettist: Théodor Anne
- Language: French
- Premiere: 6 March 1844; Théâtre de l'Académie Royale de Musique, Paris

Marie Stuart is a grand opera in five acts composed by Louis Niedermeyer to a libretto by Théodor Anne loosely based on events in the life of Mary, Queen of Scots. It premiered at the Théâtre de l'Académie Royale de Musique in Paris on 6 December 1844 with Rosine Stoltz in the title role.

== Background and performance history ==
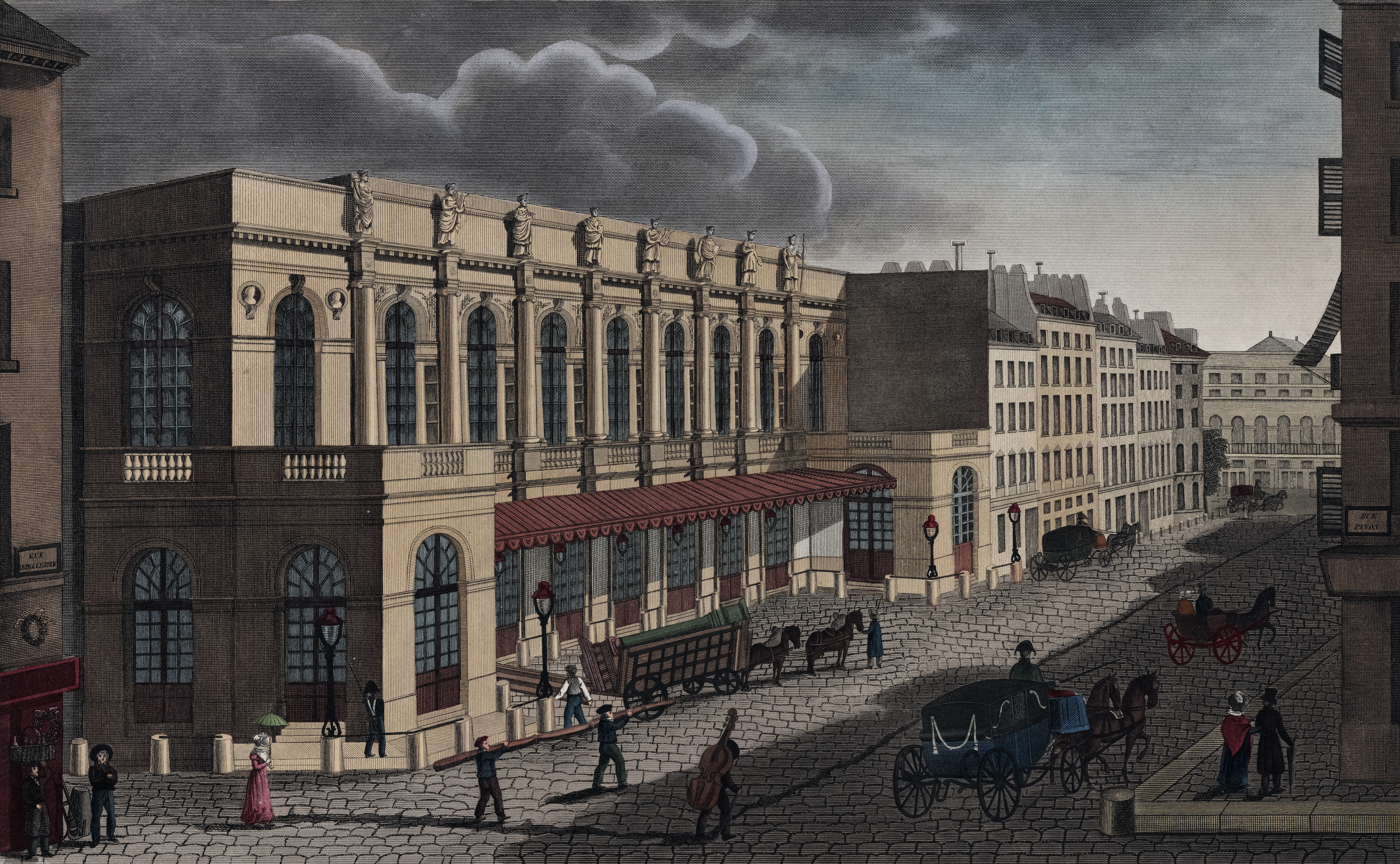
Théâtre de l'Académie Royale de Musique where Marie Stuart premiered in 1844

Marie Stuart was Niedermeyer's fourth opera and his second foray into the grand opera genre. Although some sources, e.g. Garo (2011), have written that the libretto is based on Friedrich Schiller's 1800 play, Mary Stuart, this provenance does not appear in the libretto published in 1845 or the synopsis published in 1844, and the opera is quite different from the play. Schiller's play depicts only the last two days in the life of Mary, Queen of Scots while the opera spans the period from 1561 to 1587 with the setting moving from France to Scotland and finally to England. Niedermeyer composed the score in less than a year, and the work premiered on 6 December 1844 at the Théâtre de l'Académie Royale de Musique with King Louis Philippe in attendance. The production was designed by Philastre and Cambon and directed by Jean Coralli who also choreographed the ballet divertissement for act 3. The ballet, starring Adèle Dumilâtre, was presented as a performance attended by Mary Stuart at her palace. Like many such ballets in the golden age of grand opera, it also served a dramatic function within the opera itself. Its theme, the triumph of Esther over the fallen queen Vashti, echoes Mary Stuart's hopes that she would triumph over Queen Elizabeth.

After the premiere, Niedermeyer was made a Chevalier (Knight) of the French Legion of Honour, but Marie Stuart had only a modest success. It remained in the repertoire of the Paris Opera with some cuts to the score until 1846, after which it was largely forgotten. It was, however, revived in Stuttgart in 1877 (performed in German translation), and extracts from the work were performed by Zurich Opera at the 2002 Festival della Valle d'Itria in Italy. Several pieces from the opera were published separately and were frequently performed in concerts and recitals. The most notable of these was Marie's aria in act 1 where she bids her farewell to France, "Déjà la nuit s'avance" (also known as "Les adieux de Marie Stuart"). It was performed in recitals by both male and female singers in the 19th century and continues to be performed today. It was also published in various arrangements for solo instrument including violin, piano, and flute.

== Roles ==
Roles, voice types, premiere cast
Role	Voice type	Premiere cast, 6 December 1844
Mary Stuart	mezzo-soprano	Rosine Stoltz
Earl of Bothwell, Mary Stuart's 3rd husband	tenor	Italo Gardoni
James, Earl of Moray, Mary Stuart's half-brother	baritone	Paul Barroilhet
Lord Ruthven	bass	Nicolas Levasseur
Henry Stuart, Lord Darnley, Mary Stuart's 2nd husband	bass	Armando Latour
Elizabeth, Queen of England	soprano	Julie Dorus-Gras
Cecil, Baron Burghley, Queen Elizabeth's minister	bass	Jacques-Émile Serda
David Rizzio, Mary Stuart's private secretary		Martin
George Douglas, Mary Stuart's page	soprano	Marie-Dolorès Nau (en travesti)
Sir Hamilton, governor of Lochleven Castle	baritone	Ferdinand Prévôt
Robert Melville, administrator of Mary Stuart's palace	baritone	Canaple
Lord Seyton, an ally of Mary Stuart	bass	Louis-Henri Obin
Randolph, an English officer		Molinier
Earl of Morton	bass	Brémont
Mary Fleming, Mary Stuart's lady-in-waiting		Éléonore Duclos
Anna Kennedy, Mary Stuart's companion	mezzo-soprano	Sophie Méquillet
Douglas, a Scottish lord		Octave
Huntley, a Scottish lord	bass	Joseph Menghis
Athol, a Scottish lord	bass	Jacques-Émile Serda
Gordon, a Scottish lord		Koenig
Scottish and English nobles, soldiers, people of France and Scotland

== See also ==
- Cultural depictions of Mary, Queen of Scots
- Stradella, Niedermeyer's first grand opera
