= Schloss Ketschendorf =

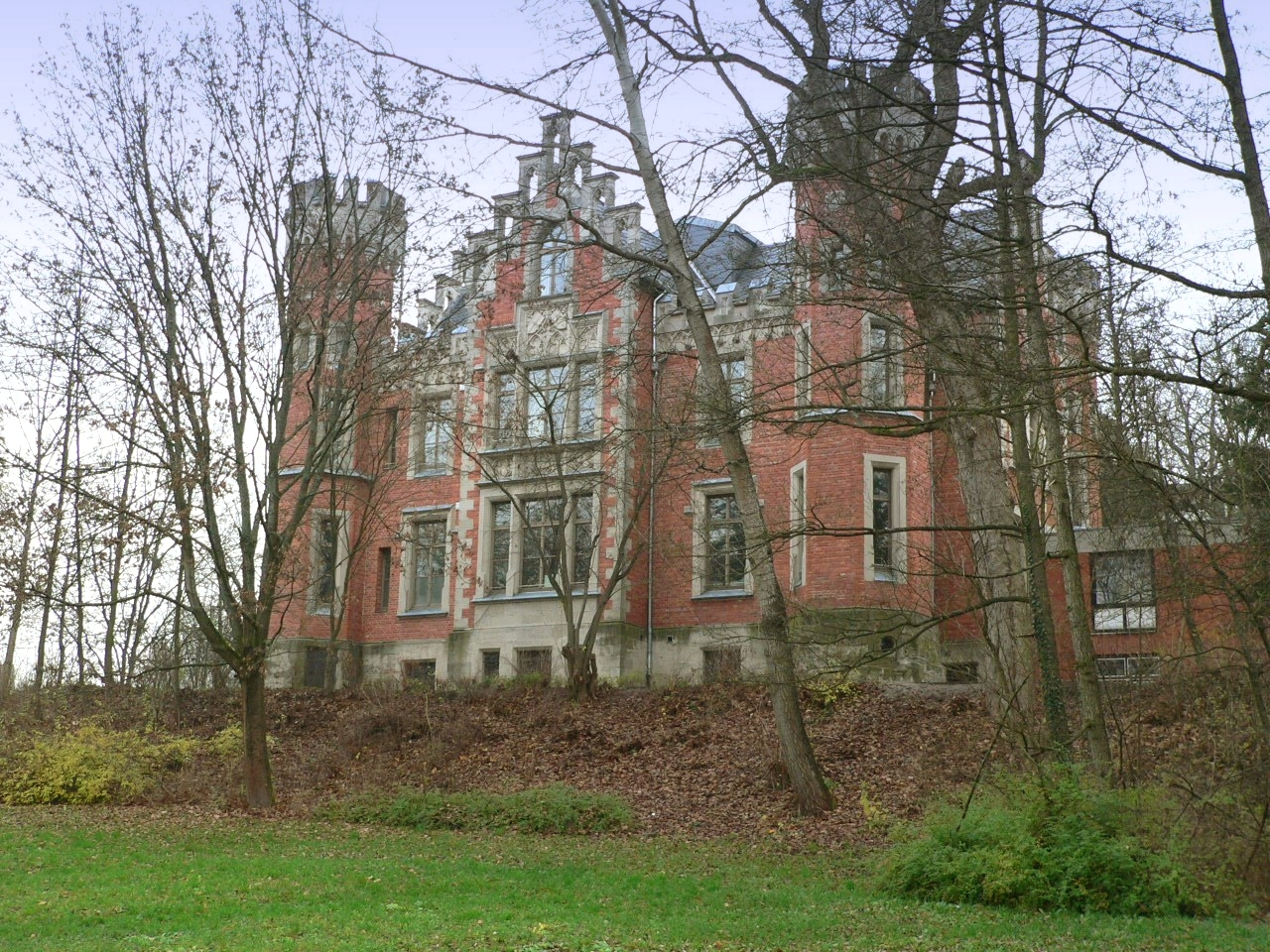
- Schloss Ketschendorf with the park

- Location within Bavaria Location within Germany

General information
- Type: Palace
- Architectural style: Gothic Revival style
- Location: Coburg, Germany
- Coordinates: 50.243056°N 10.974°E
- Construction started: 1868
- Completed: 1869

Schloss Ketschendorf is a Gothic Revival residence, located in Ketschendorf, at the foot of the Buchberg, in the town of Coburg, in the state of Bavaria, Germany.

Built at the beginning of the 19th century, the original Schloss of the Baroness von Stolzenau was surrounded by a large park. The current structure was built in 1868/9 following the demolition of the earlier one. It never served as a residence for a ruling prince or member of the nobility. After 1956 it was used as a youth hostel, which was closed on 1 December 2010. Since then the building has been vacant.

== History ==
=== Original building ===
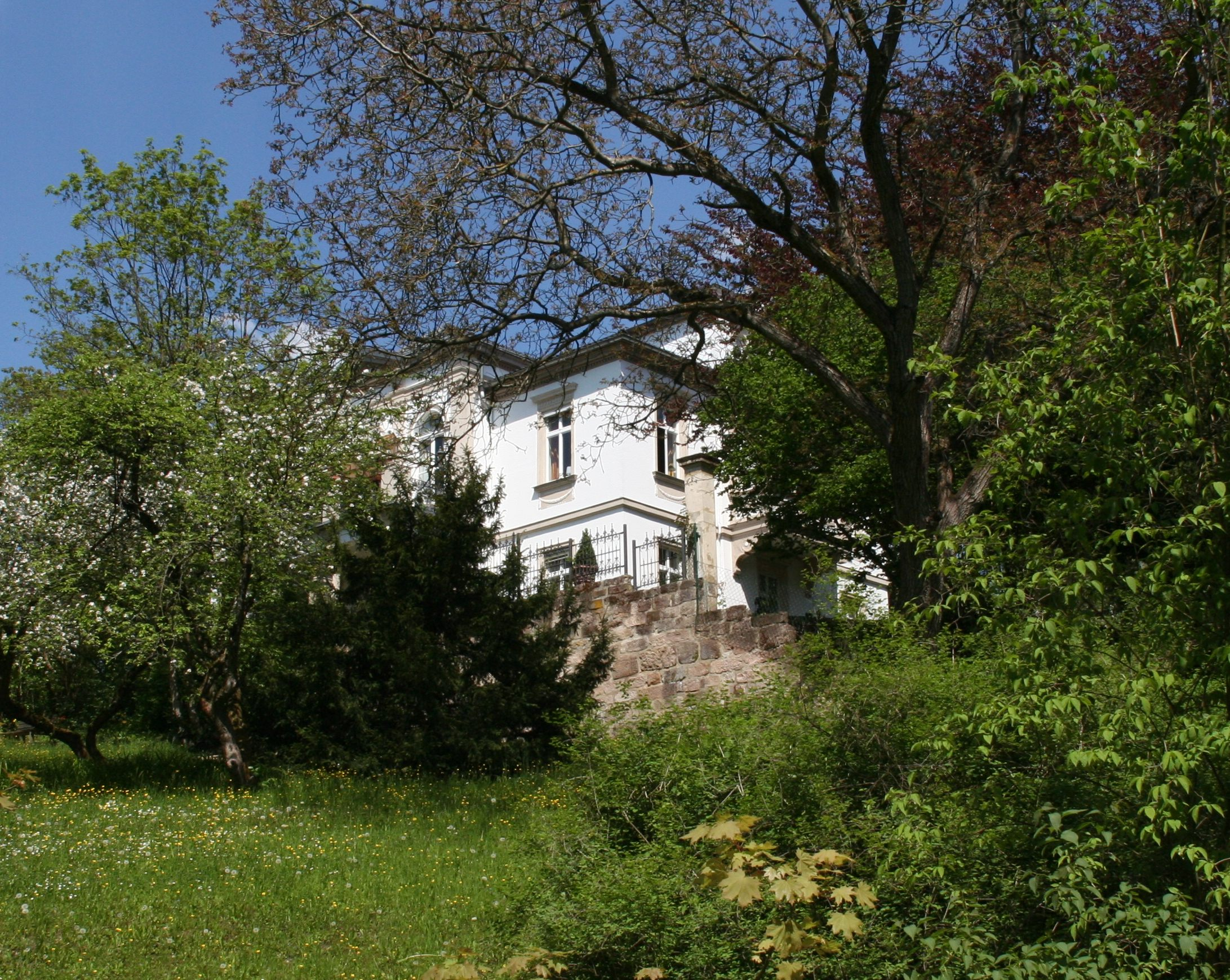
Villa at Obere Klinge 3

Keczendorff, as Ketschendorf was first known around 900 years ago, was an undefended village outside the city walls of Coburg on the western slope of the Buchberg. The few inhabitants suffered greatly under the Hussite invasions in 1430 and the German Peasants' War in 1525. Twice, in 1567 and 1626, the plague affected the village.

In 1632, during the siege of the Veste Coburg, General Wallenstein moved his personal quarters to Ketschendorf. Only two years later, during another siege in 1634/5 the Imperial Colonel Schlitz destroyed the whole village with his Croats and reconstruction started in earnest only in 1657.

In 1802, the Duchess Augusta, wife of Francis, Duke of Saxe-Coburg-Saalfeld, bought the properties on which the Schloss and the park are located today. In 1804 she had a summer palace in the Empire style built.

After the death of the duke in 1806, Schloss Ketschendorf remained the property of the widow Augusta. Besides her seven children, many princes came to visit with the duchess. They were her sons-in-law, Duke Alexander of Württemberg, Grand Duke Constantine Pavlovich of Russia and Queen Victoria’s father, Prince Edward, Duke of Kent and Strathearn. Even Frederick Louis, Hereditary Prince of Mecklenburg-Schwerin, and the parents of Constantine, Paul I and Sophie Dorothea of Württemberg, as well as his brother, Tsar Alexander I of Russia, were guests at the castle.

In 1831, after the death of Dowager Duchess Augusta, Duchess Marie of Württemberg, the second wife of Duke Ernst I, moved to Schloss Ketschendorf and lived there until she herself died in 1860. The owner of the property was then Duke Ernst II. In 1866, he sold the building to a supposedly ailing Frenchwoman named Victorine Noël.

=== Rosine Stoltz ===
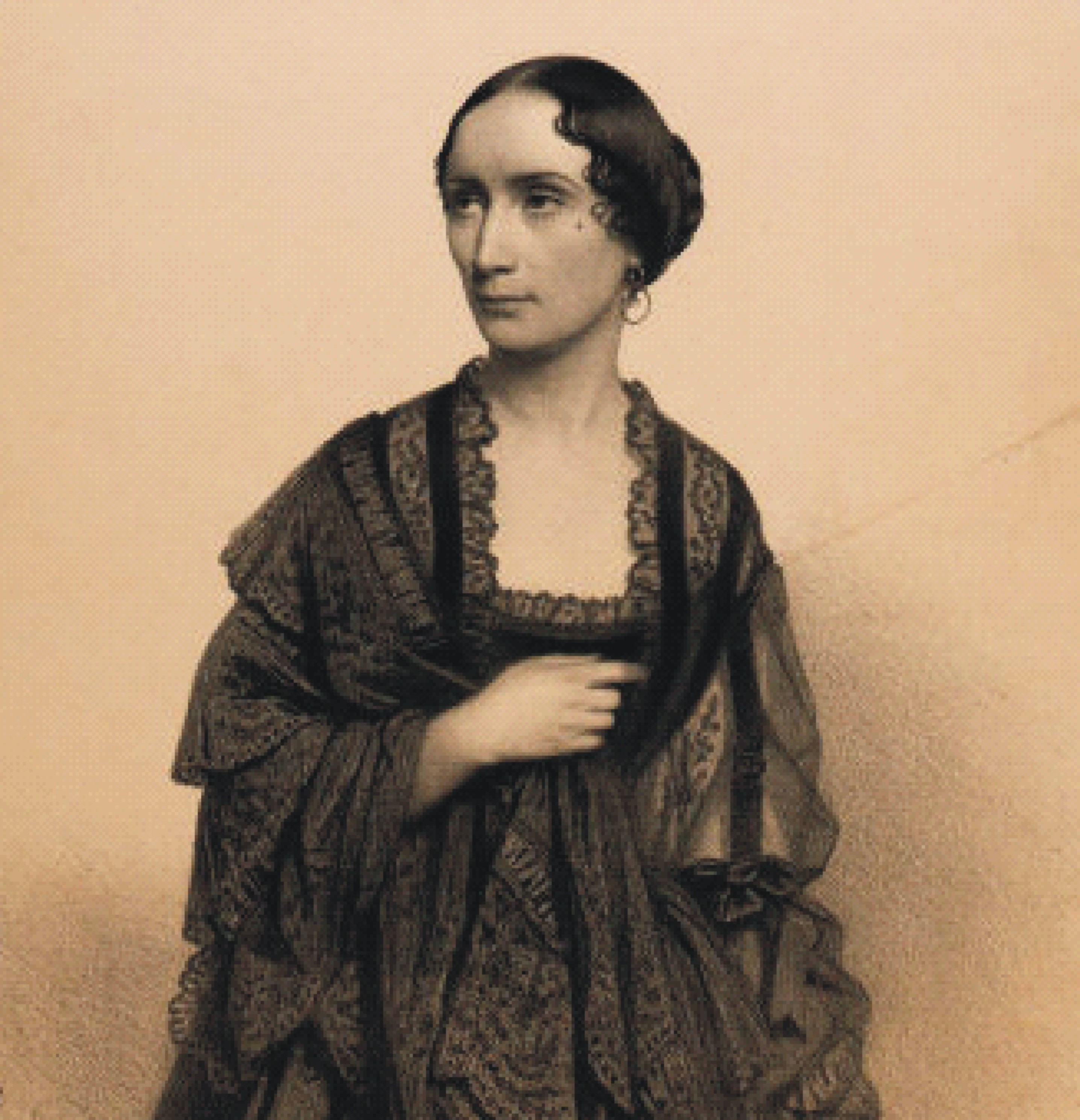
Victorine Noël/Rosine Stoltz, circa 1850

Born in Paris in 1815, Victorine Noël had already been, for the last 22 years, a celebrated opera singer with the stage name of Rosine Stoltz. She sang at the Theatre de la Monnaie in Brussels, the Paris Opera, the Teatro Municipal in Rio de Janeiro and the famous La Scala in Milan. The composers, Giacomo Meyerbeer and Gaetano Donizetti, had written roles especially for her. She enjoyed the highest recognition in the professional circles and aristocratic audiences.

The then reigning Duke of Saxe Coburg and Gotha, Ernst II, was not only a friend of artists and singers, but also composer of the opera, Santa Chiara. The main role in this romantic work was sung by Rosine Stoltz in 1856 at the Brussels Opera. They developed an intimate relationship, with Rosine Stoltz staying more often and longer as a guest of the Duke of Saxe-Coburg in Gotha without ever appearing in the court theaters of Gotha or Coburg.

Ernst II eventually raised her to the peerage in 1865. She could then be addressed as the Freifrau (Baroness) von Stolzenau and, since 1868, the Baroness von Ketschendorf. After 1865, she fulfilled only one guest commitment, at La Scala in Milan and never again appeared in the public as a singer.

Her great wealth enabled the freshly ennobled Baroness to acquire Schloss Ketschendorf with the adjoining park grounds for 100,000 francs, allegedly for her illegitimate son Charles, whose father, according to the Baroness, was none other than Napoleon Bonaparte and who could now style himself as Karl Freiherr (Baron) von Ketschendorf. His real father, Ernst II, was said to have openly boasted to have been virile (keinesfalls kinderlos, not childless) outside his own marriage.

=== Construction of the new Schloss ===
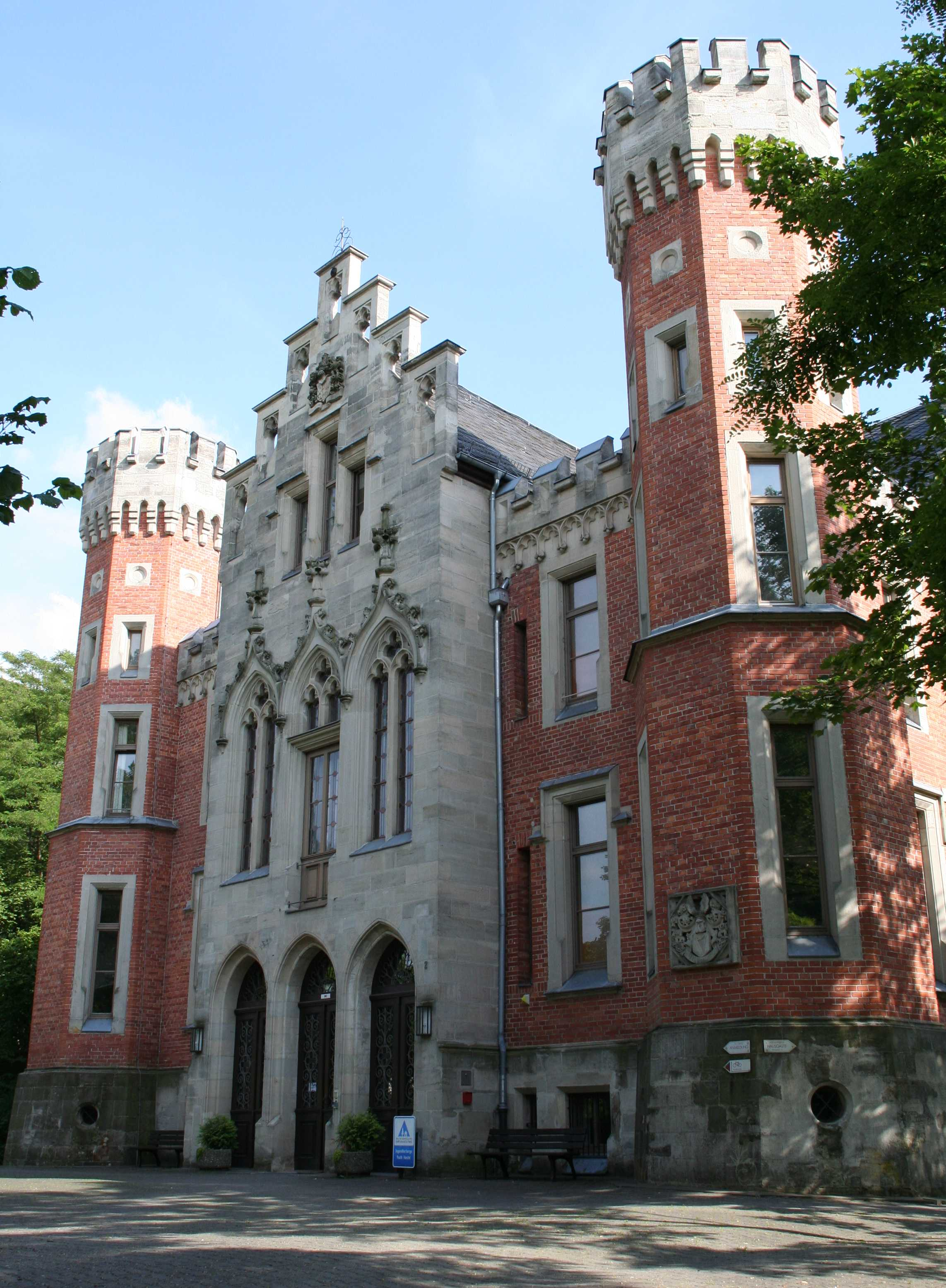
Schloss Ketschendorf

Already in 1868 the Baroness von Ketschendorf commissioned an architect from Coburg, de:Georg Konrad Rothbart who had created the de:Edinburgh-Palais in Coburg two years before, for the renovation of the ducal Empire-style manor. Rothbart, however, created a new castle, bigger and stronger, next to the original building and condemned the first building, only 63 years old, to be demolished because its "surrounding walls were, for the most part, totally rotten". Within less than a year, he achieved, with the use of 70 craftsmen, the construction.

In June 1869, the new Schloss Ketschendorf was finished and the old one was demolished. The demolition material was used to build a villa at Obere Klinge No. 4 in Coburg, which quite accurately reproduced the appearance of the old Schloss Ketschendorf in every way and by using the original porches with its classical columns from the old Schloss. This villa is therefore also called the Altes Ketschendorfer Schloss.

The new castle, with an almost square ground plan, was built from sandstone and red brick as a textbook example of Gothic Revival castle style in the Coburger Land. All four sides are flanked by octagonal crenellated towers. Each of the sides has in the centre a gable of tracery protruding from the top of the porch. The porch on the south side, designed as the entrance to the park, is particularly complicated. Above the gate, a loggia with an overlying terrace leads from the bedroom of the Baroness. The porch's columns on the north front entrance copy the central projection of the south side in a simpler way. The building owner was allowed to attach her new family crest, carved in sandstone, to the northwest corner tower. The shield of the coat of arms shows a harp and a helmet with a baron's coronet and two folded wings. The motto underneath reads Vis in Corde (Latin, "Power in the heart"). In the gable, the arms of the later owner Baron von Mayer can be seen. It is split to show a rampant lion on the left side and three ears of corn on the right side, above which is a Spangenhelm (combat helmet from the Middle Ages) whose crown sprouts a rampant lion. The motto underneath reads: Fortes Fortuna Adjuval (Latin, "Fortune favors the brave").

Inside the building the staircase was formed with decorative cast-iron railings and the view, with the tracery of the cathedral windows, is representative of the south side of the castle's centre. Stuccoed ceilings in almost every room and a finely paneled Great Music Room reflect the personal tastes of the new chatelaine. Also, a dumbwaiter was installed between the kitchen and the overlying hall.

=== Current structure ===
After the Franco-Prussian War, the French Baroness left Germany and returned to France.

She sold the whole property for only 90,000 francs and moved back to Paris to devote herself to charity. She died penniless in 1903 and was buried at the expense of the overseers of the poor in Paris in a common pauper's grave. The new owner of the castle was, for a few months, a municipal architect from Coburg, de:Julius Martinet known as an architect of the Luther and Rückert School.

In 1872, the American William Tilden acquired the property and sold it in 1873 to the Kommerzienrat Karl Rudolf Epner from Berlin. 1n 1891, Freiherr von Mayer bought the castle and park as a family residence. In 1893 a staircase was created for the castle by Johannes Koehler with a tracery balustrade as an access to the park. In 1940, it came under state administration through foreclosure because of the alleged debt of 145,000 Reichsmark in Reich Flight Taxes and the expulsion of the Jewish family Mayer. The town of Coburg bought Schloss Ketschendorf at auction, for 45,000 Reichsmark, including the park and furnishings, and set up a shelter for German repatriates from Bessarabia. From 1942 to the end of the war, the Schloss was used as a branch of the main hospital for the Coburger trade school, then until 1955 as the tuberculosis ward of the State Hospital. The family property was returned in 1954 to Egon Freiherr von Mayer by the way of Wiedergutmachung (reparation) but he did not move back to Ketschendorf.

== Park ==
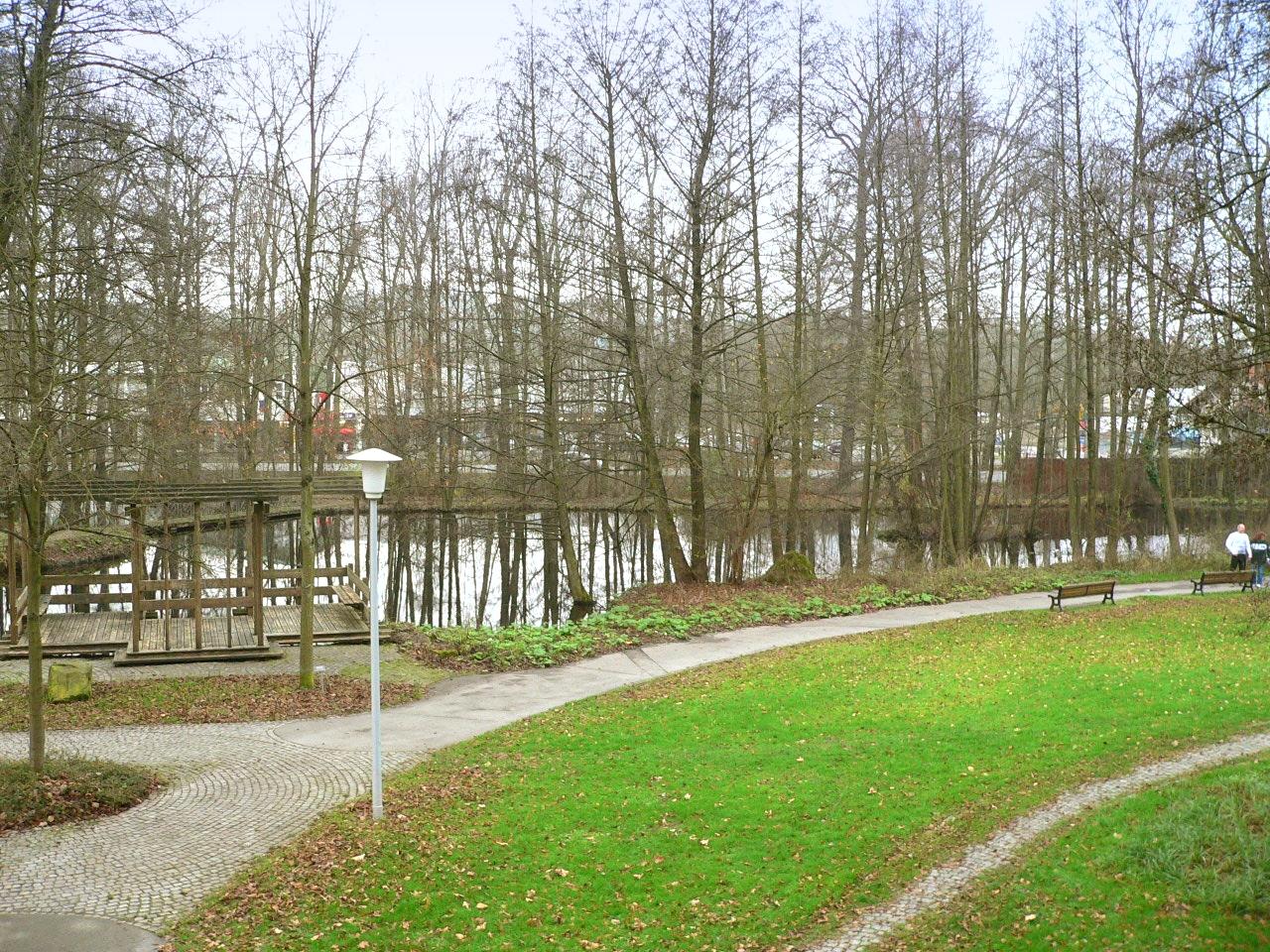
Schlossteich (pond) in the Ketschendorf Park

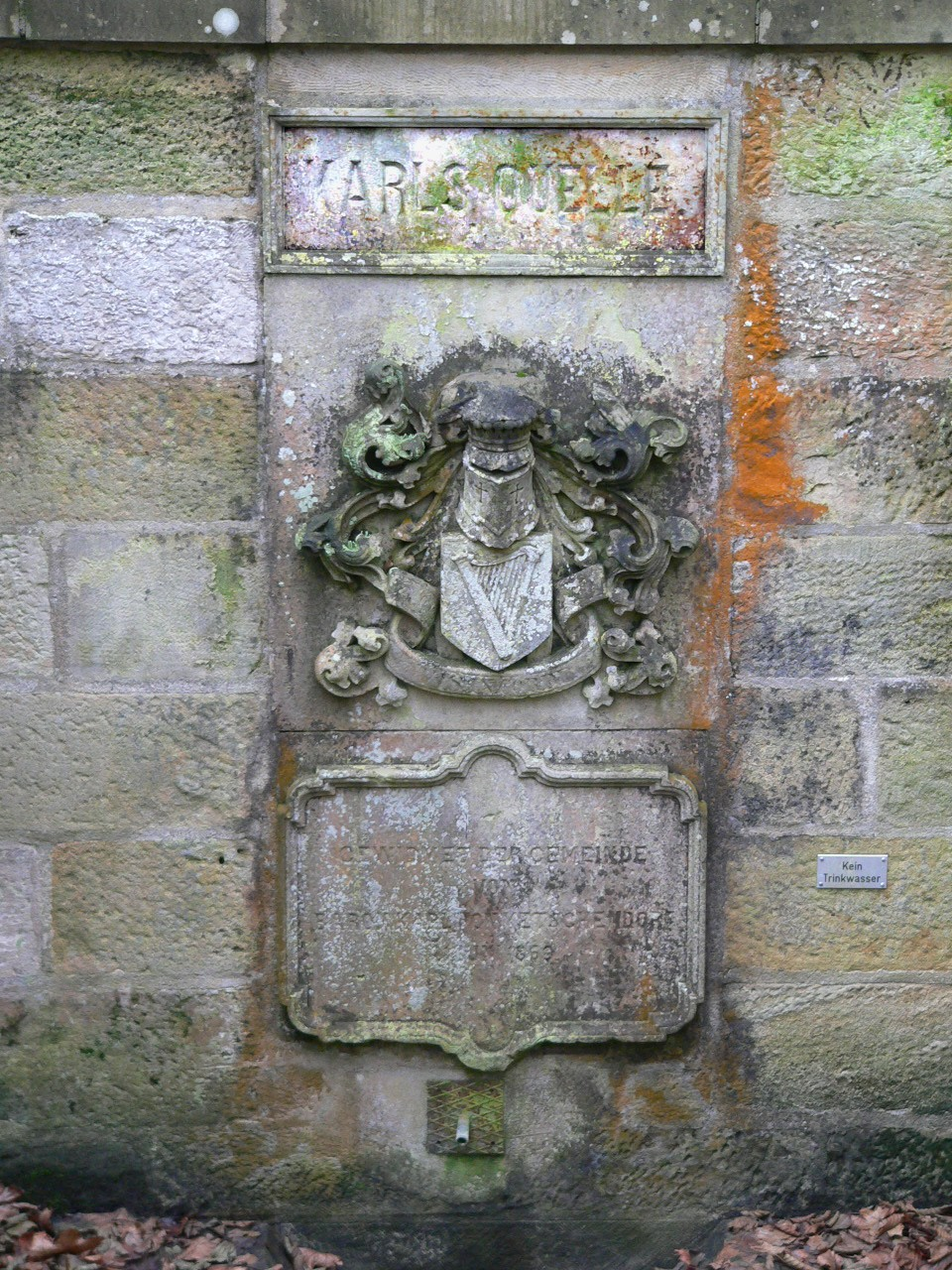
Karlsquelle in the Ketschendorf Park

The castle's park, now open to the public, was greatly expanded in 1868 at the construction of the new Schloss with some newly acquired land. In this way, the municipal well, important to the water supply of the households of Ketschendorf, was included. The old source now feeds the castle's pond, which is located in the middle of the park. As a replacement for the no longer accessible community fountain, the Baroness donated the Karlsquelle, named after her son, to the Wassergasse, next to the former forge. This bears in sandstone the Stolzenau-Ketschendorf coat-of-arms and an inscription panel. The well was moved from there after 1974, after the opening of the park to the public.

At the edge of the castle's pond stood the massive greenhouse. In the postwar years, it was abandoned to disrepair. It was eventually sold in 1959 to the Sportverein Ketschendorf, which converted it to a training hall for weightlifting and a clubhouse and in 1995 added to the club a large open terrace at the pond.

== Post-War use ==
Mayer sold the property in 1955 to the town of Coburg which in 1956 began to operate the Schloss as a youth hostel in the DJH-Landesverband Bayern e. V. (Bavarian State Association of the German Youth Hostel Association). On 1 January 1990, the responsibility for the architectural preservation, construction and renovation of the castle, which began in 1979, was passed to the DJH-Landesverband but a part of the historic park, equipped with areas for games, sports, meadows and ponds, remained with the town.

The historic equipment in the entrance's stairwell (stucco lustro) and in the Music Room (wall panels) still exist in some parts but the representative rooms of the main floor (piano nobile) still have the color combined stucco and painted ceilings as well as overdoors. In 1960, the balconies and pillars were demolished at the entrance of the north front due to disrepair. In 1979 and 1980, the present monument was built east of here. In addition, two new guest floors with 88 beds were made for the guest quarters, a manager's apartment and a technical centre. Later, because of increased demand, the complex was expanded to about 130 available beds for the visitors.

The Altes Ketschendorfer Schloss, the villa in the Oberen Klinge, received two awards in 2005 for its exemplary and detailed efforts of preservation during its expansion.

The former greenhouse, converted to a gymnasium, was purchased in 1996 by the town. Around 2002, the Seemanns-Chor of Coburg acquired the offices of the building. The Radwanderweg (cycling path) Coburg-Bamberg now passes through the park.

Schloss Ketschendorf has been vacant since the hostel closed in December 2010.

The 2013 film Ruby Red and its 2014 sequel Sapphire Blue used the Schloss as a location.

== Bibliography ==
- (de) Fritz Mahnke, Schlösser und Burgen im Umkreis der Fränkischen Krone (Coburg: Druck- und Verlagsanstalt Neue Presse GmbH, 1974), pp. 25–30
- (de) Otto Friedrich, Hundert Jahre Schloß Ketschendorf(1970) and 900 Jahre Ketschendorf (1975)
- (fr) Arthur Pougin, “La Stoltz”, L'intermédiaire des chercheurs curieux, No. 1208, Vol. LIX (1909)
- (de) Renate Reuther, Villen in Coburg (Coburg: Veste Verlag Roßteuscher, 2011), pp. 97–106. ISBN 978-3-925431-31-9
