= Molinier (baritone) =

French operatic baritone

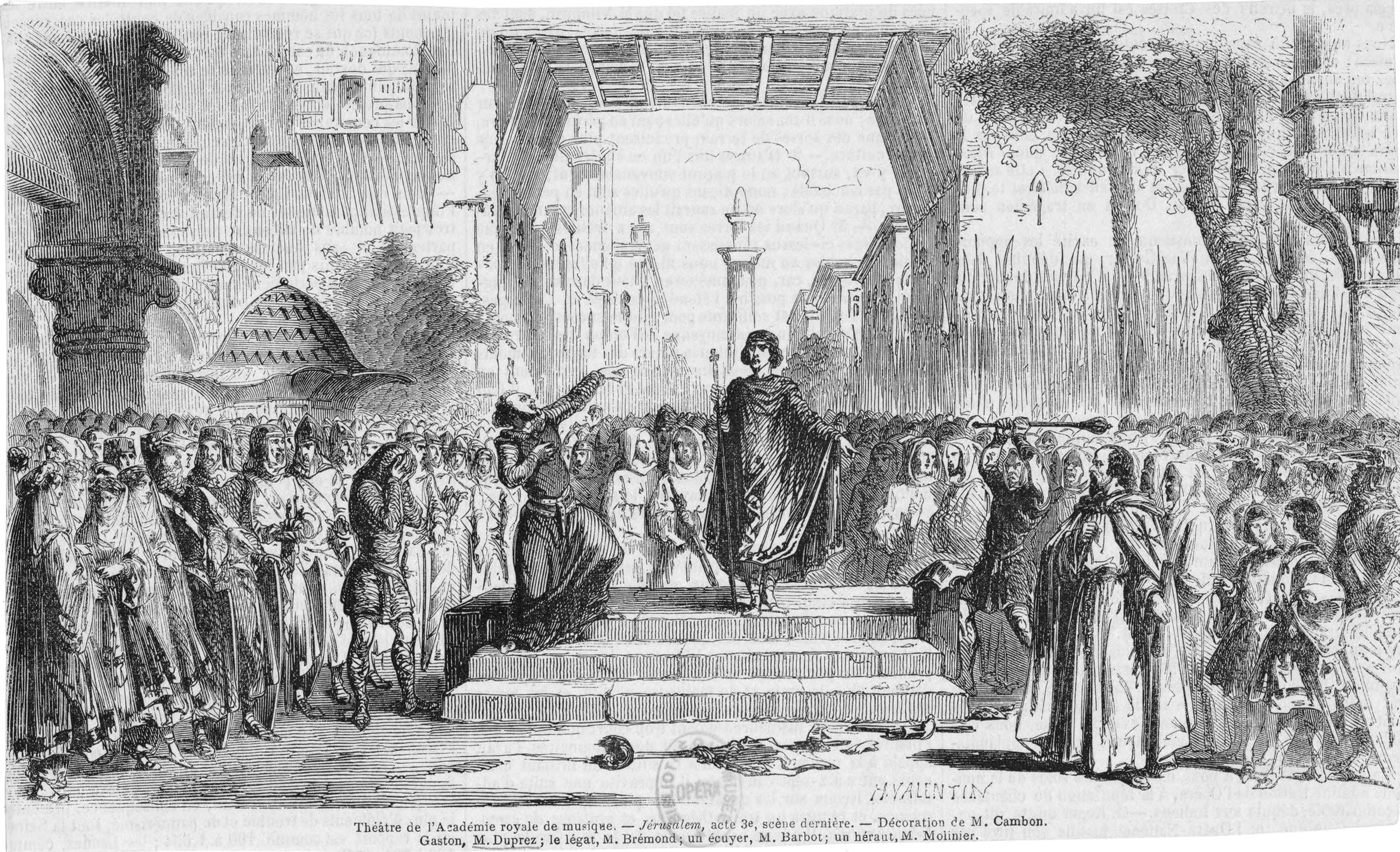
Press illustration of Act 3, scene 2, of Verdi's Jérusalem (1847) showing Molinier as a herald (presumably in front, just to the right of the platform, holding a scroll)

Molinier was the stage name of François Gély (1807–1859), a French operatic baritone who mostly performed minor roles at the Paris Opéra.

He made his professional debut without much success on 15 February 1826 with the Opéra-Comique at the Salle Feydeau as Alibour in Méhul's Euphrosine et Coradin.

He first appeared at the Paris Opéra on 2 October 1837 as an emergency replacement in a leading bass role, Pietro in Daniel Auber's La muette de Portici. He sang with great emotion, but was thought to have overextended his resources. However, having rescued the performance (and the receipts), he was rewarded by engagement as a company regular, and continued to sing there until 1854. During this period he created a number of minor roles, as noted in the list below. He also performed other minor roles, such as a herald-in-arms in Meyerbeer's Robert le diable, the Comte de Nevers in Meyerbeer's Les Huguenots, Rodolphe and Melcthal in Rossini's Guillaume Tell, and Pharaon in Rossini's Moïse.

== Roles created ==
- 1838: Lorenzo in Guido et Ginevra by Halévy
- 1838: Pompeo in Benvenuto Cellini by Berlioz
- 1839: Pikler in Le lac des fées by Auber
- 1840: A Christian in Les martyrs by Donizetti
- 1840: A lord in La favorite by Donizetti
- 1843: A student in Charles VI by Halévy
- 1844: Randolph in Marie Stuart by Louis Niedermeyer
- 1847: A herald in Jérusalem by Giuseppe Verdi
- 1849: The herald in Le prophète by Meyerbeer
- 1852: A lord in Le Juif errant by Halévy
