= La reine de Chypre =

Grand opera in five acts composed by Fromental Halévy

- Grand opera by Fromental Halévy
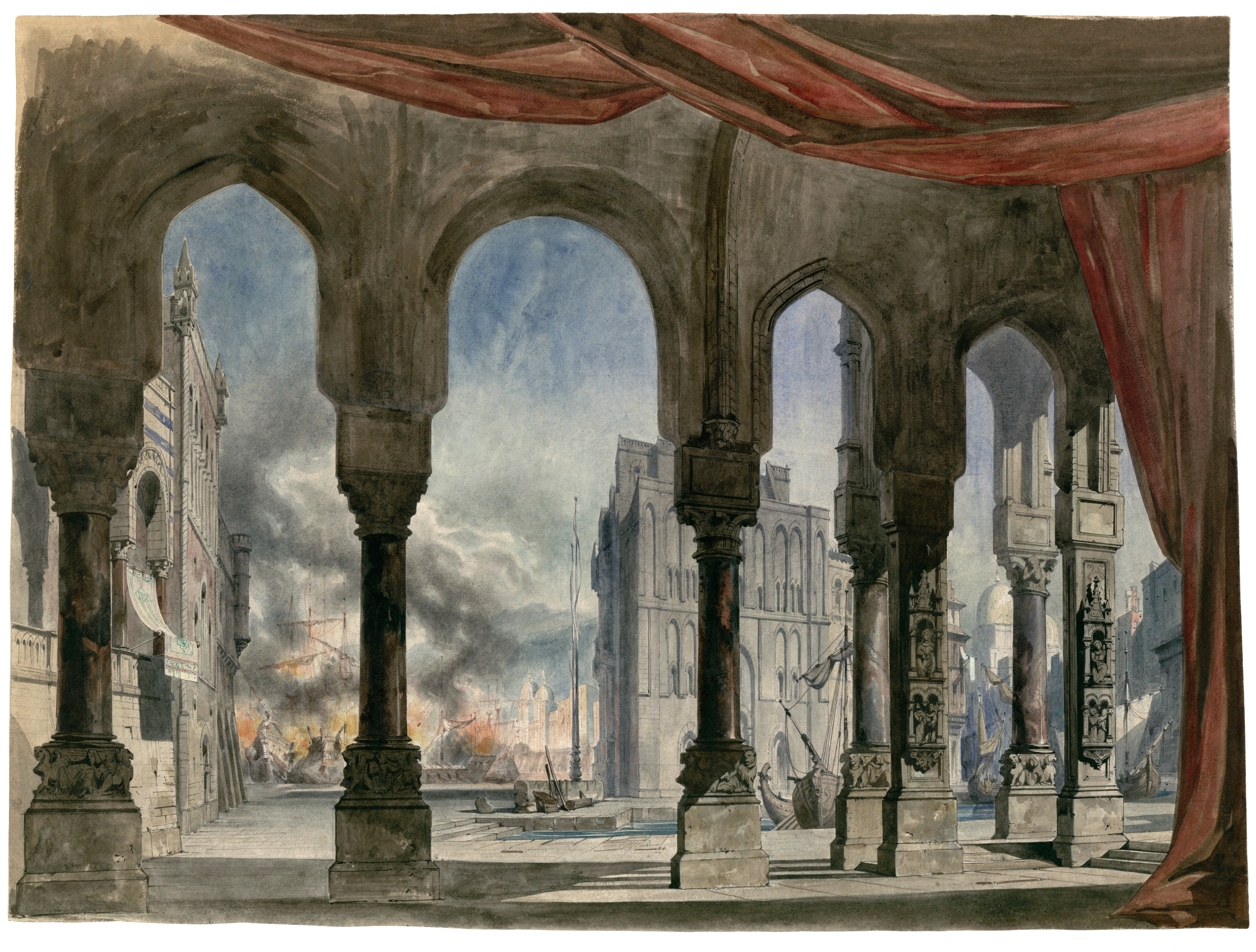
- Set design for Act V, Tableau 2, by Charles-Antoine Cambon.
- Translation: The Queen of Cypres
- Librettist: Jules-Henri Vernoy de Saint-Georges
- Language: French
- Premiere: 22 December 1841; Salle Le Peletier, Paris

La reine de Chypre (French pronunciation: [la ʁɛn də ʃipʁ], The Queen of Cyprus) is an 1841 grand opera in five acts composed by Fromental Halévy to a libretto by Jules-Henri Vernoy de Saint-Georges.

== Performance history ==
La reine de Chypre, first performed at the Salle Le Peletier of the Paris Opéra on 22 December 1841 with Rosine Stoltz in the title role and Gilbert Duprez as Gérard, was regarded in its time as one of the composer's greatest achievements. Joseph Mazilier was the choreographer, and the ballet starred Adéle Dumilâtre, Natalie Fitzjames, and Pauline Leroux with Marius Petipa and Auguste Mabile. The publisher Maurice Schlesinger was reputed to have paid the enormous sum of 30,000 francs for the rights to the opera.

The opera prompted an extended eulogy from Richard Wagner, who was present at the first night, in the Dresden Abend-Zeitung, for which he was a correspondent. However, since the 19th century it has been rarely revived.

The libretto, or a version of it, was used by several other composers within a three-year period: Franz Lachner (1841), Michael Balfe (1844), and Gaetano Donizetti (1843), whose Caterina Cornaro is based on an Italian translation. The historical background was well summarised by Wagner in his review:

[...] In the latter half of the fifteenth century, with predatory designs on the isle of Cyprus, - then ruled by the French house of Lusignan - Venice hypocritically took the part of a prince of that house, whose right to the throne was disputed by his family, [...], helped him to his crown, and sought to saddle him with its baleful influence by giving him for his wife Catarina, daughter of the Venetian senator Andreas Cornaro. This King died soon thereafter, and, as is generally supposed, by Venetian poison [...] Conspiracies came to a head to rob the royal widow of the regency over her son; Catarina's obstinate refusal to give up the reins of government, together with her spirited resistance, this time frustrated Venice's plan.

Now, adds Wagner, 'let us see how Herr Saint-Georges has used this historical find for a five-act lyric drama'.

== Roles ==
Role	Voice type	Premiere Cast, 22 December 1841 (Conductor: François Habeneck)
Andrea Cornaro, Venetian nobleman	bass	Lucien Bouché
Gérard de Coucy, French chevalier	tenor	Gilbert Duprez
Jacques de Lusignan, King of Cyprus	baritone	Paul Barroilhet
Catarina Cornaro, niece of Andrea, betrothed to the King	contralto	Rosine Stoltz
Mocénigo, senator, member of the Council of Ten	baritone	Jean-Étienne-Auguste Massol
Strozzi, chief rogue	tenor	François Wartel
Herald of arms	bass-baritone	Ferdinand Prévôt
Chorus: Venetian lords and ladies, Cypriot lords and ladies, Bishop of Cyprus, clergy, guards, courtiers of the King of Cyprus, Cypriot people, courtesans, rogues
Costume designs for Stoltz and Duprez in Acts IV and V		Barroilhet in Act III

== Synopsis ==
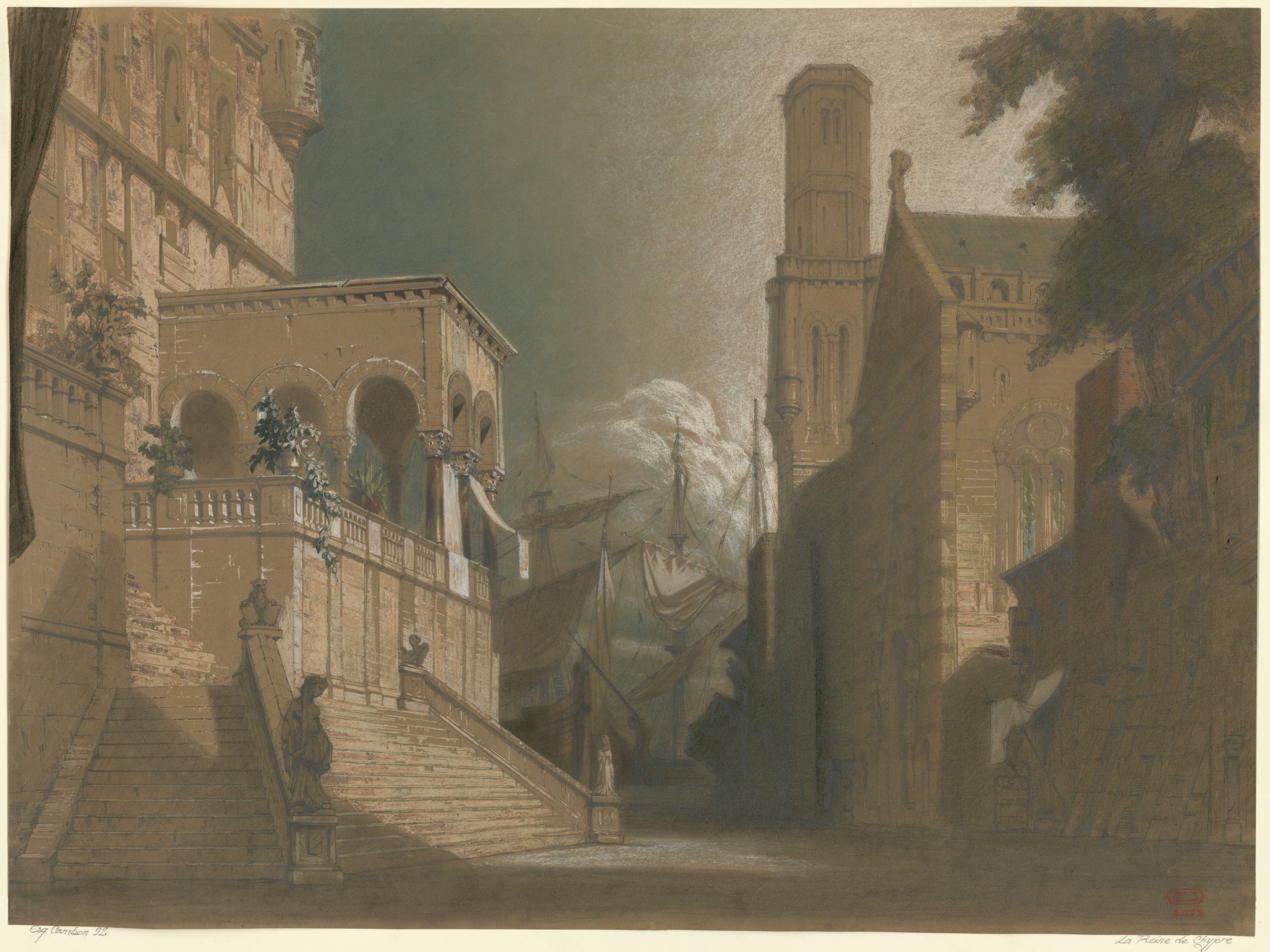
Set design for Act IV by Charles-Antoine Cambon

Time: 1441
Place: Venice (Acts 1–2); Cyprus (Acts 3-5)

=== Act 1 ===
In the Cornaro palace in Venice, Andrea is about to marry his niece Catarina to Gérard. Mocenigo however announces the decision of the Council of Ten to marry her to the King of Cyprus; otherwise Andrea faces execution. He is given one hour to make up his mind. Andrea revokes his promise to Gérard, to the scandal of all present.

=== Act 2 ===
Catarina's chamber in the Cornaro palace. Andrea asks Catarina to forgive him. No sooner has he left than, by a secret passage, Mocenigo appears, with a bunch of assassins, and insists that Catarina tell Gérard when she sees him that she no longer loves him otherwise Mocenigo's companions will do away with him. They retreat to the passage while Gérard enters and, to his bewilderment, hears his dismissal from his lover. When he has left Mocenigo remerges and seizes Catarina to take her to Cyprus.

=== Act 3 ===
A feast, in Cyprus, awaiting the arrival of Catarina. Mocenigo is informed that Gérard may be lurking in the vicinity. He sets his swordsmen on Gérard, who is saved by the intervention of a stranger (in fact the King of Cyprus in disguise). Each tells the other his story - as is the custom in such melodramas, without actually giving away their true identities - and they promise eternal brotherhood. The guns sound for Catarina's arrival.

=== Act 4 ===
At Catarina's marriage festivities, Gérard seeks to revenge himself by slaying her husband, but recognises him at the last moment as his deliverer. The King is equally astonished but prevents Gérard from being slaughtered by the crowd and delivers him to prison.

=== Act 5 ===
Two years later. The King is dying, and reveals that he knows of her love for Gérard (whom he has spared from execution). He hopes she may be happy with him. Enter Gérard, as a Knight of Malta - he announces that the King is fact dying of Venetian poison and hopes that he can still be saved. Enter Mocenigo to tell them it is too late to save the King, and that Catarina must hand power over to him. Catarina and Gérard however successfully resist the Venetian invasion. Mocenigo is captured. The King with his last breath hands his crown to Catarina, to whom the people swear fealty. Gérard renounces his love.

== Critical comments ==
Wagner praised the libretto of Saint-Georges for its competence, even allowing for its lack of poetry. The music he called 'noble, feeling and even new and elevating', although he was critical of Halévy's lapses towards unsophisticated orchestration. Although he felt the opera did not reach the level of the composer's La Juive, he wrote 'the Opéra may congratulate itself on the birth of this work, for it is decidedly the best that has appeared on its boards since Meyerbeer's Les Huguenots '. (This tribute to Meyerbeer was deleted when Wagner later reprinted the review, in line with his later vendetta against the composer).

However, George Sand, who was also at the premiere, wrote to Eugène Delacroix:

"You did well, old friend, not to go to the Opera. It was boring to death in spite of the magnificence and pomp of the spectacle. I trust your truffles gave you more inspiration than La Reine de Chypre gave to M. Halévy.

== Recording ==
With Véronique Gens (Catarina Cornaro), Cyrille Dubois (Gérard de Coucy), Éric Huchet (Mocénigo), Étienne Dupuis (Jacques de Lusignan), Christophoros Stamboglis (Andrea Cornaro), Artavazd Sargsyan (Strozzi). Hervé Niquet conducts the Flemish Radio Choir and the Orchestre de chambre de Paris Release Date: 2018 CD Ediciones Singulares Cat: ES1032
