= Rosine Stoltz =

French operatic mezzo-soprano

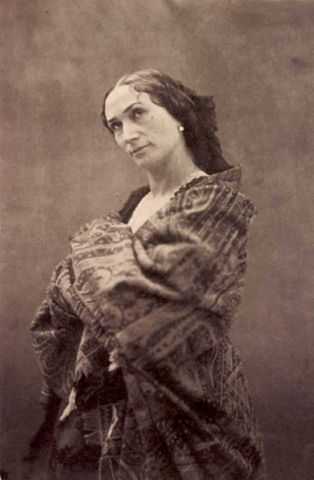
- Photo by Nadar
- Born: Victoire or Victorine Noël; 13 January 1815; Paris
- Died: 30 July 1903 (aged 88); Paris

Rosine Stoltz (born Victoire or Victorine Noël) (13 January 1815 – 30 July 1903) was a French mezzo-soprano. A prominent member of the Paris Opéra, she created many leading roles there including Ascanio in Berlioz's Benvenuto Cellini, Marguerite in Auber's Le lac des fées, the title role in Marie Stuart, and two Donizetti heroines, Léonor in La favorite and Zayda in Dom Sébastien.

== Early life and training ==
Stoltz was born Victoire Noël on the boulevard du Montparnasse in Paris, the daughter of the concierges Florentin Noël and Clara Stoll. She received her first vocal training as a pensionnaire at the École Royale de Chant et Déclamation directed by Alexandre-Étienne Choron.

== Early career ==
Just short of her sixteenth birthday she left Choron's school to travel in the Low Countries under the name of Mlle Ternaux. Her principal biographer Gustave Bord speculates that she had run away from the school with the son of the famous merchant of shawls on the Place des Victoires, Monsieur Ternaux. In Brussels, after having performed in the chorus of the Théâtre de la Monnaie, she made a tentative and unsuccessful attempt at performing in vaudeville. In 1831 she was engaged as second female vocalist with the opera in Spa, before appearing in Antwerp and Amsterdam under the name Mlle Héloïse.

For the 1832–1833 season, she appeared in secondary roles at the Monnaie under the name of Mlle Ternaux, and in 1833–1834 was heard in Lille in Rossini's operas Il barbiere di Siviglia, Tancredi, and Otello, performing in Italian. It was during this period that she began her rivalry with the soprano Julie Dorus-Gras, who had come to Lille to sing Alice in Meyerbeer's Robert le diable. After Dorus-Gras' departure, Stoltz wanted to sing Alice, but the management offered it instead to the house soprano, Mme Léon. However, by the end of 1834 Stoltz appeared as Alice at the theatre in Antwerp, and also sang there as Gertrude in Paer's Le maître de chapelle.

In 1835 Stoltz was again engaged at the Monnaie to sing secondary roles, and leading roles when needed, and opened the 1835–1836 season on 5 May 1835, under the name Mme Stoltz (inspired by her mother's maiden name), in the role of Alice in Robert le diable. On 23 December she sang Rachel in the Brussels's premiere of Halévy's La Juive, the success of which equaled that of Robert le diable in the same house on 10 October 1833. She also appeared as Petit-Jacques in Rossini's La pie voleuse (The Thieving Magpie) on 14 May 1835 and as Marguerite in Hérold's Le pré aux clercs on 15 May.

In the 1836–1837 season she came to the attention of the leading tenor from the Paris Opera, Adolphe Nourrit, who returned to the Monnaie in June to appear in Robert le diable, followed by Auber's Gustave III and La muette, Rossini's Guillaume Tell, Boieldieu's La dame blanche, Halévy's La Juive, and Gaveaux's Le bouffe et le tailleur (in which Nourrit sang the role of Cavatini and Stoltz, Célestine). Impressed by her talent, Nourrit encouraged her and promised to arrange for her debut at the Paris Opera. This was delayed, however, since Stoltz disappeared so abruptly and completely, that many believed she might have died. It was later learned that on 2 March 1837 she had married Alphonse Lescuyer, director of the Monnaie, having given birth to his son, also named Alphonse, on 21 September 1836 in Brussels.

== Paris Opera ==
Stoltz finally made her debut at the Paris Opera on 25 August 1837 in La Juive, partnered not by Nourrit, with whom she would never again appear, but with his rival Gilbert Duprez. Despite her stage fright, which she was unable to control, she was well received. After a subsequent performance, it was recognized that she possessed a pure voice with a fine timbre and a remarkable range. She was praised for the beauty of her tones in the contralto range and compared to one of the Opera's leading sopranos, Cornélie Falcon. On 6 September Stoltz appeared as Valentine in Meyerbeer's Les Huguenots, the other role for which Falcon was most renowned. Falcon was suffering recurrent vocal difficulties after losing her voice during a performance of Niedermeyer's Stradella in March 1837, and she withdrew from further performances at the Opera for an extended period after an appearance as Valentine on 15 January 1838. Stoltz's first creation at the Opera was Ricciarda in Halévy's Guido et Ginevra on 5 March 1838.

Eventually Stoltz's place of prominence at the Paris Opera was influenced by her relationship with the director, Léon Pillet. Pillet refused to mount an opera without a role for his mistress; this was one reason for the long-delayed première of Meyerbeer's opera Le prophète, as the composer, who could not abide Stoltz, insisted on Pauline Viardot for the role of Fidès. In view of the circumstances, Donizetti decided to abandon his original project for the Opéra, Le duc d'Albe, and instead composed La favorite with the role of Léonor perfectly suited for Stoltz.

== Later career and life ==
Stoltz resigned from the Opera in 1847 in a scandal over her relationship with Pillet. She may have had a child with Pillet, as they traveled Le Havre for a time due to her "indisposition". She later married Manuel de Godoy di Bassano, 3rd Prince de Godoy di Bassano, and was the longtime mistress of Ernest II, Duke of Saxe-Coburg and Gotha, who offered her the Castle of Ketschendorf.

Stoltz died in Paris, the city of her birth, aged 88.

== List of roles created at the Paris Opera ==
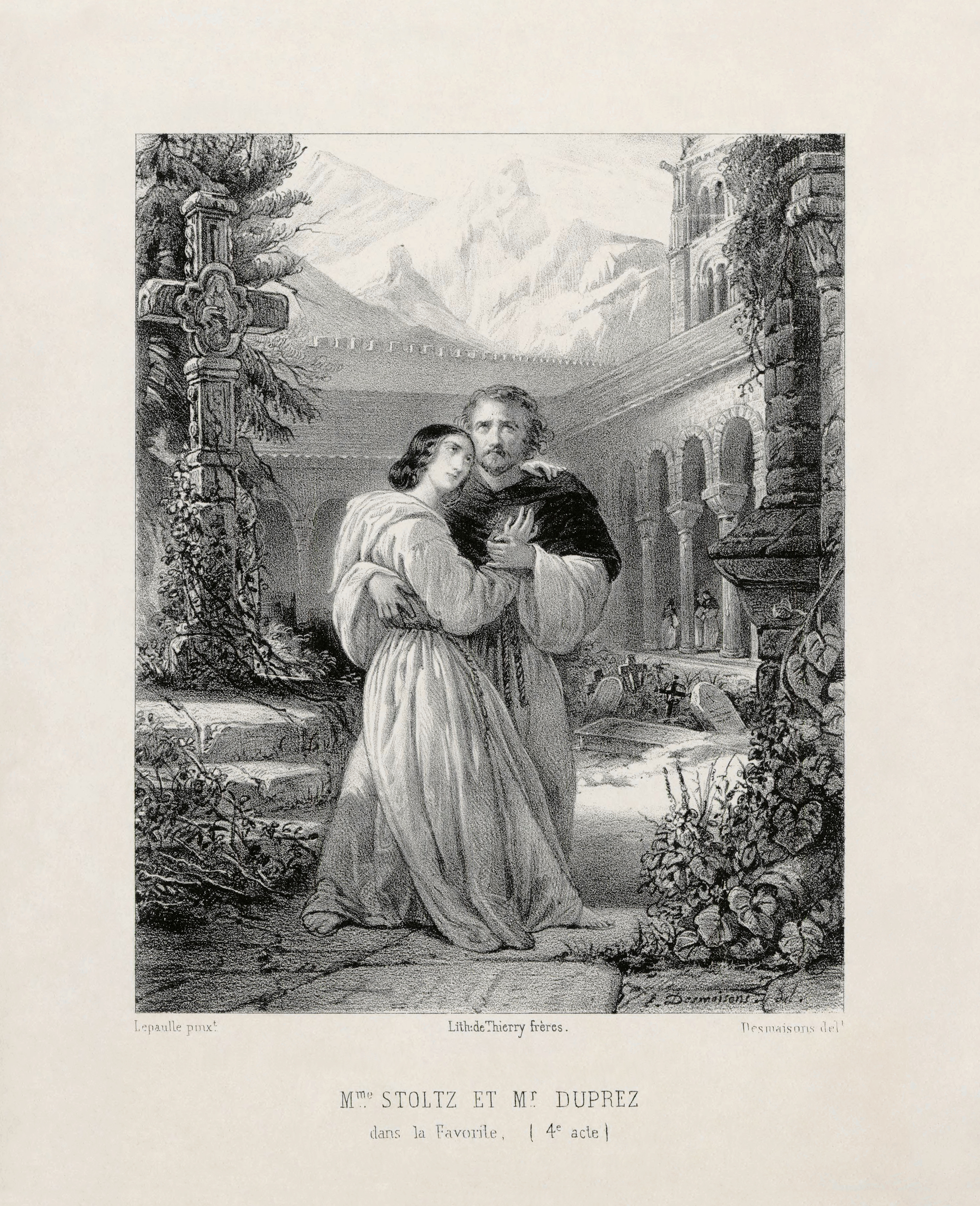
With Gilbert Duprez in La favorite

This list is based on Pitou, unless otherwise noted.

- Ricciarda in Halévy's Guido et Ginevra on 5 March 1838
- Ascanio in Berlioz's Benvenuto Cellini on 3 September 1838
- Marguerite in Auber's Le lac des fées on 1 April 1839
- Lazarillo in Marliani's La xacarilla on 28 October 1839
- Loyse in Bazin's cantata Loyse de Montfort on 7 October 1840
- Léonor in Donizetti's La favorite on 2 December 1840
- Agathe in Weber's Le freischütz (French adaptation of Der Freischütz) on 7 June 1841
- Catarina in Halévy's La reine de Chypre on 22 December 1841
- Odette in Halévy's Charles VI on 15 March 1843
- Zayda in Donizetti's Dom Sébastien, roi de Portugal on 13 November 1843
- Beppo in Halévy's Le lazzarone on 29 March 1844
- Desdémone in Rossini's Othello (French adaptation of Otello) on 2 September 1844
- Marie Stuart in Niedermeyer's Marie Stuart on 6 December 1844
- Estrelle in Balfe's L'étoile de Séville on 17 December 1845
- David in Mermet's David on 3 June 1846
- Marie in the Rossini pastiche Robert Bruce on 30 December 1846
