= Adèle Dumilâtre =

French dancer (1821–1909)

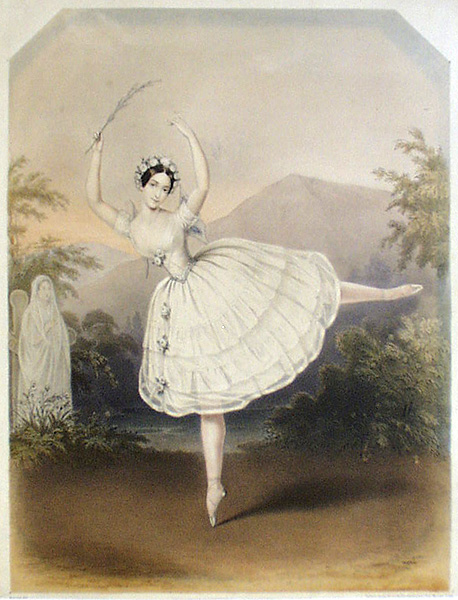
- Lithograph by Jules Bouvier, 1843
- Born: Adèle Alphonsine Dumilâtre; 30 June 1821; Paris, France
- Died: 4 May 1909 (aged 88); Paris, France
- Spouse: Francisco Drake del Castillo
- Children: 3
- Parent: Michel Dumilâtre

Adèle Alphonsine Dumilâtre (French pronunciation: [adɛl alfɔ̃sin dymilatʁ]; 30 June 1821 – 4 May 1909 in Paris) was a French dancer, famous in the days of romantic ballet. After her marriage to Francisco Drake del Castillo she became a Countess.

== Biography ==
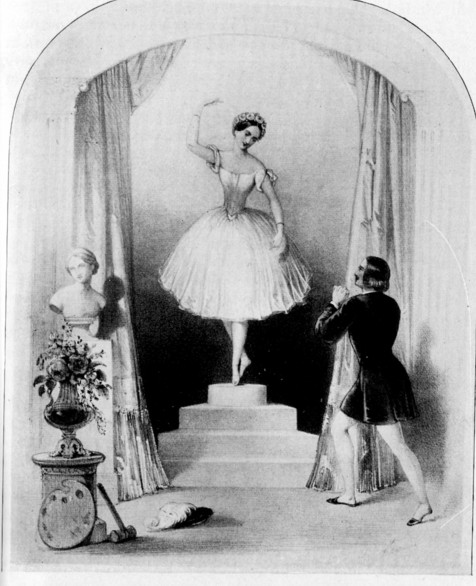
Marble Maiden, Dumilâtre and Lucien Petipa, Paris (1847)

The youngest daughter of Comédie-Française actor Michel Dumilâtre, she studied dance with Charles Petit.

Adèle's dancing with the lightness of figure that was in vogue in the 1830s gave her a sense of airiness. She danced in the Ballet of the Paris Opera from 1840 to 1848. She played the role of Myrtha in Giselle on 28 June 1841, together with Carlotta Grisi and Lucien Petipa. She was also known for her role in the opera Martha. She danced the lead role in La Sylphide and also in Lady Henriette (1844). She danced with much success in Milan and London, where she performed Arthur Saint-Léon's The Marble Maiden in 1845. She performed at Her Majesty's Theatre (1843), the Theatre Royal, Drury Lane (1844–45), and La Scala (1846). The Times described her dancing as being "so ethereal ... that she almost looked transparent." Adèle and Eugene Coralli performed in the choreography of La Gypsy (in Act II) by Joseph Mazilier (the dancer, balletmaster and choreographer).By 1848, however, her performance in Griseldis was characterized as disappointing.

Her older sister, Sophie, also danced at the Paris Opera from 1838 to 1845. They were nicknamed "les sœurs Demi-Lattes", the half-lath sisters, because of their thinness. Achille Deveria drew Adèle Dumilâtre with Jean Coralli. After retiring from the ballet, she married Francisco Drake del Castillo and became a Countess. When widowed, she went to live with her sister before moving to Touraine with her two sons and a daughter.

Dumilâtre died in Paris at her home in the Rue Cler at the approach of her 88th birthday and is buried in the Montmartre Cemetery.

== Bibliography ==
- Jowitt, Deborah (1989). Time and the Dancing Image. University of California Press. ISBN 978-0-520-06627-4.
