= Dom Sébastien =

Opera by Gaetano Donizetti

Dom Sébastien, Roi de Portugal
- Grand opera by Gaetano Donizetti
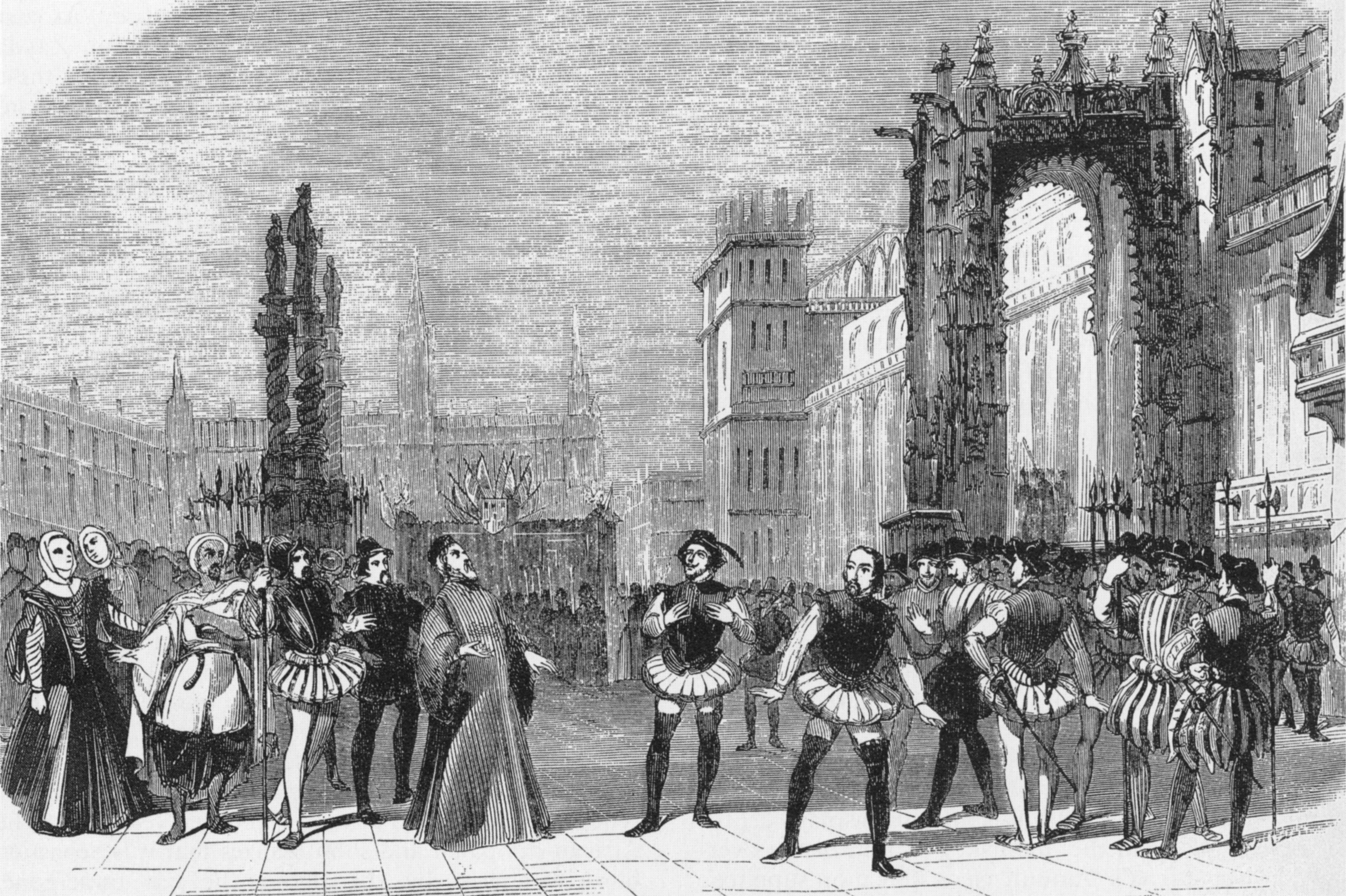
- Act 3 in the original production, as the Grand Inquisitor orders the arrest of Dom Sébastien (engraving from L'Illustration)
- Librettist: Eugène Scribe
- Language: French
- Based on: Paul Foucher's Don Sébastien de Portugal
- Premiere: 9 November 1843; Théâtre de la Porte-Saint-Martin, Paris

Dom Sébastien, Roi de Portugal (Don Sebastian, King of Portugal) is a French grand opera in five acts by Gaetano Donizetti. The libretto was written by Eugène Scribe, based on Paul Foucher's play Don Sébastien de Portugal which premiered at the Théâtre de la Porte-Saint-Martin on 9 November 1838. It is a historic-fiction about King Sebastian of Portugal (1554–1578) and his ill-fated 1578 expedition to Morocco. The opera premiered on 13 November 1843 at the Salle Le Peletier of the Paris Opéra. This was the last opera that Donizetti completed before going insane as a result of syphilis.

At the time, Donizetti was attempting to compose an opera competitive with similar historical operas by Daniel Auber, Fromental Halévy and Giacomo Meyerbeer. One critical description of the nature of Dom Sébastien is "a funeral in five acts". By contrast, Winton Dean has described the main characteristic of the opera as "uncompromising dramatic honesty" in his comments on unusual dramatic facets of the work. Mary Ann Smart has prepared a critical edition of the opera in French, which includes appendices with variants and additions that Donizetti made for a production in German at the Vienna Hofoper in 1845.

== Roles ==
Role	Voice type	Premiere cast, 13 November 1843 (Conductor: – )
Dom Sébastien, King of Portugal	tenor	Gilbert Duprez
Dom Antonio, his Uncle, regent of the kingdom in his absence	tenor	Jean-Baptiste Octave
Dom Juam de Sylva, Grand Inquisitor	bass	Nicolas Levasseur
Le Camoëns, soldier and poet	baritone	Paul Barroilhet
Dom Henrique, lieutenant of Dom Sébastien	bass	Ferdinand Prévost
Ben-Selim, governor of Fez	bass	Hippolyte Brémont
Abayaldos, head of the Arab tribes, fiancé of Zayda	baritone	Jean-Étienne-Auguste Massol
Zayda, daughter of Ben-Selim	mezzo-soprano	Rosine Stoltz
Dom Luis	tenor	
Soldier	bass	
First Inquisitor	tenor	
Second Inquisitor	tenor	
Third Inquisitor	bass	
Chorus: Gentlemen and ladies and of the court of Portugal, Portuguese soldiers and sailors, Arab soldiers and women, members of the Inquisition, men and women of the people

== Synopsis ==
Time: 16th century
Place: Lisbon and Morocco

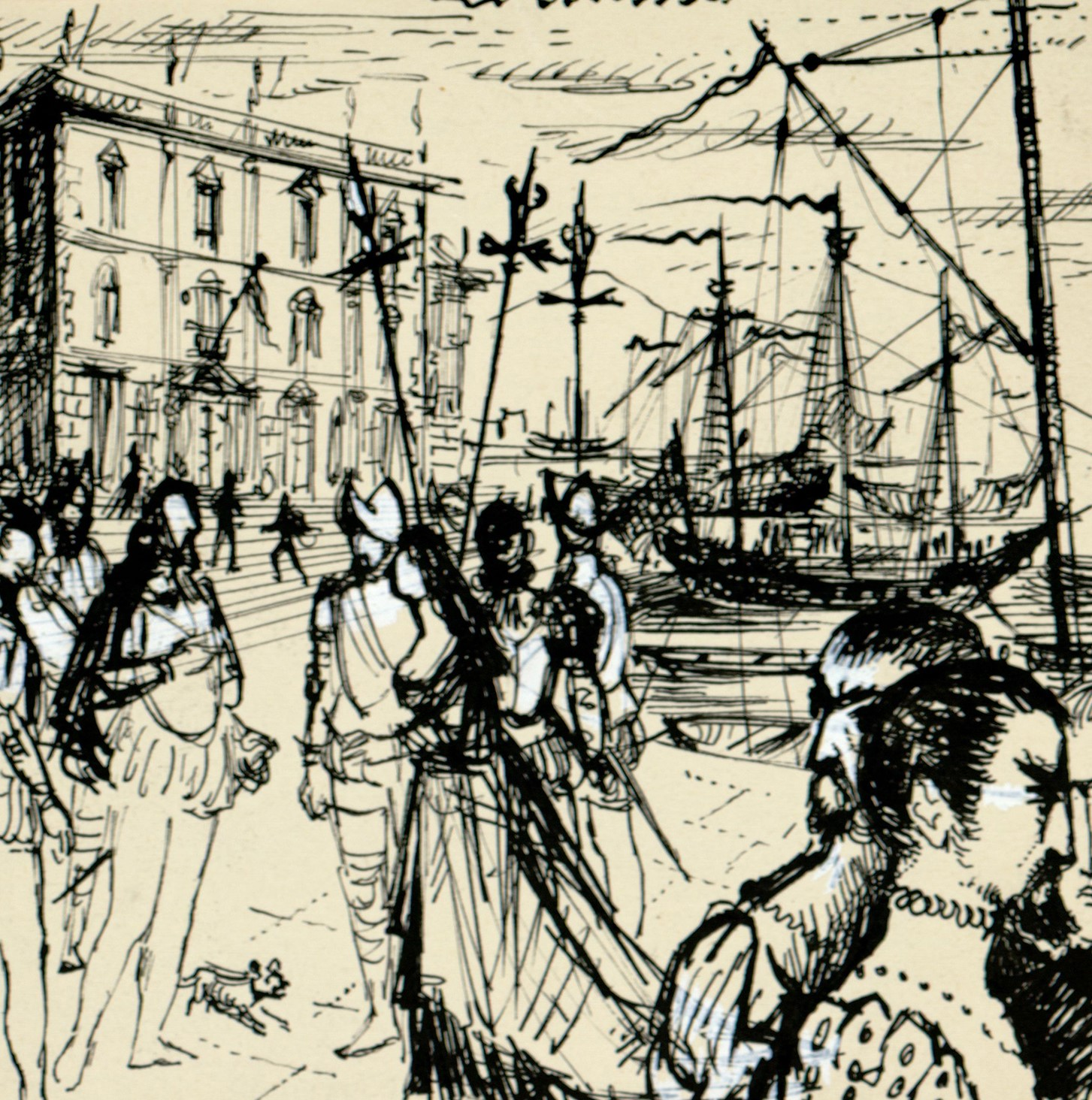
Disegno per copertina di libretto, drawing for Don Sebastiano (undated).

=== Act 1 ===
Lisbon

The Christian king, Dom Sébastian, leaves his uncle Dom Antonio to rule Portugal while he goes on a crusade against the Moors of Africa. Sébastian's entourage includes the idealistic poet Camoëns and the Moor princess Zayda, whom he had rescued from being burnt at the stake for trying to escape the monastery she had resided in since her conversion to Christianity (O mon Dieu, sur la terre). He intends to return her to her father Ben-Selim.

=== Act 2 ===
Fez, Morocco

The reunion between Zayda and Ben-Selim is dampened by her refusal to marry the Moorish chief Abayaldos.

A battlefield in Morocco

Abayaldos led the Moors to battle against Sébastian's forces and mostly wiped them out. The wounded Sébastian's life is saved only when his lieutenant Dom Henrique presents himself to Abayaldos as Sébastian, before expiring from his own wounds, and Zayda pleads for "the Christian's" life (the real Sébastian) in return for her consent to marry Abayaldos, reasoning that her life was saved by a Christian during her captivity in Portugal and that the favor must be returned. Sébastian is left on the battlefield a broken man (Seul sur la terre).

=== Act 3 ===
A public square, Lisbon

Camoëns has survived the battle and returned to Lisbon (O Lisbonne, o ma patrie!) where he learns that Antonio has aligned himself with the Spanish Grand Inquisitor Dom Juan de Sylva and usurped the throne. He runs into Sébastian, just as the funeral procession for the supposedly dead king passes by. Camoëns causes a commotion in his outrage, and Sébastian is recognized by the people when he intervenes. Abayaldos, for his part, recognizes the lowly "Christian" whose life he had spared. Sébastian is jailed as an imposter.

=== Act 4 ===
A court of law, Lisbon

At Sébastian's trial, Zayda proves her love for him by testifying to his true identity and how he escaped death. Abayaldos accuses her of infidelity, and now both Sébastian and Zayda are jailed, she for treason.

=== Act 5 ===
The Lisbon Court

Eager to legitimize his deal with Spain, Antonio offers to spare Sébastian's life if Zayda can convince Sébastian to sign the official instrument selling Portugal to Spain. After first refusing, Sébastian signs. Free but distraught, Zayda runs out to drown herself.

A tower guarding the entrance to Lisbon Harbor (anachronistically the Belém Tower, the symbol of Portuguese independence)

Sébastian catches up with Zayda at the top of the tower. They see Camoëns in a boat attempting to rescue them. Sébastian and Zayda climb down a rope to the boat but are discovered halfway down; they plunge to their deaths when the rope is slashed. Camoëns is killed by gunfire and, at the curtain, the Spanish fleet emerges on the horizon. Portugal has lost its independence.

== Recordings ==
Year	Cast (Zaida, Dom Sébastien, Camoëns, Dom Juan de Silva)	Conductor, Opera house and orchestra	Label
1984	Klára Takács, Richard Leech, Lajos Miller, Sergei Koptchak	Eve Queler, Opera Orchestra of New York and Schola Cantorum of New York (Recording of a concert performance in Carnegie Hall, 23 March)	CD: Legato Classics; Cat: LCD 190-2
1998	Monica Minarelli, Robert Woroniecki, Ettore Kim, Randall Jakobsh	Elio Boncompagni, Sinfonie Orchester Aachen and Aachener Städische Theater Chorus	CD: Kicco Classic; Cat: KCO18CD-1/2
2005	Vesselina Kasarova, Giuseppe Filianoti, Carmelo Corrado-Caruso, Alastair Miles	Mark Elder, Orchestra and Chorus of the Royal Opera House, Concert performance recorded live 10 and 13 September 2005 at ROH Covent Garden	Audio CD: Opera Rara; Cat: ORC 33
