= Gilbert Duprez =

French tenor, singing teacher and minor composer

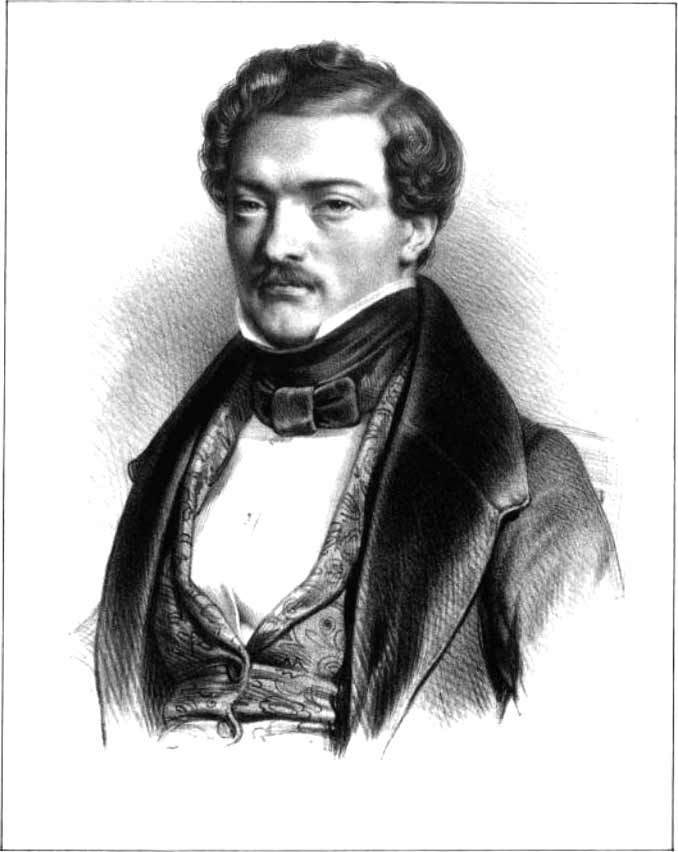
Gilbert Duprez

Gilbert-Louis Duprez (6 December 1806 – 23 September 1896) was a French tenor, singing teacher and minor composer who famously pioneered the delivery of the operatic high C from the chest (Ut de poitrine, as Paris audiences called it). He also created the role of Edgardo in the popular bel canto-era opera Lucia di Lammermoor in 1835.

== Biography ==
Gilbert-Louis Duprez was born in Paris. He studied singing, music theory, and composition with Alexandre-Étienne Choron and made his operatic début at the Odéon in 1825 as Count Almaviva in Rossini's Il barbiere di Siviglia. He worked in that theatre without much success until 1828, when he decided to try his luck in Italy. There, the operatic scene was more active and developed. As a result, Duprez was able to immerse himself in work, beginning principally with tenore contraltino roles such as Idreno in Semiramide and Rodrigo in Otello, both by Rossini. He appeared, too, as Gualtiero in Bellini's Il pirata. The latter role proved to be his first undisputed stage success, probably because it was free of elaborate coloratura passages, which were not considered to be his strong suit as a vocalist.

In 1831, in Lucca, Duprez took part in the premiere Italian performance of Guglielmo Tell, singing for the first time (in an opera theatre) a high C sung not in the so-called falsettone register, as other tenors of that time were accustomed to do, but with a full voice, often described as coming "from the chest". His Italian career then proceeded on a highly successful course. It embraced, among other things, two premieres of operas by Donizetti, namely, Parisina (Donizetti) (in the role of Ugo) at Florence in 1832, and, more significantly, Lucia di Lammermoor (in the role of Edgardo) at Naples' San Carlo in 1835.

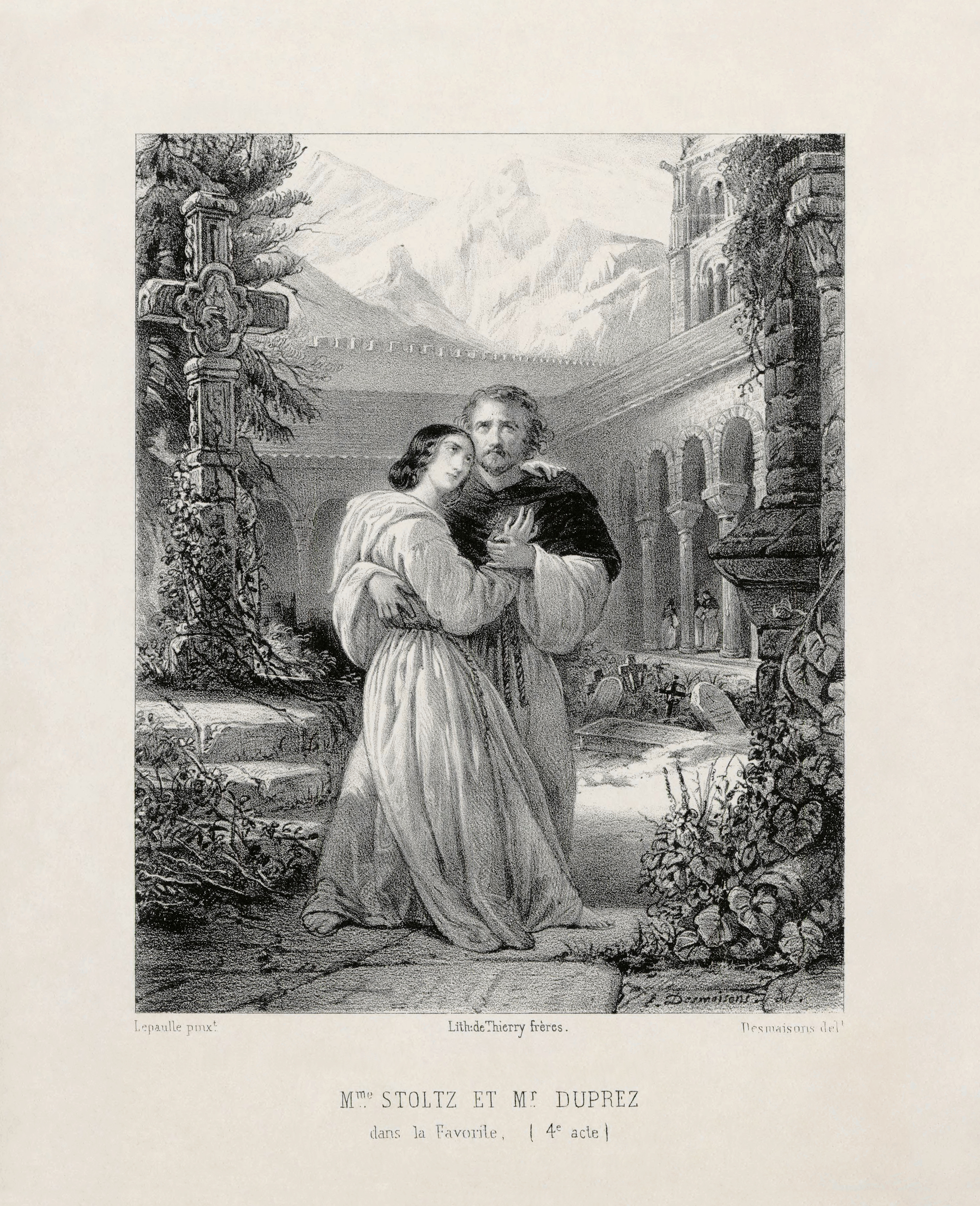
With Rosine Stoltz in La favorite

His Italian reputation strongly established, Duprez returned to Paris in 1837 and scored an immediate success at the Opéra with his exciting new style of vocal delivery as exemplified in William Tell. Consequently, he obtained equal billing with Adolphe Nourrit as "principal tenor" of the theatre. Nourrit responded by leaving for Italy in emulation of his competitor; but unlike Duprez, he failed to master the new singing style during studies with Donizetti and committed suicide.

Duprez maintained his leading position at the Opéra until 1849, singing the title role in the première of Berlioz's Benvenuto Cellini in 1838, and taking part in several further Donizetti premieres, including those of La favorite (as Fernand) and Les Martyrs (as Poliuto), both in 1840, and Dom Sébastien (in the title role), in 1843. Ironically the role of Poliuto, which Donizetti had written expressly for Nourrit in order to help him to maintain his exalted position, was to become associated in the public's mind with Duprez.

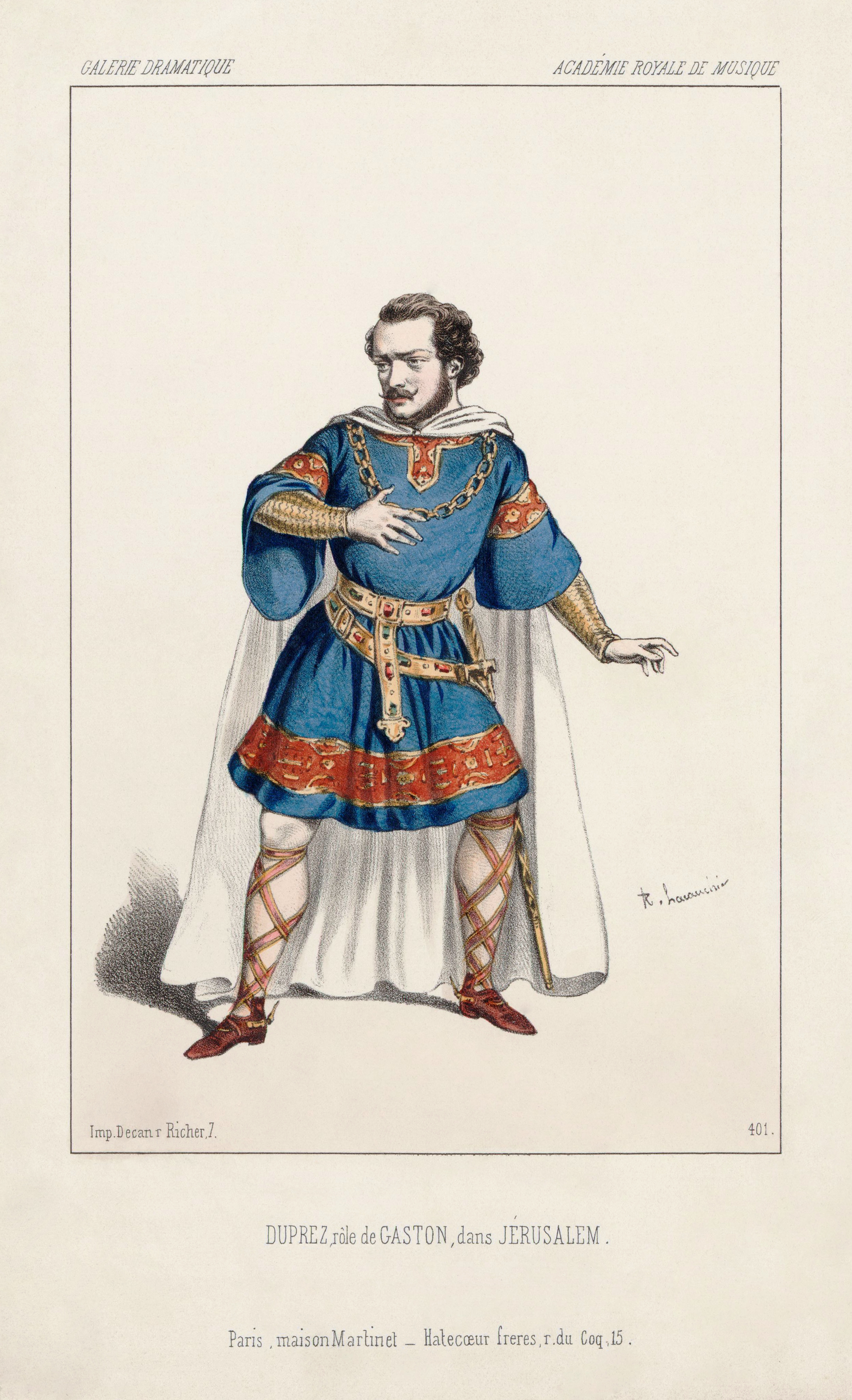
As Gaston in the première performance of Giuseppe Verdi's Jérusalem.

After singing in London at the Drury Lane theatre in the years 1843–1844, Duprez began to cut back on his stage performances, with a notable exception being the lead role in Giuseppe Verdi's Jérusalem. His last public appearance was in 1851 in Lucia di Lammermoor at the Théâtre des Italiens. He then devoted himself to teaching, first at Paris's Conservatoire (where he had been appointed to a professorship as far back as 1842), and afterwards privately. His students included Belgian tenor Eloi Sylva and the celebrated French virtuoso bass Pol Plançon (1851–1914), whose voice is preserved on gramophone recordings made in 1902–1908. Duprez also devised a system of written exercises for singers and composed a few less than successful operettas.

In his 1880 book Souvenirs d'un chanteur, Duprez, a close friend of Donizetti's, related in deeply felt terms the bitter setbacks and obstructions which the Bergamo composer had suffered in the theatrical world.

Duprez died at Poissy, near Paris, in 1896. He was the father of soprano Caroline Duprez.

== Vocal character ==
One can differentiate two distinct phases in Duprez's artistic life. Initially, being equipped by nature with a clear but comparatively thin voice, he appears to have stood in the French haute-contre tradition of singing. So, when he first went to Italy, he naturally assumed equivalent tenore contraltino roles in operas written by Rossini. However, he failed to make any great impression on Italian audiences with his Rossinian endeavours, perhaps because of his deeply rooted disinclination to indulge in displays of coloratura.

While in Italy, he began by modelling himself on the bel-canto tenor Rubini, whose bravura vocalism was a byword for sweetness and elegiac inflexion. Soon, however, he found a new source of inspiration in the person of Domenico Donzelli, the then greatest living "baritonal" tenor. Donzelli possessed a robust voice and a deliberately darkened timbre, coupled with firmly accented diction, immense nobility of phrasing and a vibrant, intense method of acting. The merging of Rubini and Donzelli's contrasting styles in Duprez, and the introduction of the famous high C from the chest (which soon became a standard feature of Romantic singing), gave rise to a fresh category of tenor, the tenore di forza. The dramatic tenor of the present day is a direct descendant in terms of range, tessitura and tonal thrust from this kind of mid-19th century voice first exemplified by Duprez.

Duprez was a small man and, regrettably, the chest high C was an element of his vocal mechanism which soon took a toll on his physical resources. According to Berlioz, his voice sounded "hardened" as early as 1838, at the premiere of Benvenuto Cellini, and over the next 10 years, despite some isolated successes, his singing continued to deteriorate. Finally, Duprez was driven into an early retirement from the stage and he took up teaching.

== Musical and dramatic works ==
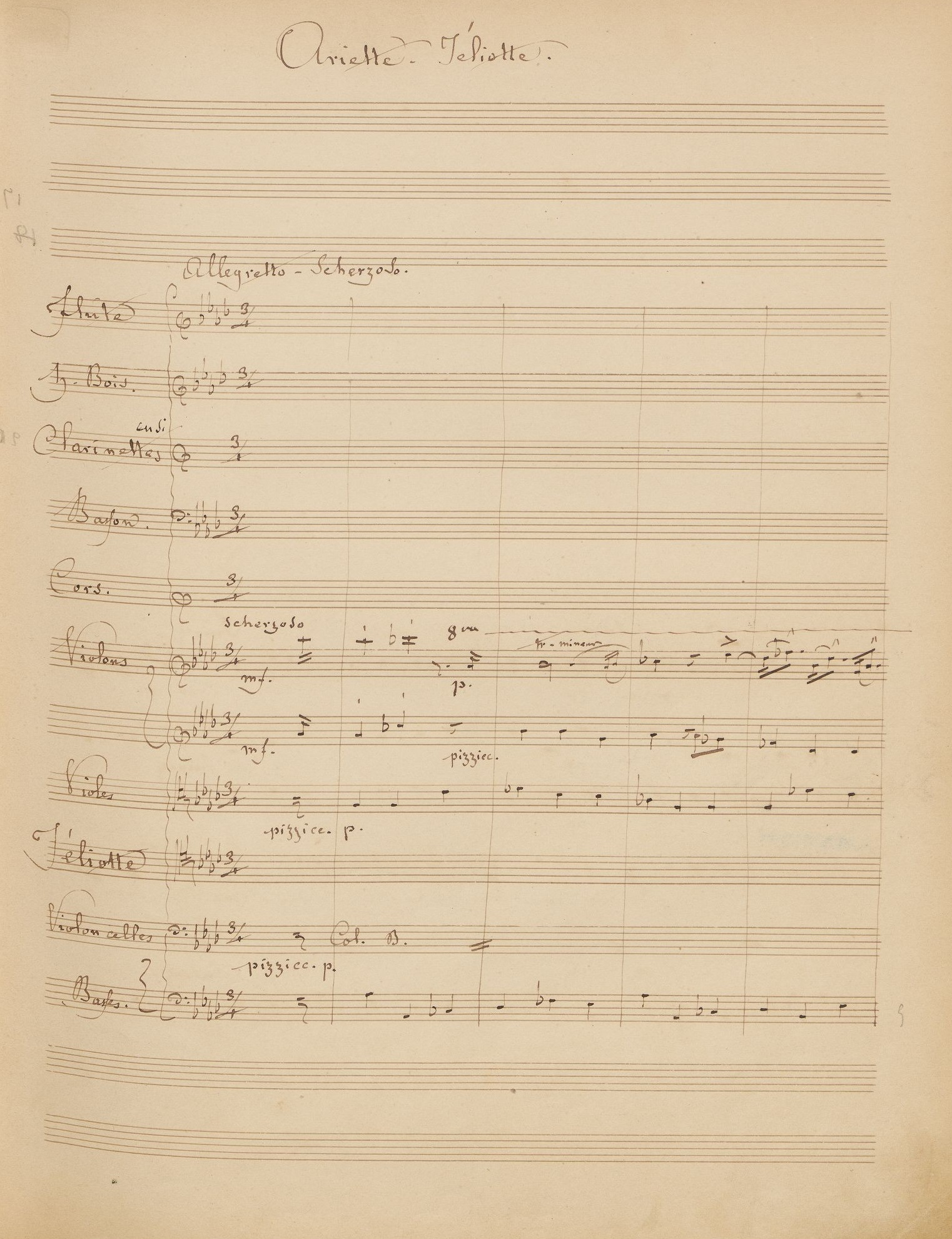
Duprez's original manuscript from Jéliotte, 1853

(List from German Wikipedia)

- La Cabane du pechêur, Comic Opera (Libretto: Edmond Duprez), 1st prodn. 1826
- Le Songe du Comte Egmont, Lyric Scena (Libretto: Edmond Duprez), 1st prodn. 1842
- La Lettre au bon Dieu, Comic Opera (Libretto: Eugène Scribe), 1st prodn. 1853
- Jéliotte, or Un Passe-temps de duchesse, Operetta, 1st prodn. 1854
- Samson, Operetta (Libretto by Edmond Duprez after Alexandre Dumas père), 1st prodn. 1857
- Amélina, 1860
- La pazzia della regina, 1st prodn. 1877
- Tariotti
- Zephora

== Published writings ==
- L'art du chant, Paris, 1845 (accessible online in a French / German 1846 edition at IMSLP)
- La mélodie: Études complémentaires vocales et dramatiques de 'L'art du chant' , Paris, Au Ménestrel, 1874 (accessible online at IMSLP)
- Souvenirs d'un chanteur, Paris, Levy, 1880 (accessible online at Gallica - B.N.F.)
- Récréations de mon grand áge (2 volumes), Paris, 1888
