= Nicolas Levasseur =

French opera singer

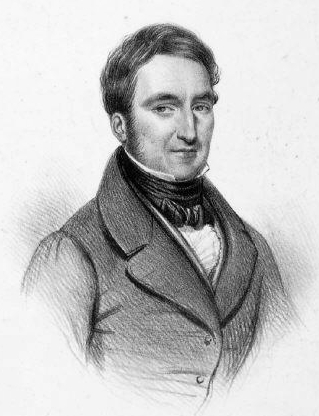
Nicolas-Prosper Levasseur

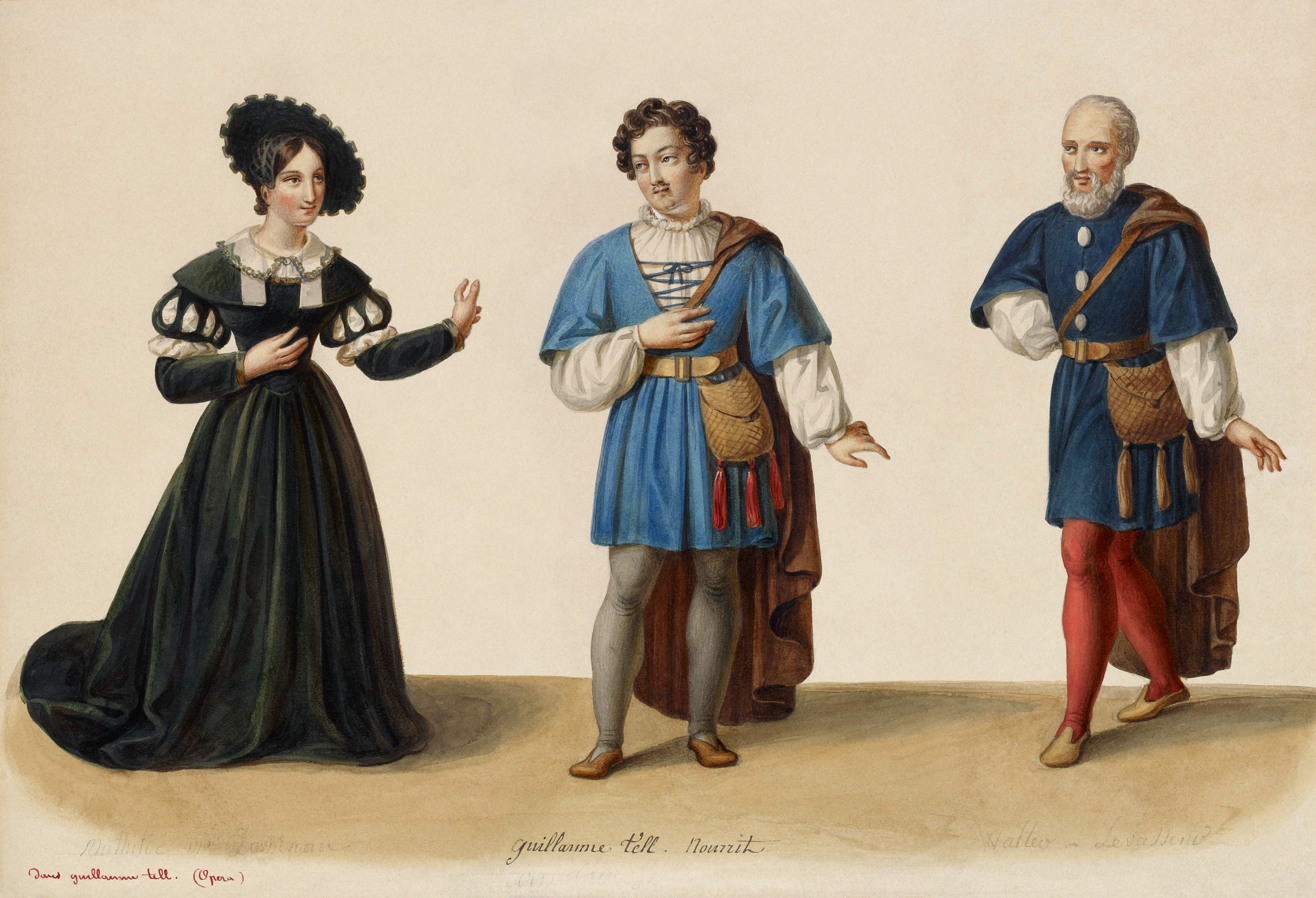
Costume designs by Eugène Du Faget for the original production of William Tell, with Nicolas Levasseur as Walter Furst on the right.

Nicolas Levasseur (9 March 1791 – 7 December 1871) was a French bass, particularly associated with Rossini roles.

Born Nicolas-Prosper Levasseur at Bresles, Oise, he studied at the Paris Music Conservatory from 1807 to 1811, with Pierre-Jean Garat. He made his professional debut at the Paris Opéra in 1813, as Osman Pacha, in La caravane du Caire by André Grétry. He sang in London at the King's Theatre from 1815 to 1817, notably as the Count in Mozart's Le nozze di Figaro. He also sang at La Scala in Milan, from 1820 to 1822, where he took part in the creation of Meyerbeer's Margherita d'Anjou.

But his greatest successes were at the Théâtre-Italien in Paris, where he sang from 1819 until 1828. There his name became closely associated with Rossini's operas. He sang in the Paris premieres of Mosè in Egitto, Ricciardo e Zoraide, La cenerentola, La donna del lago, and he participated in the creation of Il viaggio a Reims.

Levasseur returned to the Paris Opéra in 1827 and remained there until 1853, where he created all the great basso cantante roles, notably in operas such as; Le comte Ory, Guillaume Tell, Robert le diable, La juive, Les Huguenots, La favorite, Dom Sebastien, Le prophète, etc.

Levasseur was considered peerless in his time, possessing a voice of remarkable beauty and grandeur. He taught at the Paris Conservatory from 1841 until 1870. He also taught privately; among his pupils was Euphrasie Borghèse. He died in Paris.

== Sources ==
- Guide de l’opéra, Les indispensables de la musique, R. Mancini & J-J. Rouvereux (Fayard, 1995). ISBN 2-213-59567-4
