= La Esmeralda (opera) =

1836 opera by Louise Bertin

- Grand opera by Louise Bertin
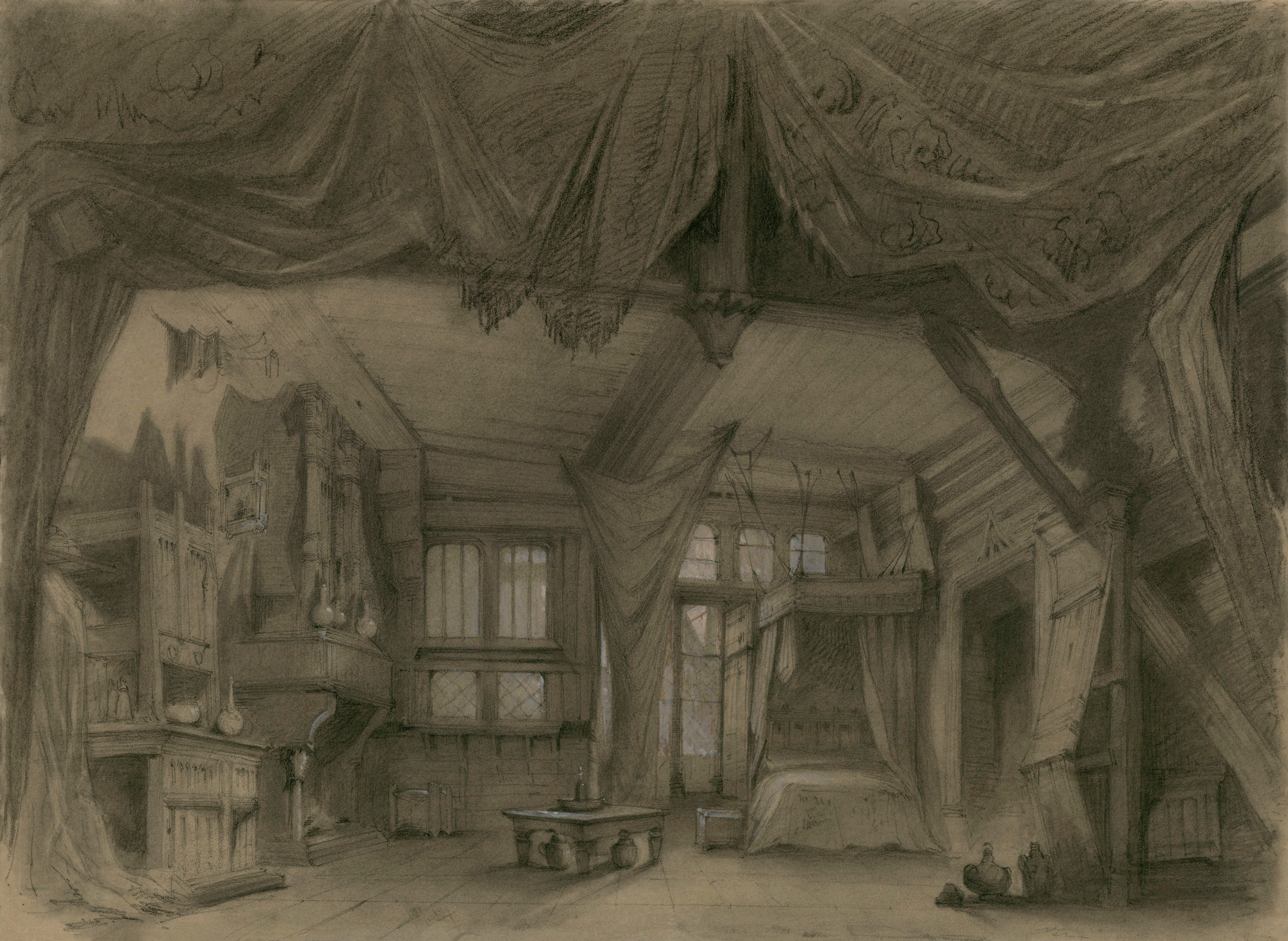
- Stage design by Cambon for act 3, scene 2
- Librettist: Victor Hugo
- Language: French
- Based on: Notre-Dame de Paris
- Premiere: 14 November 1836; Théâtre de l'Académie Royale de Musique, Paris

La Esmeralda is a grand opera in four acts composed by Louise Bertin. The libretto was written by Victor Hugo, who had adapted it from his 1831 novel Notre-Dame de Paris (The Hunchback of Notre Dame). The opera premiered at the Théâtre de l'Académie Royale de Musique in Paris on 14 November 1836 with Cornélie Falcon in the title role. Despite the lavish production, the premiere was a failure, and La Esmeralda proved to be the last opera composed by Bertin, although she lived for another 40 years.

== Background ==
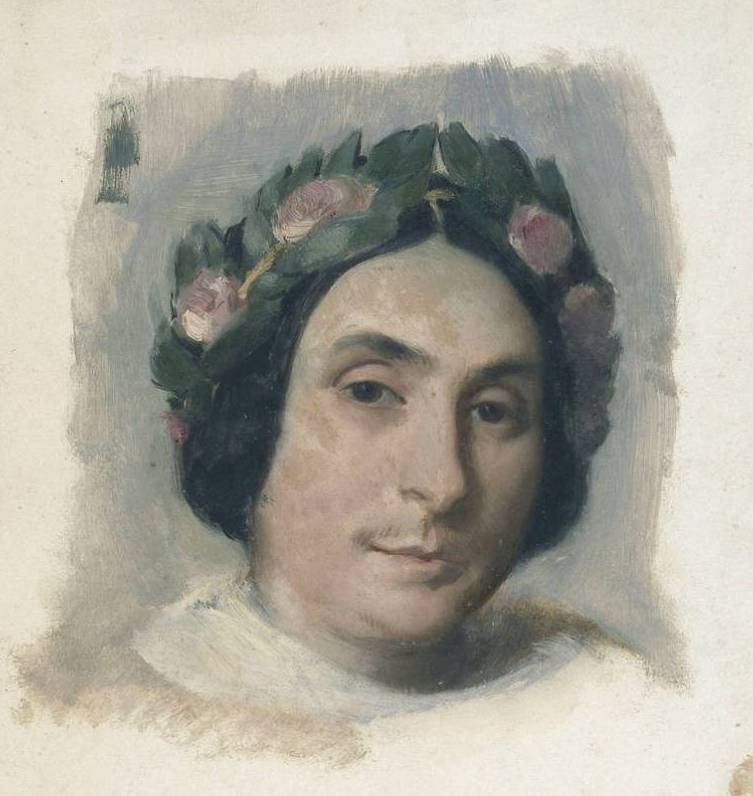
Louise Bertin, the composer of La Esmeralda, in a portrait by Victor Mottez

Partially paralyzed from birth, and basically chair-bound, Louise Bertin had been somewhat of a child prodigy. She painted, wrote poetry, and when she was only 19 composed her first opera, Guy Mannering for which she also wrote the libretto based on Sir Walter Scott's novel, Guy Mannering or The Astrologer. Two of her later operas were produced at the Opéra-Comique, Le loup-garou (The Werewolf) in 1827 and Fausto in 1831 (again with a libretto by Bertin, this time adapted from Johann Wolfgang von Goethe's play Faust).

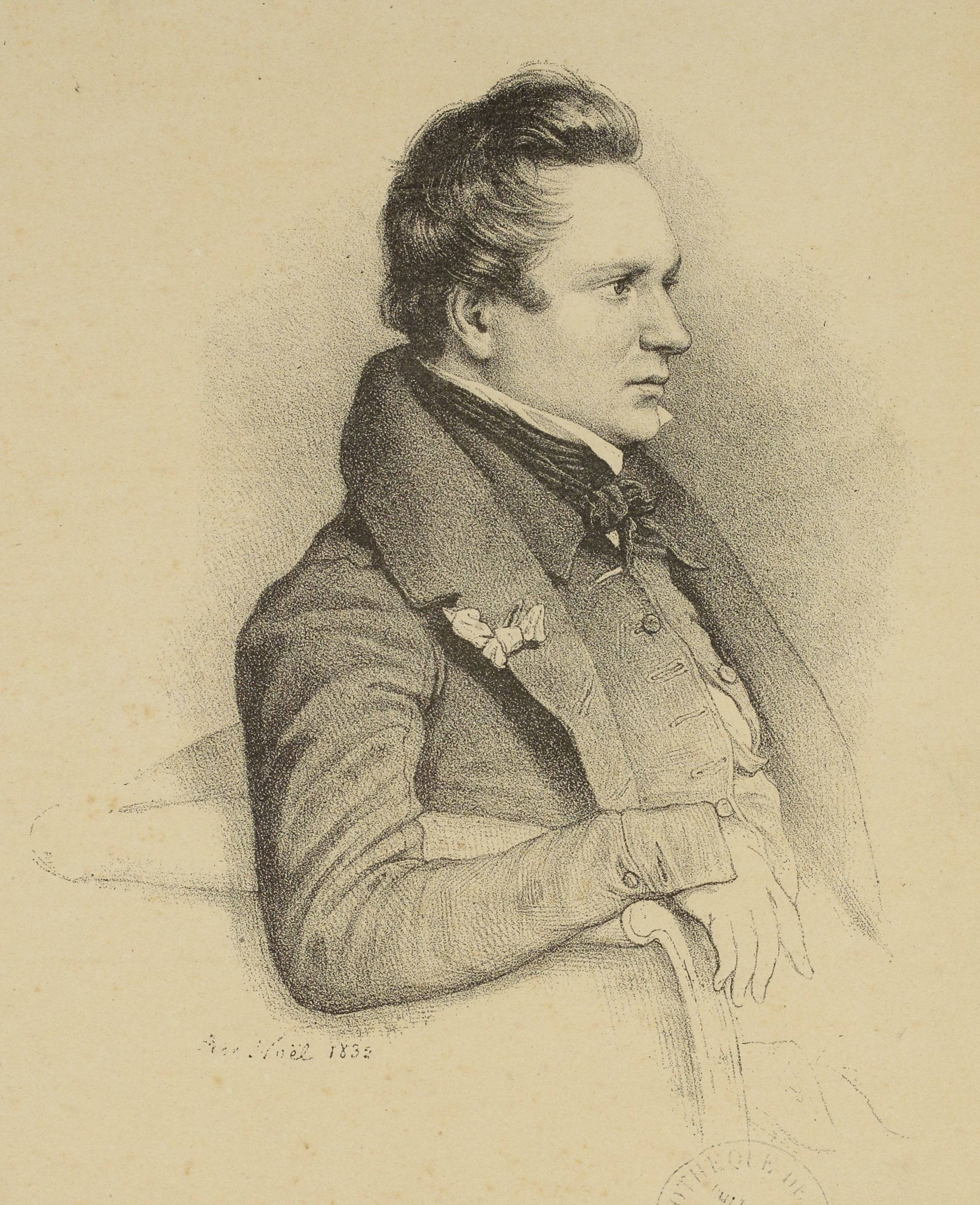
Victor Hugo, the librettist of La Esmeralda, in an 1832 portrait by Alphonse-Léon Noël

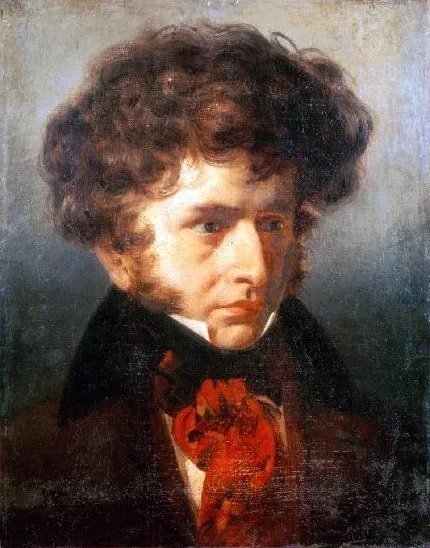
Hector Berlioz, who supervised the rehearsals, in an 1832 portrait by Émile Signol

Although many of Victor Hugo's plays and novels were later adapted as operas (e.g. Hernani, Ruy Blas, Le roi s'amuse, Angelo, Tyrant of Padua, Marie Tudor, and Lucrèce Borgia), La Esmeralda was the first and only libretto which he wrote himself in direct collaboration with the composer. Shortly after he completed The Hunchback of Notre-Dame in 1830, Hugo began sketching out an operatic adaptation. The success of the novel had brought him many offers from composers anxious to turn it into an opera, including Meyerbeer and Berlioz. He had declined those proposals, but according to Hugo's wife, he changed his mind out of friendship for the Bertin family. In September 1832, while Hugo was staying with the Bertins, Louise, supported by her father Louis-François Bertin, asked him for permission to create an opera from the work. He immediately commenced work on a libretto, completing it on his return to Paris (despite the frenzy of rehearsals for his play Le Roi s'amuse), and sending Louise the first draft manuscript on 30 October 1832.

The process of preparing the final libretto was slow, and rehearsals for the opera did not begin until over three years after Hugo wrote the first lines. Bertin's requests for lines of various lengths to fit the music partly contributed to this as well as the task of condensing a long novel into a four-hour opera. Many of the characters were eliminated including Jehan Frollo, the dissolute younger brother of the chief antagonist Claude Frollo, although some aspects of his character were incorporated into Claude's. The titular character of the novel, Quasimodo, has a much reduced role in the opera, which concentrates more on the love story between Esmeralda and Phoebus. At Bertin's request, the ending of the novel was also changed with Esmeralda escaping execution. In 1834, Notre-Dame de Paris had been placed on the Index Librorum Prohibitorum, the list of works condemned by the Catholic Church. The opera libretto was submitted to the censors in January 1836 who required the title to be changed to La Esmeralda and all references to Claude Frollo as a priest to be removed. (The printed libretto which was sold prior to the premiere did have the change of title but retained the use of "priest" regardless, and some of the singers at the premiere sang the original lines, claiming they had forgotten which words were censored.)

No expense was spared for the production. The four principal roles were assigned to the reigning stars of the Paris Opera: Cornélie Falcon, Adolphe Nourrit, Nicolas Levasseur and Jean-Étienne Massol. The well-known interior and theatrical designers Humanité-René Philastre and Charles-Antoine Cambon designed the sets and costumes. Bertin's limited mobility made it difficult for her to participate in the rehearsals, and her father commissioned Berlioz to conduct the rehearsals and direct the singers. Berlioz found the experience dispiriting. The singers and orchestra were unenthusiastic, and showed it during the rehearsals. There were also backstage rumblings that the opera was only being produced because of the Bertin family's influence and a persistent rumor that Berlioz had written the best arias in the piece, a back-handed compliment which he firmly denied. He wrote to Franz Liszt, "What an inferno that whole world is, an ice-cold inferno!" Hugo was travelling in Brittany and absent for almost all the rehearsals. According to Adèle Hugo, on his return he was not pleased with the set and costume designs, finding, in his opinion, "nothing rich nor picturesque." In particular, he found the use of obviously new cloth to clothe the beggars and vagabonds inappropriate and blurred the distinction between the social classes.

== Performance history ==
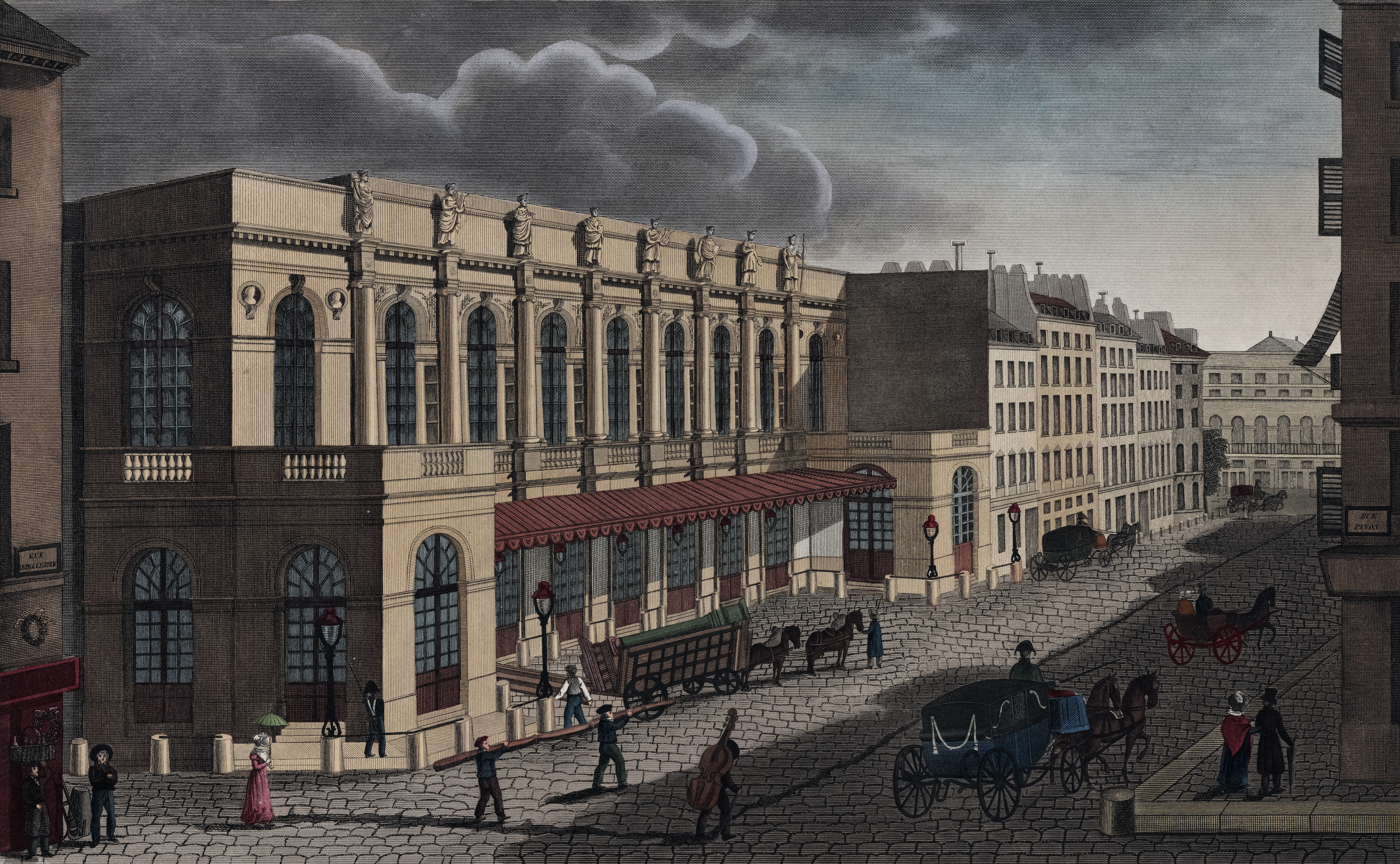
Théâtre de l'Académie Royale de Musique where La Esmeralda premiered in 1836

La Esmeralda premiered on 14 November 1836 at the Théâtre de l'Académie Royale de Musique in Paris. There was some disruption at the premiere, as members of the audience who disliked the Bertin family shouted out that the work had been written by Berlioz. Berlioz himself denied this accusation, and labelled Bertin a "writer and a musician of considerable distinction and one of the most intelligent women of our time". There were also accusations that it had only been performed because of her brother's connection to the administration of the Paris Opera and the family's directorship of the influential newspaper, Journal des débats (to which both Victor Hugo and Berlioz were contributors) led to open disdain by those who opposed the newspaper's political stance. There were hisses and groans, and after the one aria, Quasimodo's "Air des Cloches" ("Song of the Bells") in act 4, several members of the audience, including Alexandre Dumas, shouted "It's by Berlioz!". The opera's initial run ended after six performances. At the sixth performance, on 16 December 1836, it was reportedly shortened to three acts and was followed by the ballet La Fille du Danube, starring Marie Taglioni. A near-riot occurred during this performance. The anti-Bertin faction began shouting "Down with Bertin!" "Down with the Journal des débats!" "Bring down the curtain!" They continued until Cornélie Falcon fled the stage and the curtain was lowered; it was not raised again until the ballet began. Despite later accounts describing this as the opera's final performance, La Esmeralda subsequently returned to the Paris Opéra repertory with further performances in 1837 and 1838, the 20th and final taking place on 21 December 1838. The last three recorded appearances consisted of Act I only. Louise Bertin would never compose another opera, although she lived for another 40 years. In her memoirs, Adèle Hugo wrote of the opera's final word, "Fatalité!":

A first fatality was this suppression of a work the singers of which were M. Nourrit and Mademoiselle Falcon, the composer a woman of great talent, the librettist M. Victor Hugo, and the subject Notre-Dame de Paris. The fatality followed the actors. Mademoiselle Falcon lost her voice; M. Nourrit soon after committed suicide in Italy. A ship called Esmeralda, crossing from England to Ireland, was lost, vessel and cargo. The Duke of Orleans named a mare of great value Esmeralda and in a steeple-chase she ran against a horse at a gallop and got her head broken.

The full orchestral score was never published. However, the autograph manuscript is held in the Bibliothèque nationale de France and a copy in the library of the Paris Opera. Franz Liszt's version of the score reduced for piano and voice was published by Troupenas in 1837 and republished in 2009 by Lucie Gallande. The first act, revised to include the principal arias from the rest of the opera, continued to be performed sporadically between 1837 and 1839 as a curtain-raiser for ballet productions, and excerpts from the work were played in a concert in 1865. After that it sank into obscurity. However, La Esmeralda was revived in February 2002 when it was staged to piano accompaniment (using the Bertin/Liszt score) at the Théâtre-Opéra in Besançon to mark the 200th anniversary of Hugo's birth. A concert performance using the full orchestral score was given on 23 July 2008 at the Opéra Berlioz in Montpellier as part of the Festival de Radio France et Montpellier and later released on CD.

== Roles ==
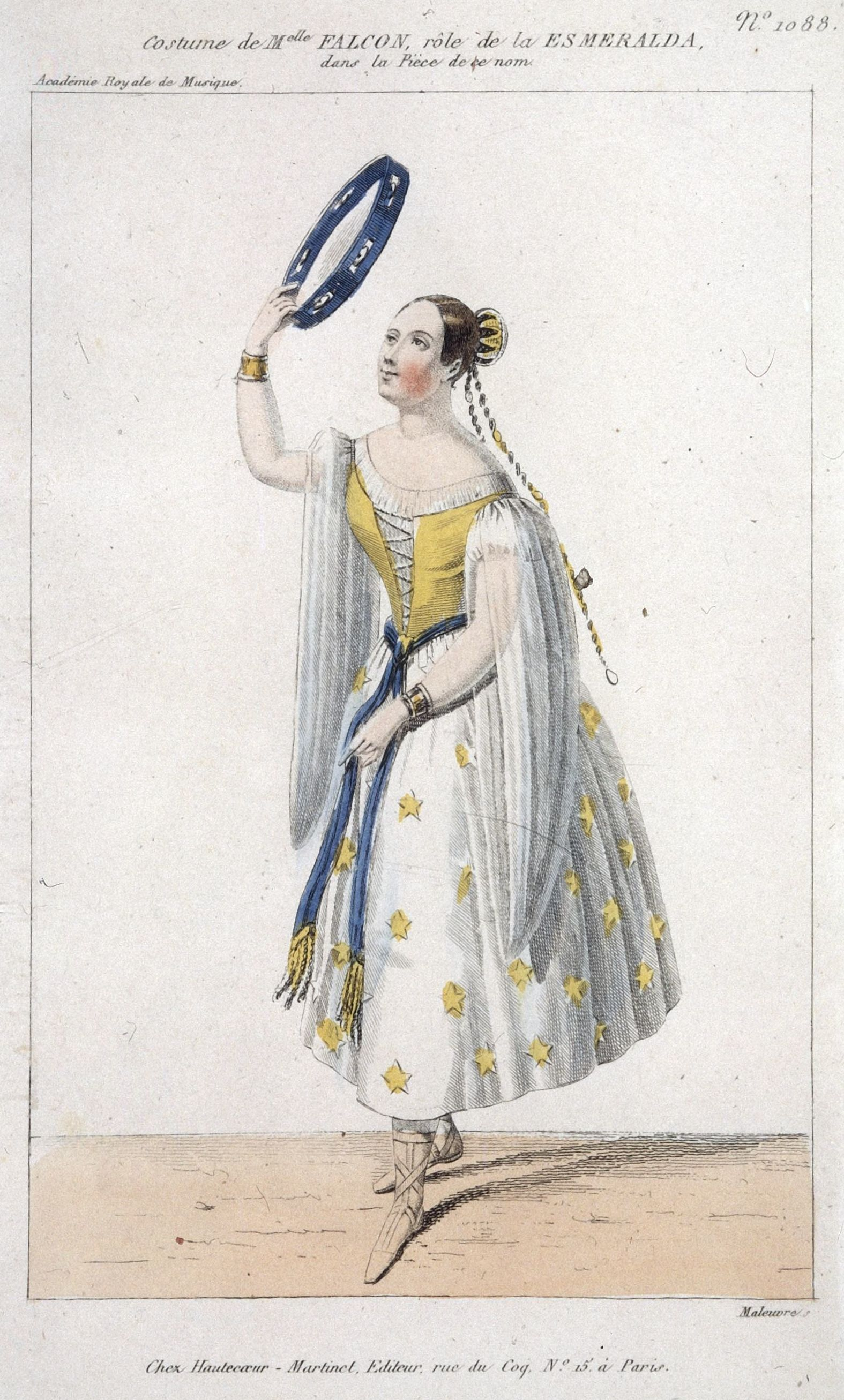
Cornélie Falcon as Esmeralda

Roles, voice types, premiere cast
| Role | Voice type | Premiere cast, 14 November 1836 Conductor: François Habeneck |
|---|---|---|
| Esmeralda, a beautiful gypsy dancer | soprano | Cornélie Falcon |
| Phoebus de Chateaupers, captain of the King's Archers | tenor | Adolphe Nourrit |
| Claude Frollo, Archdeacon of Notre-Dame Cathedral | bass | Nicolas Levasseur |
| Quasimodo, the bell-ringer of Notre-Dame Cathedral | tenor | Jean-Étienne-Auguste Massol |
| Fleur de Lys de Gondelaurier, the wealthy fiancée of Phoebus | soprano | Constance Jawureck |
| Madame Aloise de Gondelaurier, her mother | mezzo-soprano | Augusta Mori-Gosselin |
| Diane | mezzo-soprano | Mme. Lorotte |
| Bérangère | mezzo-soprano | Mme. Laurent |
| Le Vicomte de Gif | tenor | Alexis Dupont |
| Monsieur de Chevreuse | bass | Ferdinand Prévôt |
| Monsieur de Morlaix | bass | Jean-Jacques-Émile Serda |
| Clopin Trouillefou, a street performer and leader of the vagabonds | tenor | François Wartel |
| Le crieur public (town crier) | baritone | Hens |
People, vagabonds, and archers

== Synopsis ==
Setting: Paris, 1482

=== Act 1 ===
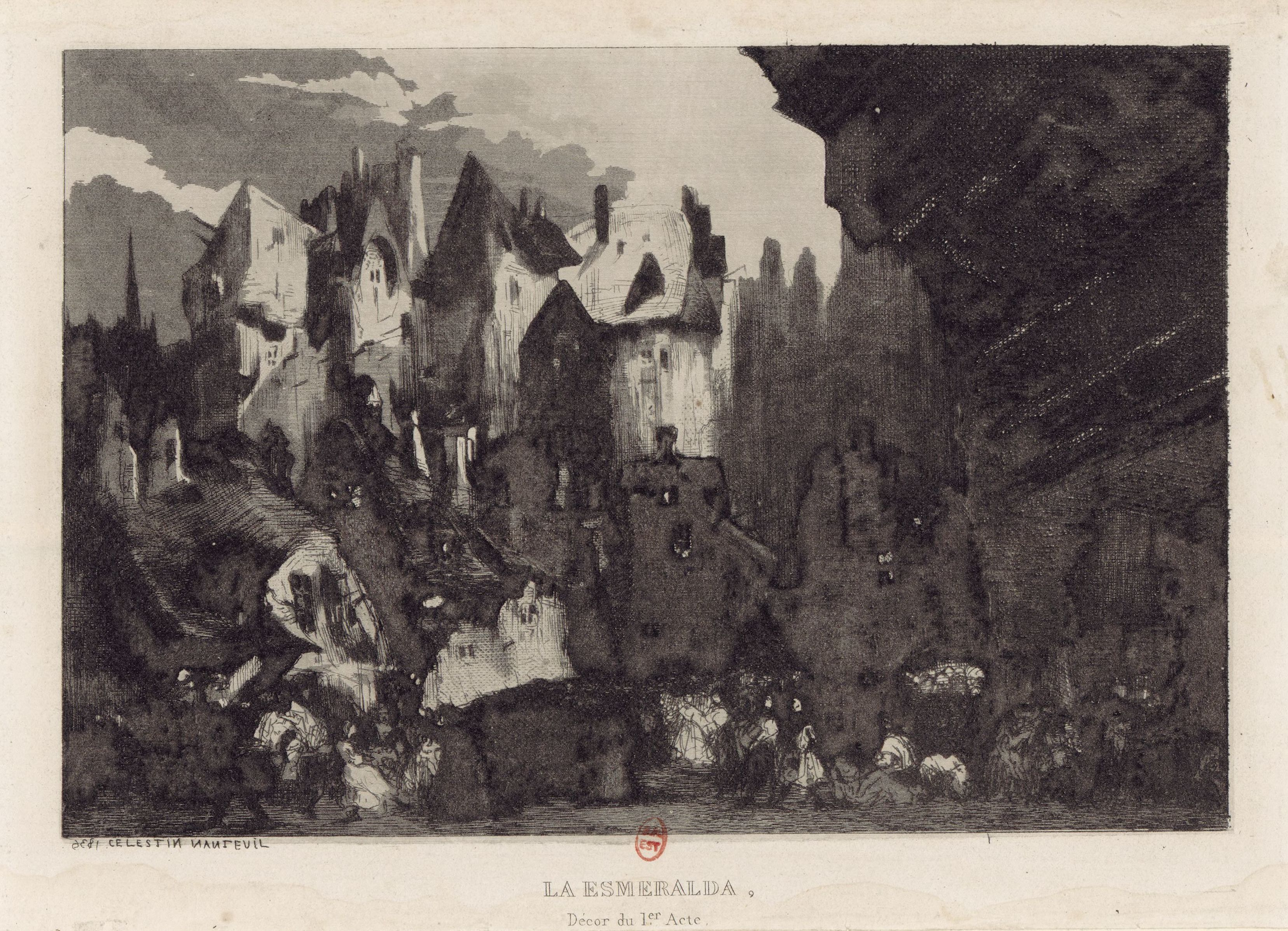
Célestin Nanteuil's engraving of the act 1 set design, after Cambon

The Cour des miracles at night

The beggars and thieves of Paris, led by Clopin, are celebrating carnival season with rowdy songs. Esmeralda entertains them with a gypsy dance. Frollo, the corrupt archdeacon of Notre-Dame Cathedral watches the scene from his hiding place and is consumed with desire for her. Before she finishes her dance, Quasimodo, the deformed bell-ringer at the cathedral is led in to be crowned "The Fools' Pope" When Frollo angrily remonstrates with him, the crowd turns on Frollo who is rescued by Clopin. With Quasimodo's help, Frollo then attempts to kidnap Esmeralda, but she is rescued by the arrival of Phoebus and his archers. Esmeralda and Phoebus are taken with one another and as a parting gift, he gives her a scarf.

=== Act 2 ===
Scene 1: The Place de Grève

The crowd taunts Quasimodo who has been placed in the stocks for his role in the attempted kidnap of Esmeralda. However, she takes pity on him and offers him a drink of water.

Scene 2: A magnificent room in the house of Fleur de Lys de Gondelaurier

A reception is about to begin. Phoebus, who is engaged to Fleur de Lys, reflects on his love for Esmeralda. The guests arrive but are soon drawn to the window to watch Esmeralda who is dancing in the street below. During the course of her dance she waves the scarf which Phoebus had given her. Fleur de Lys is horrified. The scarf had been her present to Phoebus. At this sign of his infidelity, Fleur de Lys and her wealthy guests turn on Phoebus.

=== Act 3 ===
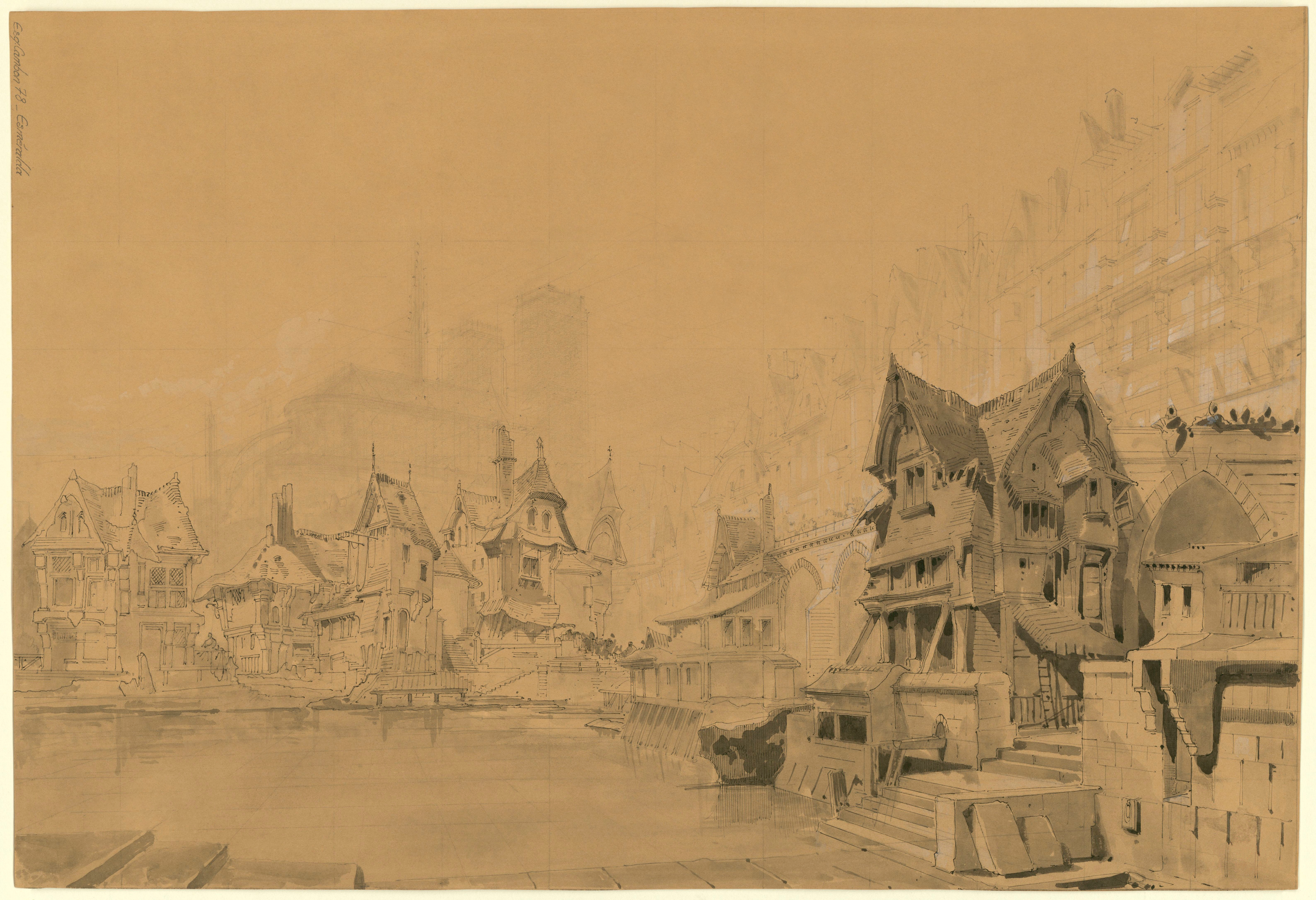
Cambon's design for act 3, scene 1

Scene 1: Outside a tavern

Phoebus and his men are carousing outside the tavern. He sings to them of his new love, Esmeralda, who is to meet him for a tryst at the tavern later that night. Frollo appears and attempting to prevent the tryst warns Phoebus that Esmeralda is a sorceress.

Frollo is hiding in a niche where he can spy on the lovers. In a fit of jealousy, he rushes out and attacks Phoebus with his sword badly wounding him.

=== Act 4 ===
Scene 1: A prison

At the behest of Frollo, Esmeralda has been imprisoned and sentenced to death for the murder of Phoebus, although unbeknownst to her he is still alive. Frollo offers to have her freed if she becomes his lover. Esmeralda angrily refuses.

Scene 2: A square outside Notre-Dame Cathedral

As Quasimodo rings the cathedral bells, Esmeralda prepares herself for the execution. Frollo is now planning to abduct her again, this time with Clopin's help. As the crowd pours into the square to witness the execution, Quasimodo grabs Esmeralda and takes her into the cathedral where she will have sanctuary from the executioner. Attempts are made to remove her, but suddenly the wounded Phoebus arrives. His testimony exonerates her, but he dies in her arms. She throws herself on his body, vowing to follow him. Frollo cries out "Fatalité!", echoed by the chorus of onlookers.

== Recording ==
- Louise Bertin: La Esmeralda – Maya Boog (Esmeralda), Manuel Nuñez Camelino (Phoebus), Francesco Ellero d'Artegna (Frollo), Frédéric Antoun (Quasimodo); Orchestre national de Montpellier and the Chœur de la Radio Lettone, Lawrence Foster (conductor). Live recording of the performance on 23 July 2008 at the Opéra Berlioz, Montpellier. Label: Accord 4802341

== Notes and references ==
=== Sources ===
- Bennett, Douglas M. (February 2002). "Louise-Angélique Bertin, Dilettante or Icon?". Donizetti Society Newsletter. No. 85.
- Bertin, Louise; Hugo, Victor (1836). La Esmeralda: Opéra en quatre actes (libretto). Maurice Schlesinger.
- Cairns, David (2003). Berlioz – Servitude and Greatness, 1832–1869. Vol. 2. University of California Press. ISBN 0-520-24058-8.
- Crory, Neil (September 2009). "Review: La Esmeralda, Louise Bertin, Accord 4802341". Opera Canada. Archived from the original on 6 November 2012 – via HighBeam Research.
- Gerhard, Anselm (2000). The Urbanization of Opera: Music Theater in Paris in the Nineteenth Century. University of Chicago Press. ISBN 0-226-28858-7.
- Halsall, Albert W. (1998). Victor Hugo and the Romantic Drama. University of Toronto Press. ISBN 0-8020-4322-4.
- Hibberd, Sarah (2009). "Monsters and the Mob: Depictions of the Grotesque on the Parisian Stage 1826–1836". In Rachael Langford (ed.). Textual Intersections: Literature, History and the Arts in Nineteenth-century Europe. Rodopi. pp. 20–40. ISBN 978-90-420-2731-2.
- Hugo, Adèle (1863). Victor Hugo. Translated by Charles Edwin Wilbour. Carleton.
- Hugo, Victor (1964). J.-J. Thierry; Josette Mélèze (eds.). Théatre complet. Paris: Editions Gallmard (2 vols).
- Kutsch, K. J.; Riemens, Leo (2003). Großes Sängerlexikon (in German) (4th ed.). Munich: K. G. Saur. ISBN 978-3-598-11598-1.
