= Louis-Désiré Véron =

French publisher and opera director (1798–1867)

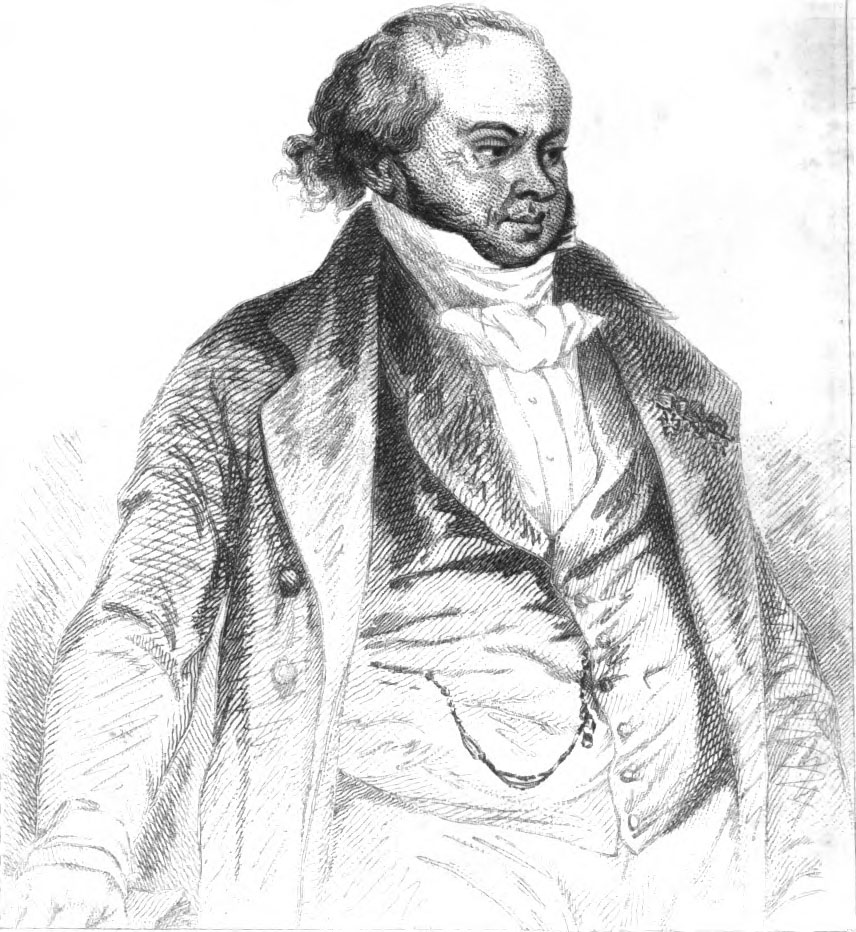
Louis Véron

Louis-Désiré Véron (1798 in Paris – September 27, 1867 in Paris) was a French opera manager and publisher.

== Biography ==
Véron originally made his fortune from patent medicines. In 1829 he founded the literary magazine Revue de Paris, and from 1838 to 1852 was owner and director of Le Constitutionnel, in which he published Eugene Sue's novel based on the legend of the Wandering Jew. It was also during Véron's direction and at his suggestion that Sainte-Beuve contributed the Causeries du lundi, an early example of the regular newspaper column.

He is largely known to history for his direction, from 1831-1835, of the Paris Opera. The new government, after the July Revolution of 1830, wished to offload the costs and responsibilities of the Opera, which had been effectively state-controlled since its inception. Véron saw the great potential of adapting the Opera to the bourgeois tastes of new audiences and applied for the franchise, which brought with it limited State subsidy. By bringing together the talents of designers (such as Duponchel), composers (such as Meyerbeer, Auber and Fromental Halévy), and librettists (such as Eugène Scribe and Casimir Delavigne), and developing great singers such as Adolphe Nourrit and Cornélie Falcon, he created the genre of Grand Opera. The first new production under Véron's management, Meyerbeer's Robert le diable (21 November 1831) began a new era in opera. When the government decided to further reduce subsidy of the Opera in 1835, Véron prudently withdrew, having made a substantial profit.

In 1852 Véron was elected to the Corps Législatif (the predecessor of the Chamber of Deputies). His Memoires d'un bourgeois de Paris (1853–1855) give a lively picture of his life and times.

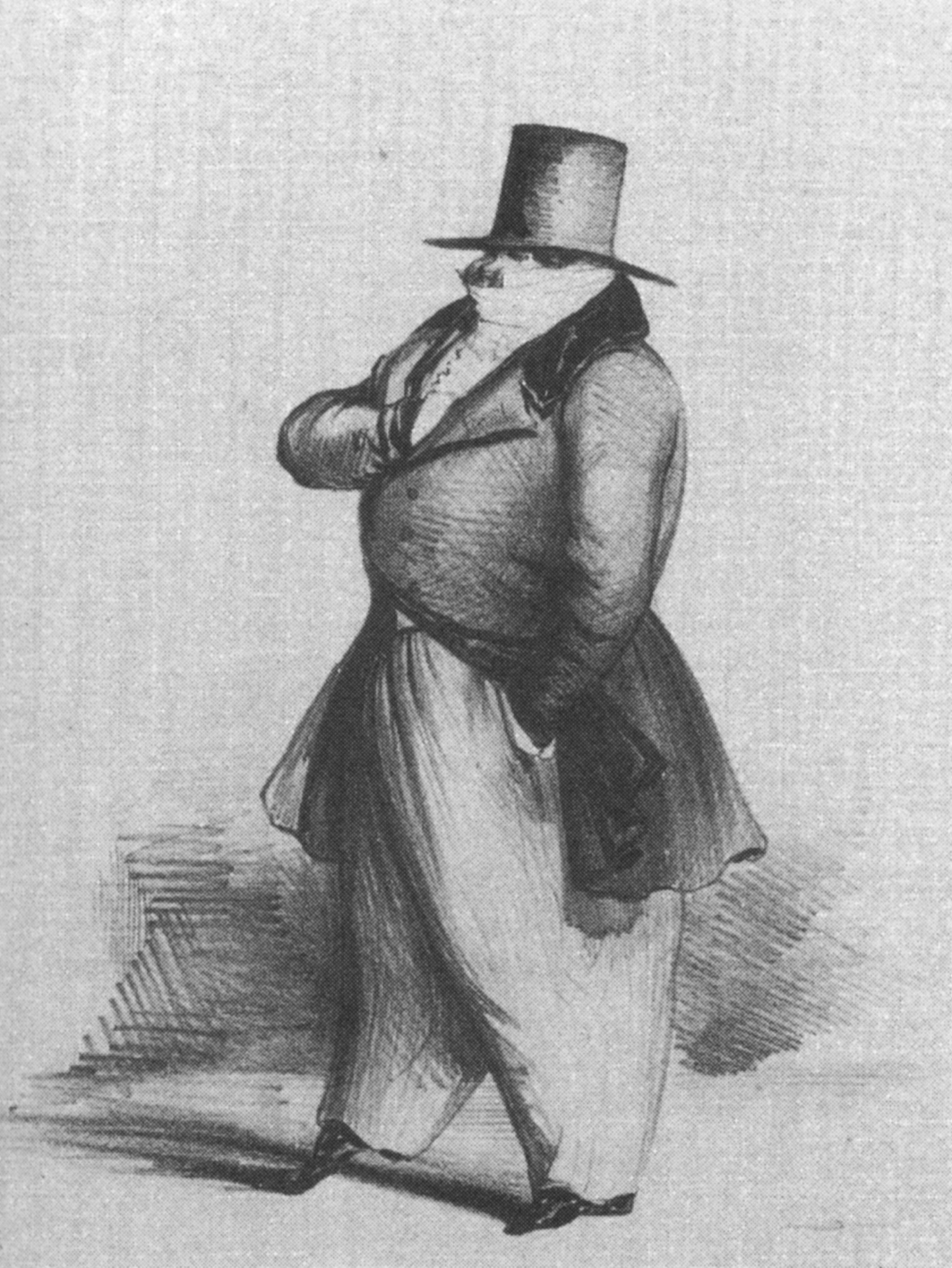
Sketch of Louis Véron

Véron was eccentric in his appearance and behaviour. A contemporary, Philarete Chasles, describes him as follows:

Ruddy, with a pock-marked face, barely any nose, scrofulous, his neck enfolded in cloth that protected and hid his affliction, pot-bellied; [...] mouth smiling, lips thick, hair rare, eyebrows absent, dressed like a little lackey aping his master and with the affectations and the mincing airs of the salon (quoted in Kelly, 2004 – see below).

== Bibliography ==
- Véron, Louis Désiré. Mémoires d'un Bourgeois de Paris, 5 Vol. in French (ISBN 0543990567, ISBN ?, ISBN 1-4212-4316-4, ISBN 0-543-99050-8, ISBN 0-543-99048-6)
- Véron, Louis Désiré. L'Opéra de Paris. (ISBN 2876230089)
