= Stradella (Niedermeyer) =

Opera by Louis Niedermeyer

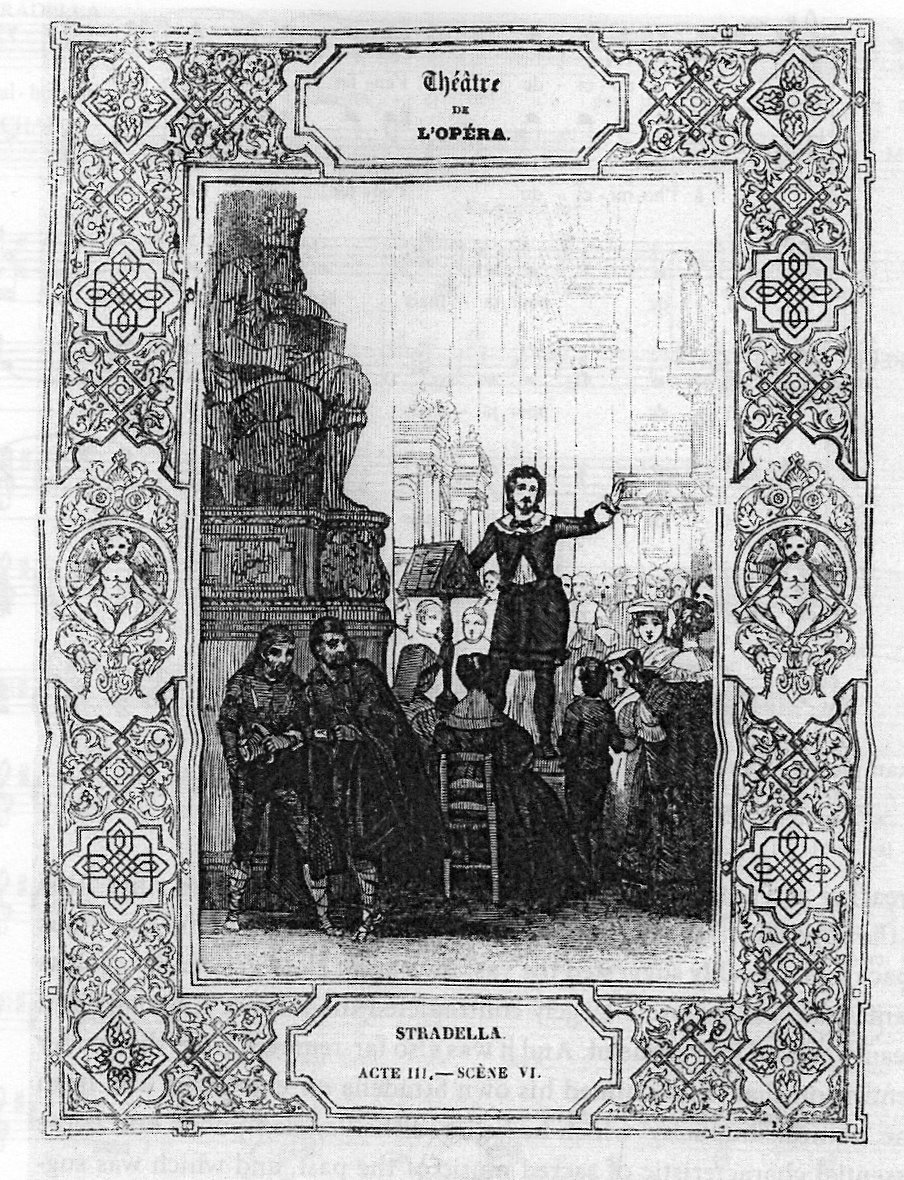
Stradella chants his hymn 'Pleure, Jérusalem', in Act III of the opera. Artist unknown

Stradella is a Grand Opera in five acts by Louis Niedermeyer to a libretto by Emile Deschamps and Émilien Pacini. Based on a highly romanticized version of the life of the composer Alessandro Stradella (1639–1682), it was premiered at the Paris Opera on 3 March 1837.

== Background ==
The storyline of the opera is fashioned from the fanciful legend told by Pierre Bourdelot in his 1715 Histoire de la musique. Interest in Stradella in Paris had been growing in 1830s Paris, after the musician François-Joseph Fétis had included an aria, (supposedly by Stradella but actually by Fétis himself), in an 1833 concert; the melody soon became extremely popular. In July 1836 the Revue et gazette musicale, run by Maurice Schlesinger, had serialised a work by Jules Janin, Stradella, or the Poet and the Musician, as 'advance publicity' (Schlesinger was to publish Niedermeyer's score in 1837). Moreover, a vaudeville with music by Flotow on the same subject opened in Paris a month before Niedermeyer's opera.

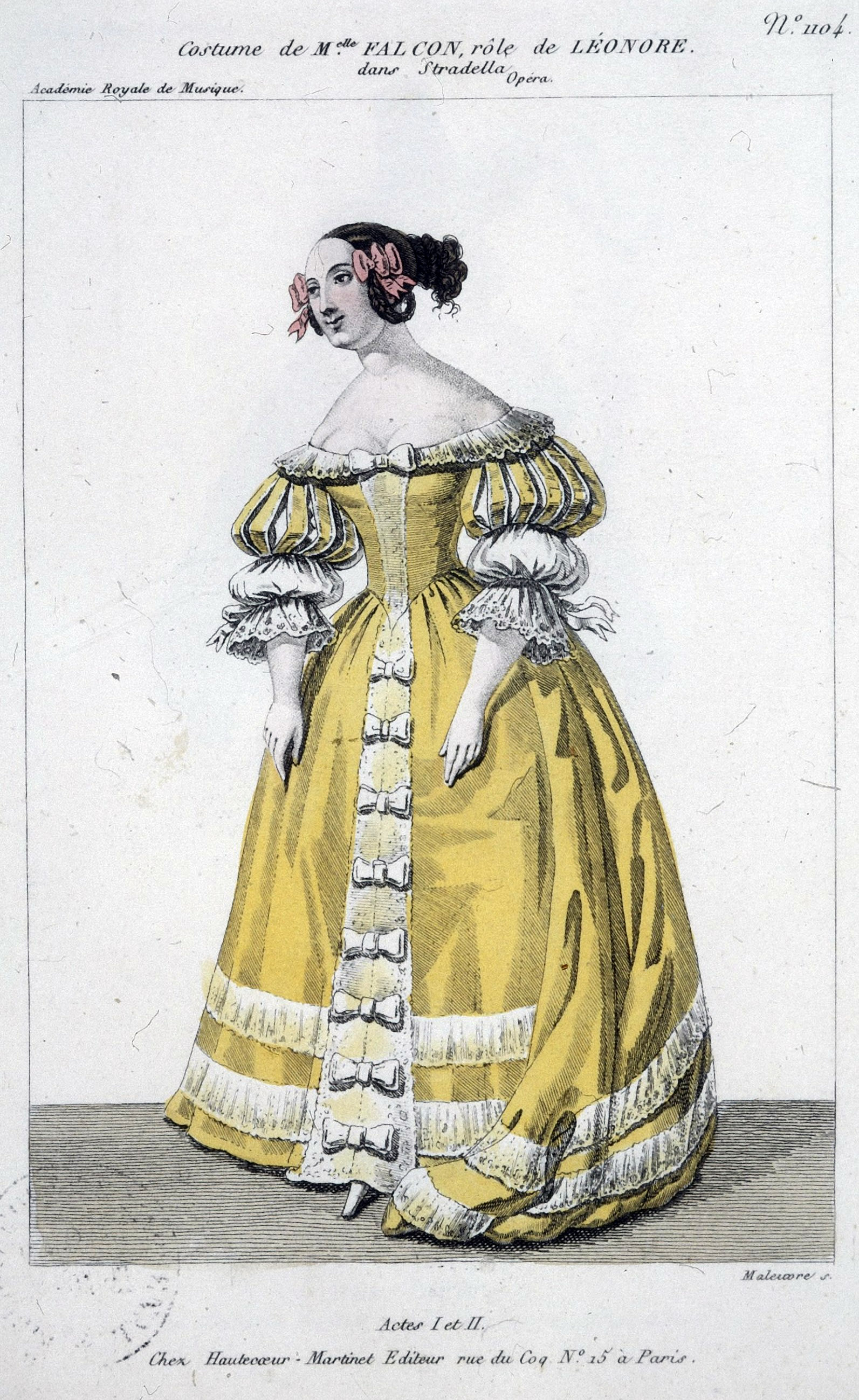
Costume design for Cornélie Falcon in Acts I and II

The opera was Niedermeyer's first venture in the Grand Opera vein. The leading roles were taken by two of the Opera's strongest singers, Adolphe Nourrit and Cornélie Falcon, both then at the height of their careers. However, for both of them it represented some of their last appearances in Paris singing full operatic roles.

Falcon lost her voice catastrophically during the second performance of Stradella at the Opéra in March 1837. When Nourrit as Stradella asked her "Demain nous partirons – voulez-vous?", Falcon was unable to sing her line "Je suis prête", fainted, and was carried offstage by Nourrit. Hector Berlioz, who was present, describes "raucous sounds like those of a child with croup, guttural, whistling notes that quickly faded like those of a flute filled with water". Her career never recovered from this disaster, and after 1840 she never performed publicly again. Nourrit gave a farewell performance in April 1837 after the first performances of Stradella, and later that year travelled to Italy, where he committed suicide in 1839.

The opera had a mixed reception. In a letter Berlioz was more frank than he would be in a review, saying: "In a few days' time I have to find a way of writing indulgent nonsense about an appalling non-work called Stradella, of which I saw a rehearsal yesterday evening at the Opéra. A thousand reasons force me to, quite apart from the fact that it would not be decent, in my position, to slate a young composer [Niedermeyer] who has for a long time been in the same situation vis-à-vis the theatre as I am. But I must warn you not to believe a word I say." The opera was revised to suit Gilbert Duprez when he took over the title role from Nourrit in 1837, and successfully revived in a three-act form in 1840. It is now almost totally forgotten.

== Roles ==
Role	Voice type	Premiere Cast, 3 March 1837	Premiere Cast (3-act version), September 1840
Alessandro Stradella, maestro and singer	tenor	Adolphe Nourrit	Marié
Léonor, young orphan, fiancée of Stradella	soprano	Cornélie Falcon	Rosine Stoltz
Ginevra, mother of Beppo		Gosselin	—
Duke of Pesaro, patrician and senator	bass	Prosper Dérivis	Adolphe Alizard
Spadoni, servant of the Duke	bass	Nicolas Levasseur	Nicolas Levasseur
Beppo, student and friend of Stradella	baritone	Ferdinand Prévôt	Mme Widemann
Piétro, a hired assassin	tenor	François Wartel	François Wartel
Michael, a hired assassin	baritone	Jean-Étienne-Auguste Massol	Jean-Étienne-Auguste Massol
An officer		Charpentier	Ferdinand Prévôt
Chorus: citizens, pilgrims, strolling players, etc.

== Synopsis ==
The opera takes place in Venice and Rome, about 1660.

In Act I, in Venice, Stradella shields Léonor who is pursued by the Duke of Pesaro. They plan to flee together but the Duke recaptures Léonor. In Act II Stradella rescues Léonor from the Duke by threatening him with a pistol. Act III takes place in Rome during Holy Week, where Stradella is to sing during the celebrations amongst the pilgrims. Léonor rejects an offer of marriage from the Duke, conveyed by Spadoni, who secures two assassins to murder Stradella, but Stradella's singing of his hymn ('Pleure, Jérusalem') in the church of Santa Mara Maggiore so moves them that they drop their daggers and flee. In Act IV, preparing to be crowned with laurel for his singing and to marry Léonor, Stradella is captured by the Duke and conveyed again to Venice. In Act V, the Duke becomes Doge of Venice, and condemns Stradella to execution. However he is forced to relent by the pleas of Léonor and of the people.
