= Thorington Players =

Amateur orchestra in London

The Thorington Players are an amateur orchestra based in London. The orchestra gives frequent concerts for charity. It is conducted by David Cairns.

It has often played at St. John's, Smith Square, in the chapel of Merton College, Oxford and at the Suffolk festival Summer on the Peninsula, but its main base is St. Mary's Church, Putney (the scene of the Putney Debates in 1647).

The orchestra was founded in 1983 by David Cairns with the help of friends, after week-ends of chamber music at Thorington Hall in Suffolk.

Soloists who have performed with the orchestra include: Gina McCormack, Tasmin Little, Steven Isserlis, Garrick Ohlsson, Ian Lake, Peter Cropper, Stephen Kovacevich, Tamas Vesmas, Grace Francis, Lionel Friend, Sophia Rahman, Martin Neary, Jane Hyland, Alice Neary, Jill Gomez, Mark Tatlow, Robin Ticciati, Luciano Iorio, James Mcleod, Jorja Fleezanis, Katherine Hunka, Alison Buchanan, Phyllis Cannan, Robert Tear, John Graham-Hall, Thomas Helmsley, Catrin Johnsson, Milana Zaric, Audrey Hylad, Hilary Dolamore, Jessica Walker, David Murphy, Richard Ireland and David Wilson Johnson.
