= Charles-Antoine Cambon =

French painter

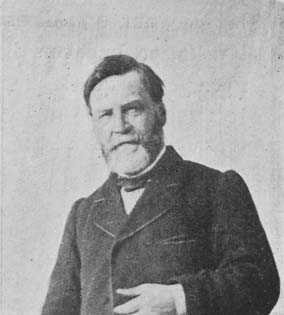
- Undated photograph of Cambon by Bernier
- Born: 21 April 1802; Paris, France
- Died: 22 October 1875 (aged 73); Paris, France
- Education: Pierre-Luc-Charles Ciceri
- Known for: scenographer
- Style: Romanticism
- Awards: Chevalier de la Légion d'honneur

Charles-Antoine Cambon (French pronunciation: [ʃaʁl ɑ̃twan kɑ̃bɔ̃]; 21 April 1802 – 22 October 1875) was a French scenographer, theatrical production designer, who acquired international renown in the Romantic Era.

== Career ==
Little biographical information exists on Cambon's early years, other than that he would have been active as an aquarelle and sepia artist before studying with Pierre-Luc Charles Ciceri. At Ciceri's workshop Cambon made acquaintance with Humanité-René Philastre, who would become his first long-term associate.

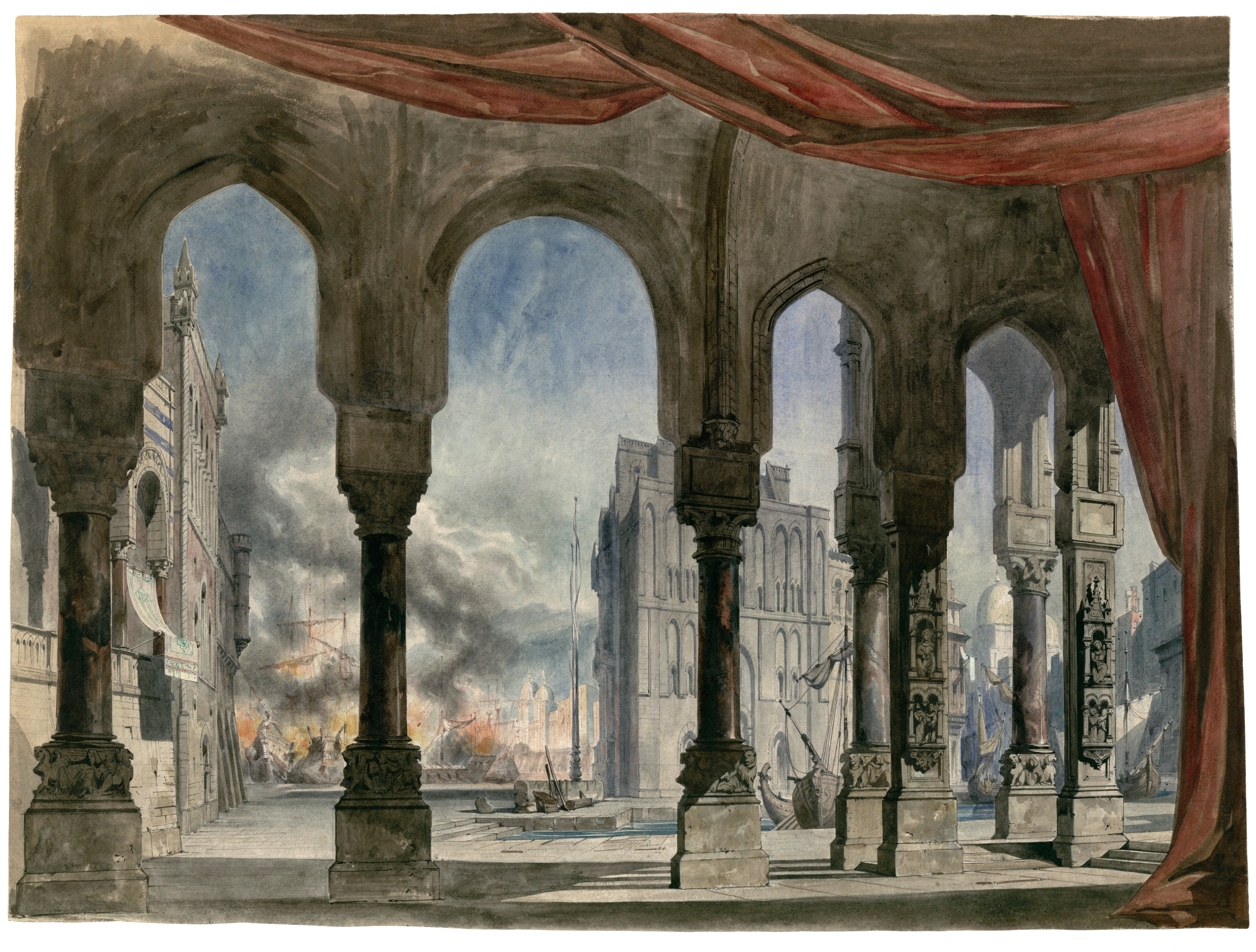
Set design for Act V, Scene 2 of La reine de Chypre (1841)

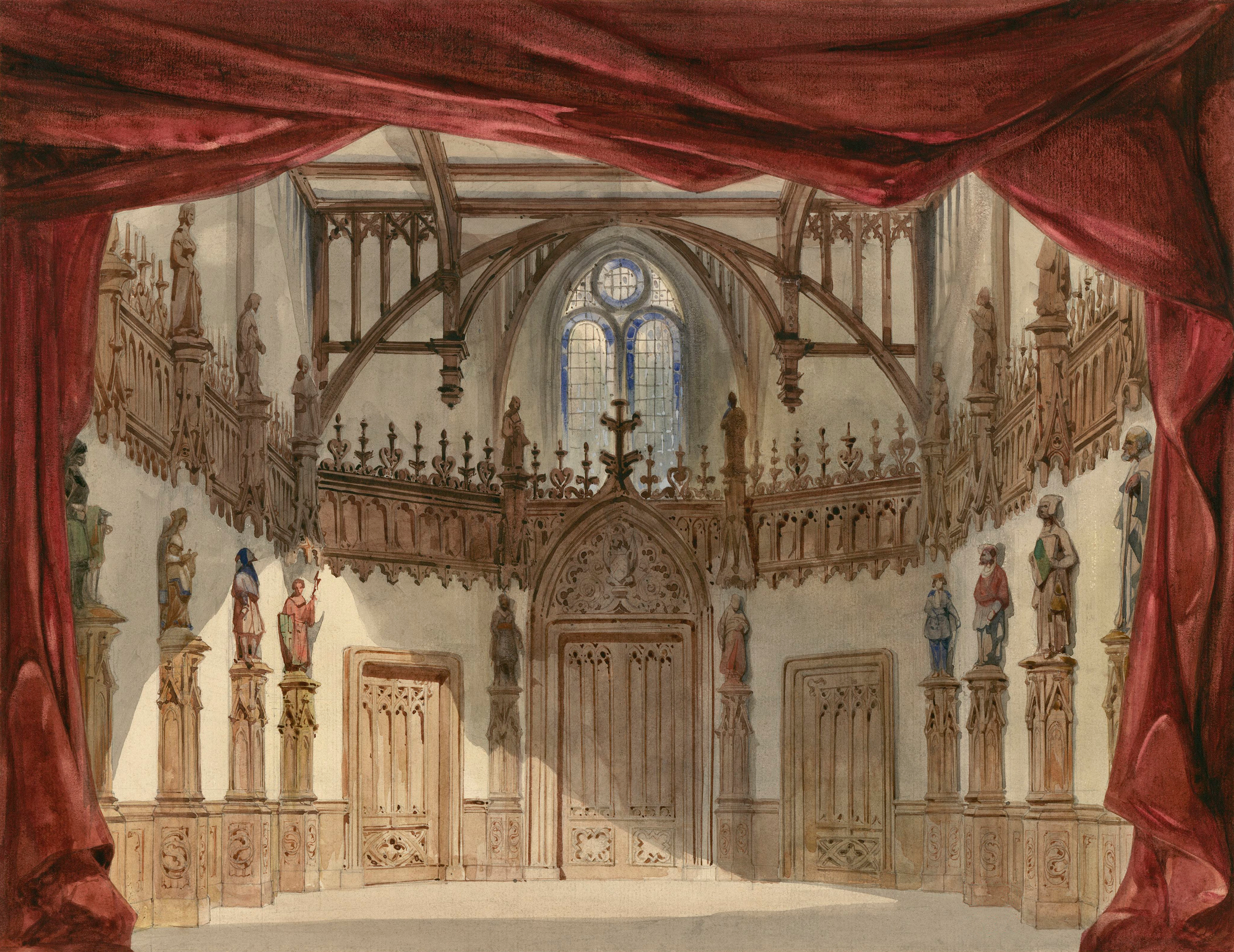
Collaboration with Humanité René Philastre for Les Burgraves, Act II (première production, 1843)

As a stage design for a "Salon" at the Bibliothèque-Musée de l'Opéra testifies, Philastre and Cambon started collaborating in 1824 at the latest. From that time until 1848, Philastre and Cambon accepted numerous joint commissions for theatrical interior decorations and stage designs. Thus, they decorated the interiors of venues in Angoulême, Antwerp, Beaune, Brest, Choiseul, Dijon, Douai, Ghent, Lille, Lyon, Paris and Rouen, often providing complete machineries as well. Philastre and Cambon also designed productions – or portions thereof, as was customary back then – for Paris (Académie Royale de Musique, Ambigu, Bouffes-Parisiens, Cirque Olympique, Comédie-Française, Délassements-Comiques, Folies-Dramatiques, Porte Saint-Martin), Antwerp (Théâtre Royal Français), Barcelona (Liceu) and Ghent (Grand Théâtre) that created the blueprint for grand opéra and romantic scenography in Europe. Notable stagings to which Philastre and Cambon contributed are the world premieres of Auber's Gustave III, ou Le bal masque (1833), Berlioz' Benvenuto Cellini (1838), Donizetti's La favorite (1840), Halévy's La juive (1835), and Hugo's Les Burgraves (1843).

Cambon separated from Philastre in 1848 as the latter emigrated to Spain. He found a new associate in an extremely talented student, Joseph Thierry, with whom Cambon would design epoch-making productions for the Châtelet, Opéra, Opéra-Comique, Théâtre-Historique, and Théâtre-Lyrique in Paris. Examples of Cambon and Thierry's joint oeuvre include the world premieres of Berlioz' Les Troyens à Carthage (1863), Gounod's Faust (1859) and La reine de Saba (1862), Meyerbeer's Le prophète (1849) and L'Africaine (1865), Verdi's Jérusalem (1847) and Don Carlos (1867), and Wagner's Tannhäuser (Parisian version, 1861).

After Thierry's premature death, in 1866, Cambon continued to work in full independence for venues in Cairo (Khedivial Opera) and Paris (Odéon, Opéra and Vaudeville), decorating a.o. the world premieres of Delibes' Coppélia (1870) and of Thomas' Hamlet (1868), next to a large number of the Palais Garnier's first-generation productions (a.o. Don Giovanni, Faust, La favorite, Guillaume Tell, Hamlet, Les Huguenots, Jeanne d'Arc and La juive). Cambon was to co-design the premiere of Verdi's Aida (1871), but dropped out of the production due to unknown circumstances.

Cambon taught many pupils at his scenic studio at 3 rue Neuve-Samson (currently rue Léon-Jouhaux, X^{me} Arrondissement). Students of note are Antoine Lavastre and Eugène Louis Carpezat (his official successors), Chéret, Jean-Émile Daran, Célestin-François-Louis Gosse, Eugène Lacoste, Jules-Frédéric Le Goff, Francesc Soler Rovirosa, and Angelo II Quaglio.

Cambon was named Chevalier de la Légion d'honneur in 1869. He was a friend of Prosper Mérimée and Stendhal. Cambon's funeral service at Saint-Denis-du-Sacrement and subsequent burial at Montmartre Cemetery were reportedly attended by Camille du Locle, Émile Perrin and Édouard Thierry, as well as by the complete crew of the Opéra.

== Style ==
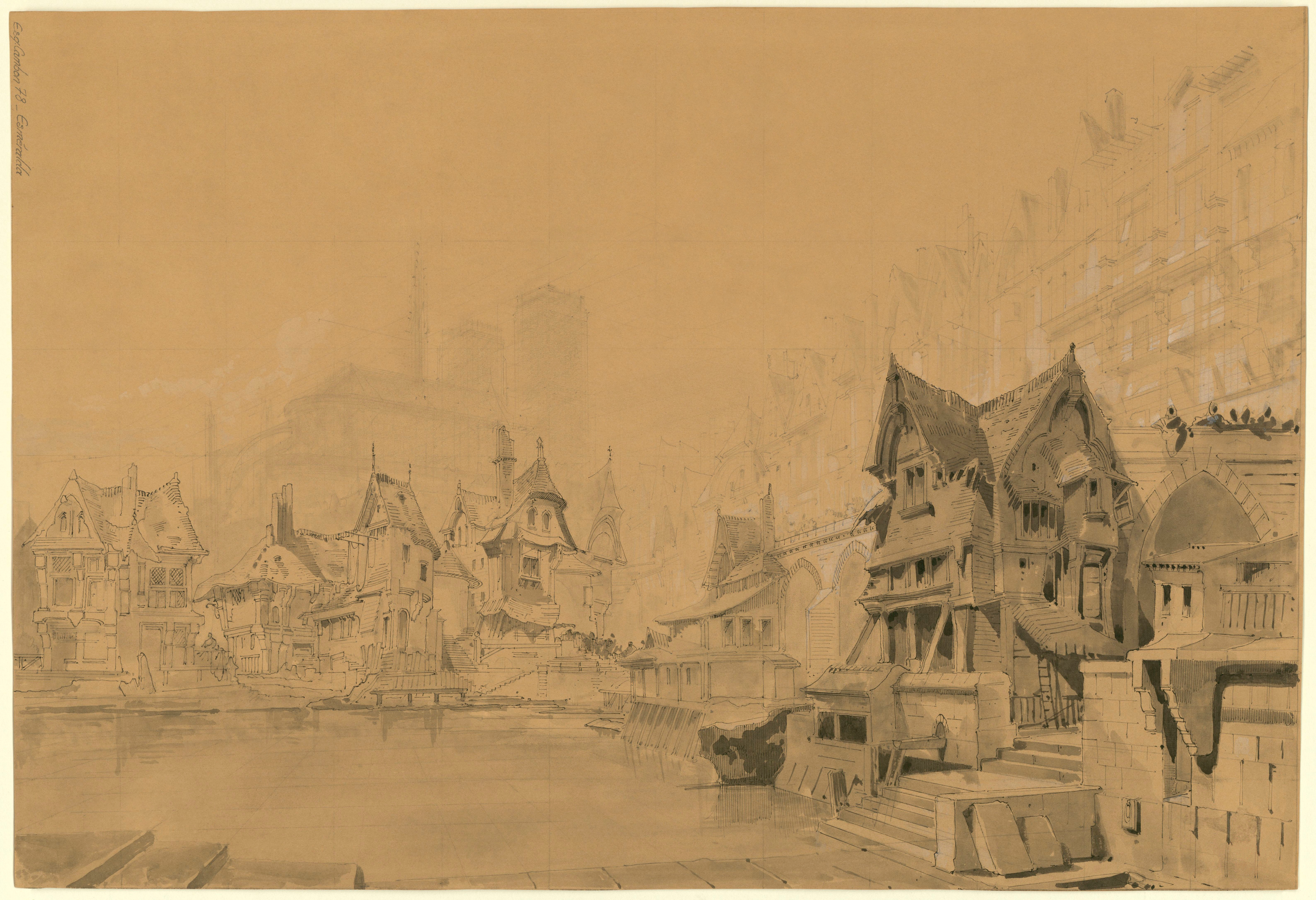
La Esmeralda, Act III, Scene 1

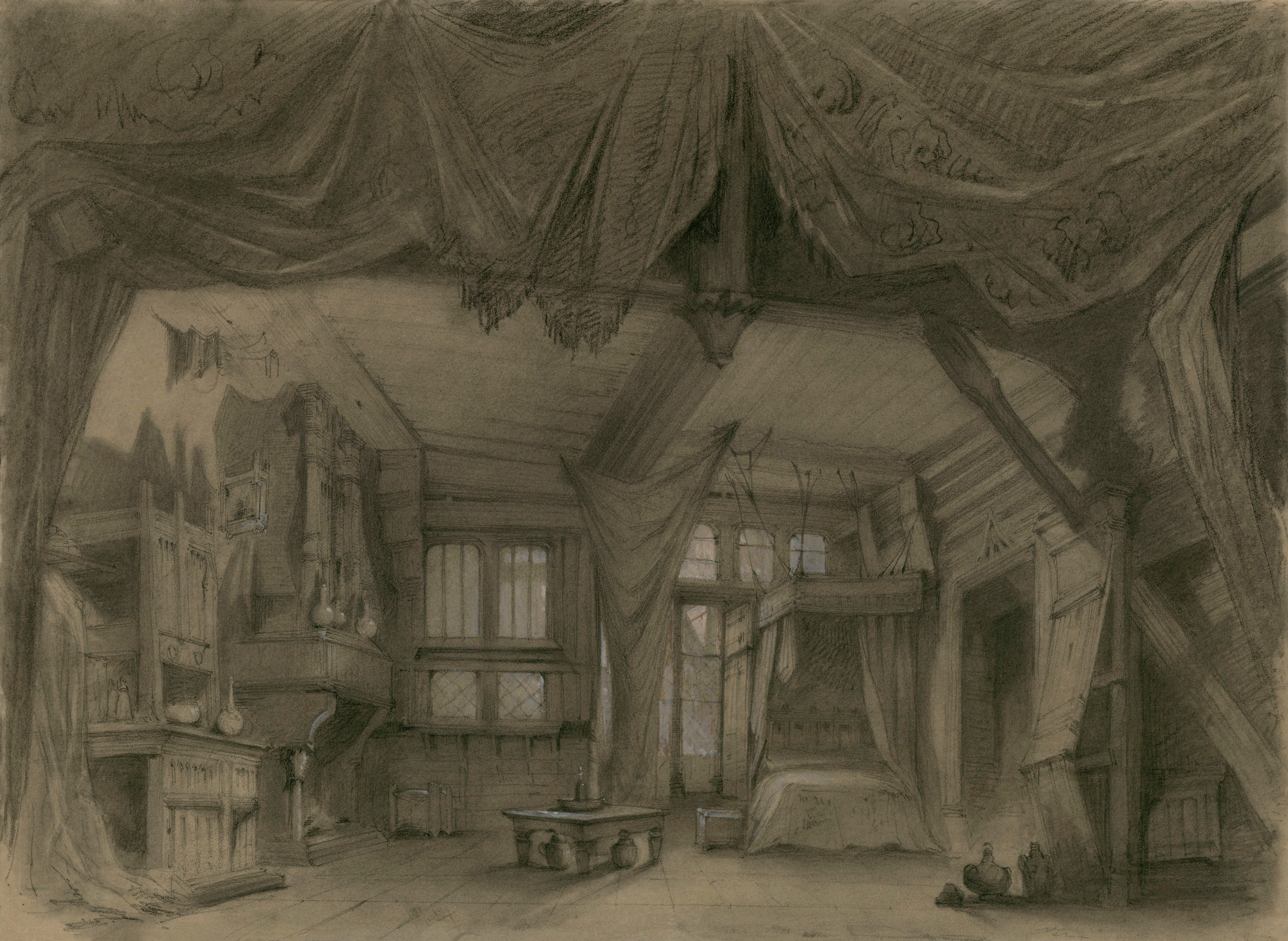
La Esmeralda, Act III, Scene 2

Although Cambon, like most contemporary scenographers, created scenery of various types and styles during his long career, it was in architectural settings that he achieved he is most well known for. In keeping with the romantic need for couleur locale and couleur historique, Cambon aimed at the illusionistic rendering of architectural space, the character and atmosphere of which he enhanced through the use of dramatic points of view and clair-obscur. Cambon's designs and scale-models in Conté crayon, sepia or pastel furthermore reveal his skill as a draughtsman. Though lacking the rich palette of most contemporaries and successors, Cambon's interiors and exteriors are characterized by precise, delicate lines that belie a solid sense of architectural composition and knowledge of each play or opera's spatial needs.

== Preserved works ==
On 17 May 1877, 2,000 designs by Cambon were sold by his widow at the Hôtel Drouot in Paris. Two hundred of these were acquired by the Bibliothèque-Musée de l'Opéra, which would also preserve Cambon's maquettes for the Académie Royale de Musique from 1866 onwards. A number of scale-models predating 1866 have also been preserved. Other stage designs by Cambon are held at the Archives of the Comédie-Française.

Authentic, large-scale artifacts of Cambon's activity survive at

- the Bourla Theatre of Antwerp (B): five levels of authentic stage machineries and foyer decorations designed and executed by Philastre and Cambon in 1834. Notwithstanding being protected, the machinery might still disappear in the near future due to the need of modernization by the venue's current user, Het Toneelhuis—it was listed by Europa Nostra among the 7 Most Endangered sites of 2014.
- the Grand Théâtre of Ghent (B): interior decorations by Philastre and Cambon from 1841.
- the Théâtre of Montbéliard (F): ceiling painted by Cambon and Thierry in 1857. The forms part of the Hôtel de Ville complex.
- the Château des Princes in Chimay (B): interior decorations and act curtain designed by Cambon between 1860 and 1863. The curtain was altered in modern times into a backdrop with newly added flats to create a 'garden' set.

== Bibliography ==
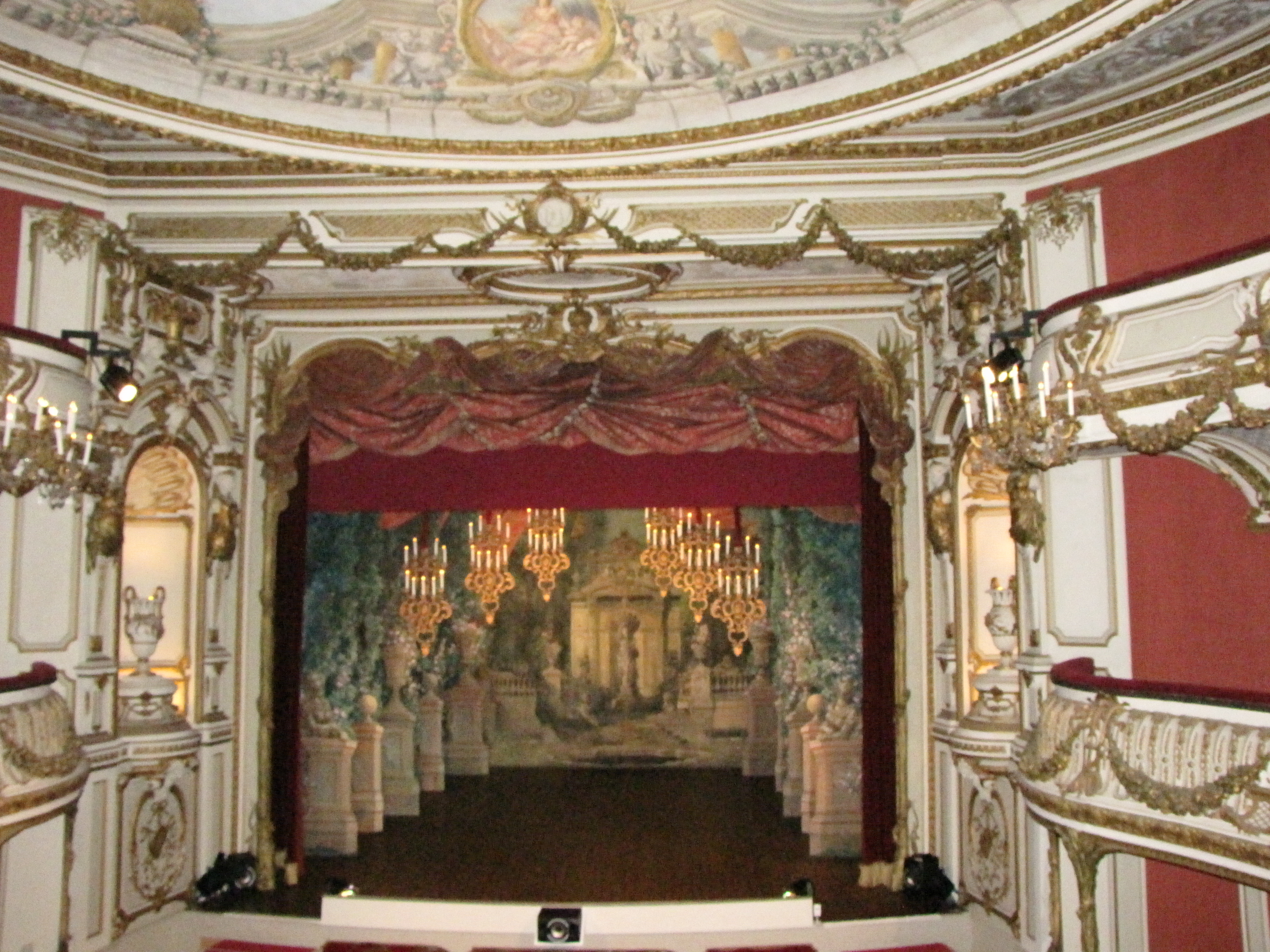
Chimay's Théâtre du Château has the only authentic scenery painted by Cambon: a backdrop from 1860–3.

- Marie-Antoinette Allevy, La mise-en-scène en France dans la première moitié du dix-neuvième siècle (Paris: Droz, 1938).
- Germain Bapst, Essai sur l’histoire du théâtre: la mise en scène, le décor, le costume, l'architecture, l'éclairage, l'hygiène (Paris: Hachette, 1893).
- Peter Beudert, 'Stage Painters at the Paris Opéra in the Nineteenth Century', Music in Art: International Journal for Music Iconography 31/1–2 (2006), 63–72: 64–65.
- Sylvie Chevalley, 'L'atelier Philastre et Cambon et la Comédie-Française', in Anatomy of an illusion: studies in nineteenth-century scene design (Amsterdam: Scheltema & Holkema, 1969), 13–18.
- Pierre De Clercq, 'Humanité-René Philastre (1794–1848) en Charles-Antoine Cambon (1802–1875): decorateurs van theatergebouwen', in De Opera van Gent: het 'Grand Théâtre' van Roelandt, Philastre en Cambon. Architectuur-interieurs-restauratie, ed. Luc Demeester and Birgit Waeterloos (Tielt: Lannoo, 1993), 51–68.
- Nicole Decugis and Suzanne Reymond, Le décor de théâtre en France du Moyen Age à 1925 (Paris: Compagnie française des arts graphiques, 1953).
- Bruno Forment, 'Staging Verdi in the Provinces: The Aida Scenery of Albert Dubosq', in Staging Verdi and Wagner, ed. Naomi Matsumoto (Turnhout: Brepols, 2015), 263–286: 266.
- Catherine Join-Diéterle, Les décors de scène de l’Opéra de Paris à l'époque romantique (Paris: Picard, 1988).
- Catherine Join-Diéterle et al., L'envers du décor à la Comédie-Française et à l'Opéra de Paris au XIXe siècle (Montreuil: Gourcuff Gradenigo, 2012).
- Eugène-Oscar Lami, ed., Dictionnaire encyclopédique et biographique de l’industrie et des arts industriels (Paris: Librairies des dictionnaires, 1881–91), II, 109.
- Jerome Maeckelbergh, 'The "Bourla" in Antwerp: Machinery from 1834 on the Brink of Dismantling?', in Theatrical Heritage: Challenges and Opportunities, ed. Bruno Forment and Christel Stalpaert (Leuven: Leuven University Press, 2015), 149–164.
- Princesse de Chimay, 'Le théâtre de Chimay', in Actes du colloque international « Théâtres de cour – théâtres privés » organisé les 18 et 19 octobre 1996 au musée national du château de Compiègne, ed. Jacques Kuhnmunch (Paris: Éditions du Mécène, 1998), 62–65.
- Madeleine Manderyck, 'De bouwgeschiedenis van het Théâtre Royal Français', in De Bourla Schouwburg: een tempel voor de muzen, ed. Madeleine Manderyck and et al. (Tielt: Lannoo, 1993), 41–75.
- M. V., 'Ch.-Antoine Cambon', Le monde illustré 19/968 (1875), 278.
- Nicole Wild, Décors et costumes du XIXe siècle. Tome II: théâtres et décorateurs (Paris: Bibliothèque nationale de France-Département de la Musique, 1993), 286–291 et passim.
- Nicole Wild, 'De decors van Philastre en Cambon', in De Opera van Gent, 68–75.5.
