= Revue de Paris =

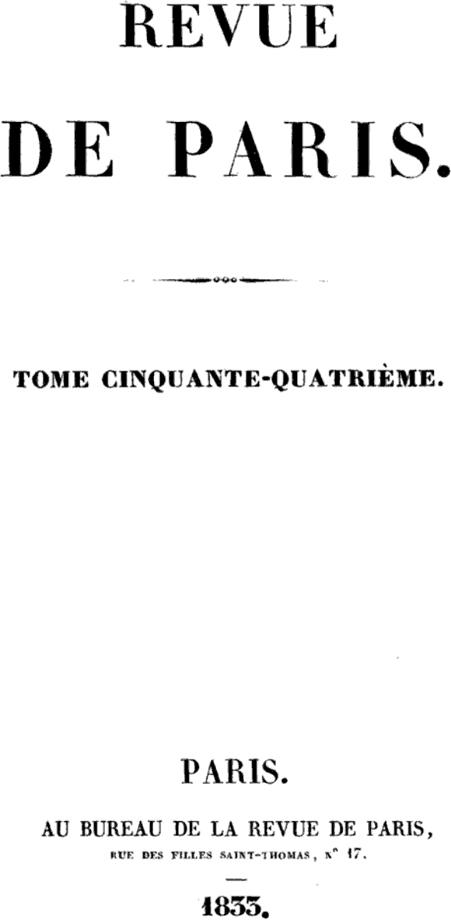

Revue de Paris was a French literary magazine founded in 1829 by Louis-Désiré Véron. After two years Véron left the magazine to head the Paris Opera.

The magazine ceased to be published in 1970.
