= Stephen Gray (musical administrator) =

Philip Stephen Gray
- Born: 11 March 1923; Guildford, Surrey, England
- Died: 30 November 2012 (aged 89)
- Occupation: Musical administrator

Philip Stephen Gray OBE (11 March 1923 – 30 November 2012) was an English musical administrator, who managed the Royal Liverpool Philharmonic Orchestra for 23 years.

== Career ==
In 1950, together with David Cairns, Gray established the Chelsea Opera Group. This was an organisation that produced concert performances of operas rather than staged productions because they were less expensive for the audiences. For their first performance they persuaded Colin Davis, at the time a 22-year-old clarinetist, to conduct a concert performance of Mozart’s Don Giovanni in the Holywell Music Room, Oxford. Gray played in the orchestra, and Cairns sang the role of Leporello.

In 1957 the London Philharmonic Orchestra invited Gray to leave his career at the Bank of England to assist with managing its finances. Two years later Gray joined the Philharmonia Orchestra as an administrator. In 1964 he moved to Liverpool to become the manager of the Liverpool Philharmonic Orchestra, a post he held until his retirement in 1987. During this time, the orchestra had five principal conductors, Sir Charles Groves (until 1977), Walter Weller (1977–80), David Atherton (1980–83), Marek Janowski (1983–87), and Libor Pešek (1987–97). Together with Sir Charles, Gray organised an annual conductors' seminar, in which young potential conductors worked with the orchestra for a fortnight. In 1972 Gray noticed the potential of Simon Rattle when, at the age of 17, he conducted the Merseyside Youth Orchestra in a performance of The Rite of Spring. Gray appointed Rattle as an associate conductor of the Royal Liverpool Philharmonic Orchestra in 1977. When Gray retired in 1987, a concert was organised in which each of the five principal conductors, and Simon Rattle, took part. Following his retirement, Gray remained active, helping to the rescue the Bluecoat Society of Arts, who were based in the Bluecoat Chambers in Liverpool, from closure.

== Personal life ==
Stephen Gray was born in Guildford, Surrey, England, and was the son of an Anglican clergyman. He was educated at Rugby School, where he took an active part in the school orchestra. After leaving school he worked at Bletchley Park, but he never disclosed what he did there. He studied classics at Trinity College, Oxford, then joined the Bank of England as a trainee. Gray married Frances, a member of the chorus of the Chelsea Opera Group, in 1953. Together they had a son and a daughter. Gray was appointed OBE in 1987.
