= Jean-Étienne-Auguste Massol =

French opera singer

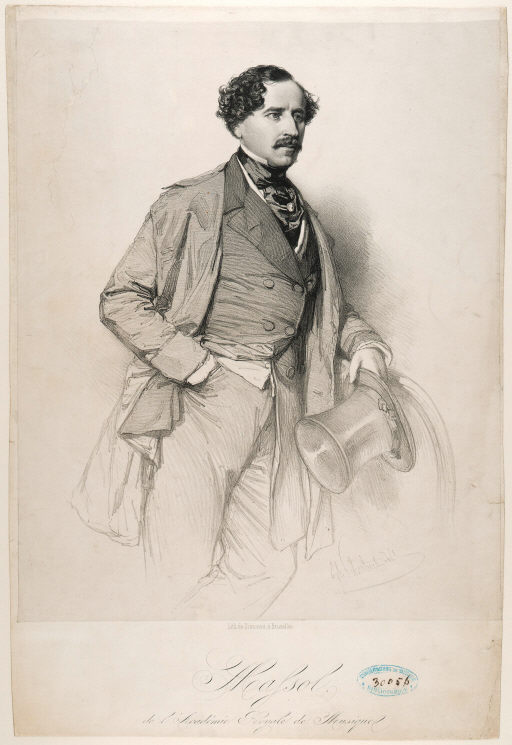
Eugène Massol circa 1845

Jean-Étienne-Auguste Massol (also known as Eugène Massol) (23 August 1802 – 30 October 1887) was a French operatic tenor and later baritone who sang in the world premieres of many French operas.

Massol was born in Lodève and trained at the Paris Conservatory under Charles-Henri Plantade. He won the conservatory's first prize in singing in 1825 and that same year made his stage debut as Licinius in Spontini's La vestale at the Paris Opera. He sang primarily secondary tenor roles until the late 1830s when he increasingly gravitated to baritone roles. In 1845 he went to Brussels where he sang leading baritone roles including the title role of Nabucco in its first performance at the Théâtre Royal de la Monnaie and went on to serve as the theatre's director from 1848 to 1849. During that period he also sang in London with the Royal Italian Opera at Covent Garden. In 1850 he returned to the Paris Opera and remained there as a principal baritone until his retirement from the stage in 1858. Massol died in Paris at the age of 85.

== Roles created ==
- Lorenzo (tenor) in La muette de Portici, 1828
- Second knight (tenor) in Le comte Ory, 1828
- Rodolphe (tenor) in Guillaume Tell, 1829
- Herald (tenor) in Robert le diable, 1831
- Christian (tenor) in Gustave III, 1833
- First drinker (tenor) in La Juive, 1835
- Cossé (tenor) in Les Huguenots, 1836
- Quasimodo (tenor) in La Esmeralda, 1836
- Michael (tenor) in Stradella, 1837
- Fortebraccio (tenor) in Guido et Ginevra, 1838
- Fieramosca (baritone) in Benvenuto Cellini, 1838
- Sévère (baritone) in Les Martyrs, 1840
- Bronzino (baritone) in Le comte de Carmagnola, 1841
- Mocénigo (baritone) in La reine de Chypre, 1841
- L'Inconnu (baritone?) in Le guérilléro, 1842
- L'homme de la forêt du Mans (tenor) in Charles VI, 1843
- Abayaldos (baritone) in Dom Sébastien, 1843
- Ruben (baritone) in L'enfant prodigue, 1850
- Ahasvérus (baritone) in Le Juif errant, 1852
