= Chelsea Opera Group =

Chelsea Opera Group is an organisation based in London which arranges concert productions of operas and other works. Its chorus and orchestra are composed of dedicated amateur, semi-professional and volunteer musicians, but they work alongside professional soloists and conductors.

The Group was founded in 1950 when David Cairns and Stephen Gray invited Colin Davis, who was at the time a 22-year-old clarinetist, to conduct a concert performance of Mozart's Don Giovanni in the Holywell Music Room, Oxford.

The Group has continued this practice since, mainly with the purpose of reviving neglected operas and lesser known versions of more familiar operas. Colin Davis was the president until his death in April 2013. The Group continues to perform operas and other works in London and in Salisbury.

== Company history and performances ==
Since Falstaff in 1956, a considerable number of operas by Giuseppe Verdi have appeared on the roster, including many of the lesser-known earlier works such as the 1847 version of Macbeth (in 2008); the original French version of I Vespri Sicilianni, the 1855 Les vêpres siciliennes (1977 and 1999); and several others such as Aroldo (1993); and Jérusalem (1997).

Musicians who have gained experience early in their careers by performing with the Group include Sir Simon Rattle, Sir Mark Elder, and Sir Roger Norrington, Dame Kiri te Kanawa, Sir Willard White, Sir John Tomlinson, Sarah Walker and Jill Gomez.

In addition to some of the standard operatic repertory over the years, a concert performance which drew attention to the Group was Donizetti's rarely performed Belisario (written in 1836), which starred Nelly Miricioiu under conductor Richard Bonynge and was given at Queen Elizabeth Hall on 13 February 2011.

== Members ==
- Dame Fiona Woolf – As well as being President of the Group, she is also a member of its choir.
