= Cornélie Falcon =

French soprano (1814–1897)

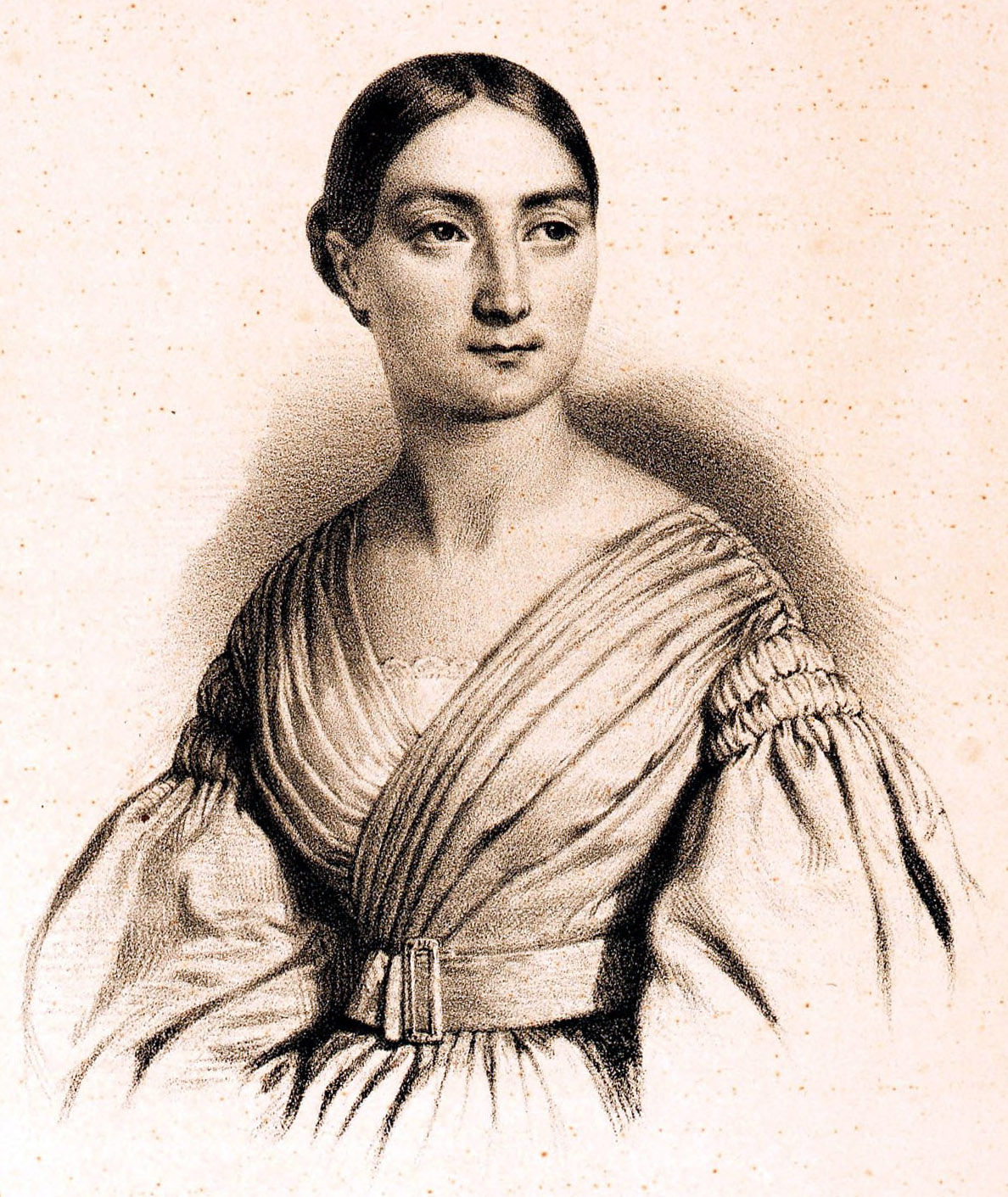
Cornélie Falcon in 1835

Cornélie Falcon (28 January 1814 (Note: Falcon's date of birth is given as 28 January 1814 by many sources Other sources give her date of birth as 28 January 1812 Braud 1913, quotes the minutes des actes de naissance (minutes of birth certificates) of the Préfecture du département de la Seine, which read: "Du 29 janvier de l'an dix-huit cent quatorze, à midi un quart, acte de naissance de Marie-Cornélie, de sexe féminin, née d'hier à midi, rue de Béthizy, nº10, quartier Saint-Honoré, fille de Pierre Falcon, tailleur, et de Edmée-Cornélie Mérot, son épouse." ("On 29 January of the year eighteen hundred fourteen, at noon and a quarter, birth certificate of Marie-Cornélie, of female sex, born yesterday at noon, Rue du Béthizy, no. 10, Saint-Honoré Quarter, daughter of Pierre Falcon, tailor, and of Edmée-Cornélie Mérot, his wife."). Thus, her birth occurred at noon on 28 January 1814 and was recorded on 29 January at 12:15 p.m. Braud specifically repudiates the errors of earlier publications by Larousse and Malherbes which give the year 1812.) – 25 February 1897) was a French dramatic soprano who sang at the Opéra in Paris. Her greatest success was creating the role of Valentine in Meyerbeer's Les Huguenots. She possessed "a full, resonant voice" with a distinctive dark timbre and was an exceptional actress. Based on the roles written for her voice her vocal range spanned from low A-flat(A♭_{3}) to high D(D_{6}), 2.5 octaves. She and the tenor Adolphe Nourrit are credited with being primarily responsible for raising artistic standards at the Opéra, and the roles in which she excelled came to be known as "falcon soprano" parts. She had an exceptionally short career, essentially ending about five years after her debut, when at the age of 23 she lost her voice during a performance of Niedermeyer's Stradella.

== Early life and training ==
She was born Marie-Cornélie Falcon in Le Monastier sur Gazeille (Velay) to Pierre Falcon, a master-tailor, and his wife Edmée-Cornélie. Falcon was one of three children; her sister Jenny Falcon was to marry a Russian nobleman and appear on the stage at the Mikhailovsky Theatre in St. Petersburg. Cornélie was enrolled at the Paris Conservatory from 1827 to 1831. There she first studied with Felice Pellegrini and François-Louis Henry, and later with Marco Bordogni and Adolphe Nourrit. She won a second prize in solfège in 1829, a first prize in vocalization (vocalisation) in 1830, and a first prize in singing (chant) in 1831.

== Debut in Robert le diable ==
At the invitation of Nourrit she made her debut at the age of 18 at the Opéra as Alice in the 41st performance of Meyerbeer's Robert le diable (20 July 1832). The cast included Nourrit and Julie Dorus (who had premiered the role in 1830). The director of the Opéra, Louis Véron, had made certain there was plenty of advance publicity, and the auditorium was packed. The audience included the composers Rossini, Berlioz, Cherubini, Halévy, and Auber, the singers Maria Malibran, Caroline Branchu, and Giulia Grisi, and two of France's greatest actresses from the Comédie-Française, Mademoiselle Mars and Mademoiselle Georges. Other audience members included the painters Honoré Daumier and Ary Scheffer, the librettist Eugène Scribe, and the critics and writers Théophile Gautier, Alexandre Dumas, Victor Hugo, and Alfred de Musset. Although understandably suffering from stage fright, Falcon managed to sing her first aria without error, and finished her role with "ease and competence." Her tragic demeanor and dark looks were highly appropriate to the part, and she made a vivid impression on the public.

Meyerbeer himself came to Paris to see Falcon as Alice, but after her fifth performance on 24 August she had to withdraw due to illness, and he did not get to hear her until 17 September. The following day Meyerbeer wrote to his wife: "The house was as full as it ever could be, 8700 francs (without subscription) and many people could not find seats. The performance was ... so fresh ... like the first performance of the work, not a trace of being played out. About Falcon I dare not reach any definite conclusion, ... only it is evident that she has a strong and beautiful voice, not without agility, at the same time that she is a vividly expressive (but somewhat overcharged) actress. Unfortunately her intonation is not completely pure, and I fear she will never overcome these weaknesses. In sum, I think that she could be an outstanding star, and I will certainly in any case write a principal role for her in my new opera." Meyerbeer's new opera would become Les Huguenots, in which Falcon was to achieve the greatest success of her career.

== Other early roles at the Opéra ==
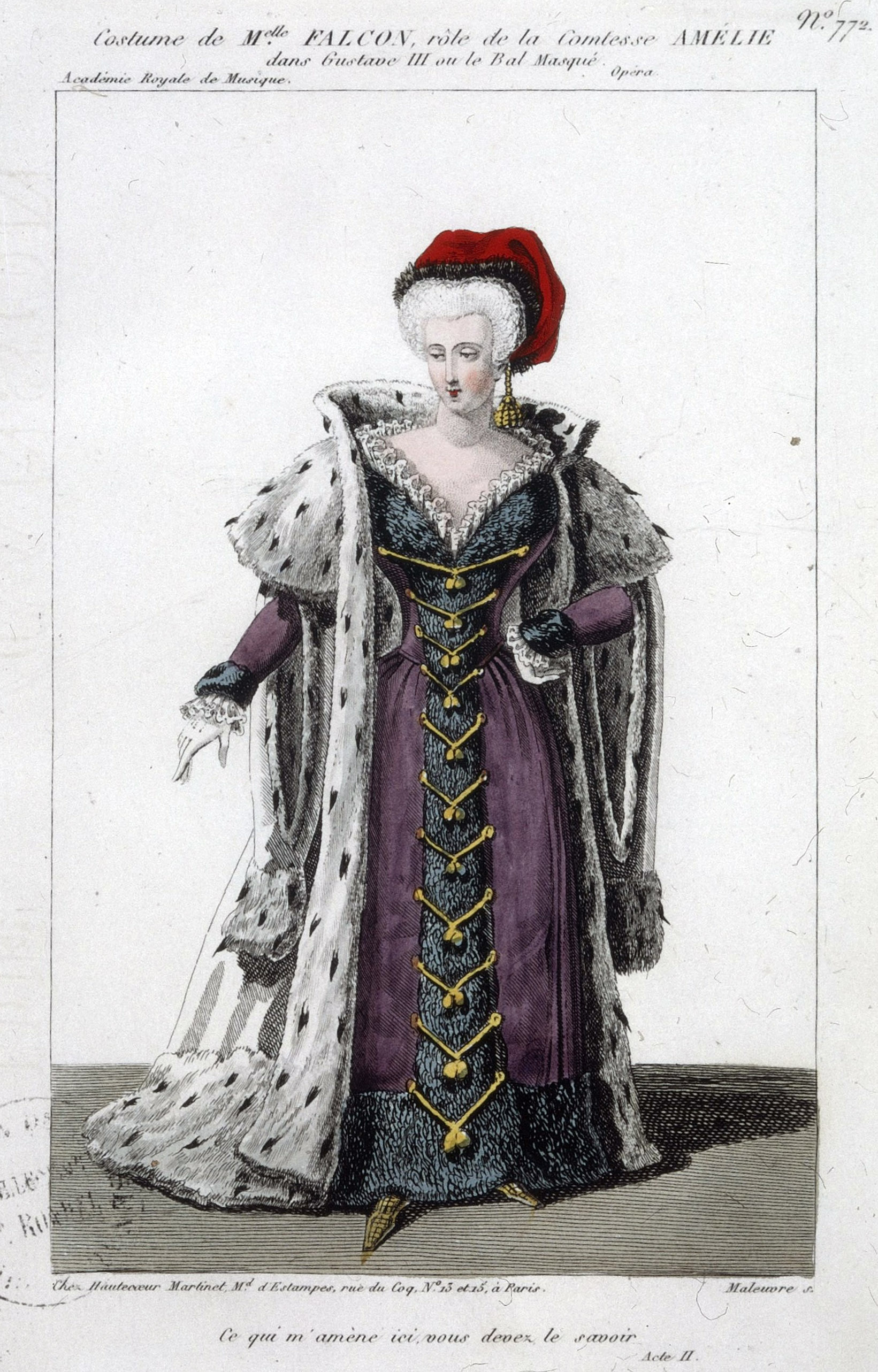
Costume design for Falcon as Amélie in Act 2 of Gustave III

Her next role at the Opéra came on 27 February 1833 when she sang Amélie in Auber's Gustave III. Ellen Creathorne Clayton has described the performance as follows:

Unfortunately, the part of the Countess Amélie, with its powder and hoops, and pretty coquetry, was not suited to the dark and mystic style of Cornélie. "Alas, Mdlle. Falcon!" cried Jules Janin; "this young creature, of such great hopes, sang without voice, without expression, without exertion, without energy, without point." She was stifled amid the mad gayety, the whirl of the dancers, the glare and splendor of the scenes. The singers in Gustave indeed were "nowhere;" the dancers reigned supreme.

Luigi Cherubini asked Falcon to create Morgiana in his new 4-act tragédie lyrique Ali Baba, ou Les quarante voleurs (Ali Baba and the Forty Thieves). The premiere was on 22 July 1833, and, as Spire Pitou tells us, "his invitation was more flattering than substantial, because the part of Morgiana hardly constituted a real challenge to a young and ambitious singer".

Falcon's next real opportunity to shine came with a new revival of Don Juan. This was a 5-act adaptation in French by Castil-Blaze, his son Henri Blaze, and Émile Deschamps of Mozart's Don Giovanni. The all-star cast included Falcon as Donna Anna and Nourrit as Don Juan with Nicolas Levasseur as Leporello, Marcellin Lafont as Don Ottavio, Prosper Dérivis as the Commandeur, Henri Dabadie as Masetto, Julie Dorus-Gras as Elvire, and Laure Cinti-Damoreau as Zerline. Berlioz, who must have attended a dress rehearsal, had some reservations about Falcon's performance, writing in Rénovateur (6 March 1834):

Mlle Falcon, so energetic in Robert le Diable, was physically speaking, with her contenance "pale as a beautiful autumn evening", the ideal Donna Anna. She had fine moments in the accompanied recitative sung over her father's body. Why then did she all at once go off the boil in the great aria of the first act, "Tu sais quel inflâme"? Oh! Mlle Falcon, with those black eyes of yours and the incisive voice you possess, there is no need to be afraid. Let your eyes flash and your voice ring out: you will be yourself, and you will be the incarnation of the vengeful Spanish noblewoman whose principal features your timidity veiled from us.

Berlioz was rather more frank in a letter in which he wrote "my position [as a critic] has not allowed me to admit that without exception all the singers, and Nourrit most of all, are a thousand miles below their roles." Nevertheless, Falcon was admirably suited to the part, and her reception after the opening on 10 March 1834, was even more favorable than that which she had received for Alice.

On 3 May 1834, Falcon sang Julia in a revival of Spontini's La vestale which was a benefit performance for Adolphe Nourrit. The cast, besides Nourrit as Licinius, included Nicolas Levasseur as Cinna, Henri Dabadie as the High Priest, and Zulmé Leroux-Dabadie as the Grand Vestal. The second act was repeated as an excerpt five more times that season. Falcon's portrayal of Julia was received favorably.

== Concerts with Berlioz ==
Berlioz's admiration for the singer was considerable, however, and with Véron's permission he engaged her for one of his concerts which he organized that winter in the hall of the Paris Conservatory. It was the second in the series and was presented on 23 November 1834 with Narcisse Girard conducting. Falcon sang Berlioz's new orchestrations of the songs La captive and Le Jeune Pâtrie breton, and earned an encore in which she sang an aria by Bellini. The concert also featured the premiere of Berlioz's new symphony Harold en Italie, and the audience included the Duc d'Orléans, Chopin, Liszt, and Victor Hugo. With the new symphony and Falcon as the star singer, the receipts were more than double those of the first concert on 9 November, which had featured the Symphonie fantastique and the overture Le Roi Lear. However, La captive, and not Harold, was the hit of the show, with the Gazette Musicale (7 December 1834) calling it "a masterpiece of melodic skill and orchestration." Falcon also appeared the following year in a concert on 22 November 1835 which was organized jointly by Girard and Berlioz, in which she again sang Berlioz's Le Jeune Pâtre breton and an aria from Meyerbeer's opera Il crociato in Egitto.

== Further roles at the Opéra ==
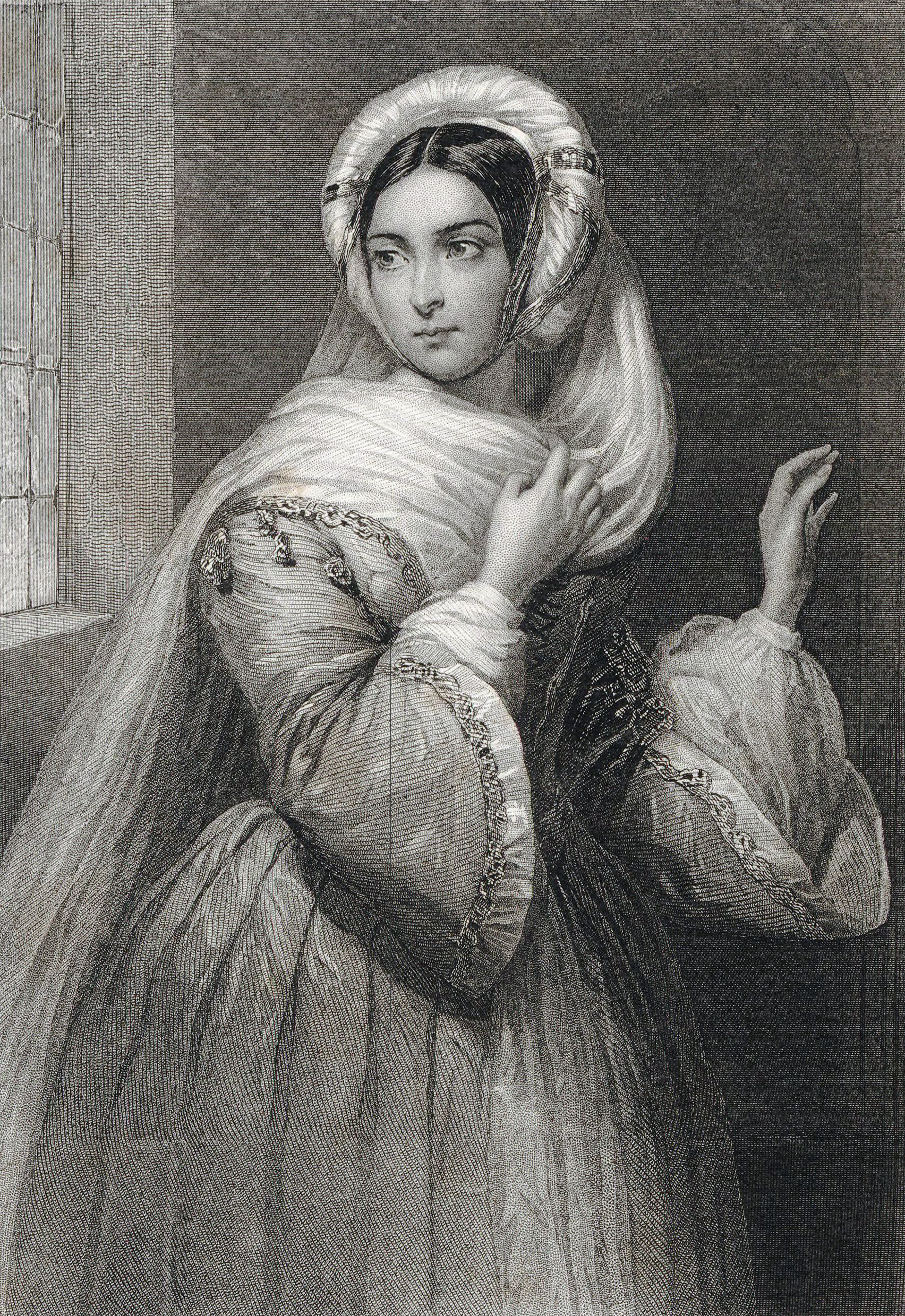
Falcon as Rachel in La Juive

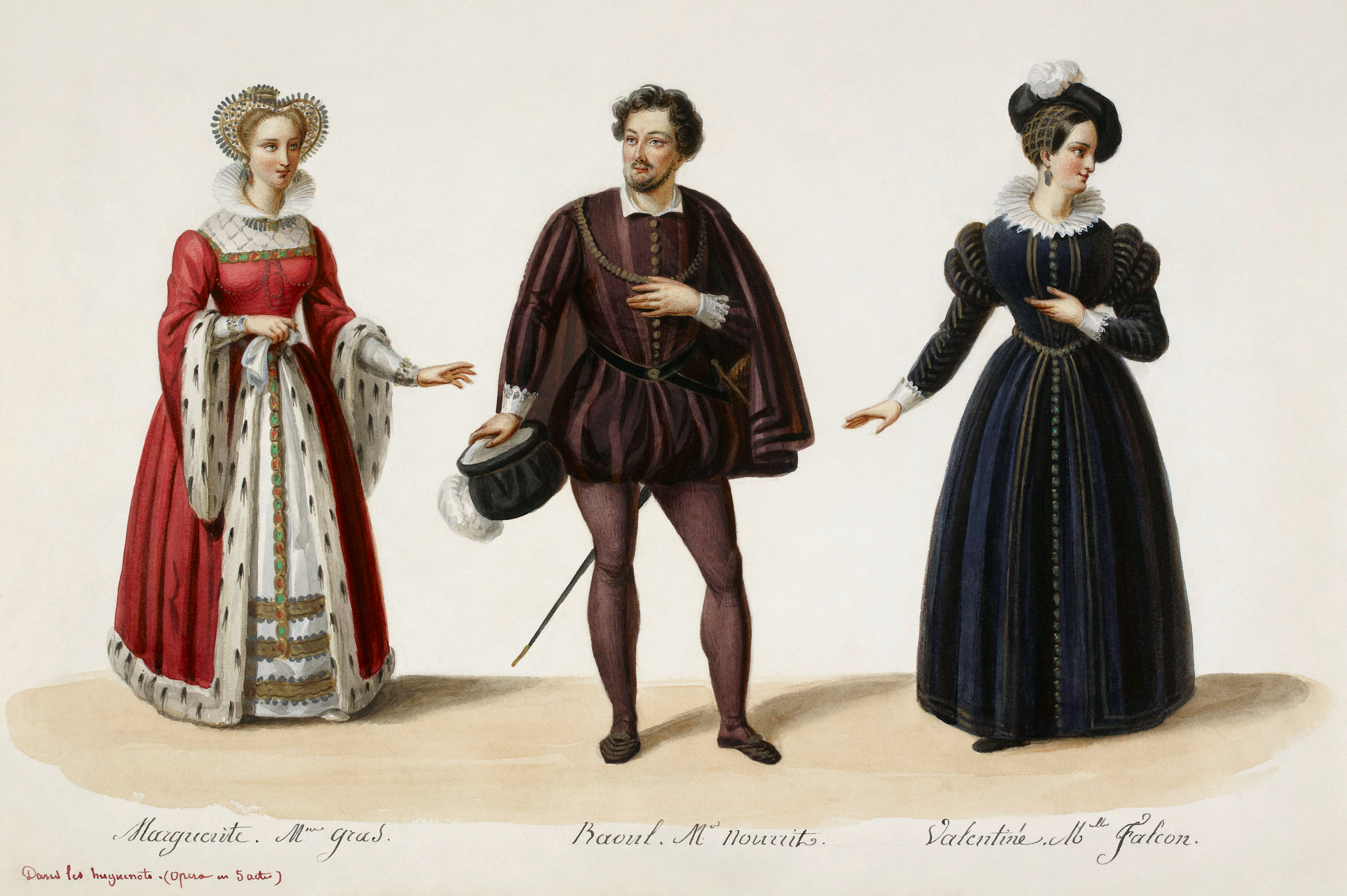
Falcon (right) as Valentine in Les Huguenots (1836), with Julie Dorus-Gras (left) as Marguerite, and Adolphe Nourrit as Raoul

Falcon's other creations at the Opéra included the roles of Rachel in Halévy's La Juive (23 February 1835), Valentine in Meyerbeer's Les Huguenots (29 February 1836), the title role in Louise Bertin's La Esmeralda (14 November 1836), and Léonor in Louis Niedermeyer's Stradella (3 March 1837). She also appeared as the Countess in Rossini's Le comte Ory and Pamira in Rossini's Le siège de Corinthe (1836).

By 1835, Falcon was earning 50,000 francs/year at the Opéra, making her the highest paid artist there, earning nearly twice as much as Nourrit and three times as much as Dorus.

== Vocal demise and final years ==
However, Falcon's singing career was remarkably short. She lost her voice catastrophically during the second performance of Stradella at the Opéra in March 1837. When Nourrit as Stradella asked her "Demain nous partirons – voulez-vous?" ('We leave tomorrow, are you willing?'), Falcon was unable to sing her line "Je suis prête" ('I am ready'), fainted, and was carried offstage by Nourrit. Berlioz, who was present, describes "raucous sounds like those of a child with croup, guttural, whistling notes that quickly faded like those of a flute filled with water". Falcon resumed performances, but her vocal difficulties continued, and she gave her last regular performance there in Meyerbeer's Les Huguenots on 15 January 1838. She resorted to all sorts of bogus treatments and remedies and moved to Italy for 18 months in the hope that the climate would have a beneficial effect.

Falcon returned for a benefit at the Opéra on 14 March 1840, in which she was to sing selections from Act 2 of La Juive and Act 4 of Les Huguenots with Gilbert Duprez, Jean-Étienne Massol, and Julie Dorus-Gras. Her appearance was described as seemingly relaxed, as she received a standing ovation at her entrance. Her range in notes was critically diminished, and she could not perform in opera. She was said to have wept in response to her own vocal state. However, soon after it was discovered that her vocal abilities were now gone. As Spire Pitou relates: "She wept at her own pathetic fate but continued despite her inability to do much else besides make the audience regret the loss of her gifts. When she came to the painfully poignant words in Les Huguenots, 'Nuit fatale, nuit d'alarmes, je n'ai plus d'avenir' ('Fatal night, night of alarms, I have no longer a future'), she could not support the dreadful irony of the line. She had no choice but to retire ..." There followed a few performances in Russia in 1840–1841, but after that, except for a few private performances in Paris at the court of Louis-Philippe and for the Duc de Nemours, she definitively quit the stage.

Many explanations have been offered for Falcon's loss of voice, including the enormous demands of the music of Grand Opera, the "ill-effects of beginning to sing in a large opera house before her body was fully mature", Falcon's attempts to lift her range above its natural mezzo-soprano range, and nervous fatigue brought on by her personal life. Benjamin Walton has analyzed the music written for her and has suggested there was a break in her voice between a' and b♭'. Gilbert Duprez, who sang with her on several occasions, speculated that her inability to negotiate this transition was a factor in her "vocal demise".

Falcon married a financier, becoming Madame Falcon-Malançon and a grandmother, and continued to live, reclusively, near the Opéra in the Chaussée d'Antin, until her death. At the end of 1891, she agreed to appear on stage at the Opéra on the occasion of a celebration of the centenary of Meyerbeer, "with three of her surviving contemporaries". She died in 1897 and was buried at Père Lachaise Cemetery.

== Reputation ==
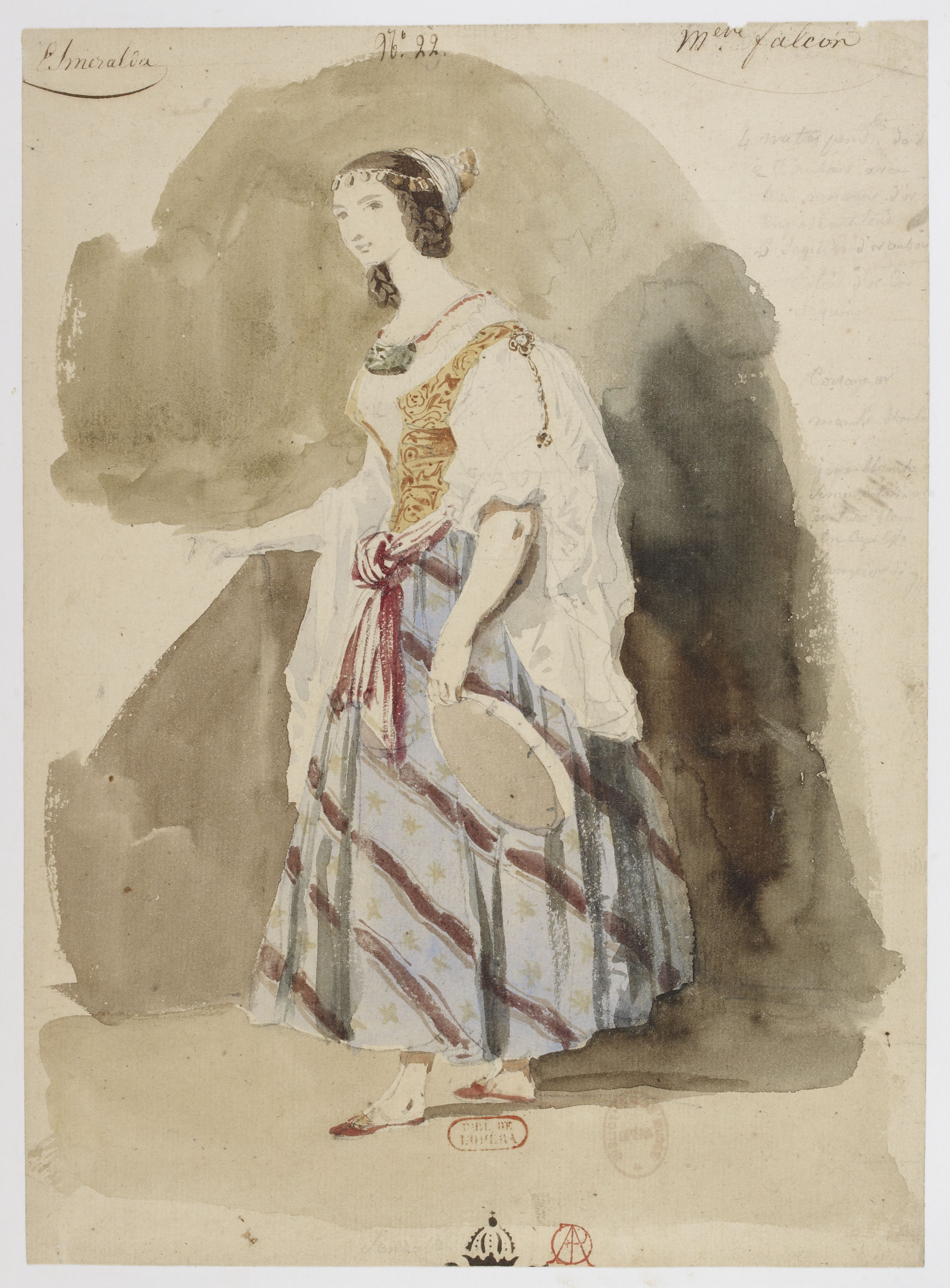
Costume design for Falcon in the title role of La Esmeralda by Louise Bertin

Having sung many of the important roles of early Grand Opera, Falcon was closely associated with the genre by contemporary audiences. The designation of the voice timbre "falcon", a dramatic soprano with a strong lower register (and lighter upper register) reflects this. Castil-Blaze described her voice in 1832:

...A range of two octaves extending from b to d''', and resonating at all points with an equal vigour. A silvery voice, with a brilliant timbre, incisive enough that even the weight of the chorus cannot overwhelm it; yet the sound emitted with such force never loses its charm or purity.

Falcon's personal reputation was also relevant to her career. "Perhaps the only singer of the time to maintain a reputation for chastity", this perception carried over to appreciation of her performances of the ingénue roles for which she was famed.

In 1844, Chorley wrote of Falcon as:

... the ill-starred Mademoiselle Falcon, the loved and the lost one of L'Académie.

She, indeed, was a person to haunt even a passing stranger. Though the seal of her race was upon her beauty, and it wore the expression of a Deborah or a Judith, (Note: Chorley implies, and Jordan 1994, p. 69, explicitly states (but does not cite a source for the information), that Falcon was of Jewish descent. She is also identified as Jewish in "F. Halévy", Archives israélites. Not a single source provides any documentary evidence to corroborate this. Kelly 2004, p. 167, labels Chorley's rather indirect phraseology as "anti-semitic doubletalk", although nothing in Chorley's description suggests any such intention.) rather than of a Melpomene, I have never seen any actress, who in look and gesture so well deserved the style and title of the Muse of Modern Tragedy. Large, dark, melancholy eyes, – finely cut features, – a form, though slight, not meagre, – and, above all, an expressiveness of tone rarely to be found in voices of her register, which was a legitimate soprano, – the power of engaging interest by mere glance and step when first she presented herself, and of exciting the strongest emotions of pity, or terror, or suspense, by the passion she could develope [sic] in action – such were her gifts. Add to these the charms of her youth, the love borne to her by all her comrades; – and the loss of her voice, followed by the almost desperate efforts made by her to recover it, and her disastrous final appearance when no force of will could torture destroyed Nature into even a momentary resuscitation, – make up one of those tragedies into which a fearful sum of wrecked hope and despair and anguish enters. Hers is a history, if all tales are true, too dark to be repeated, even with the honest purpose, not of pandering to an evil curiosity, but of pointing out the snares and pitfalls which lie in wait for the artiste, and of inquiring, for the sake of Art as well as of Humanity (the two are inseparable), if there be no protection against them, – no means for their avoidance?
