= Les Burgraves =

1843 play by Victor Hugo

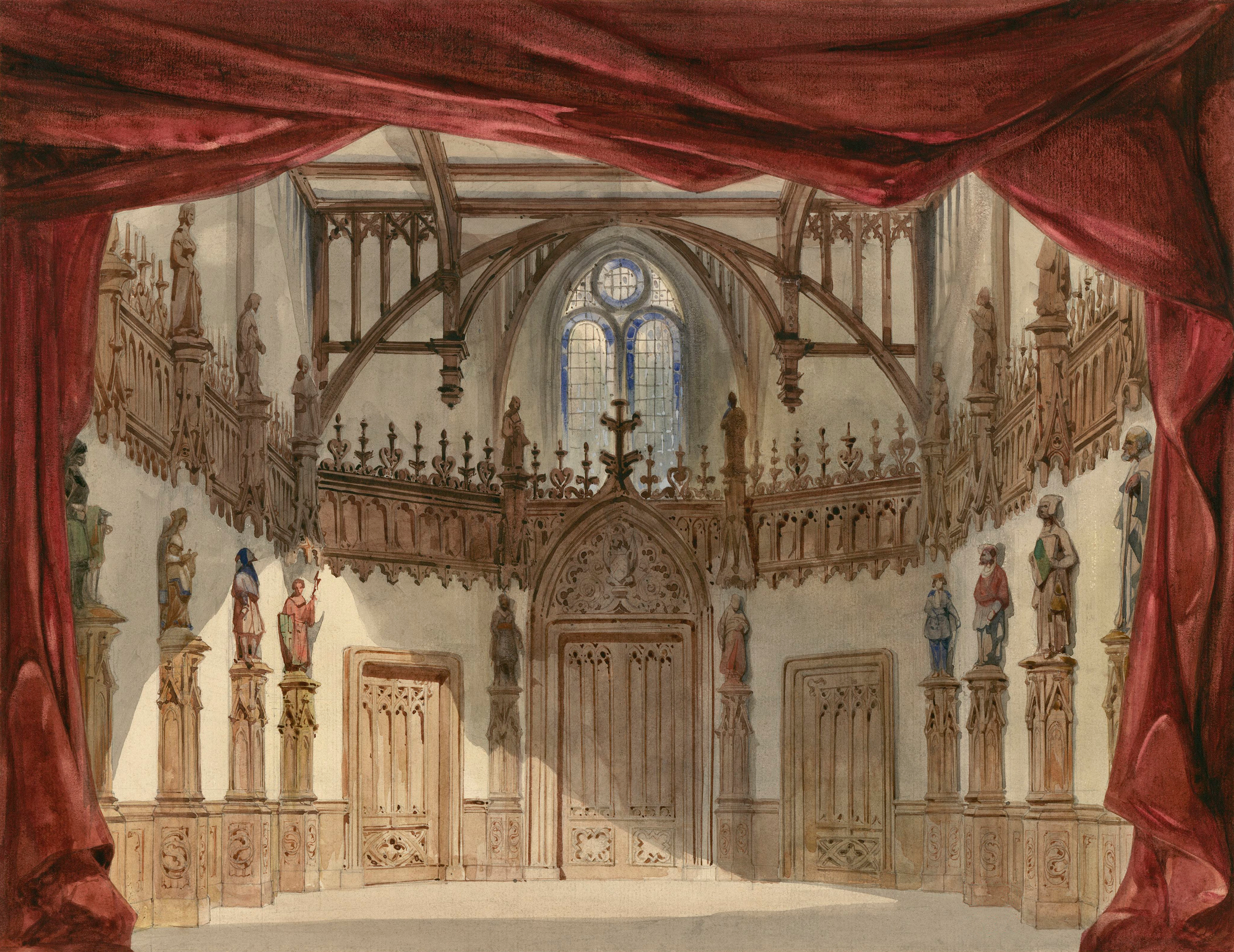
Set design by Charles-Antoine Cambon and Humanité René Philastre for the second act in the première production of Les Burgraves

Les Burgraves (French pronunciation: [le byʁɡʁav]) is a historical play by Victor Hugo, first performed by the Comédie-Française on 7 March 1843. It takes place along the Rhine and features the return of Emperor Barbarossa. The play failed commercially and was the last of Hugo's plays to be produced in his lifetime. It was the subject of an orchestral overture by the composer Guillaume Lekeu in 1890.

The play is associated thematically with Hugo's Le Rhin, an essayistic book about the Rhine; both were inspired by a trip along the river Hugo took with Juliette Drouet. Les Burgraves was published with a preface indicating that its depiction of a united Germany was part of a larger vision of a united Europe in which France would play a central role.
