= David Cairns (writer) =

British journalist, writer and musician (born 1926)

David Adam Cairns CBE (born 8 June 1926) is a British journalist, non-fiction writer and musician. He is an authority on the life of Berlioz.

== Life and career ==
David Adam Cairns was born in Loughton, Essex on 8 June 1926, the son of the distinguished neurosurgeon, Sir Hugh Cairns.

Cairns co-founded the Chelsea Opera Group (COG) in 1950, together with Stephen Gray. Their first concert was a concert performance in Oxford of Mozart's Don Giovanni under the baton of a 22-year-old Colin Davis. Cairns and Davis went on to form a partnership to champion the music of Berlioz. During the early 1960s, Davis conducted the COG in concert performances of several of Berlioz's large-scale works, including La Damnation de Faust, Roméo et Juliette, Les Troyens and Benvenuto Cellini. Cairns became classical programme coordinator for Philips Records between 1967 and 1972 (in the London division of Phonogram), when Davis released his ground-breaking cycle of Berlioz recordings for the label (with sleeve notes by Cairns).

His translation of Berlioz's autobiography (Mémoires) was first published by Gollancz in the United Kingdom in 1969.

His work in journalism has spanned a number of high-profile newspapers and magazines. He was chief music critic of the Sunday Times from 1983 to 1992, having earlier been music critic and arts editor of The Spectator. Other publications for which he has been a music critic include the Evening Standard, Financial Times and New Statesman. Before becoming a music journalist, he worked in the House of Commons Library.

His two-volume biography of Berlioz: Berlioz: The Making of an Artist 1803–1832 (published 1989) and Berlioz: Servitude and Greatness 1832-1869 (published 1999) has been widely praised. Reviewing the second volume for Opera magazine, Michael Kennedy described it as "one of the finest of all biographies of a composer" going on to praise his depiction "of Berlioz's lifelong struggle against the philistinism of Parisian musical life", and proclaims that "he has given Berlioz the literary memorial he deserves". The books won several major awards, including the Royal Philharmonic Society's Music award, the Yorkshire Post 'Book of the Year', the British Academy's Derek Allen Prize, the Samuel Johnson Prize for non-fiction, and biography of the year in the Whitbread Book Awards.

In 1983, he founded the Thorington Players, a London-based orchestra that he conducted regularly in St Mary's Church, Putney, and at St. John's, Smith Square.

In his book Mozart and his Operas, published in 2006 by University of California Press, Cairns stated part of the appeal of Mozart's music was its simultaneous embodiment of both "the perfection our souls long for and the sensation of our longing".

In 2019, a substantial collection of his essays on the composer was published under the title Discovering Berlioz - Essays, Reviews, Talks. A second volume of essays, Household Gods, is under preparation at Toccata.

He turned 100 in June 2026.

== Honours ==
In 1991, the French government named him an Officier de l’Ordre des Arts et des Lettres for his work in promoting Hector Berlioz as a key French composer. In 2013, he was elevated to the position of Commandeur. In the UK, he was appointed CBE in the 1997 New Year Honours. He was elected a Fellow of the Royal Society of Literature in 2001.

== Sources ==
- Grove Music Online, Cairns, David (Adam), article by Stanley Sadie.
