= Adolphe Nourrit =

French opera singer

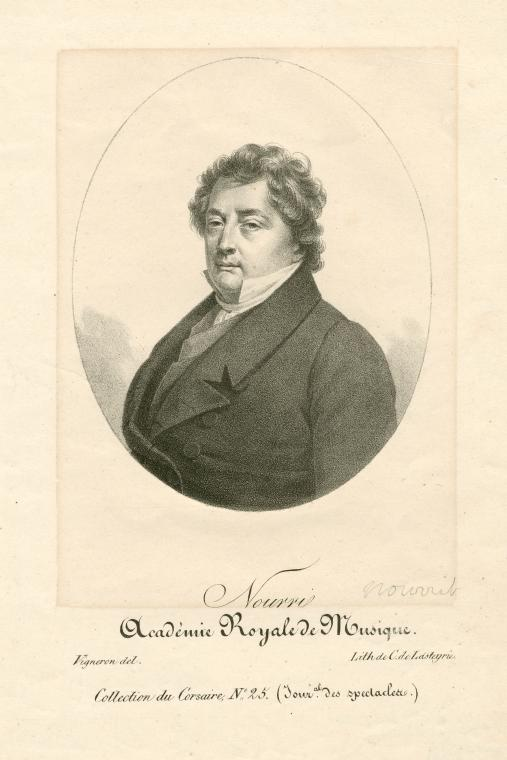
Adolphe Nourrit

Adolphe Nourrit (3 March 1802 – 8 March 1839) was a French operatic tenor, librettist, and composer. One of the most esteemed opera singers of the 1820s and 1830s, he was particularly associated with the works of Gioachino Rossini and Giacomo Meyerbeer.

== Early life ==
Nourrit was born on 3 March 1802 and raised in Montpellier, Hérault. His father, Louis Nourrit, was a well-known operatic tenor and diamond merchant. Louis' example deeply influenced Adolphe (and Adolphe's brother Auguste, who would also become a tenor). Adolphe studied singing and musical theory with his father and then, despite his father's objections, took lessons with Manuel del Pópulo Vicente García. He began his performing career shortly after finishing his studies with García, which lasted for 18 months.

== Career ==
Not yet 20 years of age, Adolphe Nourrit made his professional operatic debut in 1821 as Pylades in Gluck's Iphigénie en Tauride, being welcomed by his father performing the tiny role of a Scythian. In 1826, he succeeded Louis as the principal tenor at the Paris Opéra, a position he held until 1836.

While at the Opéra, he became a pupil of Gioachino Rossini with whom he would work frequently. Nourrit created all principal tenor roles in Rossini's French operas, namely Néocles in Le siège de Corinthe (1826), Aménophis in the revised version of Moïse et Pharaon (1827), the title role in Le comte Ory (1828), and Arnold in William Tell (1829). He was also the first to perform the roles of Masaniello in Auber's La muette de Portici (1828), Robert in Meyerbeer's Robert le Diable, Eleazar in Halévy's La Juive (1835), and Raoul in Meyerbeer's Les Huguenots (1836), among other parts. When La muette de Portici was performed in Brussels on 25 August 1830, the duet "Amour sacré de la patrie", with Nourrit in the tenor role, was the key to the "opera riot" that sparked the Belgian Revolution.

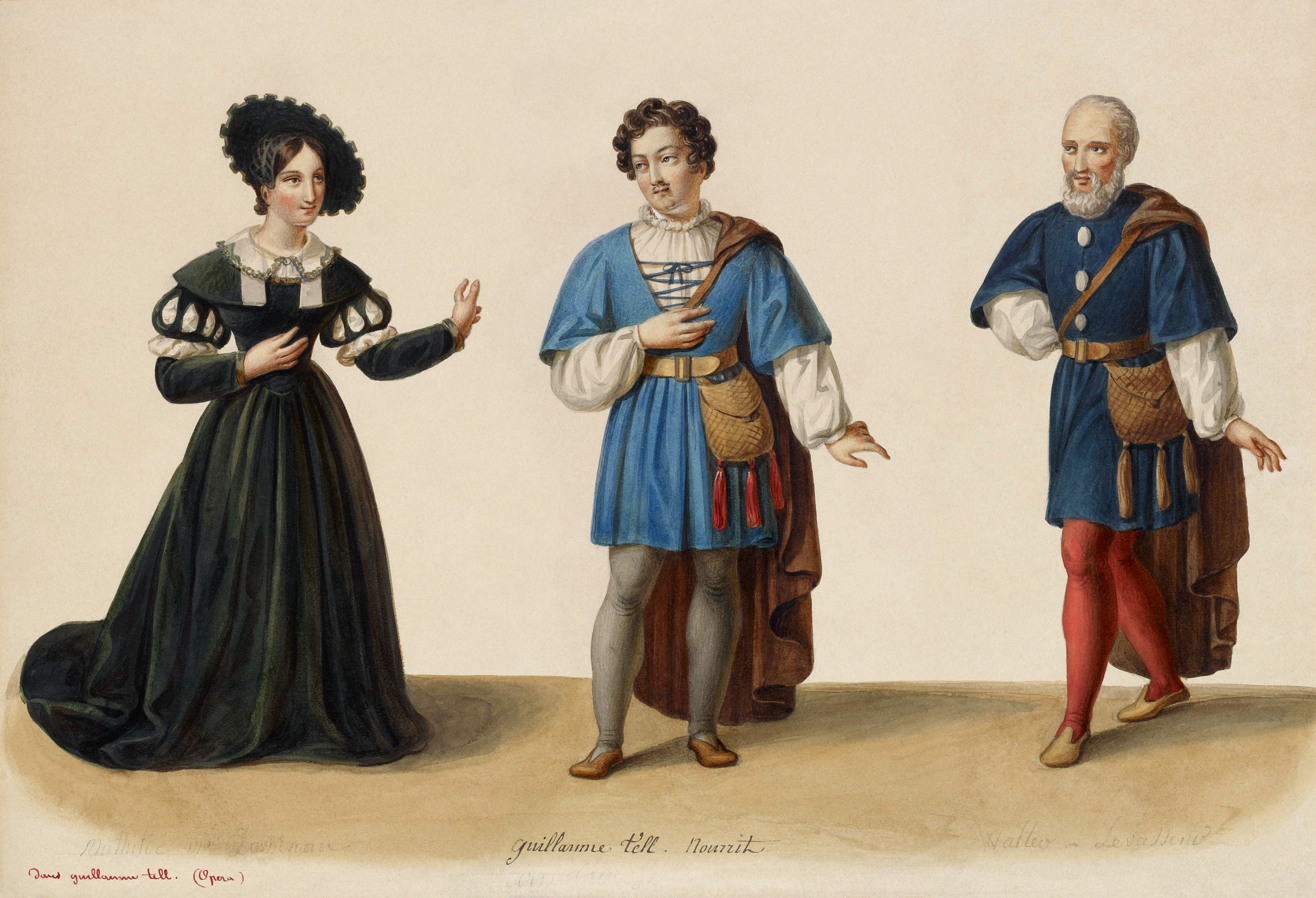
Costume designs by Eugène Du Faget for the original production of William Tell: Adolphe Nourrit in the middle, with Laure Cinti-Damoreau left and Nicolas Levasseur right.

Nourrit was an intelligent and cultured singer. He possessed a mellow and powerful vocal timbre during his prime and was a master of the head voice. His range extended up to E5, although he never went higher than D5 in public. He sang during a turning-point in French operatic vocalism, when performers began using a rounder, more open-throated and Italianate method of voice production than hitherto had been the case, with less resort to falsetto by tenors. Indeed, the scores of the musical passages written for Nourrit by Rossini, Giacomo Meyerbeer and others, contain orchestral markings which indicate that he could not have been singing in falsetto in his upper register. This was a departure from the practice of earlier male operatic interpreters.

As Nourrit's status at the Opéra increased, so did his influence upon new productions. Composers often sought, and usually accepted, his advice. For example, when it came to La Juive, he wrote the words of Eléazar's aria "Rachel, quand du Seigneur"; and he also insisted that Meyerbeer rework the love-duet climax of Act 4 of Les Huguenots until it met with his approval.

While at the Opéra, Nourrit received consistent positive reviews for his performances and his popularity led to his appointment as the professeur de déclamation pour la tragédie lyrique at the Conservatoire de Paris in 1827. He had many successful students, including the dramatic soprano Cornélie Falcon. In addition, he was concerned more broadly with the social aspects of singing, particularly with the "missionary" role of the performer. In the early 1830s, he embraced the ideas of Saint-Simonianism and dreamed of founding a grand opéra populaire which would introduce operatic works to the masses.

Beside singing and teaching, Nourrit composed and wrote scenarios for ballets at the Opéra de Paris, including the libretto for La Sylphide (1832).

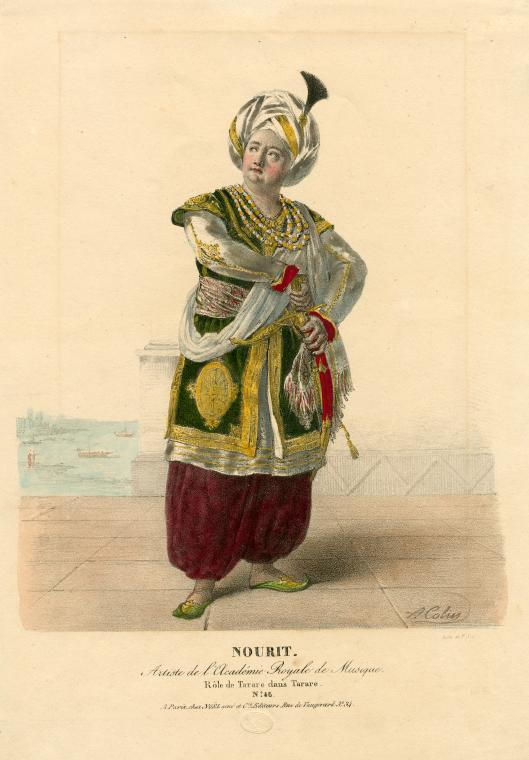
Nourrit in the title role of Tarare by Antonio Salieri

Nourrit's fame faded in the late 1830s, however, as new singers gained the favour of the Parisian public. In October 1836, impresario Duponchel engaged Gilbert Duprez, who commanded an exciting high C from the chest, as joint "First Tenor" with Nourrit at the Opéra de Paris. Nourrit accepted this arrangement as a hedge against his falling ill. He sang his Guillaume Tell part exceptionally well with Duprez in the audience on 5 October 1836 but five days later, during La muette de Portici, with Duprez again in the house, he suddenly went hoarse. After the performance, Hector Berlioz and George Osborne walked Nourrit up and down the streets as he despaired aloud and talked of suicide. On 14 October, he resigned from the Opéra.

Throughout this vexed period in his life, Nourrit enjoyed success as a recitalist. He was the first to introduce Franz Schubert's lieder to Parisian audiences at the celebrated soirées organized by Franz Liszt, Chrétien Urhan and Alexandre Batta at the Salons d’Erard in 1837. The intimacy of the salon apparently suited him well and although criticized for a weakening voice, his singing displayed impressive nuances of feeling and a wide dramatic range. His farewell performance at the Opéra happened on 1 April 1837. He embarked immediately on a tour of the provinces, but a liver ailment (possibly caused by alcoholism) forced him to cut short this venture.

While listening to Duprez at the Opéra on 22 November 1837, he decided to go to Italy in the hope of mastering the Italian manner of singing in order to succeed the great Italian virtuoso tenor Giovanni Battista Rubini when Rubini retired from the stage. He duly left Paris in December of that year. The following March, he began studies in Naples with the composer Gaetano Donizetti, who was a friend of Duprez's.

He also asked Donizetti to provide an opera for his début in Naples. Donizetti complied but the new work, Poliuto, was banned from performance on the secular stage by the authorities because of its Christian subject matter, and Nourrit felt betrayed. Meanwhile, he had been working hard to eradicate excessive nasal resonance from his tone production, only to lose his head voice as a result. His wife, arriving in Italy in July 1838, was shocked by what she considered to be the impaired sound of his singing and by the fragile state of his physique; he was being leeched regularly and was constantly hoarse. Nonetheless, his delayed Neapolitan début, which took place in Saverio Mercadante's Il giuramento on 14 November 1838, proved to be a success.

== Death ==
As Nourrit's liver disease worsened, so did his mental state, and his memory began to fail as well. On 7 March 1839 he sang at a benefit concert but was disappointed by the quality of his performance and the audience's reaction to it. The following morning, he jumped to his death from the Hotel Barbaia. His body was returned to Paris for burial; at Marseille, while the body was in transit to Paris, Frédéric Chopin played an organ transcription of Schubert's lied Die Sterne at a memorial service. (Note: Chopin was recuperating in Marseille after an extended stay at Mallorca with George Sand, during which his precarious health deteriorated due to constant rain and damp.) George Sand gives a description of Chopin's playing at Nourrit's Marseille memorial service in a letter of 28 April 1839:

Chopin sacrificed himself by playing the organ at the Elevation – and what an organ! Anyhow our boy made the best of it by using the less discordant stops, and he played Schubert's Die Sterne, not with a passionate and glowing tone that Nourrit used, but with a plaintive sound as soft as an echo from another world. Two or three at most among those present felt its meaning and had tears in their eyes.

Nourrit is buried in Montmartre Cemetery with his wife, who survived him by only a few months, dying shortly after the birth of their youngest son.

== See also ==
- Ballets by Adolphe Nourrit
