= Henri Rabaud =

French conductor, composer and pedagogue (1873–1949)

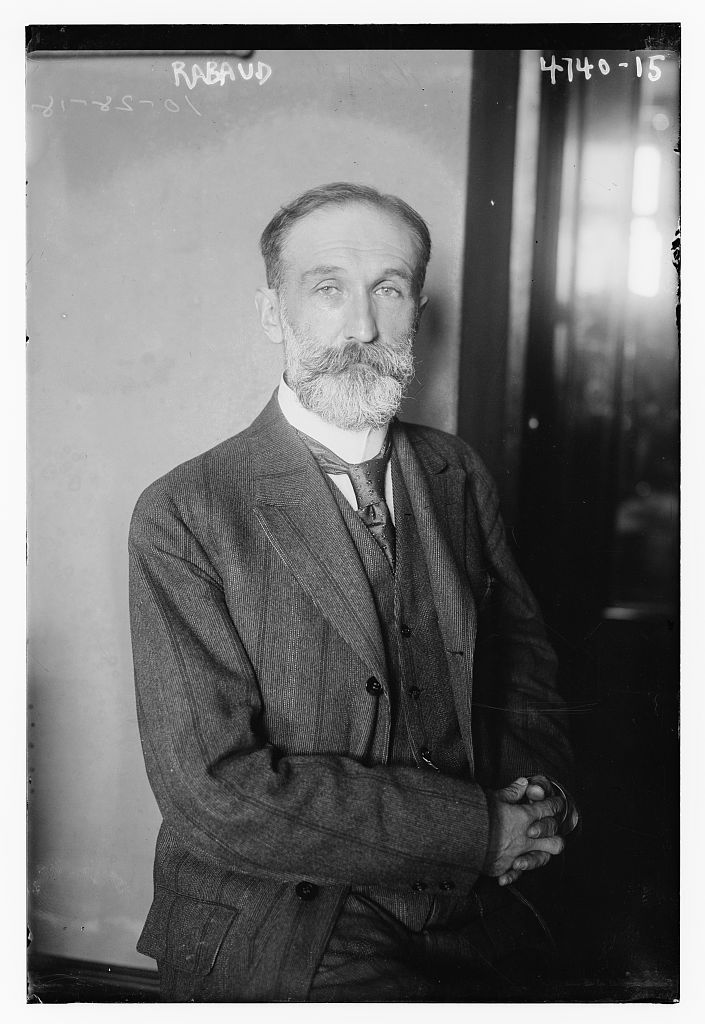
Rabaud in 1918

Henri Benjamin Rabaud (10 November 1873 – 11 September 1949) was a French conductor, composer and teacher, who held important posts in the French musical establishment and upheld mainly conservative trends in French music in the first half of the twentieth century.

Born in Paris into a musical family, Rabaud was a successful composer, conductor and academic, composer of several well-received works for the opera house and concert hall, conductor of the Paris Opéra and the Boston Symphony Orchestra, and, for more than twenty years, director of the Paris Conservatoire.

== Life and career ==
=== Early years ===
Rabaud was born in the 8th arrondissement of Paris on 10 November 1873, the son of Hippolyte François Rabaud and his wife Juliette, née van Steenkiste. Hippolyte was a leading cellist, a professor at the Paris Conservatoire; his wife was a professional singer. She used her family's stage name, Dorus, familiar from the previous generation which included her father Louis Dorus, a celebrated flautist, and her aunt, Julie Dorus-Gras, a singer who starred at the Paris Opéra and Covent Garden, creating roles in operas by Berlioz, Meyerbeer, Auber and Halévy.

After schooling at the Lycée Condorcet, Rabaud entered the Conservatoire in 1893, studying with Antonin Taudon (harmony) and André Gedalge and Jules Massenet (composition). In 1894 his cantata Daphne won him the Prix de Rome, which gave him a well-subsidised three-year period of study, two-thirds of which were spent at the French Academy in Rome, based at the Villa Medici. There he came to admire the operas of Verdi, Mascagni and Puccini. In 1899, when he was twenty-six, he came to wider public attention with his tone poem La Procession nocturne, depicting a well-known episode from Lenau's Faust, a composition that combined the fantastical and the religious. It became the most popular of his works. In July 1901 Rabaud married Marguerite Mathilde Mascart.

Rabaud's mystical oratorio Job (1900) enjoyed considerable success, and among his operas Mârouf, savetier du Caire ("Marouf, the Cobbler of Cairo") (1914), based on the Thousand and One Nights, was particularly popular. According to Grove's Dictionary of Music and Musicians, Rabaud here welded together Wagnerian form and oriental pastiche.

From 1914 to 1918 Rabaud was chief conductor at the Paris Opéra. Mârouf was staged by the Metropolitan Opera in New York in 1917, and at the suggestion of its conductor there, Pierre Monteux, Rabaud wrote a new aria for the star soprano, but the work met with limited success and was dropped from the company's repertoire after a couple of seasons. In 1918, in which year he was elected to the Académie française, Rabaud was appointed musical director of the Boston Symphony Orchestra. He left after a single season, declining a further year's appointment, as he wished to devote more time to composition. He was succeeded in Boston by Monteux, and returned to Paris.

=== Paris Conservatoire ===
Following the retirement of Gabriel Fauré as director of the Conservatoire in 1920, Rabaud was appointed as his successor. Although he revered Fauré (Note: On being appointed to the Conservatoire in 1920, Rabaud wrote to Fauré, "...each hour spent by me in the Conservatoire is henceforth for you an hour of leisure, permitting you to labour at those fine works which all your admirers await. Believe me among them, dear Master, and also among your friends who have for you the most loyal affection".) and admired his music – he made the standard orchestral arrangement of Fauré's Dolly Suite in 1906 (Note: Maurice Ravel, a pupil and devotee of Fauré, praised Rabaud for orchestrating Faure's piano duet suite "with the most ingenious tact and sublety") – he differed greatly from his predecessor in his musical outlook. Fauré, on being appointed in 1905, had radically changed the administration and curriculum, introducing compositions by the most modern composers, taboo under his predecessors. (Note: For instance, Fauré's immediate predecessor, Théodore Dubois, had unavailingly forbidden Conservatoire students to attend performances of Debussy's ground-breaking new opera, Pelléas et Mélisande in 1902.) Rabaud did not share Fauré's progressive views, declaring "modernism is the enemy".

Despite that dictum, Rabaud was not invariably hostile to innovative compositions by the younger generation. He was a mentor to the Conservatoire student Olivier Messiaen, and – an exceptional honour at the time – conducted the student orchestra in a performance of Messiaen's Le Banquet céleste. After Messiaen graduated, Rabaud frequently invited him to set exams and serve as juror for Conservatoire competitions. Other students during Rabaud's tenure included Jehan Alain, Jean Casadesus, Annie d'Arco, Maurice Duruflé, Henri Dutilleux, Maurice Gendron, Monique Haas, André Navarra and Paul Tortelier.

Rabaud's staff included Paul Dukas, Henri Büsser and Jean Roger-Ducasse (composition), Henri Dallier (harmony), Marcel Dupré (organ), Marguerite Long (piano), Marcel Moyse (flute), Claire Croiza (singing) and Louis Laloy (music history). After the outbreak of the Second World War and the German invasion of France, Rabaud sought to protect Jewish members of the faculty, including Lazare Lévy and André Bloch, but fearful that the Nazis would close the Conservatoire if he did not comply, he collaborated with the occupying authorities to the extent of supplying details of staff, and later of students, who were Jews or of Jewish family. Among the faculty members dismissed by the Vichy government on racial grounds was Bloch, whom Messaien succeeded as professor of harmony.

Rabaud retired from the Conservatoire in 1941 and retired to Neuilly-sur-Seine, where he died on 11 September 1949, at the age of 75.

== Compositions ==
Rabaud's cantata Daphné won the Premier Grand Prix de Rome in 1894. His opéra comique Mârouf, savetier du Caire combines the Wagnerian and the exotic. He wrote other operas, including L'appel de la mer based on J. M. Synge's Riders to the Sea, as well as incidental music and film scores, such as the 1925 score for Joueur d'échecs (Chess Player).

Orchestral music by Rabaud includes a Divertissement on Russian songs, an Eglogue, a Virgilian poem for orchestra, as well as the symphonic poem La procession nocturne, his best known orchestral work, still occasionally revived and recorded. He also wrote music for chorus and orchestra and two symphonies.

His chamber music includes several works for cello and piano as well as a Solo de concours for clarinet and piano — a competition piece written in 1901 for Conservatoire contests.

=== Partial list of works ===
Source: Grove's Dictionary of Music and Musicians.

Stage

- La Fille de Roland. Opera (1904)
- Mârouf, savetier du Caire Op. 14. Opera (1914)
- L'Appel de la mer. Opera, 1924 (based on Riders to the Sea by John Millington Synge)
- Rolande et le mauvais garçon. Opéra en 5 actes (1934)

Voice with orchestra

- Job Op. 9. Oratorio (1900)

Orchestra

- Divertissement sur des chansons russes Op. 2 (1899)
- Procession nocturne. "Symphonic poem after Nicolas Lenau" Op. 6 (1899)
- Eglogue. Poème virgilien Op. 7 (1899)
- Orchestration of Fauré's Dolly Suite (1906)
- Prélude et Toccata for piano and orchestra
- Symphony No. 1 in D minor Op. 1 (1893)
- Symphony No. 2 in E minor Op. 5 (1899)

Chamber music

- String Quartet Op. 3 (1898)
- Andante et Scherzo for flute, violin and piano Op. 8 (1899)
- Solo de Concours pour Clarinet et Piano Op. 10 (1901)

Other

- Incidental music for 'The Merchant of Venice', 1917 based on works by William Byrd, Giles Farnaby and others

== Notes, references and sources ==
=== Sources ===
- Canarina, John (2003). Pierre Monteux, Maître. Pompton Plains: Amadeus Press. ISBN 978-1-57467-082-0.
- Cœuroy, Andre (1922). La musique française modern (in French). Paris: Delagrave. OCLC 1047495275.
- Gribenski, Jean (2001). "L'exclusion des juifs du Conservatoire (1940–1942)". In Chimènes, Myriam (ed.). La vie musicale sous Vichy (in French). Brussels: Complexe. ISBN 978-2-87-027864-2.
- Jones, J Barrie (1989). Gabriel Fauré: A Life in Letters. London: B T Batsford. ISBN 0-7134-5468-7.
- Murray, Christopher Brent (2023). "Messiaen and the Paris Conservatoire". In Robert Sholl (ed.). Messiaen in Context. Cambridge: Cambridge University Press. ISBN 978-1-10-848791-7.
- Nectoux, Jean-Michel (1991). Gabriel Fauré: A Musical Life. Roger Nichols (trans). Cambridge: Cambridge University Press. ISBN 0-521-23524-3.
- Orledge, Robert (1979). Gabriel Fauré. London: Eulenburg Books. ISBN 0-903873-40-0.
