= Celestina Boninsegna =

Italian operatic soprano

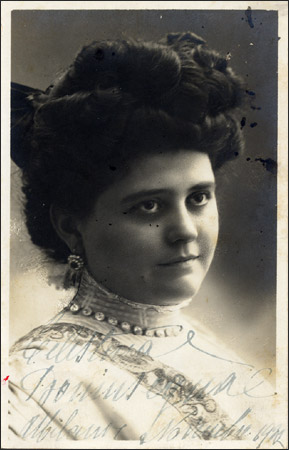
Celestina Boninsegna.

Boninsegna singing Verdi - Aida, Ritorna vincitor

Celestina Boninsegna (26 February 1877 – 13 February 1947) was an Italian operatic dramatic soprano, known for her interpretations of the heroines in Verdi's operas. Although particularly eminent in Verdi's works, she sang a wide repertoire during her 25-year career, including Rosaura in the world premiere of Mascagni's Le maschere. Boninsegna made many recordings between 1904 and 1918, and her voice was one of the most successfully captured on disc during that period.

== Career ==
Boninsegna was born in Reggio Emilia, where she began to study singing in her youth with Guglielmo Mattioli. She made her professional opera debut at the unusually young age of 15, singing Norina in Don Pasquale. Boninsegna entered the Conservatorio Gioachino Rossini in Pesaro shortly thereafter, where she studied under Virginia Boccabadati.

In 1897, she made her operatic début at Bari as Marguerite in Gounod's Faust. Subsequently, she sang Rosaura in the first Rome performance of Mascagni's Le maschere. This was followed by many engagements throughout Italy, elsewhere in mainland Europe, Great Britain and the United States, including at the Royal Opera House, Covent Garden, London (in 1904), La Scala, Milan (1904–5), the Teatro Real, Madrid (1905–6), and the Metropolitan Opera, New York City (1906–7). She also appeared in Boston (in 1909–10), at the Teatro Solís, Montevideo (1911), at the Liceu, Barcelona (1911–12), at the Mariinsky Theatre, St Petersburg (1914)—and at numerous less important venues in her homeland and abroad.

She retired from the stage in 1921 and spent the next two decades teaching singing. Amongst her pupils was the Australian dramatic soprano Margherita Grandi.

Boninsegna possessed a rich, resonant voice with a wide compass that was particularly suited to Verdi's music. In Italy in the 1900-1920 period, she was considered to be one of the finest interpreters of several Verdi heroines, including the title role in Aïda, Amelia in Un ballo in maschera, and Leonora in both Il trovatore and La forza del destino. Critics particularly admired her relatively smooth vocal delivery and the dignity and refinement that she gave to the vocal lines of the music at hand, although—as the opera commentator and record reviewer Michael Scott details in The Record of Singing (Duckworth, London, 1977)—her technique was not impeccable, with her ripe lowest register not fully integrated with the upper parts of her voice. (See also The New York Times of 22 December 1906 for a review of her first Met Aïda and a summary of her vocal strengths and weaknesses.)

In an era of dynamic and passionate singing-actresses (such as Gemma Bellincioni, Eugenia Burzio and Rosina Storchio in Italy and Emmy Destinn in New York), Boninsegna's acting skills were dull in comparison, and her career suffered to some extent as a result. Furthermore, with the exception of the part of Santuzza in Cavalleria rusticana and the title role in Puccini's Tosca, Boninsegna was either unfamiliar with, or simply not cast in, the verismo repertory which was highly popular during the time that she was performing—a problem that prejudiced her career. Nonetheless, she did achieve considerable success on 78-rpm gramophone records, being one of the first lyric-dramatic sopranos whose voice recorded well.

She died in Formigine (MO) in 1947.

== Roles ==
- Aida, Aida (Verdi)
- Amelia, Un ballo in maschera (Verdi)
- Amica, "Amica" (Mascagni)
- Brünnhilde, Siegfried (Wagner)
- Donna Anna, Don Giovanni (Mozart)
- Elena, I vespri siciliani (Verdi)
- Elena, Mefistofele (Boito)
- Elsa, Lohengrin (Wagner)
- Elvira, Ernani (Verdi)
- Gilda, Rigoletto (Verdi)
- Gioconda, La Gioconda (Ponchielli)
- Jone, Jone (Petrella)
- Leonora, Il trovatore (Verdi)
- Leonora, La forza del destino (Verdi)
- Margherita, Mefistofele (Boito)
- Marguerite, Faust (Gounod)
- Marguerite, La damnation de Faust (Berlioz)
- Maria, Guglielmo Ratcliff (Mascagni)
- Maria, Maria di Rohan (Donizetti)
- Nedda, Pagliacci (Leoncavallo)
- Norina, Don Pasquale (Donizetti)
- Norma, Norma (Bellini)
- Queen of Sheba, Die Königin von Saba (Goldmark)
- Rachel, La Juive (Halévy)
- Regina, Ruy Blas (Marchetti)
- Rosaura, Le maschere (Mascagni)
- Santuzza, Cavalleria rusticana (Mascagni)
- Tosca, Tosca (Puccini)
- Valentine, Les Huguenots (Meyerbeer)
- (Role unknown) in Janko (Bandini)

== Recordings ==
For her day, Boninsegna was a prolific recording artist. She recorded 106 sides, nearly as many as the combined output of her contemporaries Olive Fremstad, Emma Eames, Lillian Nordica, and Marcella Sembrich. She began to record in 1904 for Gramophone & Typewriter Co Milan with "In quelle trine morbide" from Manon Lescaut and went on to make over thirty recordings for that label by 1918. She also recorded for Pathé, Edison, His Master's Voice and Columbia. Her Columbia recordings, made between 1909 and 1910, were amongst her most acclaimed and were later issued on LP. Many arias from her recordings, including those made for Columbia, are available on CD:

- Celestina Boninsegna — Arias Label: Pearl 9219
- Lebendige Vergangenheit (Legendary Voices) — Celestina Boninsegna Label: Preiser 89584
- Celestina Boninsegna, The Symposium Opera Collection Vol. 13. Label: Symposium 1323
- The Complete Celestina Boninsegna, Label: Marston Records

== Notes and references ==
- Carner, Mosco (1985) Giacomo Puccini: Tosca, Cambridge University Press, p. 146. ISBN 0-521-29661-7
- Celletti, Rodolfo/Valeria Pregliasco Gualerzi: "Celestina Boninsegna", Grove Music Online ed. L. Macy (Accessed October 20, 2008), (subscription access)
- Guzmán, Mario Cánepa (1976) La opera en Chile, 1839–1930, Editorial Del Pacífico.
- Hoffmann, Frank W. (2005) Encyclopedia of Recorded Sound: M–Z Index, CRC Press. ISBN 0-415-93835-X
- The New York Times, "Aida for the First Time at the Metropolitan", December 22, 1906, p. 9.
- Porter, Andrew (1989) Musical Events: A Chronicle, 1983–1986 Summit Books, p. 345. ISBN 0-671-63537-9
- Rideout, Robert (2000) "Celestina Boninsegna", Record Collector, Vol. 45, No. 1 (updated and revised version reprinted on mrichter.com). Accessed 13 October 2008.
- Rosenthal, H. and Warrack, J. (1979) "Boninsegna, Celestina" in The Concise Oxford Dictionary of Opera, 2nd Edition, Oxford University Press. ISBN 0-19-311321-X
- Salgado, Susana "The Teatro Solis: 150 Years of Opera, Concert, and Ballet in Montevideo", Wesleyan University Press. 2003 (ISBN 978-0819565945)
- Tuggle, Robert From The Metropolitan Opera Archives: Celestina Boninsegna. Metropolitan Opera, New York. Accessed 13 October 2008.
