= List of compositions by Friedrich Kalkbrenner =

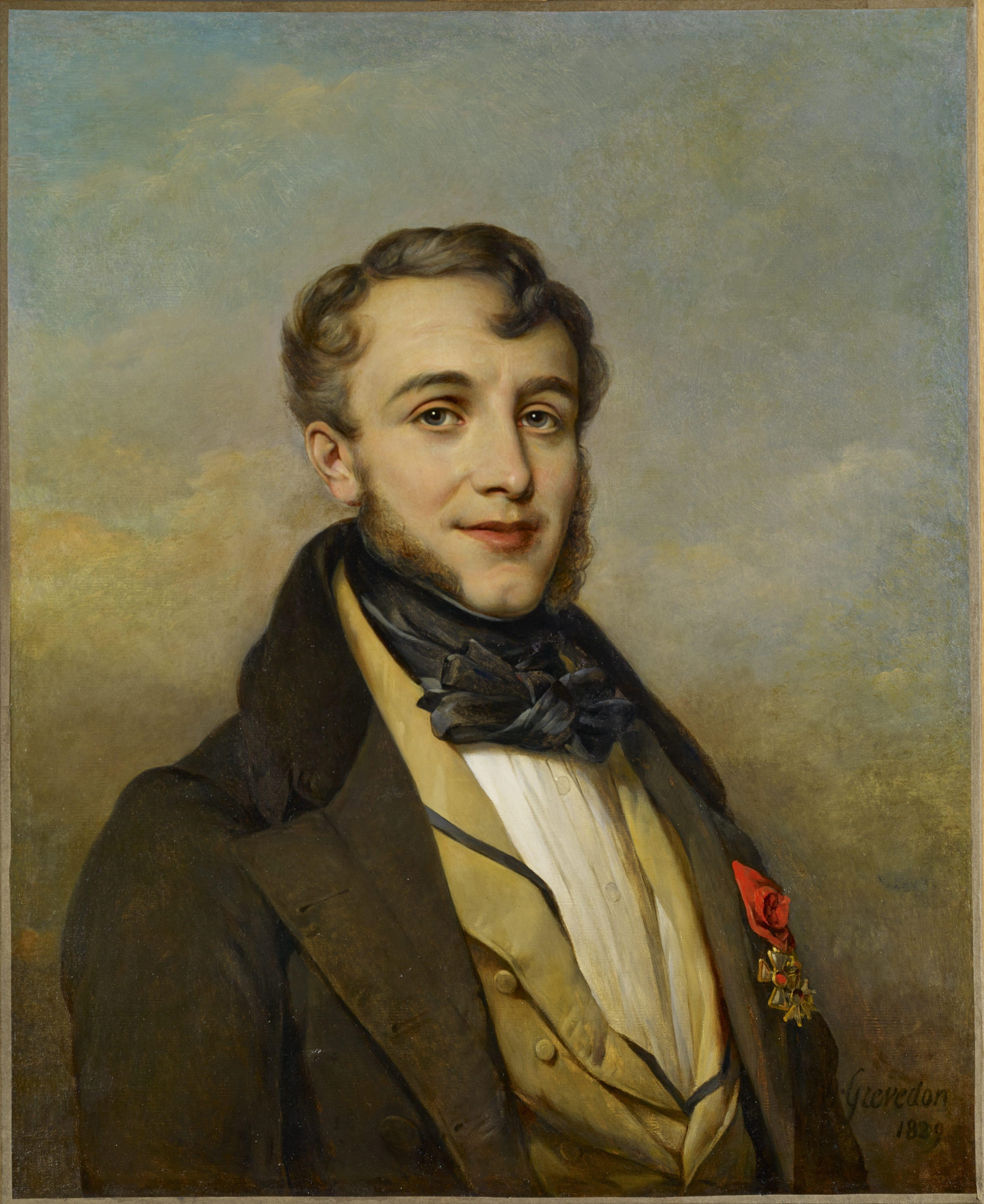
Friedrich Kalkbrenner

This is a list of compositions by Friedrich Kalkbrenner.

== Piano ==
=== Piano Solo ===
- Three Piano Sonatas, Op. 1
- Three Piano Sonatas, Op. 4
- Fantasia No. 1 in C major, Op. 5
- Fantasia No. 3 in E♭ minor, Op. 8
- Piano Sonata in F major, Op. 13
- 24 Etüden durch alle Tonarten, Op. 20
- Variations on a theme by Rousseau, Op. 23
- 6 Waltzes, Op.24
- Adagio and Rondo in E♭ major, Op. 27
- Piano Sonata in F major, Op. 28
- Rondino in E♭ major, Op. 32
- Piano Sonata in A major, Op. 35
- Il Lamento, Op. 36
- Fantasia No. 8 in C major, Op. 37
- Piano Sonata in A♭ major, Op. 40
- Piano Sonata in A♭ major for the left hand, Op. 42
- Rondo Polacca in A major, Op. 45
- Dramatic Sonata, Op. 46
- Piano Sonata in A minor, Op. 48
- Fantasie No. 10 "Sur un air irlandais", Op. 50
- Introduction and Rondo in E♭ major, Op. 52
- Three Romances, Op. 54
- Polonaise Brillante, Op. 55
- Piano Sonata in F minor "In honour of my master J. Haydn", Op. 56
- Introduction and Rondo in B♭ major, Op. 57
- Rondo Pastoral in A major, Op.59
- Rondo in A major on a theme by Mr. Bishop, Op. 65
- Rondeau Villageoise, Op. 67
- Effusio musica, Op. 68
- Les Charmes de la Walse, Op. 73
- Introduction and Rondino in E♭ major, Op. 78
- 24 Preludes, Op. 88
- Romance and Rondo Brillant in F major, Op. 96
- Menuett und Rondo, Op. 97
- Introduction and Rondo Brillant in C major, Op. 101
- Theme and Variations, Op. 103
- Capriccio in B minor, Op. 104
- Etudes, Op. 108
- Rondo Brillant sur un motif de L’Opéra “Se Serment” ou le faux monnayeurs, Op. 116
- Variations on a mazurka by Chopin, Op. 120
- Les Soupirs, Op. 121
- Rondo Brillant in D major, Op. 130
- Le Fou, Op. 136
- La femme du Marin, Op. 139
- Introduction and Polonaise Brillante, Op.141
- Souvenir de "Guido et Ginevra" de Halévy, Op. 142
- 25 Grand études, Op. 143
- Three Romances, Op. 148
- Rondoletto Brillant in D major, Op. 150
- Rondo Brillant in C major, Op. 162
- Piano Sonata in A♭ major, Op. 177
- Fantaisie pour le Piano sur le célèbre air Auld Robin Gray, Op.178
- 4 Toccatas, Op.182
- L'Écosse, Op. 184
- Etudes for Piano, Op. 185
- 3 Nocturnes, Op. 187
- 3 Songs without words, Op. 189

=== Piano Four hands ===
- Double Sonata in C major, Op. 3
- Double Sonata in F major, Op. 79
- Grand Duo for 2 pianos in D minor, Op. 128

== Chamber music ==
=== Piano Trio ===
- Piano Trio No. 1 in E minor, Op. 7
- Piano Trio No. 2 in A♭ major, Op. 14
- Piano Trio No. 3 in B♭ major, Op. 26
- Piano Trio No. 4 in D major, Op. 84
- Piano Trio No. 5 in A♭ major, Op. 149

=== Piano Quartet ===
- Piano Quartet No. 1 in D major, Op. 2
- Piano Quartet No. 2 in E minor, Op. 176( possibly Op. 175)

=== Piano Quintet ===
- Piano Quintet No. 1 in C major, Op. 30
- Piano Quintet No. 2 in A minor, Op. 81
- Variations brillantes sur l'Air Je suis le petit tambour, Op. 112

=== Piano Sextet ===
- Piano Sextet in G major, Op. 58
- Piano Sextet in F minor, Op. 135

=== Other ===
- Duo for Cello and Piano in D minor, Op.11
- Septet in E♭ major, Op. 15
- Sonata for Flute or Violin and Piano in E♭ major, Op. 22
- Sonata for Flute, Cello and Piano in B♭ major, Op. 39
- Duo for Violin and Piano in B minor, Op.49
- Nocturne for Horn or Cello and Piano in F major, Op. 95
- Septet in A major, Op. 132
- Grand March, Storm, and Polonaise for piano and strings, Op. 93

== Orchestral ==
=== Piano and Orchestra ===
- Piano Concerto No. 1 in D minor, Op.61
- Gage d'Amitié, Introduction & Rondo brillant for piano and orchestra, Op.66
- Fantasie and grand variations for piano and orchestra, Op.70
- Fantaisie et Variations sur un Thème éccosais for piano and orchestra, Op.72
- Fantaisie et variations brillantes sur l'air 'Di tanti palpiti', Op.83
- Piano Concerto No. 2 in E minor, Op.85
- Bravura Variations on 'God Save the King', Op.99
- Introduction and Rondo Brilliant in C major for piano and orchestra, Op.101
- Adagio ed Allegro di bravura, Op.102
- Piano Concerto No. 3 in A minor, Op.107
- Le Rêve, Op.113
- Concerto for two pianos in C major, Op.125
- Piano Concerto No. 4 in A♭ major, Op.127
- Les Charmes de Carlsbad, Op.174
