= Boninsegna =

Boninsegna is an Italian surname. Notable people with the surname include:

- Celestina Boninsegna (1877–1947), Italian opera singer
- Roberto Boninsegna (born 1943), Italian footballer and manager

== See also ==
- Duccio di Buoninsegna
