= Guido et Ginevra =

Opera by Jacques Fromental Halévy

- Grand opera by Fromental Halévy
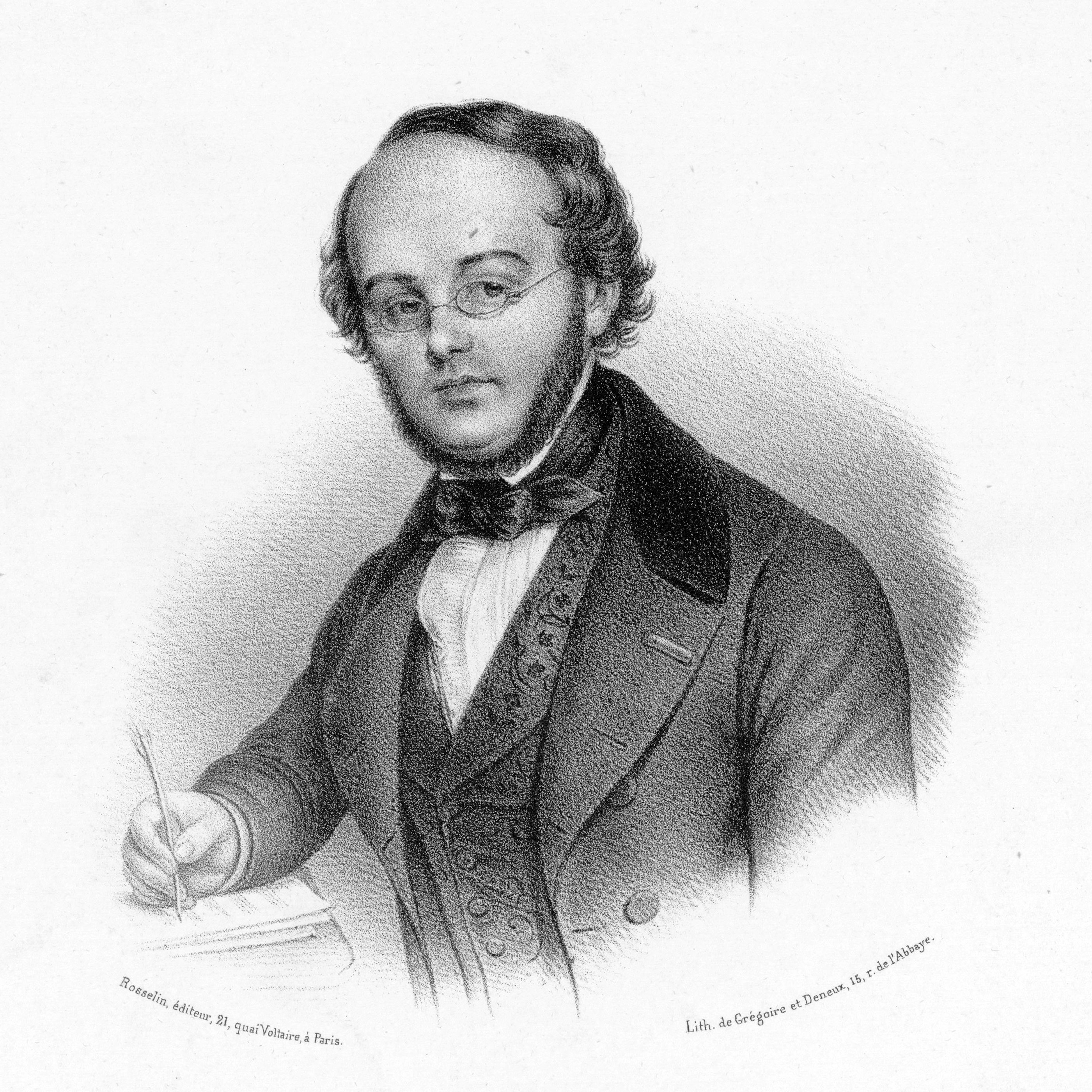
- The composer in 1825
- Librettist: Eugène Scribe
- Language: French
- Premiere: 5 March 1838; Salle Peletier, Paris

Guido et Ginevra, ou La Peste de Florence (French: Guido and Ginevra, or the Plague at Florence) is a grand opera in five acts by Fromental Halévy to a libretto by Eugène Scribe. It was premiered on 5 March 1838 by the Paris Opera at the Salle Le Peletier.

== Performance history ==
Guido et Ginevra was only a moderate success for Halévy, not nearly as applauded as his previous grand opera La Juive (1835) or as La reine de Chypre which followed it (1841). However, after its premiere it was soon played in all the major European centres. When the opera was revived in Paris in 1840 it was cut to four acts. It was translated into Italian and performed in three acts by the Théâtre-Italien at the Salle Ventadour beginning on 17 February 1870. It was performed in German in Mannheim beginning on 3 April 1879, and Hamburg, on 20 March 1882. No recent productions are known.

The opera contains touches of the composer's innovative orchestration, with a mélophone in Act II, and with Ginevra's tomb scene set to dark woodwind and brass instruments using diminished seventh harmonies.

== Roles ==
Role	Voice type	Premiere Cast, 5 March 1838 (Conductor: )
Cosme de Médicis	bass	Nicolas Levasseur
Manfredi, Duke of Ferrara	bass	Nicolas-Prosper Dérivis
Guido, a young sculptor	tenor	Gilbert Duprez
Forte-Braccio, condottiere	tenor	Jean-Étienne-Auguste Massol
Lorenzo, steward to Médicis	bass	Molinier
Téobaldo, sacristan of Florence Cathedral	bass	Ferdinand Prévost
Ginevra, daughter of Médicis	soprano	Julie Aimée Dorus-Gras
Ricciarda, a singer	mezzo-soprano	Rosine Stoltz
Léonore, chambermaid of Ginevra	soprano	Mme Morin
Antonietta, young peasant	soprano	Maria Flécheux

== Synopsis ==
Scribe drew the elements of his plot from the history of Florence by Louis-Charles Delécluze

=== Act 1 ===
The Medici court

Ginevra is to be married to the Duke of Ferrara.

=== Act 2 ===
During the ceremony, a poisoned veil she has been given causes her to faint away in a deathlike trance; the sculptor Guido mourns her. It is assumed that she has the plague.

=== Act 3 ===
The Medici vault

Buried in the Medici vault she awakes.

=== Act 4 ===
Guido offers her shelter.

=== Act 5 ===
The village of Camaldoli

Ginevra is reunited with her father, who agrees to her marriage with Guido. A procession of thanksgiving ends the opera.
