= Richard Leech (tenor) =

American opera singer

Richard Leech (born March 26, 1957) is an American operatic tenor, recipient of the Richard Tucker Award in 1988, and particularly associated with lyric roles of the Italian and French repertories.

Raised and educated in Vestal, New York, he attended Eastman School of Music but dropped out after a semester. He began his career in the early 1980s, appearing with the Tri-Cities Opera.

Leech made his debut at the New York City Opera in 1984 as Rodolfo in La bohème. He soon added the roles of the Duke in Rigoletto and Alfredo in La Traviata.

On March 25, 1987, Leech began a two-decade affiliation with Cincinnati Opera with his debut as Hoffmann in Les contes d'Hoffmann. He went on to sing Roméo in Roméo et Juliette in 1989 and 1994, Riccardo in Un ballo in maschera in 1991, Cavaradossi in Tosca in 1993, Don José in Carmen in 2004, and the title role of Gounod's Faust in 2007. Cincinnati Opera presented him in a solo recital for its 75th anniversary in 1995.

For San Diego Opera, where he appeared in twelve seasons between 1988 and 2008, his roles included his first Don José (Carmen), Werther (Werther) and Turridu (Cavalleria rusticana).

He sang over 175 performances at The Metropolitan Opera where he made his debut in 1989 as Rodolfo. Other roles included Pinkerton in Madame Butterfly and Faust in Boito's Mefistofele. His last appearance at The Metropolitan Opera in 2012 in The Makropulos Affair.

He also appeared at the Lyric Opera of Chicago, the San Francisco Opera, Los Angeles Opera, and Houston.

On the international scene, he made a sensational debut in Berlin, as Raoul in Les Huguenots, in 1987, and has since appeared at the Paris Opera, the Royal Opera House in London, La Scala in Milan, etc.

Leech established himself as one of the world's leading tenors in lyric roles such as Edgardo, Duke of Mantua, Alfredo, Faust, Roméo, Hoffmann, des Grieux, Werther, Pinkerton, et al. Possessing a beautiful clear voice with a thrilling upper register, was compared to Jussi Björling and Luciano Pavarotti by critics.

In 2015 he began a new affiliation with Michigan Opera Theatre as Director of Resident Artist Programs.

In 2023 he was appointed an associate professor of voice and opera at George Mason University

== Sources ==
- Le guide de l'opéra, Mancini & Rouveroux, (Fayard, 1996), ISBN 2-213-59567-4
