= Maria Farneti =

Italian opera singer

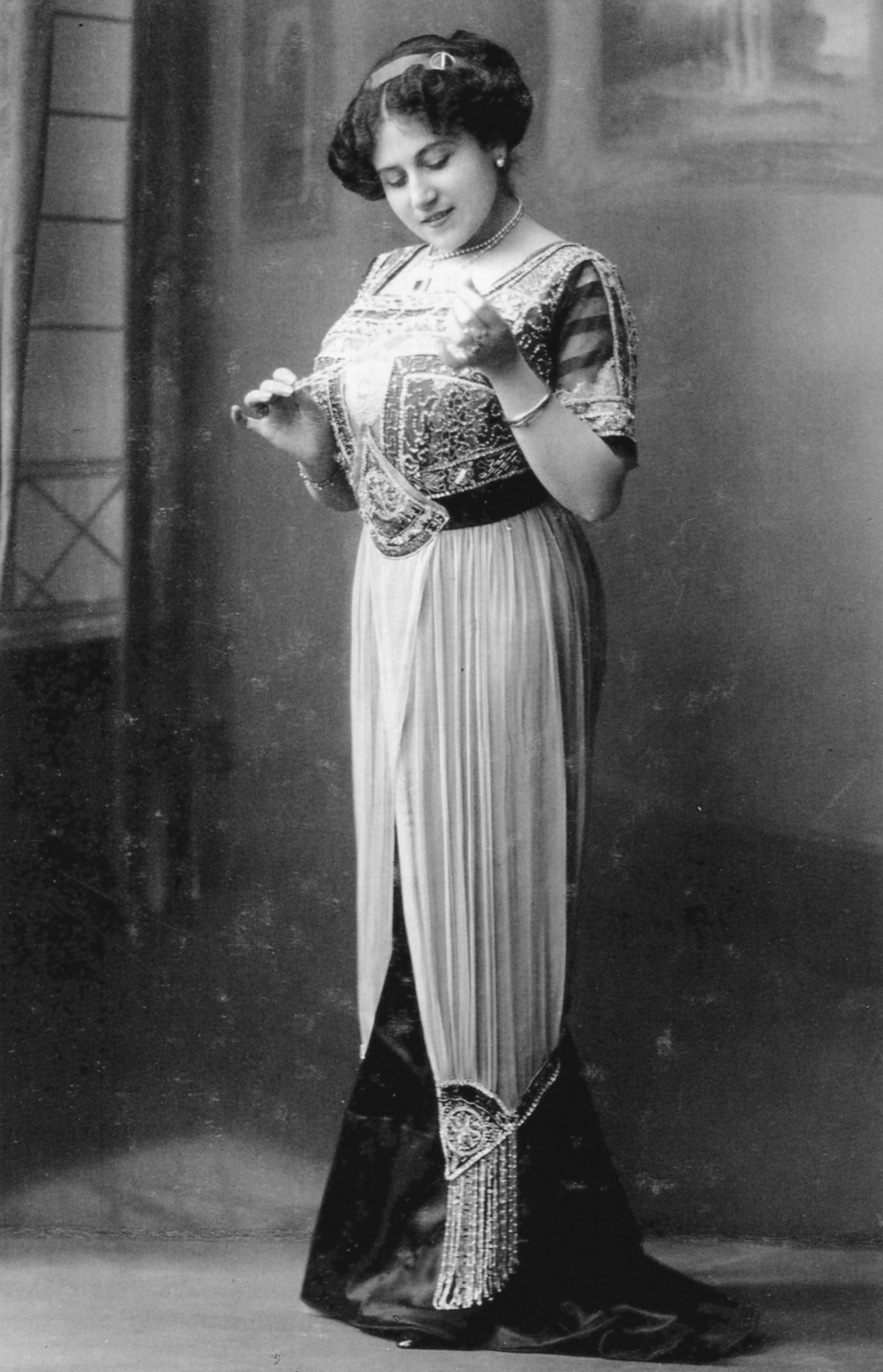
Maria Farneti-Album Farneti 508-94

Maria Farneti (8 December 1877 – 17 October 1955) was an Italian lyric soprano singer.

== Early life ==
Maria Farneti was born at Forlì, the daughter of Domenico Farneti and Clementina Babini. She studied voice with Virginia Boccabadati, at the Liceo Rossini in Pesaro.

== Career ==
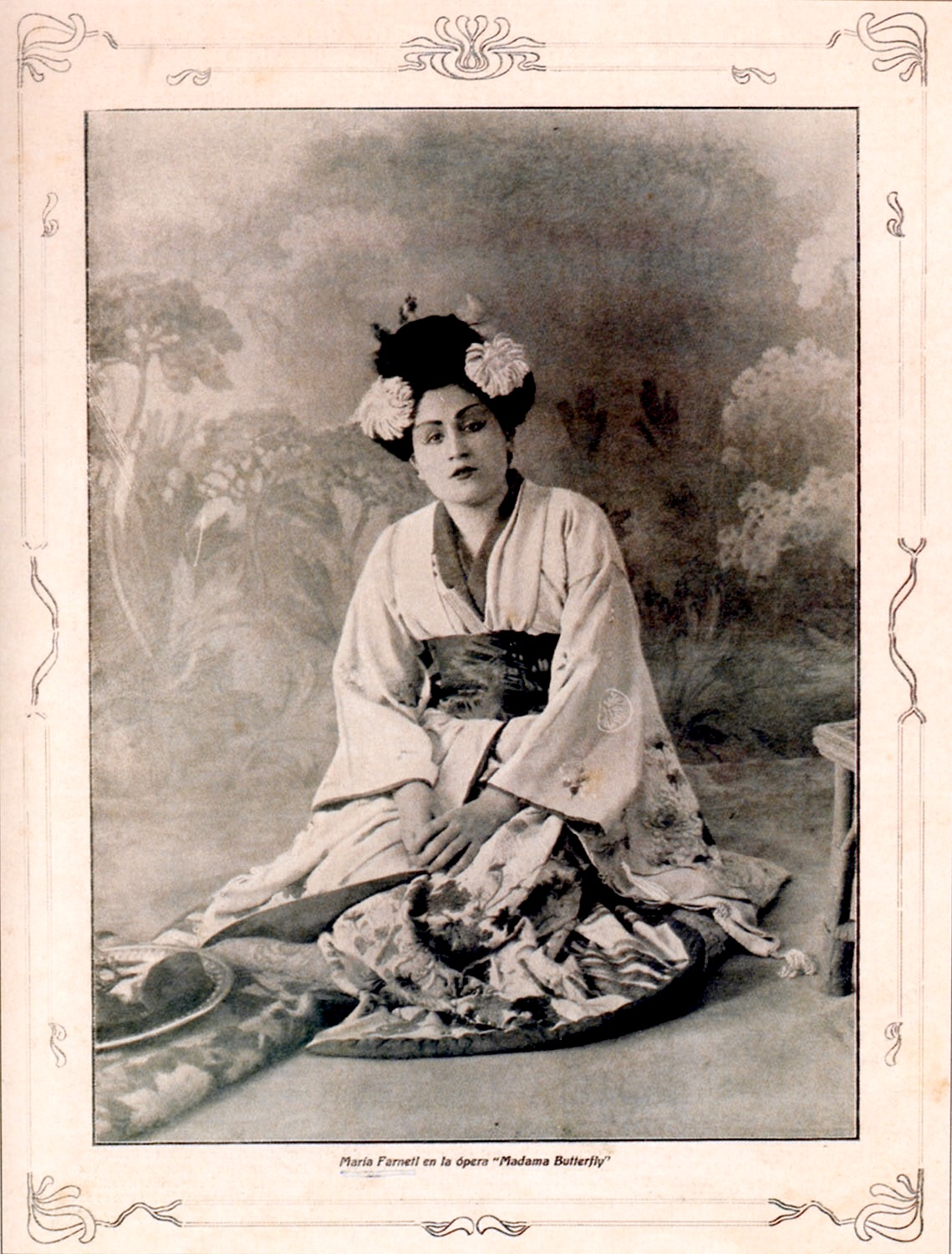
Maria Farneti in costume for Madama Butterfly, 1907

Farneti, "said to be the greatest beauty on the Italian stage", made her official debut in 1899, as Mimi in La bohème in Sansepolcro. In 1900 she sang at Bologna with Enrico Caruso. In 1902 she made her North American debut and sang in Pietro Mascagni's Iris in New York. In 1906 she gave her interpretation of Cio-Cio-San in Madama Butterfly in Rome and Naples, and she was well-reviewed in Ariane in 1908. She sang on tours of South America, at theatres in Buenos Aires, Montevideo and Rio de Janeiro, in 1911 and 1913. She was the first to sing the title role of Mascagni's Isabeau. Her last stage role was in Puccini's La Rondine in 1917.

She made recordings in 1910 (for Edison), 1914-1917 (for Fonotipia Records), and 1930-1931 (for Columbia). In 1922 she coached Irish soprano Margaret Burke Sheridan for a performance of Madama Butterfly.

== Personal life ==
Farneti married a lawyer, Luigi Riboldi, in 1917, and spent her retirement in a villa on Lake Como. The Riboldis were friends with Arturo Toscanini and his wife, into the 1940s. Maria Farneti died in 1955, aged 78 years. There is a street named for her in Forlì, and another in São Paulo, Brazil. In 2015, there was a musical commemoration in Forlì to mark sixty years since her death.
