= Pier Miranda Ferraro =

Italian opera singer (1924–2008)

Pier Miranda Ferraro (photo with 1957 dedication)

Pier Miranda Ferraro (30 October 1924 – 18 January 2008) was an Italian operatic tenor who had an active international opera career from 1951 through 1981. He particularly excelled in the dramatic Italian repertoire, with his signature role being the title role in Giuseppe Verdi's opera Otello. Other important roles in his performance repertoire included Radames in Verdi's Aida, Alvaro in La Forza del Destino, and des Grieux in Giacomo Puccini's Manon Lescaut. He also found success in the German repertoire portraying Wagnerian heroes. Although he was a gifted singer and had a highly impressive list of performance credits, he never achieved the international recognition enjoyed by his most important contemporaries, such as Franco Corelli or Mario Del Monaco. After retiring from the opera stage in 1981, he took up a second highly successful career as a voice teacher.

== Biography ==
Pier Miranda Ferraro

Born Pietro Ferraro in Altivole, Ferraro took his stage name from his wife's first name. He was trained by Mirko Bonomi at the Conservatorio Benedetto Marcello in Venice and by Aureliano Pertile at the Conservatorio Giuseppe Verdi in Milan. He made his professional opera debut as Rodolfo in Giacomo Puccini's La Bohème at the Teatro Nuovo in Milan in 1951. That same year, he began performing at La Scala, where he sang often through 1972. His first major triumph at that house was as Achille in Christoph Willibald Gluck's Iphigénie en Aulide in 1959.

Ferraro became a regular presence at Italy's most important houses during the 1950s through the 1970s, appearing at the Teatro dell'Opera di Roma, Teatro Comunale di Bologna, Teatro Carlo Felice, Teatro di San Carlo, Teatro Regio di Parma, Teatro Massimo, Teatro Comunale Giuseppe Verdi, Teatro Regio di Torino, and La Fenice. He also appeared at the opera festival at the Baths of Caracalla in Rome and at the Maggio Musicale Fiorentino opera festival. In addition to regularly appearing in Italy's principal opera houses, Ferraro also performed in important houses throughout Europe, including the Royal Opera at Covent Garden, the Liceu, the Teatro Nacional de São Carlos, La Monnaie, the Opéra National de Lyon, the Opéra de Marseille, the Opéra National de Paris, the Grand Théâtre de Genève, the Zurich Opera, the Hamburg State Opera, the Staatstheater Stuttgart, and the Vienna State Opera among others. He also made appearances at the Aix-en-Provence and Aldeburgh Festivals.

Although most of his performances were in Europe, Ferraro did make a handful of appearances in North and South America. He notably portrayed Cavaradossi and Manrico at the New York City Opera in 1956 and starred in productions of Don Carlo, La forza del destino and Il trovatore at the San Francisco Opera in 1958. In 1959, Ferraro sang the role of Gualtiero of Vincenzo Bellini’s Il pirata with Maria Callas as Imogene in a concert version presented by the American Opera Society at Carnegie Hall. That performance, long prized by collectors, was "officially”" released on CD by EMI in 1997. That same year, Ferraro recorded the role of Enzo in La Gioconda opposite Callas in the title role. His other appearances in the Americas included performances at the Philadelphia Lyric Opera Company, Cincinnati Opera, and the Teatro Colón. Ferraro was particularly admired for his interpretation of the title role in Giuseppe Verdi's opera Otello, which he first sang at San Remo in 1964 and sang for his final opera performance at Lecco in 1981. All told he portrayed Otello over 300 times during his long career.

Ferraro retired from the opera stage in 1981 after a biking accident caused injuries which inhibited his ability to move freely. He began a second career as a voice teacher, and he eventually became the head of the vocal department at the Milan Conservatory, a position he held for fifteen years. He later taught at the Accademia Viotti in Vercelli and the Accademia Internazionale Katia Ricciarelli in Mantua. He also taught masterclasses for five years at the Grand Festival in Lanciano, where in 1999 he directed a production of Madama Butterfly. Ferraro also gave masterclasses in cities throughout the world, including teaching in Beijing and Tokyo. He also worked as a judge at several international singing competitions, and shortly before his death, founded the Accademia Lirica Italiana. He was also honoured with the Commendatore and Grand’Ufficiale by the Italian government.

In 1985, Ferraro started a managing agency for individuals in the opera business; the company was later co-run by his daughter. Ferraro had four children in total. He died in Milan.

== Recordings ==
Ferraro made very few commercial recordings; the two he made with Callas are the most important in his career. However, Ferraro did appear on the Italian radio a number of times with a particularly important performance of Otello being broadcast from the Doge's Palace in Venice in August 1970. His artistry has also been preserved in a number of privately released performances of several operas, including performances of the title role in Pietro Mascagni’s Guglielmo Ratcliff and Folco in Mascagni's Isabeau.
