= Mélophone =

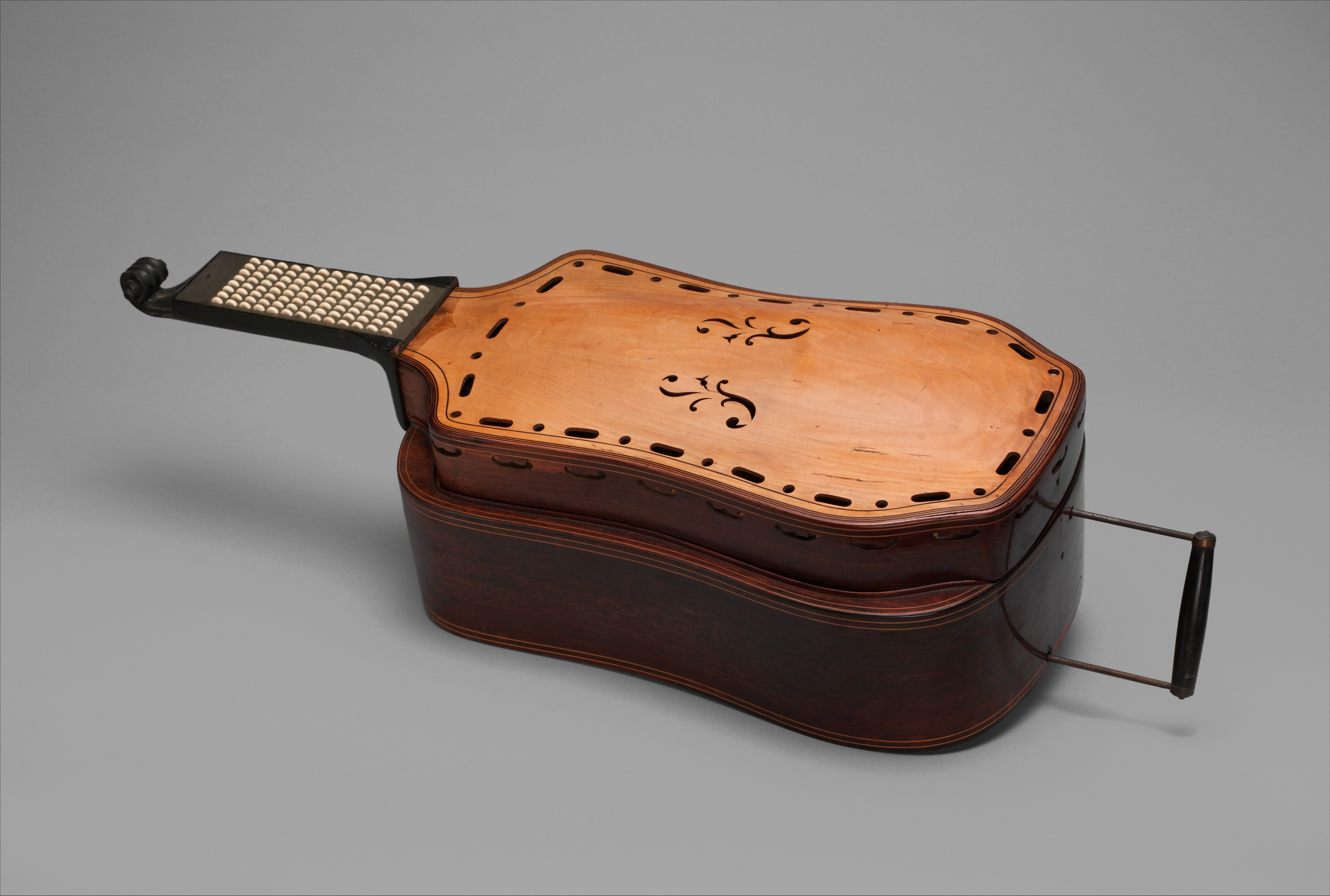
A mélophone with its lid on from the collection of the Metropolitan Museum of Art

The mélophone is a portable free reed instrument first constructed by Parisian watchmaker Pierre Charles Leclerc in 1837. After persuasion from Leclerc, composer Fromental Halévy included the instrument in his 1838 opera, Guido et Ginevra and briefly popularized the instrument. However, by 1855, the novelty had worn off and the instrument faded into relative obscurity.
