= Louis Dorus =

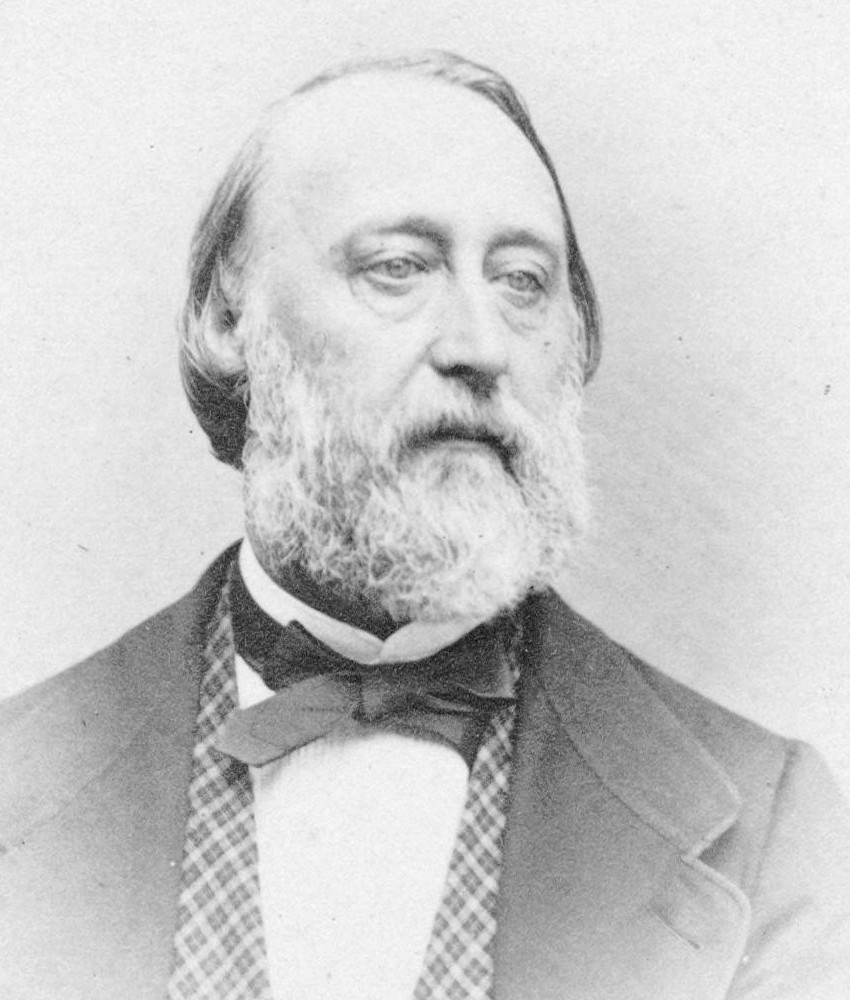
- Louis_Dorus in 1864
- Born: Vincent-Joseph van Steenkiste; 1 March 1812; Valenciennes
- Died: 9 June 1896 (aged 84); Étretat
- Occupation: Flautist at the Conservatoire de Paris

Louis Dorus (born Vincent Joseph van Steenkiste; 1 March 1812 – 9 June 1896) was a 19th-century French classical flautist. Vincent-Joseph van Steenkiste, his real name, was instrumental in the adoption of the modern concert flute. He is the younger brother of Julie Dorus-Gras, the father of the singer and pianist Juliette Vansteenkiste called Dorus, known after her marriage as Rabaud-Dorus, and Henri Rabaud's grandfather.

== Family and training ==
The birth name of Louis Dorus is Vincent Joseph van Steenkiste called Dorus. Dorus has been the nickname of the family since the 18th century, probably since the arrival of his great-great-grandfather Theodorus in Valenciennes. In 1705 he was a knave-worker (role of capitations) and came from Kortrijk. He is at the origin of all the bearers of the name in the Valenciennois. His family has no ties with another bourgeois family Van Steenkiste, originally from Thielt.

Vincent Joseph van Steenkiste was born 1 March 1812 in Valenciennes. His mother, Catherine Lionnois, was born in Nancy on 15 May 1772. Vincent Joseph's father, Aimé Joseph Ghislain van Steenkiste, born 21 June 1772 in Valenciennes, was a former lieutenant in the Grande Armée, reconverted into trade and conductor of an orchestra at the Valenciennes theater. His grandfather Jean François Joseph was a painter, his great-grandfather François Joseph was master mulquinier in Valenciennes. Vincent-Joseph quickly became interested in music, which he learned with his father. He went to study at the Paris Conservatory where he obtained the first prize in 1828.

Dorus married 8 March 1836 in the 11th arrondissement of Paris with a daughter of painter Jean-Baptiste Singry (Notre Dame de Nancy, 1 March 1782 - Paris 1824), Émilie (born 11 August 1813 in Paris, died 19 September 1897 in Étretat). Three children resulted from this marriage. His daughter Juliette married religiously on 24 October 1867 in Saint-Roch, Paris with Hippolyte Rabaud, a cellist at the conservatoire de Paris.

== Career ==
From 1828 to 1830, Dorus played at the Théâtre des Variétés. During these years, he gave concerts, and impressed those who listened to him, as testified by the newspapers of the time devoted to music: Le Ménestrel praised "The flute solo executed with so much taste and perfection by Mr. Dorus, has earned this young artist the applause of the whole venue".

From 1835 to 1866, Dorus was a solo flautist at the Orchestre de la Société des concerts du Conservatoire of Paris and succeeded Jean-Louis Tulou, at the Conservatoire in 1860. This coincided with the fiercely debated adoption of the modern 1847 Boehm flute. Dorus had been leading the adoption of this instrument, performing on the inventor Boehm's designs from the 1830s. He was the origin of the "Dorus key" along with Louis Lot, and this retrograde improvement was added to the Boehm design first by Lot and then the other key makers of the time. At the height of his musical career, he was awarded the Légion d'honneur by Marshall Vaillant in the name of Emperor Napoléon III. This distinction (by virtue of the Code of March 16, 1852, which repeated the code of Napoleon I granting nobility to the Chevaliers of the Legion of Honor, abrogated by the Second Republic and restored by Napoleon III) gave Louis Dorus the title of Imperial Knight. This title was transmitted to his heirs, in particular the Rabaud.

In addition, Louis Dorus was a Freemason.

== End of life ==
Louis Dorus retired with his fortune in 1868. He was domiciled in Paris on the Rue de Copenhague and then in the Rue de Londres. He often went on holiday in Étretat, where he died on 9 June 1896. A street in the city bears his name.

== Friends and acquaintances ==
Louis Dorus and his elder sister Julie Dorus-Gras mostly rubbed shoulders with musicians: Hector Berlioz, Giuseppe Verdi, Fromental Halévy and Giacomo Meyerbeer, for whom Julie Dorus-Gras played the role of Alice in Robert le diable. Vincent van Steenkiste witnessed the death of his brother-in-law Simon Victor Gras, first violinist at the Paris Opera in Étretat on 4 July 1876 and the birth of his grandson Henri Rabaud.

== See also ==
- Julie Dorus-Gras
- Henri Rabaud
- Paul Taffanel

== Bibliography ==
- Giannini, Tula (1993). Great Flute Makers of France: The Lot and Godfroy families, 1650–1900. Tony Bingham. ISBN 978-0946113057.
