= Virginia Boccabadati =

Italian opera soprano (1828–1922)

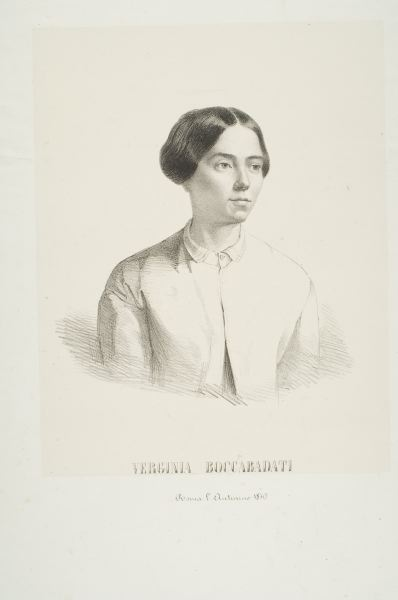
Virginia Boccabadati

Virginia Gazzuoli (29 April 1828 – 6 August 1922), better known by her stage name Virginia Boccabadati, was an Italian soprano.

== Early life ==
Daughter of Luigia Boccabadati, a famous singer and voice teacher in Modena, she studied and apprenticed with her mother from a young age, making a brilliant debut in Palermo in 1847 as the protagonist in Donizetti's Linda di Chamounix.

She married very young to Count Carignani and together with her husband, participated in the Five Days of Milan in 1848, regarding which there is also testimony of an episode in which she brought her carriage to reinforce a barricade.

== Career ==
The political events of the era kept her away from the stage for nearly three years, until 1850, when she returned to sing at the Teatro della Pergola in Florence, in Verdi's I masnadieri. She then often performed alongside her brother-in-law, the baritone Felice Varesi, the first interpreter of Rigoletto. In her career, one can count her performances in Rigoletto itself and especially in La traviata, for which Verdi himself had even proposed her to the management of the Teatro La Fenice as one of the ideal candidates for the role of Violetta in the opera's première. Later, however, in a confession, the singer admitted that she preferred the operas of Bellini and Donizetti to those of Verdi.

Having established herself primarily in the lyric-light repertoire, Boccabadati was also able to hold her own in more demanding roles thanks to her dramatic temperament.

After an accident weakened her voice, she intensified her teaching activities and, after her husband's death, accepted the position of singing instructor offered to her by Carlo Pedrotti at the Liceo Musicale of Pesaro. There, in 1893, she published, with the local Federici printing house, her Practical Observations for the Study of Singing, "a simple but precious booklet, in which one finds some memories of her mother's singing method and of Donizetti's friendship with her family". Among her students were Celestina Boninsegna and Maria Farneti, a very well-known Mascagni soprano from the beginning of the 20th century.

== Later life and death ==
In old age, she retired to the Royal Home for Widows and Unmarried Women of Respectable Condition in Turin, where she died at the age of 94 in 1922.
