= Prosper Dérivis =

French operatic bass (1808–1880)

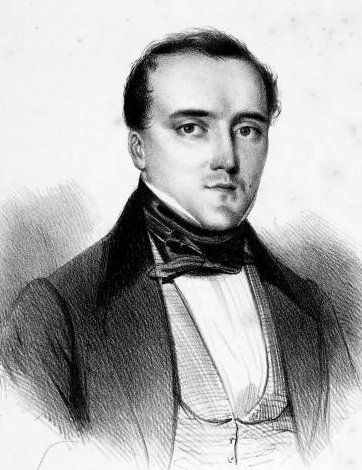
Prosper Dérivis

Nicolas-Prosper Dérivis (28 October 1808 – 11 February 1880) was a French operatic bass. He possessed a rich deep voice that had a great carrying power. While he could easily assail heavy dramatic roles, he was also capable of executing difficult coloratura passages and performing more lyrical parts. Along with Nicolas Levasseur, he was one of the greatest French basses of his generation.

== Life and career ==
Born in Paris, Dérivis was the son of operatic bass Henri-Étienne Dérivis. He studied singing at the Conservatoire de Paris with Auguste Nourrit and Felice Pellegrini. He made his professional debut at the Paris Opera in 1831 as Pharaon in Gioachino Rossini's Moïse et Pharaon. He remained committed to that opera house for the next ten years, notably performing in the world premieres of Fromental Halévy's La tentation (1832), Daniel Auber's Le serment (1832), Luigi Cherubini's Ali Baba (1833), Halevy's La Juive (1835, the Herald), Giacomo Meyerbeer's Les Huguenots (1836, the Comte de Nevers), Louis Niedermeyer's Stradella (1837), Halevy's Guido et Ginevra (1838, the Duke of Ferrara), Hector Berlioz's Benvenuto Cellini (1838, Balducci), Gaetano Donizetti's Les martyrs (1840, Félix), and Ambroise Thomas's Le comte de Carmagnola (1841). He was also heard successfully in Paris as Balthazar in Donizetti's La favorite and in the title roles of Wolfgang Amadeus Mozart's Don Giovanni and Rossini's Guillaume Tell.

In 1842-1843 Dérivis performed at La Scala in Milan where he notably created roles in the world premieres of two operas by Giuseppe Verdi: Zaccaria in Nabucco (1842) and Pagano/Hermit in I Lombardi alla prima crociata (1843). He also sang in the world premiere of Donizetti's Linda di Chamounix at the Theater am Kärntnertor in Vienna in 1842. In 1843-1844 he sang at the Teatro Regio di Parma as Bertram in Robert le diable, Duke Hamilton in Saverio Mercadante's Il reggente, and Filippo Visconti in Beatrice di Tenda. From 1845 to 1848 he was committed to the Théâtre-Italien in Paris. In 1846-1847 he was active at the Teatro Regio di Torino where he was heard as Alfonso D'Este in Donizetti's Lucrezia Borgia, Enrico Ashton in Donizetti's Lucia di Lammermoor, and Jefte in the world premiere of Giovanni Pacini's Ester d'Engaddi (1848) among other roles. In 1847 he appeared at La Scala as Dom Juam de Sylva in Donizetti's Dom Sébastien. He sang Zacharie in Meyerbeer's Le prophète in 1851. He performed at the Paris Opera again 1856–1857, notably singing d'Aminta in the world premiere of Emanuele Biletta's La rose de Florence and Ferrando in Verdi's Il trovatore.

After 1857 Dérivis' stage appearances became more rare. He performed at the Teatro Comunale di Bologna in 1862 where he was heard as Samuel in Un ballo in maschera, Sparafucile in Verdi's Rigoletto and as Calistene in Donizetti's Poliuto. One of his last performances was as Elmiro in Rossini's Otello in 1870 at La Scala. After slowing down his stage career he taught singing at the Conservatoire de Paris. He died in Paris in 1880 at the age of 71.
