= Isabeau =

Opera by Pietro Mascagni

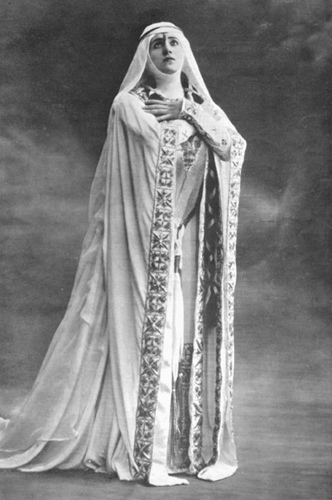
Maria Farneti in the title role of Isabeau, 1911

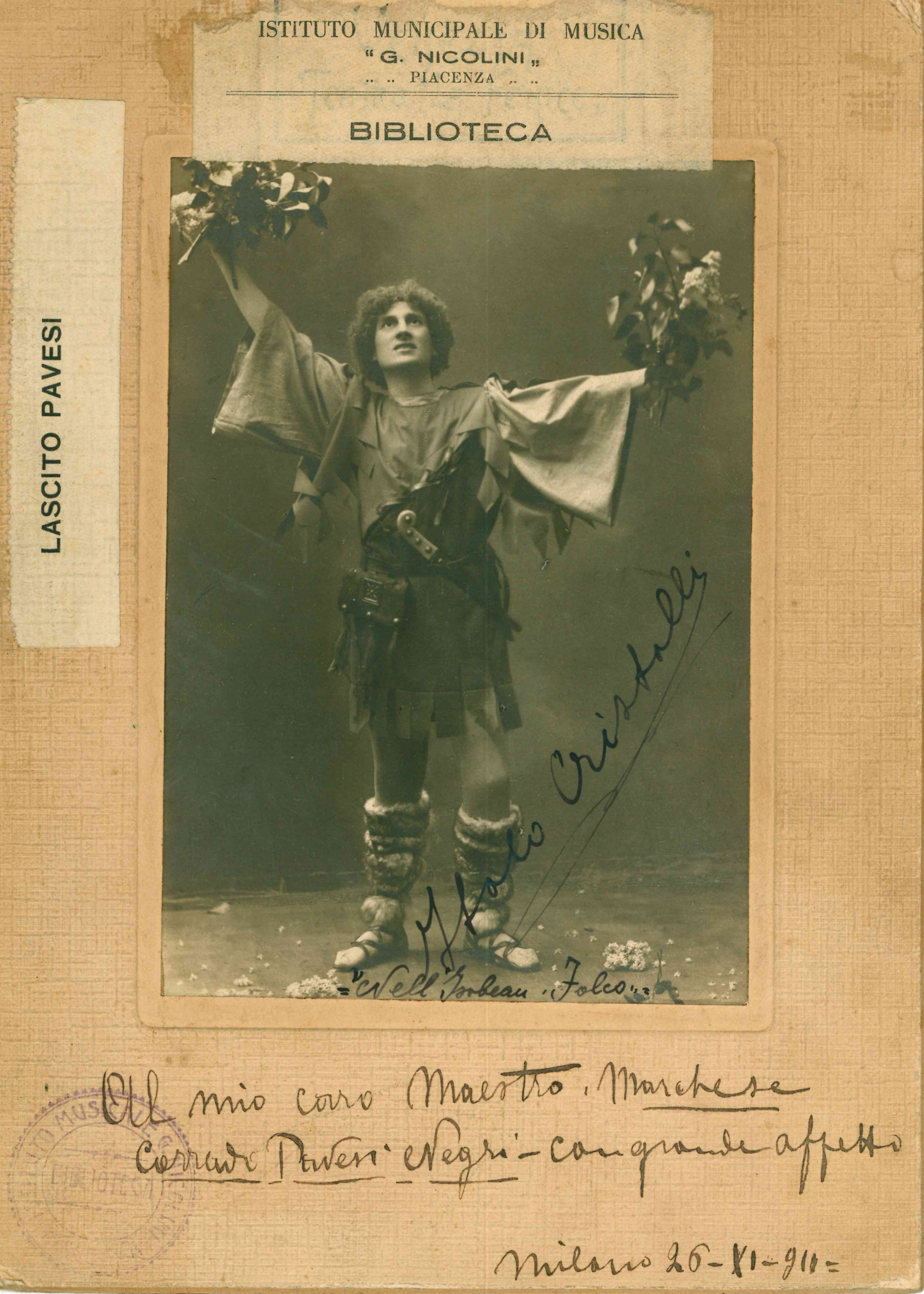
Italo Cristelli as Folco in Isabeau

Isabeau is a leggenda drammatica or opera in three parts by Pietro Mascagni, 1911, from an Italian libretto by Luigi Illica. Mascagni conducted its first performance on 2 June 1911 at the Teatro Coliseo, Buenos Aires.

A retelling of the medieval English legend of Lady Godiva, Mascagni described it in an interview as his attempt to "return to the romanticism which inspired so much of Italian opera."

== Roles ==
Roles, voice types, premiere cast
Role	Voice type	Premiere cast, 2 June 1911 Conductor: Mascagni
King Raimondo	baritone	Carlo Galeffi
Isabeau, his daughter	soprano	Maria Farneti
Cornelius, the king's minister	baritone	Giuseppe La Puma
Folco, a falconer	tenor	Antonio Saluda
Ermyntrude	soprano	Olga Simzis
Ermyngarde	soprano	Amalia Columbo
Giglietta	soprano	Maria Pozzi
il cavalier Faidit	baritone	Dentale Teofido
l'araldo maggiore	baritone	

== Synopsis ==
King Raimondo tries to find a husband for the princess Isabeau by holding a tournament, but she is unwilling to choose a husband. When the king forces her to ride naked through the city, the people refuse to look at her out of respect. Furthermore, they demand from the king an edict condemning to blindness anyone who dares to look at her. Unaware of the edict, the falconer Folco accidentally looks upon Isabeau during her ride and is arrested. When Isabeau visits him in prison, she falls in love with him and begs her father to pardon him. However, the king's minister stirs up the passions of the people who rise up in a vigilante mob and kill Folco. Isabeau kills herself over his dying body.

== Recordings ==
Year	Cast	Conductor and orchestra	Label
1962	Marcella Pobbe, Rinaldo Rola, Pier Miranda Ferraro	Tullio Serafin; Orchestra Sinfonica di Sanremo	Warner Fonit; Cetra Opera Collection 5050467-1045-2-5
