= Maria Flécheux =

French operatic singer

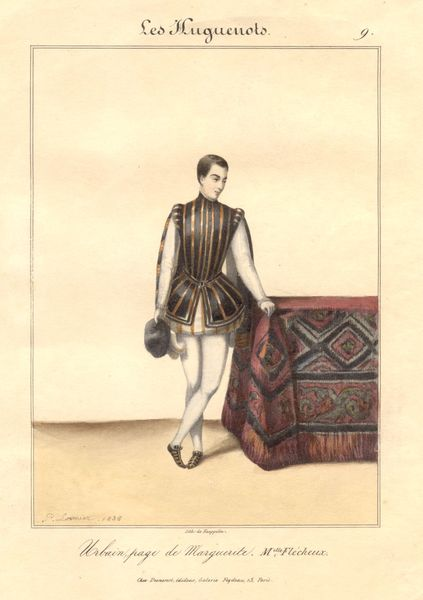
Maria Flécheux as Urbain in the first production of Les Huguenots

Maria Flécheux (1 August 1813, in Rouen – 20 September 1842, in Paris) was a French operatic soprano. She is most notable for creating the role of the page Urbain in Meyerbeer's Les Huguenots in 1836.

== Career ==
Flécheux began her career in her native Rouen, singing in the secondary theatre in that city. In 1834 she gave two solo concerts there which led to engagements in Paris. In 1835 she sang the role of Alice in Meyerbeer's Robert le diable at the Paris Opera, with great success. She was chosen to create the role of the pageboy Urbain in Meyerbeer's Les Huguenots the following year. Flécheux was praised for her fresh voice, endearing stage presence and clear timbre. She also sang at theatres in Belgium, before dying of tuberculosis aged 29.
