= Les Huguenots =

French opera by Giacomo Meyerbeer

- Grand opéra by Giacomo Meyerbeer
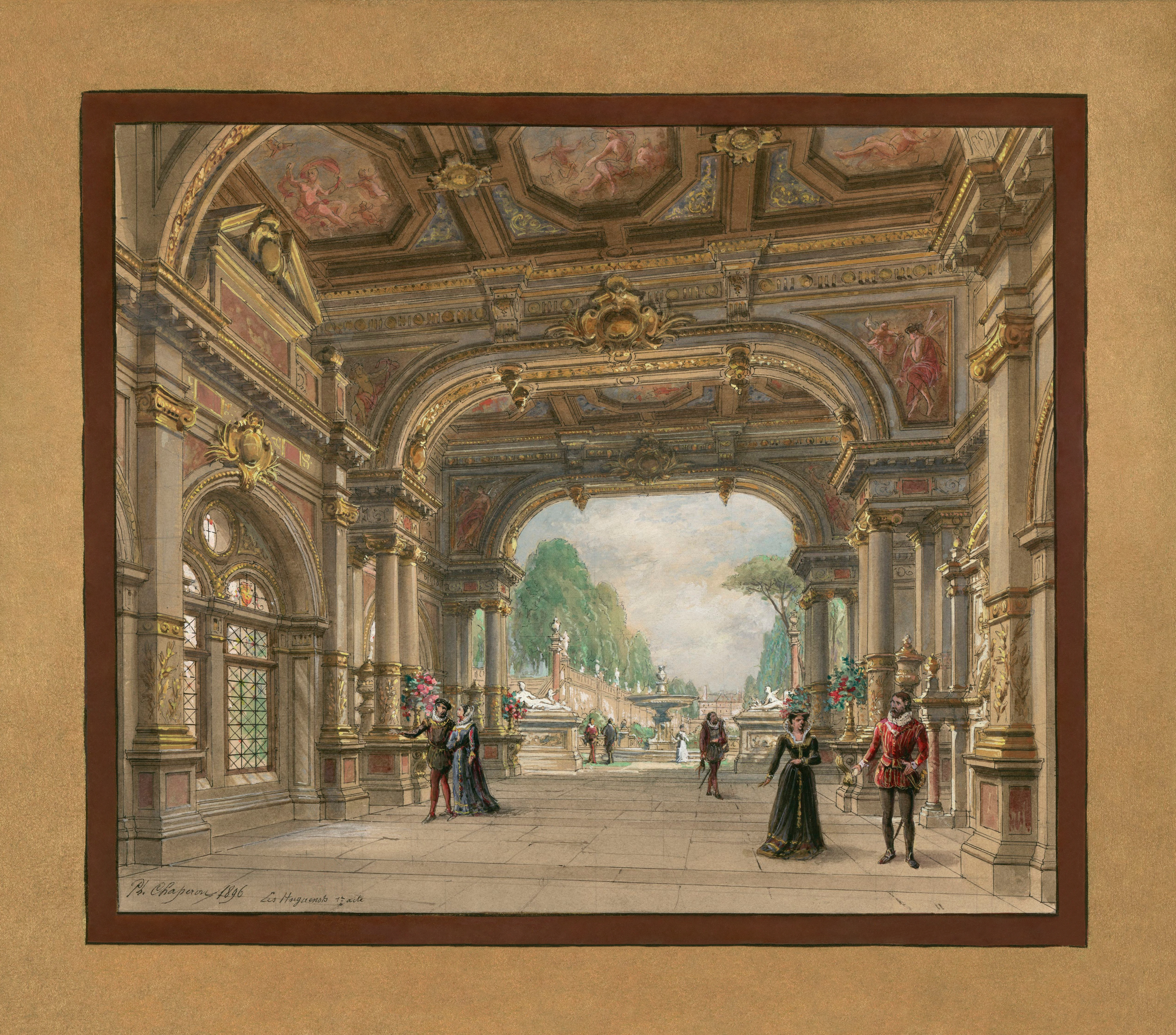
- Set design by Philippe Chaperon for Act 1 of the 1897 production at the Palais Garnier
- Librettist: Eugène Scribe; Émile Deschamps
- Language: French
- Premiere: 29 February 1836; Paris Opéra

Les Huguenots (French pronunciation: [le ˈyg(ə)no]) is an opera by Giacomo Meyerbeer and is one of the most popular and spectacular examples of grand opera. In five acts, to a libretto by Eugène Scribe and Émile Deschamps, it premiered in Paris on 29 February 1836.

== Composition history ==
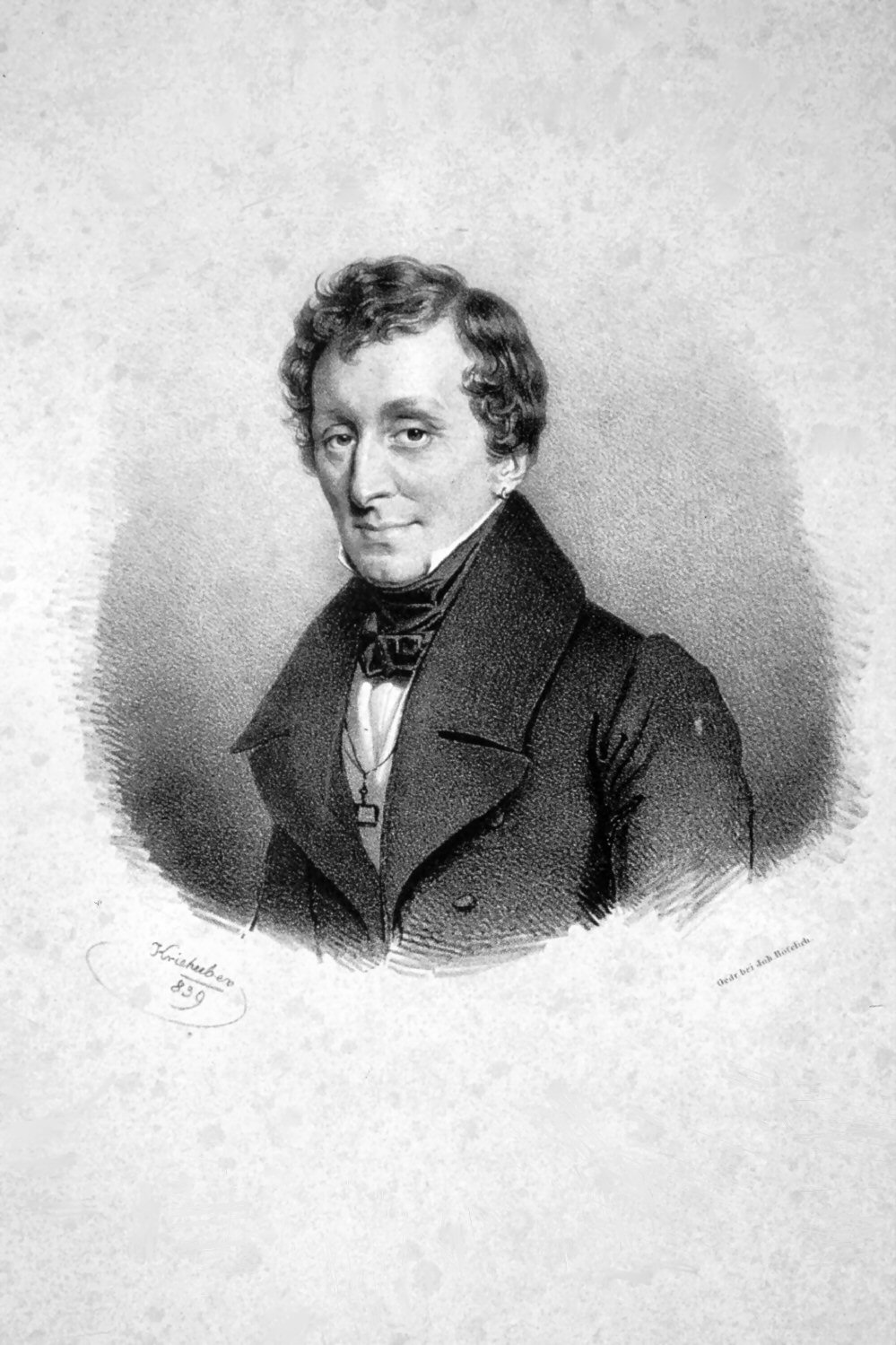
Giacomo Meyerbeer, portrayed in 1839

Les Huguenots was some five years in creation. Meyerbeer prepared carefully for this opera after the sensational success of Robert le diable, recognising the need to continue to present lavish staging, a highly dramatic storyline, impressive orchestration and virtuoso parts for the soloists – the essential elements of the new genre of Grand Opera. Meyerbeer and his librettist for Robert le Diable, Eugène Scribe, had agreed to collaborate on an epic work concerning the French Wars of Religion, with a drama partly based on Prosper Mérimée's 1829 novel A Chronicle of the Reign of Charles IX. Coming from a wealthy family, Meyerbeer could afford to take his time, dictate his own terms, and to be a perfectionist. The very detailed contract which Meyerbeer arranged with Louis-Désiré Véron, director of the Opéra, for Les Huguenots (and which was drawn up for him by the lawyer Adolphe Crémieux) is a testament to this. While Meyerbeer was writing the opera, another opera with a similar setting and theme (Le pré aux clercs by Ferdinand Hérold) was also produced in Paris (1832). Like Meyerbeer's, Hérold's work was extremely popular in its time, although it is now only seldom performed.

Meyerbeer decided that he wanted more historical details of the period and a greater psychological depth to the characters than Scribe's text was supplying so he obtained Scribe's approval to invite a second librettist, Émile Deschamps, to collaborate on the text in order to furnish these elements. Meyerbeer was recommended to take his wife to a warmer climate for her health, and while in Italy for that purpose he consulted with the librettist of his earlier Italian operas, Gaetano Rossi. With his advice Meyerbeer himself re-wrote the part of Marcel, one of the most striking and original characters in the piece. Meyerbeer also accepted the advice of star tenor Adolphe Nourrit, chosen to create the part of Raoul, to expand the love duet in Act 4, which became one of the most famous numbers in the opera.

== Performance history ==
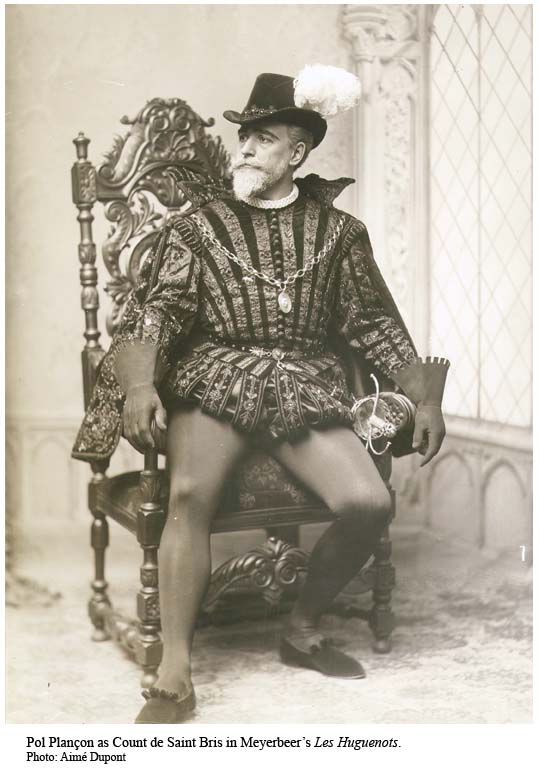
Pol Plançon as the Comte de St. Bris in 1894 at the Metropolitan Opera house

Les Huguenots was premiered by the Paris Opera at the Salle Le Peletier on 29 February 1836 (conductor: François Habeneck), and was an immediate success. Both Adolphe Nourrit and Cornélie Falcon were particularly praised by the critics for their singing and performances. It was indeed Falcon's last important creation before her voice so tragically failed in April of the following year. Hector Berlioz called the score "a musical encyclopedia". Les Huguenots was the first opera to be performed at the Opéra more than 1,000 times (the 1,000th performance being on 16 May 1906) and continued to be produced regularly up to 1936, more than a century after its premiere. (The Paris Opera opened a new production of Les Huguenots in September 2018, the first time since 1936 for the opera to be performed there). Its many performances in all other of the world's major opera houses give it a claim to being the most successful opera of the 19th century.

Other first performances included London (Covent Garden Theatre), 20 June 1842, and New Orleans (Théâtre d'Orléans) on 29 April 1839. Due to its subject matter it was sometimes staged under different titles such as The Guelfs and the Ghibellines (in Vienna before 1848), Renato di Croenwald in Rome, or The Anglicans and the Puritans (in Munich), to avoid inflaming religious tensions among its audiences.

Les Huguenots was chosen to open the present building of the Covent Garden Theatre in 1858. During the 1890s, when it was performed at the Metropolitan Opera, it was often called 'the night of the seven stars', as the cast would include Lillian Nordica, Nellie Melba, Sofia Scalchi, Jean de Reszke, Édouard de Reszke, Victor Maurel and Pol Plançon. The opera was performed in Italian at the Met in the 19th century as Gli Ugonotti.

=== Soviet adaptation ===
In the Soviet Union, the opera was given a new libretto as Dekabristy, about the historical Decembrists.

=== Modern revivals ===
As with Meyerbeer's other operas, Les Huguenots lost favor in the early part of the twentieth century and it fell out of the operatic repertoire worldwide, except for very occasional revivals. Dame Joan Sutherland and Richard Bonynge were the major force in the opera's revival during the second half of the 20th century. Sutherland chose the opera for her final performance at the Sydney Opera House on 2 October 1990, Bonynge conducting the Opera Australia Orchestra.

Amongst reasons often adduced for the dearth of productions in the 20th century were the scale of the work and the cost of mounting it, as well as the alleged lack of virtuoso singers capable of doing justice to Meyerbeer's demanding music. However, recent successful productions of the opera at relatively small centres such as Metz (2004) show that this conventional wisdom can be challenged. Since then, there have been highly successful new productions of Les Huguenots at major opera houses in France, Belgium, Germany and Switzerland. Performances of Les Huguenots are no longer rare in Europe.

== Roles ==
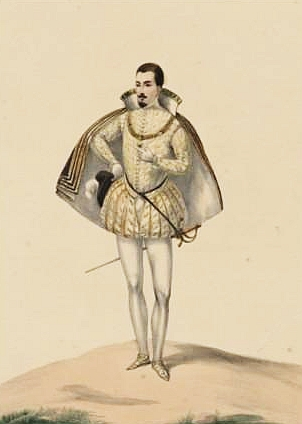
Prosper Dérivis as Nevers

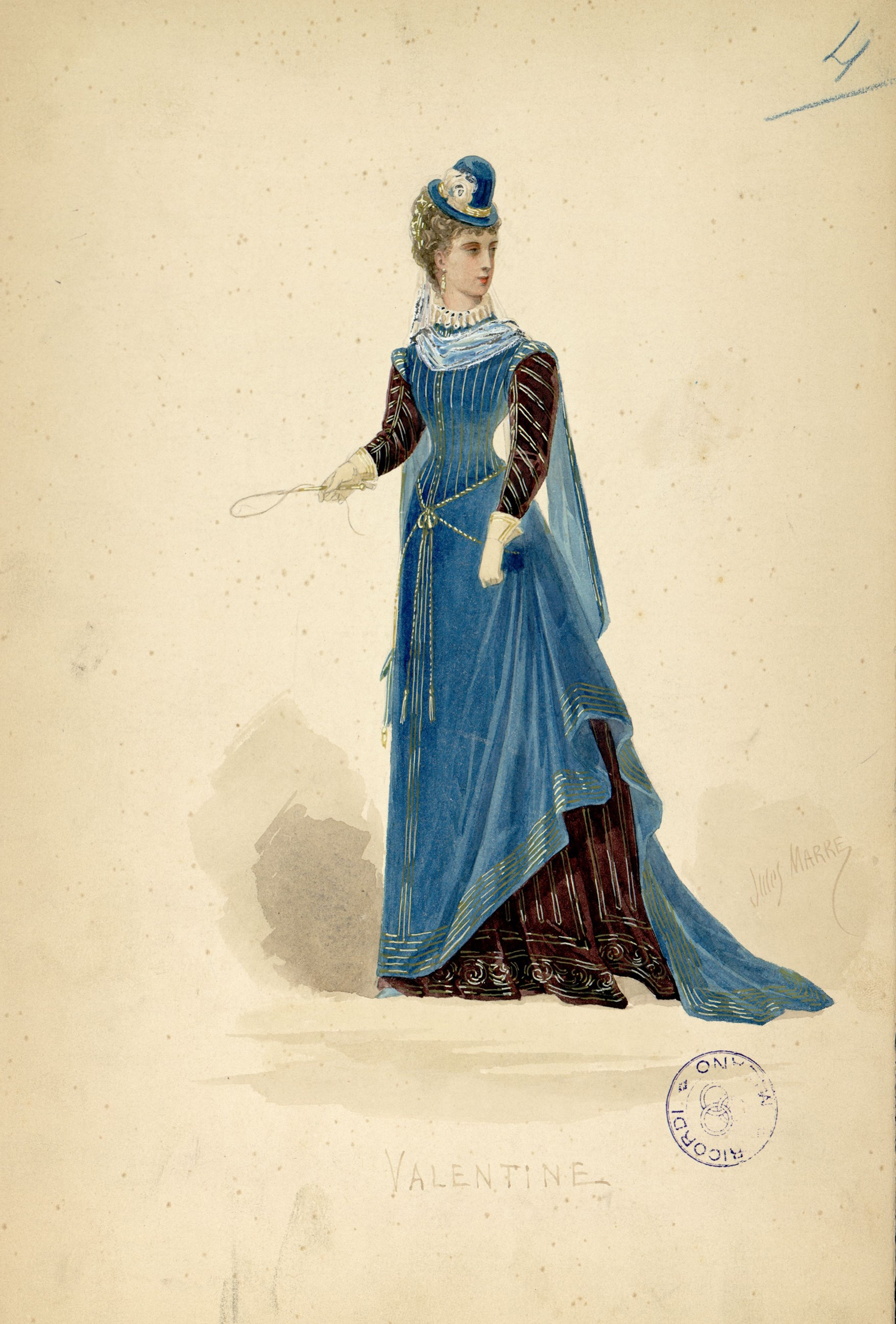
Valentine (soprano), costume design for Gli Ugonotti (undated).

Roles, voice types, and premiere cast
Role	Voice type	Premiere cast, 29 February 1836 (Conductor: François Habeneck)
Marguerite de Valois, Queen of Navarre	soprano	Julie Dorus-Gras
Valentine, daughter of Count de Saint-Bris	soprano	Cornélie Falcon
Urbain, the Queen's page	soprano	Maria Flécheux
Raoul de Nangis, a Protestant gentleman	tenor	Adolphe Nourrit
Marcel, a Huguenot soldier, Raoul's servant	bass	Nicolas Levasseur
Le Comte de Nevers, a Catholic gentleman	baritone	Prosper Dérivis
Le Comte de Saint-Bris, a Catholic gentleman	baritone	Jean-Jacques-Émile Serda
Bois-Rosé, a Huguenot soldier	tenor	François Wartel
Maurevert, a Catholic gentleman	baritone	Bernadet
Tavannes, a Catholic gentleman	tenor	Alexis Dupont
Cossé, a Catholic gentleman	tenor	Jean-Étienne-Auguste Massol
Thoré, a Catholic gentleman	tenor	François Wartel
De Retz, a Catholic gentleman	baritone	Alexandre Prévost
Méru, a Catholic gentleman	baritone	Ferdinand Prévôt
Léonard, valet of the Comte de Nevers	tenor	Charpentier
Town crier	bass	Adolphe-Joseph-Louis Alizard
Two Maids-of-Honor	soprano	Gosselin and Laurent
Chorus: Catholic and Huguenot ladies and gentlemen of the court, soldiers, pages, citizens, and populace; monks, students

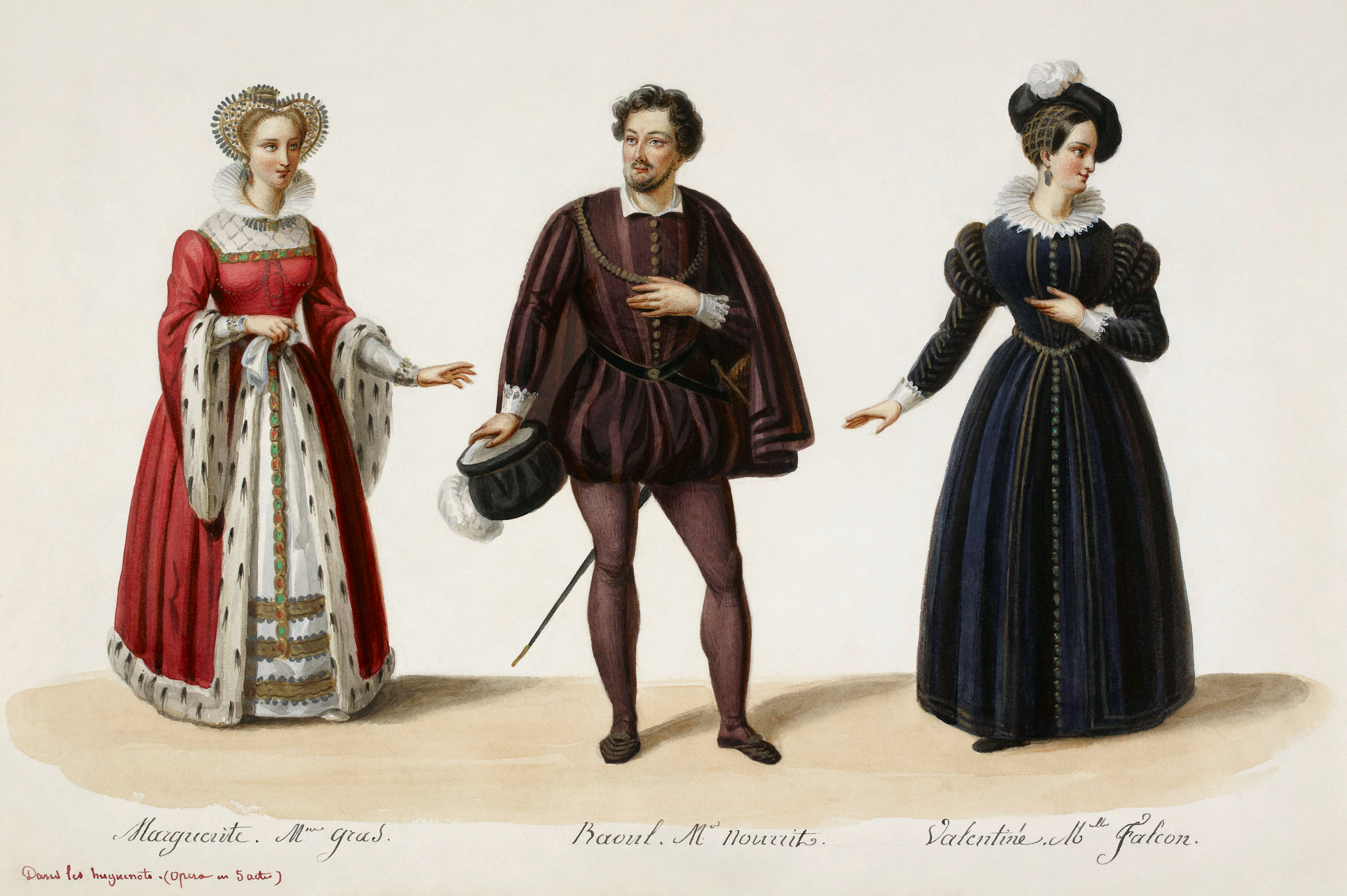
Costume designs by Eugène Du Faget for the 1836 première: Julie Dorus-Gras as Marguerite, Adolphe Nourrit as Raoul, and Cornélie Falcon as Valentine

== Synopsis ==
The story culminates in the historical St. Bartholomew's Day Massacre in 1572 in which thousands of French Huguenots (Protestants) were slaughtered by Catholics in an effort to rid France of Protestant influence. Although the massacre was a historical event, the rest of the action, which primarily concerns the love between the Catholic Valentine and the Protestant Raoul, is wholly a creation of Scribe.

A short orchestral prelude, featuring Martin Luther's chorale "Ein feste Burg", replaces the extended overture Meyerbeer originally intended for the opera.

=== Act 1 ===
The stage represents the chateau of the Count of Nevers, in Touraine. In the background, large open windows show gardens and a lawn, on which several lords play ball; on the right, a door leading into the inner apartments; at left, a window closed by a curtain and which is supposed to lead to a prayer room; at the front of the stage, other lords are playing dice, cup and ball, etc. Nevers, Tavannes, Cossé, Retz, Thoré, Méru and other Catholic lords look at them and talk to each other

The Catholic Count of Nevers is entertaining his fellow noblemen. Their host informs them that before they can go to dinner, they must await the arrival of Raoul, a young Huguenot sent to them from the King in an effort to reconcile Protestant and Catholic. Raoul enters, very impressed with the surroundings and to be in the company of the noblemen. Lavish dishes of food and copious supplies of wine are brought in and the nobles encourage Raoul to drink ( L’orgie: "Bonheur de la table"). The Count of Nevers announces that he has just become engaged and that he must now give up his mistresses. However, he invites his guests to describe the ones they are in love with and asks the latest arrival, Raoul de Nangis. Raoul then tells how he rescued a girl from an attack on her in the street. Although he does not know her name or her origins, he immediately fell in love (Romance: "Plus blanche que la blanche hermine"). (With a daring and unusual stroke of orchestration, Meyerbeer accompanies this aria with a solo viola d'amore). Raoul's Protestant servant Marcel enters and the old man is shocked to see his master in such wicked company enjoying games, drinking and tales of love. Marcel sings a hearty Protestant prayer (to the tune of 'Ein feste Burg') while the Catholic lords toast their mistresses. One of the Catholics recognises the old man from a battle they fought and asks him to have a drink with him to bury any grudge. Marcel refuses, and then, at the Catholics' request, he sings a Huguenot battle song from the siege of La Rochelle, calling for the extermination of Catholics (Chanson huguenote: "Piff, paff, piff, paff"). The Catholics are merely amused by this.

A valet of the Count of Nevers informs his master that a mysterious woman wishes to speak to him. The count goes out to meet the stranger. Catholic lords wonder about the identity of the unknown woman and try to see her. They invite Raoul to do the same. Recognizing the young woman he saved and fell in love with, the young Huguenot, believing she is one of the mistresses of the Count of Nevers he has been boasting about, swears never to see her again. In fact she is Nevers' intended bride, Valentine (daughter of St. Bris), instructed by the Queen to break off her engagement. The page Urbain enters with a secret message for Raoul, daring him to come blindfolded to a secret rendezvous with an unnamed woman ( Cavatina: "Une dame noble et sage"). The Catholics recognize the seal on the letter as belonging to the Queen of Navarre and drink to Raoul's health as he is led away.

=== Act 2 ===
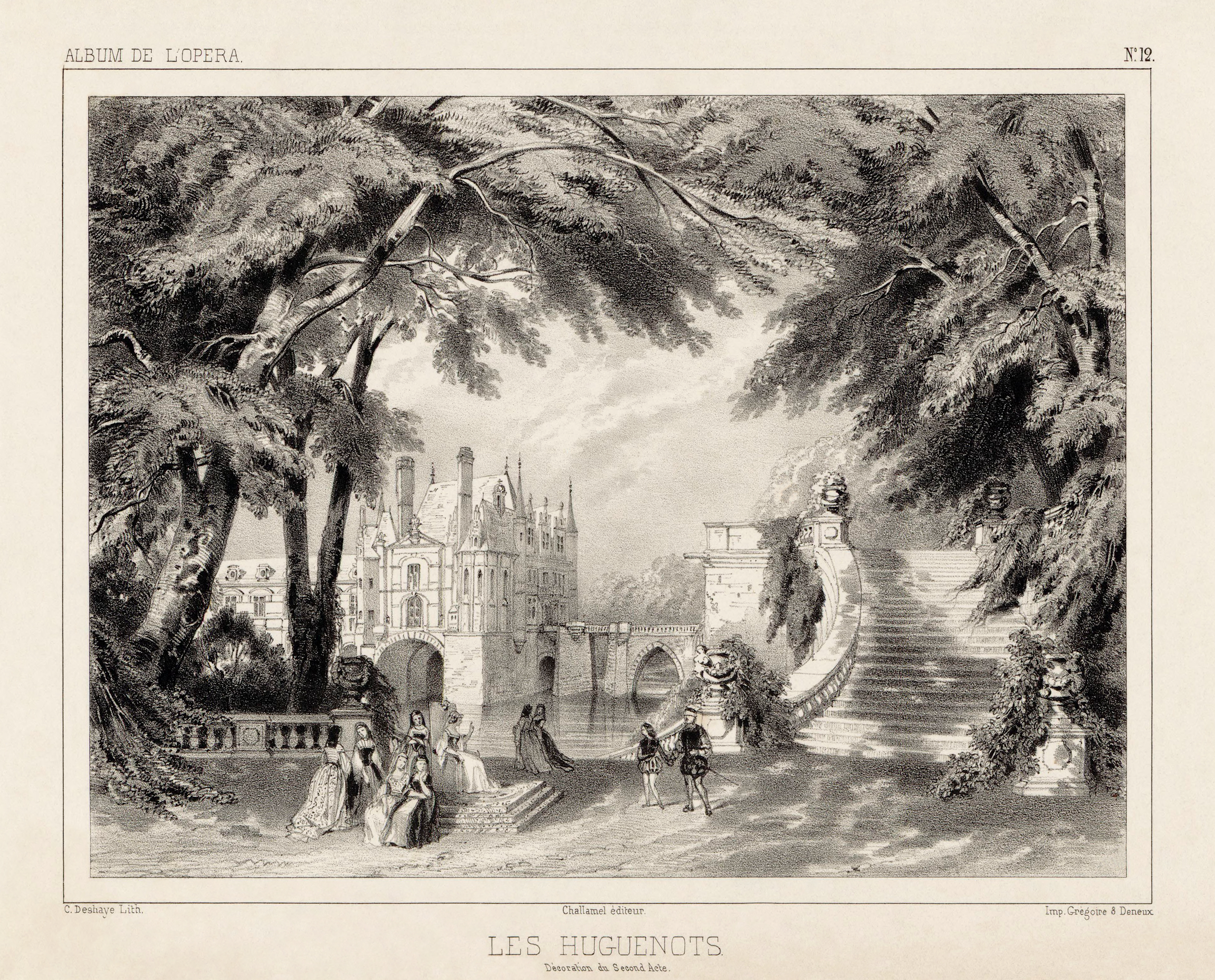
Press illustration of Act 2 of the 1836 premiere

The castle and gardens at the Château de Chenonceaux. The river meanders to the middle of the stage, disappearing from time to time behind clumps of green trees. On the right, a wide staircase by which we descend from the castle into the gardens.

Queen Marguerite looks into a mirror held by her enamoured page Urbain, and sings a virtuoso pastorale (O beau pays de la Touraine). She hopes to avoid the religious strife plaguing France by remaining in the beautiful countryside (Cabaletta: A ce mot seul s’anime et renaît la nature).Valentine enters and reports that Nevers has agreed to break the engagement, which delights Marguerite as, knowing that Valentine has fallen in love with Raoul de Nangis, she is sure that she will be able to persuade Valentine's father, the Catholic Saint-Bris, to allow his daughter to marry the young Protestant as a step towards ending sectarian strife. Marguerite's entourage of ladies enter dressed for bathing. This leads to a ballet during which the page Urbain attempts to spy on the scantily clad ladies as they frolic in the water. Urbain laughingly describes the journey of Raoul, blindfolded, to the castle (Rondeau: "Non, non, non, vous n’avez jamais, je gage") He enters and the Queen tells her ladies to leave him alone with her. With his sight restored, Raoul is amazed by the beauty of his surroundings as well as that of the young woman who stands before him, while she is tempted to try to keep the charming young man for herself rather than have him marry Valentine as she had planned (Duet: "Beauté divine enchanteresse").The lords and ladies of the court, including Nevers and Saint-Bris enter, and the Queen orders everyone to swear friendship and peace, which all aver, except for Marcel, who disapproves of his master mixing with Catholics (Oath:Par l’honneur, par le nom que portaient). The Queen presents Valentine to Raoul as the girl he loves and will marry to cement relations between the Protestant and Catholic factions. In a complex final ensemble, Raoul, who believes Valentine is the mistress of Nevers, refuses to comply with the Queen's command. The nobles then swear revenge, Valentine is devastated by this insult to her honour, the Queen does not understand Raoul's reason for rejecting the marriage and Marcel reproaches Raoul for consorting with Catholics.

=== Act 3 ===
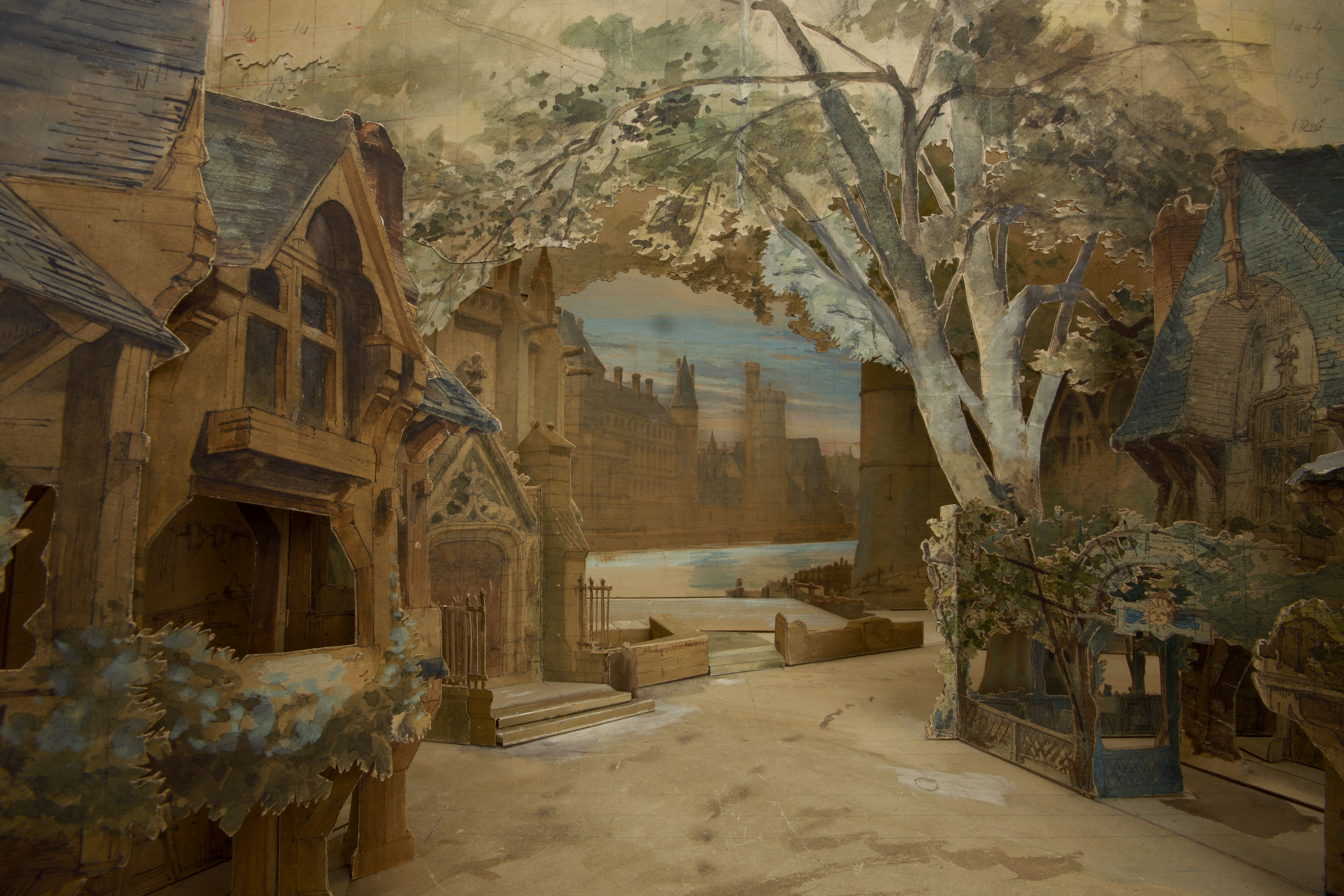
Model for the set by Charles-Antoine Cambon for Act 3 Paris 1875

Paris, the 'Pré aux clercs' on the left bank of the Seine, at sunset. On the left, a tavern where Catholic students sit with girls; on the right, another tavern in front of which Huguenot soldiers drink and play dice. In the background, on the left, the entrance to a chapel. In the middle, a huge tree shading the meadow. At the front of the stage, clerics from La Basoche and grisettes sit on chairs and chat between themselves. Others are walking around. Workers, merchants, traveling musicians, monks, and middle-class townspeople. It is six o'clock in the evening, in the month of August.

Citizens enjoy a stroll on a beautiful Sunday evening (Entracte et chœur: C’est le jour de dimanche). The Huguenot soldiers sing a blood-thirsty war song in praise of the Protestant Admiral Coligny (Couplets militaires: "Prenant son sabre de bataille"). A procession of Catholic girls crosses the scene on the way to the chapel where Valentine and Nevers are about to be married, chanting praise to the Virgin (Litanies :" Vierge Marie, soyez bénie !") Marcel enters with a letter from Raoul to Saint-Bris and interrupts the procession, seeking to know Saint-Bris's whereabouts. The Catholics are outraged by Marcel's sacrilege but the Huguenot soldiers defend him. Tension is rising when a band of gypsies enter, dancing and telling fortunes, and calm things down (Ronde bohémienne: "Venez ! – Vous qui voulez savoir d’avance" and gypsy dance). Valentine has just married Nevers, but remains in the chapel to pray. Marcel delivers a challenge from Raoul. Saint-Bris decides to kill Raoul, but is overheard by Valentine. The town crier declares curfew (the scene anticipating a similar one in Wagner's Die Meistersinger) and the crowds disperse. Valentine, in disguise, tells Marcel of the plot by her father and others to murder Raoul (Duet:Dans la nuit où seul je veille). Valentine realises that despite the public humiliation inflicted on her by Raoul she still loves him and returns to the chapel. Raoul, Saint-Bris and their witnesses arrive for the duel, each confident of success (Septet: "En mon bon droit j’ai confiance"). Marcel calls for assistance from the Huguenot soldiers in the tavern on the right and Saint-Bris to the Catholic students in the tavern on the left and a near-riot ensues. Only the arrival of the Queen, on horseback, stems the chaos. Raoul realises that Valentine has saved him and that his suspicions of her were unfounded. However, now she is married to his enemy and indeed at that moment an illuminated barge appears on the river with wedding guests serenading the newly wedded couple (Wedding chorus:"Au banquet où le ciel leur apprête"). Nevers leads her away in a splendid procession as Catholics and Protestants loudly proclaim their murderous hatred of each other (Chorus of fighters:"Non, plus de paix ni trêve").

=== Act 4 ===
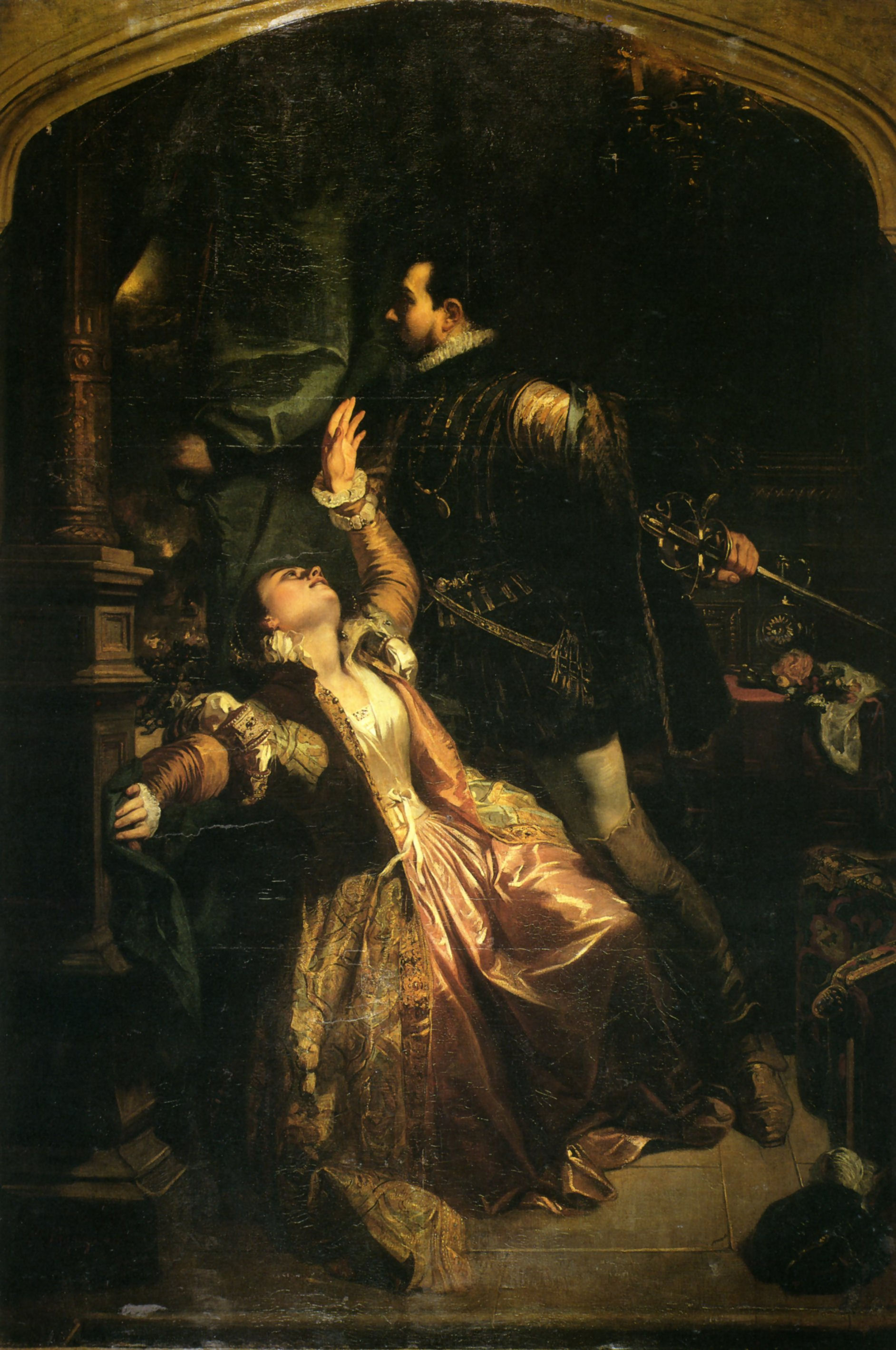
Painting of the Act 4 Raoul/ Valentine duet by Camille Roqueplan

A room in Nevers' Parisian town-house. Family portraits decorate the walls. In the background, a large door and a large Gothic cross. On the left, a door that leads to Valentine's bedroom. On the right, a big chimney, and near the chimney the entrance to a room closed by a tapestry. On the right, and in the foreground, a window overlooking the street.

Valentine, alone, expresses her sorrow at being married to Nevers when she is really in love with Raoul (Air: "Parmi les pleurs mon rêve se ranime"). She is surprised by Raoul who wishes to have one last meeting with her. The sound of approaching people leads Raoul to hide behind a curtain, where he hears the Catholic nobles pledge to murder the Huguenots. They are accompanied by three monks, who bless the swords and daggers to be used in the massacre, declaring it to be God's will that the heretics be killed. Only Nevers does not join in the oath (Conjuration:"Des troubles renaissants"). This scene is generally judged the most gripping in the opera, and is accompanied by some of its most dramatic music. When the nobles have departed, Raoul re-appears and is torn between warning his fellows and staying with Valentine (Duet:"Ô ciel! où courez-vous ?"). Valentine is desperate to prevent him from meeting death by going to the assistance of his fellow Protestants and admits she loves him, which sends Raoul into raptures. However they hear the bell of Saint-Germain-l'Auxerrois ringing, the signal for the massacre to begin, and Valentine faints as Raoul leaps out the window to join his co-religionists.

=== Act 5 ===
Scene 1: A beautifully lit ballroom in the Hôtel de Nesle

The Protestants are celebrating the marriage of the Queen to Henry of Navarre. The tolling of a bell interrupts the dancing and festivities, as does the entrance of Raoul, in torn clothing covered in blood, who informs the assembly that the second stroke was the signal for the Catholic massacre of the Huguenots. Admiral Coligny has been assassinated, Raoul tells them, and Protestant men, women and children are being slaughtered in the street by the thousands. The women flee, panic-stricken, as the Protestant men prepare to defend themselves.

Scene 2: A cemetery: in the background, a Protestant church whose stained glass windows are visible. On the left, a small door that leads into the interior of the church. On the right, a gate that overlooks a crossroads

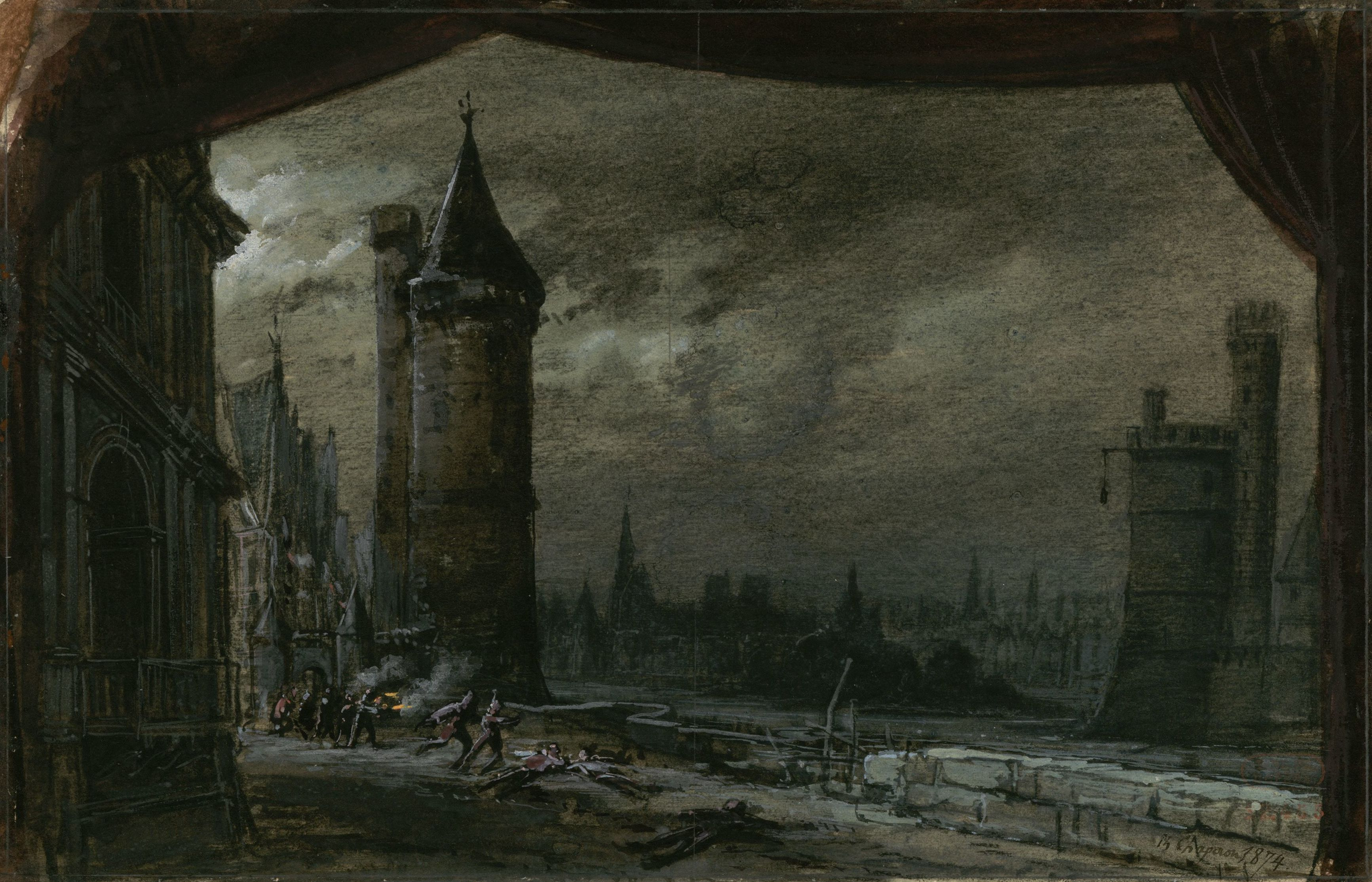
Philippe Chaperon's set design for Act V, Scene 2

Under the leadership of Marcel, Protestant women take refuge with their children in the church. It is there that Raoul finds his old servant, who, resigned, prepares to die. Valentine arrives and tells Raoul that his life will be saved if he agrees to wear a white scarf around his arm, indicating that he is Catholic. She also informs the young man that she is now free, Nevers having been killed after having defended Protestants. Raoul seems to hesitate but finally refuses Valentine's proposal to pass as Catholic. She immediately decides to share the fate of the one she loves by abjuring the Catholic faith. She asks Marcel to bless her. Marcel does so and declares the couple married in the sight of God (Trio: "Savez-vous qu’en joignant vos mains"). Meanwhile, the Protestants who barricaded themselves in the church intone Luther's hymn "Ein feste Burg". Suddenly, the singing inside the church is interrupted. The Catholics have broken down the door of the church and threaten to kill all the Protestant women and children if they do not renounce their faith. After refusing, the Protestants resume their singing, interrupted several times by musket shots. Finally, the song is no longer heard: all were massacred. At the height of exaltation, Marcel thinks he hears the march of angels leading the martyrs to God. Valentine and Raoul share this vision of heaven 'with six harps'. (Trio: "Ah ! voyez ! Le ciel s’ouvre et rayonne !"). Catholic soldiers enter the cemetery, seize Raoul, Valentine and Marcel and drag them away, wounding all three, after they refuse to abjure their faith.

Scene 3: A street in Paris, on the night of 23 to 24 August 1572

Wounded, they are finally murdered by St. Bris and his men, he realising only too late that he has killed his own daughter. (Cf. the closing scene of Fromental Halévy's opera, La Juive, libretto also by Scribe, produced a year earlier than Les Huguenots). It is at this moment that Marguerite's litter appears. She also recognizes Valentine and tries to stop the massacre, to no avail. A chorus of soldiers, hunting for more Protestants to murder and singing 'God wants blood!', brings the opera to a close.

== Analysis ==
=== Libretto ===
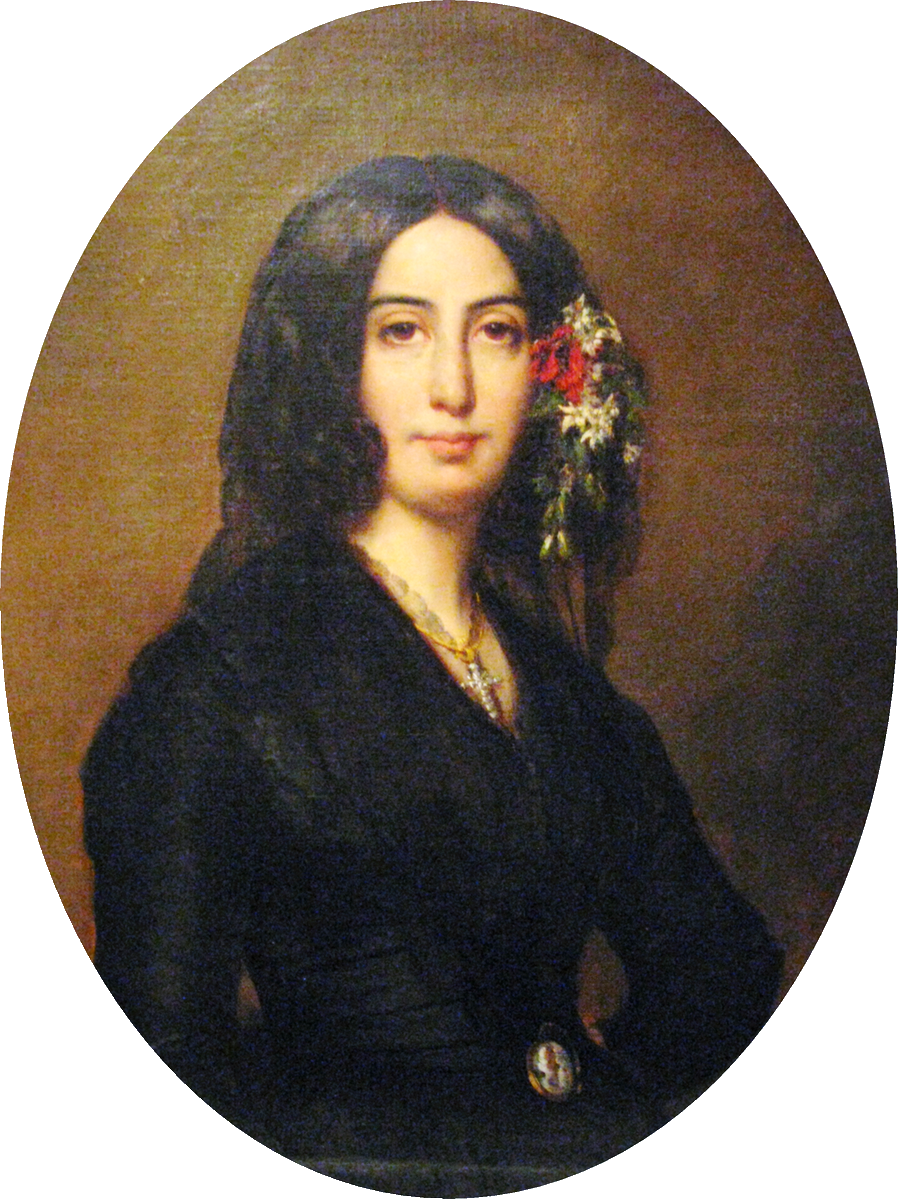
George Sand, who called Les Huguenots "an evangel of love"

In Les Huguenots, Scribe and Meyerbeer depicted religious fanaticism and sectarianism causing bloody civil division for the first time. The composer Robert Schumann in a scathing review of the piece, objected to the use of the hymn "Ein feste Burg" as a musical theme recurring throughout the opera, and to the depiction of religious division, writing "I am not a moralist, but for a good Protestant it is offensive to hear his most cherished song being yelled on the stage and to see the bloodiest drama in the history of his faith degraded to the level of a fairground farce. Meyerbeer's highest ambition is to startle or titillate, and he certainly succeeds in that with the theatre-going rabble." George Sand at first refused to attend a performance of the opera, saying that she did not want to watch Catholics and Protestants slit each other's throats to music written by a Jew. When eventually she did see the piece, however, she was overwhelmed and wrote to Meyerbeer that "Though you are a musician, you are more a poet than any of us!" and called the opera "an evangel of love".

Franz Liszt observed of the libretto "If one continually reproaches the poet for striving after dramatic effects, it would be unjust not to acknowledge how thrilling these can often be" while Hector Berlioz in his review of the premiere wrote "the new libretto by M. Scribe seems to us to be admirably arranged for music and full of situations of undoubted dramatic interest".

Some writers have condemned as nothing more than "kitsch melodrama" the central and fictitious love story between Raoul and Valentine, dependent on Raoul's mistaken belief that she is Nevers' mistress, a misunderstanding that goes on for three acts when it could easily have been cleared up much sooner. Other critics have praised the psychological realism of the characters, Ernest Newman, for instance, stating that "Meyerbeer gave his audiences the delighted feeling that they were being brought into touch with real life, and that the characters they saw on the boards were men and women such as they might meet any day themselves." The character of Marcel, a creation both textually and musically of Meyerbeer, has met particular praise from critics, evolving as he does from the status of intolerant servant in the first act to that of visionary spiritual guide in the last. Liszt wrote "The role of Marcel, the purest type of popular pride and religious sacrifice, seems to us to be the most complete and living character. The unmistakable solemnity of his airs, which expresses so eloquently the moral grandeur of this man of the people, as well as his simplicity, the noble nature of his thought, remains striking from the beginning to the end of the opera."

Meyerbeer had intended a singing role for the character of Catherine de' Medici, Queen Mother at the time of the massacre, in the scene of the blessing of the daggers in Act 4, but the state censorship would not permit a royal personage to be depicted in such an unfavourable light.

Victor Hugo, in his preface to Cromwell (1827), called for the introduction of local colour into historical dramas. For music critic Robert Letellier, this request is perfectly met by Act 3 of Les Huguenots, with its strolling promenaders of all classes setting the scene and its squabbles of Catholics and Protestants interrupted by gypsy dancers and fortune-tellers, reminiscent of episodes from Hugo's Notre-Dame de Paris (1831).

Letellier has also written of the masterly way Scribe's libretto moves from light to darkness. Act 1 is set in the daytime, in the hedonistic surroundings of a chateau belonging to a pleasure-loving Catholic noble (with one of the musical numbers even marked "The Orgy".) Act 2 is set in sparkling sunshine in the beautiful countryside. Act 3, with near riots between Catholic and Protestant factions, as dusk falls. Act 4, with the plotting to massacre the Protestants, at night, and Act 5, with the actual massacre, in the darkness of the early hours of the morning.

In the assessment of music historian David Charlton, Scribe and Meyerbeer in Les Huguenots "created a masterpiece of romantic tragedy".

=== Music ===
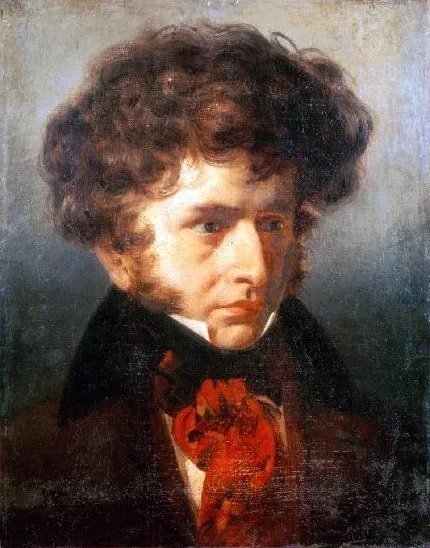
Hector Berlioz, who wrote that in its instrumentation Les Huguenots "surpasses everything previously attempted"

Reviewing the premiere of the opera, Hector Berlioz wrote "The dramatic expression is always true and profound, with fresh colours, warm movement, elegant forms; in instrumentation, in effects of vocal masses, this score surpasses all that has been attempted to this day."

One of the most striking innovations is the treatment of Luther's chorale "Ein feste Burg" as a leitmotif developed and varied throughout the opera. The theme is present from the outset where it is subject to a series of variations that symbolize, according to Letellier, the feelings inspired by religion: recollection, love, consolation, exaltation, but also intolerance and fanaticism. In the song of Marcel in the first act, it corresponds to an expression of faith, full of conviction and aspiration to transcendence. In the finale of the second act, it is used as a cantus firmus to affirm the resolution and strength of Protestants in the face of danger. In the third act, it is a call to arms to escape traps and betrayals. Finally, in the last act, it becomes the stifled and distant prayer of the Protestants who seek to escape the massacre to become an ultimate cry of defiance against the Catholic executioners and is also sung in unison by Valentine, Raoul and Marcel as they have an ecstatic vision of heaven awaiting them upon their imminent deaths.

Also very innovatory were the huge multiple choruses, as for instance in the Pré-aux-Clercs scene at the start of Act 3, when Protestant soldiers sing a "rataplan" chorus, Catholic girls cross the stage chanting praise to the Virgin with a third chorus of law clerks. These are all first heard separately, then combined and to this mix is then added the wives and girlfriends of the Catholic students and Protestant soldiers hurling abuse at each other. Berlioz marveled that "The richness of texture in the Pré-aux-Clercs scene [of act III] […] was extraordinary, yet the ear could follow it with such ease that every strand in the composer's complex thought was continually apparent—a marvel of dramatic counterpoint'. and said the music in that act "dazzles the ear as bright light does the eye".

Both Liszt and Berlioz greatly admired the instrumentation of the opera. Liszt wrote that "the orchestral effects are so cleverly combined and diversified that we have never been able to attend a performance of the Huguenots without a new feeling of surprise and admiration for the art of the master who has managed to dye in a thousand shades, almost ungraspable in their delicacy, the rich fabric of his musical poem".

Meyerbeer used a variety of novel and unusual orchestral effects in the opera. Marcel's utterances are usually accompanied by two cellos and a double bass. The composer revived an archaic instrument, the viola d'amore, which had fallen into complete disuse in the 19th century, for Raoul's aria "Plus blanche que la blanche hermine" and used the bass clarinet for the first time in an opera in the scene in the last act during which Marcel "marries" Valentine and Raoul just before they are murdered, creating an other-worldly, funereal effect.

== Influence ==
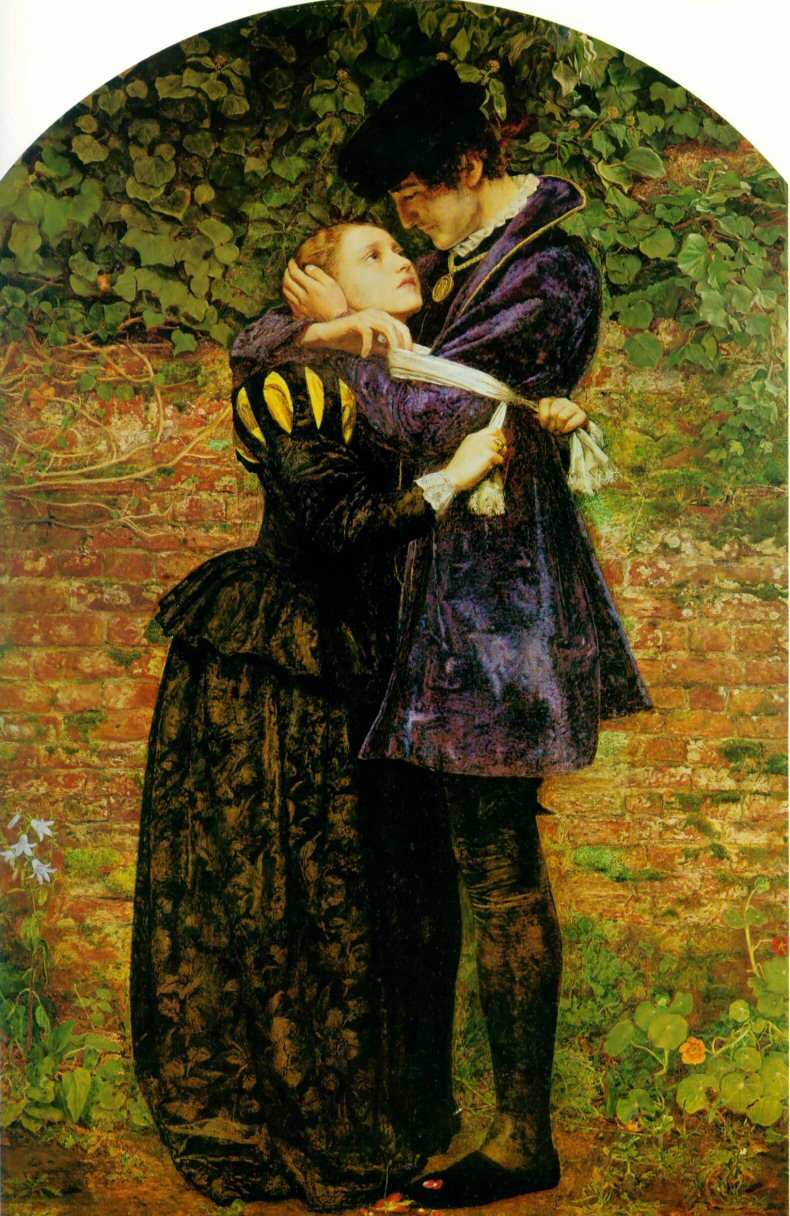
John Everett Millais, A Huguenot, on St. Bartholomew's Day, Refusing to Shield Himself from Danger by Wearing the Roman Catholic Badge (1852)

Following five years after Meyerbeer's own Robert le diable and a year after Fromental Halévy's La Juive, Les Huguenots consolidated the genre of Grand Opera, in which the Paris Opéra would specialise for the next generation, and which became a major box-office attraction for opera houses all over the world. Giuseppe Verdi expressed great admiration for the opera, referring to Acts III and IV as "stupendous" and describing Act V as "true theater”. Hector Berlioz's contemporary account is full of praise, with 'Meyerbeer in command at the first desk [of violins] [...] from beginning to end I found [the orchestral playing] superb in its beauty and refinement [...] .

The immense success of the opera encouraged many musicians, including Franz Liszt and Sigismond Thalberg, to create virtuosic piano works based on its themes.

A military slow march based on the prelude to Les Huguenots is played every year during the ceremony of Trooping the Colour at Horse Guards Parade in London.

== Selected recordings ==
=== Audio recordings ===
Les Huguenots discography, audio recordings
Year	Cast (Marguerite, Valentine, Urbain, Raoul, Marcel, Nevers, Saint-Bris)	Conductor, Opera house and orchestra	Label
1969	Joan Sutherland; Martina Arroyo; Huguette Tourangeau; Anastasios Vrenios; Nicola Ghiuselev; Dominic Cossa; Gabriel Bacquier	Richard Bonynge; Philharmonia Orchestra; Ambrosian Opera Chorus	CD: Decca; Cat: 430 549-2
1988	Ghyslaine Raphanel; Françoise Pollet; Danièle Borst; Richard Leech; Nicola Ghiuselev; Gilles Cachemaille; Boris Martinovich	Cyril Diederich; Orchestre national de Montpellier Languedoc-Roussillon; Opéra national de Montpellier chorus	CD: Erato; Cat: 2292-45027-2
2009	Erin Morley; Alexandra Deshorties; Marie Lenormand; Michael Spyres; Andrew Schroeder; Peter Volpe	Leon Botstein; American Symphony Orchestra	CD: American Symphony Orchestra; Cat:ASO093

=== Video recordings ===
Les Huguenots discography, video rexordings
Year	Cast (Marguerite, Valentine, Urbain, Raoul, Marcel, Nevers, Saint-Bris)	Conductor, Opera house and orchestra (production details)	Label
1990	Joan Sutherland; Amanda Thane; Suzanne Johnston; Anson Austin; Clifford Grant; John Pringle; John Wegner	Richard Bonynge, Opera Australia Orchestra & Chorus (Stage director: Lotfi Mansouri)	DVD: Opus Arte; Cat: OAF 4024D; DVD: Kultur
1991	Angela Denning; Lucy Peacock; Camille Capasso; Richard Leech; Martin Blasius; Lenus Carlson; Hartmut Welker	Stefan Soltesz, Deutsche Oper Berlin Orchestra & Chorus (Stage director: John Dew; sung in German)	DVD: Arthaus Musik; Cat: 100 156
2018	Lisette Oropesa; Ermonela Jaho; Karine Deshayes; Yosep Kang; Nicolas Testé; Florian Sempey; Paul Gay	Michele Mariotti, Paris Opera Orchestra & Chorus (Stage director: Andreas Kriegenburg)	HD video: Paris Opera Play

== Scores ==
"Les Huguenots: extract of the Benediction des poignards" (3:38)

"Les Huguenots: extract of the Conjuratio" (4:03)
Marthe Bakkers soprano (Valentine), Pierre d'Assy bass (St Bris), Emile Boussagol baryton (Nevers). Orchestra and chorus conducted by Alfred Fock. Recorded in 1909 (4:03)

- Vocal/piano score of Les Huguenots: Scores at the International Music Score Library Project
- Réminiscences des Huguenots, p. 412 for piano by Franz Liszt at 412_(Liszt%2C_Franz) IMSLP
- Grande Fantaisie sur l'opera de Meyerbeer 'Les Huguenots', Op. 43 for piano by Sigismond Thalberg at IMSLP
