= Julie Dorus-Gras =

Belgian operatic soprano (1805–1896)

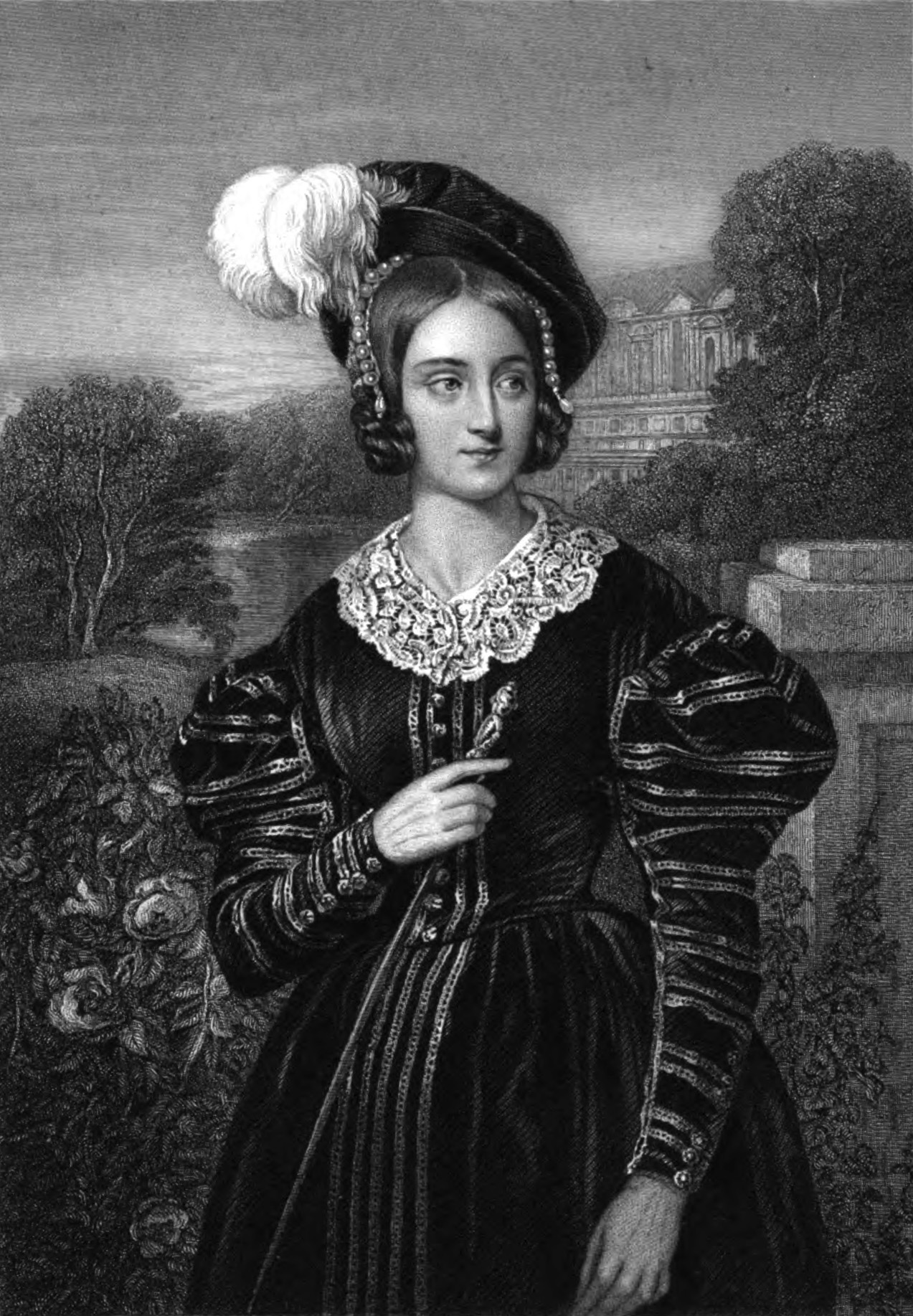
Julie Dorus-Gras as Marguerite de Valois in Les Huguenots, a role she created at the world premiere at the Paris Opera on 29 February 1836

Julie Dorus-Gras (7 September 1805 – 6 February 1896) was a Belgian operatic soprano.

== Early life and training ==
She was born Julie-Aimée-Josèphe Van Steenkiste, the daughter of an ex-soldier who was the leader of the theatre orchestra in her native city Valenciennes. The flautist Louis Dorus was her younger brother. She first studied with her father and began performing as a child, eventually becoming so well known as a vocalist that she received a municipal scholarship which enabled her to continue her studies in Paris. She was admitted to the Paris Conservatoire in 1821 and studied singing in the class conducted by Felice Blangini and François-Louis Henry. Later she received additional vocal training from Marco Bordogni and Ferdinando Paer.

== Career ==
To begin her career she made a concert tour which took her to Brussels. Her concert was so successful, that Count de Liederkerke offered her a contract to sing operatic roles. Although she had not previously considered performing in dramatic works, she agreed, as Guillaume Cassel would coach her for six months to prepare her for singing and acting on stage. She made her debut in 1825 at the Théâtre de la Monnaie in Brussels. In 1829 she performed Elvire in the first Brussels performance of Auber's La muette de Portici and repeated the role in the notorious performance of 25 August 1830 which precipitated the Belgian Revolution.

The increasing political unrest in Belgium caused her to decide to return to Paris. She was engaged by the Paris Opera and first performed there as the Countess in Rossini's Le comte Ory on 9 November 1830. Later she created roles in the world premieres of several notable operas, including Alice in Giacomo Meyerbeer's Robert le diable on 21 November 1831, Oscar in Daniel Auber's Gustave III, Pauline in Gaetano Donizetti's Les Martyrs (the French version of Poliuto), Princess Eudoxie in Fromental Halévy's La Juive, Ginevra in Halévy's Guido et Ginevra, Marguerite de Valois in Meyerbeer's Les Huguenots, and Teresa in Berlioz's Benvenuto Cellini.

Dorus appeared in concert in London in 1839 and sang the title role of Lucia di Lammermoor, in English, at London's Drury Lane Theatre, conducted by Berlioz, in 1847. In 1849 she appeared in some of her most famous roles in French opera at the Royal Opera House, London, and was praised by music critic Henry Chorley as "an excellent artist, with a combined firmness and volubility of execution which have not been exceeded, and were especially welcome in French music".

Dorus acquired the name Gras on 19 April 1833, when she married one of the leading violinists in the orchestra of the Paris Opera. She died in Paris.
