= Mascagni =

Mascagni is a surname of Italian origin. Notable people with the surname include:

- Donato Mascagni (1579–1636), Italian painter
- Paolo Mascagni (1755–1815), Italian physician
- Pietro Mascagni (1863–1945), Italian composer
