= Duponchel =

Duponchel may refer to:

- Henri Duponchel (1794–1868, sometimes confused with Charles-Edmond Duponchel), French architect, stage designer, impresario
- Philogène Auguste Joseph Duponchel (1774–1846), French soldier and entomologist
  - Amphonyx duponchel (Duponchel's sphinx), a moth of the family Sphingidae, named after Philogène Auguste Joseph Duponchel
- Charles-Edmond Duponchel, French architect, accountant and son of Philogène-Auguste
- Auguste Duponchel, chief medical officer of l'Ecole polytechnique and son of Philogène Auguste
