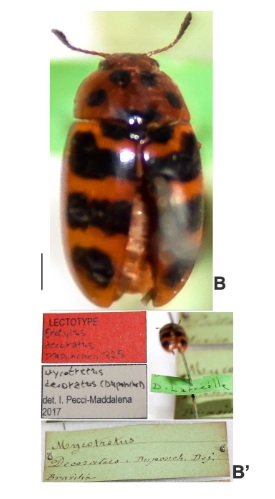

Scientific classification
- Kingdom: Animalia
- Phylum: Arthropoda
- Class: Insecta
- Order: Coleoptera
- Suborder: Polyphaga
- Infraorder: Cucujiformia
- Family: Erotylidae
- Genus: Mycotretus
- Species: M. decoratus

Binomial name
- Mycotretus decoratus (Duponchel, 1825)

Synonyms
- Erotylus decoratus Duponchel, 1825

= Mycotretus decoratus =

Species of beetle

Mycotretus decoratus is a species of beetle of the Erotylidae family. This species is found in northern Brazil.
