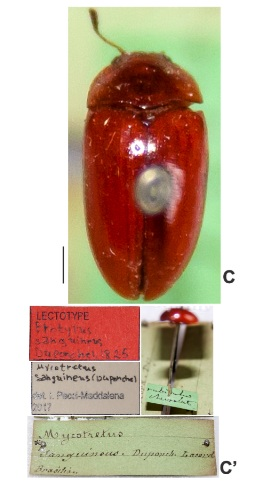

Scientific classification
- Kingdom: Animalia
- Phylum: Arthropoda
- Class: Insecta
- Order: Coleoptera
- Suborder: Polyphaga
- Infraorder: Cucujiformia
- Family: Erotylidae
- Genus: Mycotretus
- Species: M. sanguineus

Binomial name
- Mycotretus sanguineus (Duponchel, 1825)

Synonyms
- Erotylus sanguineus Duponchel, 1825

= Mycotretus sanguineus =

Species of beetle

Mycotretus sanguineus is a species of beetle of the Erotylidae family. This species is found in Colombia and southeastern Brazil.
