= Asarta aethiopella =

Scientific classification
- Domain: Eukaryota
- Kingdom: Animalia
- Phylum: Arthropoda
- Class: Insecta
- Order: Lepidoptera
- Family: Pyralidae
- Genus: Asarta
- Species: A. aethiopella

Binomial name
- Asarta aethiopella (Duponchel, 1837)

Synonyms
- Phycis aethiopella Duponchel, 1837; Asarta aethiopella f. majella Costantini, 1922; Myelois helveticella Zeller, 1839

Species of moth

Asarta aethiopella is a species of snout moth in the genus Asarta. It was described by Philogène Auguste Joseph Duponchel in 1837. It is found in France, Spain, Switzerland, Italy, Germany, Austria, Slovakia, Bosnia and Herzegovina, Albania, North Macedonia, Bulgaria, Romania, Ukraine and Russia.

The wingspan is 14–16 mm.
