= Revue et gazette musicale de Paris =

French-language academic journal

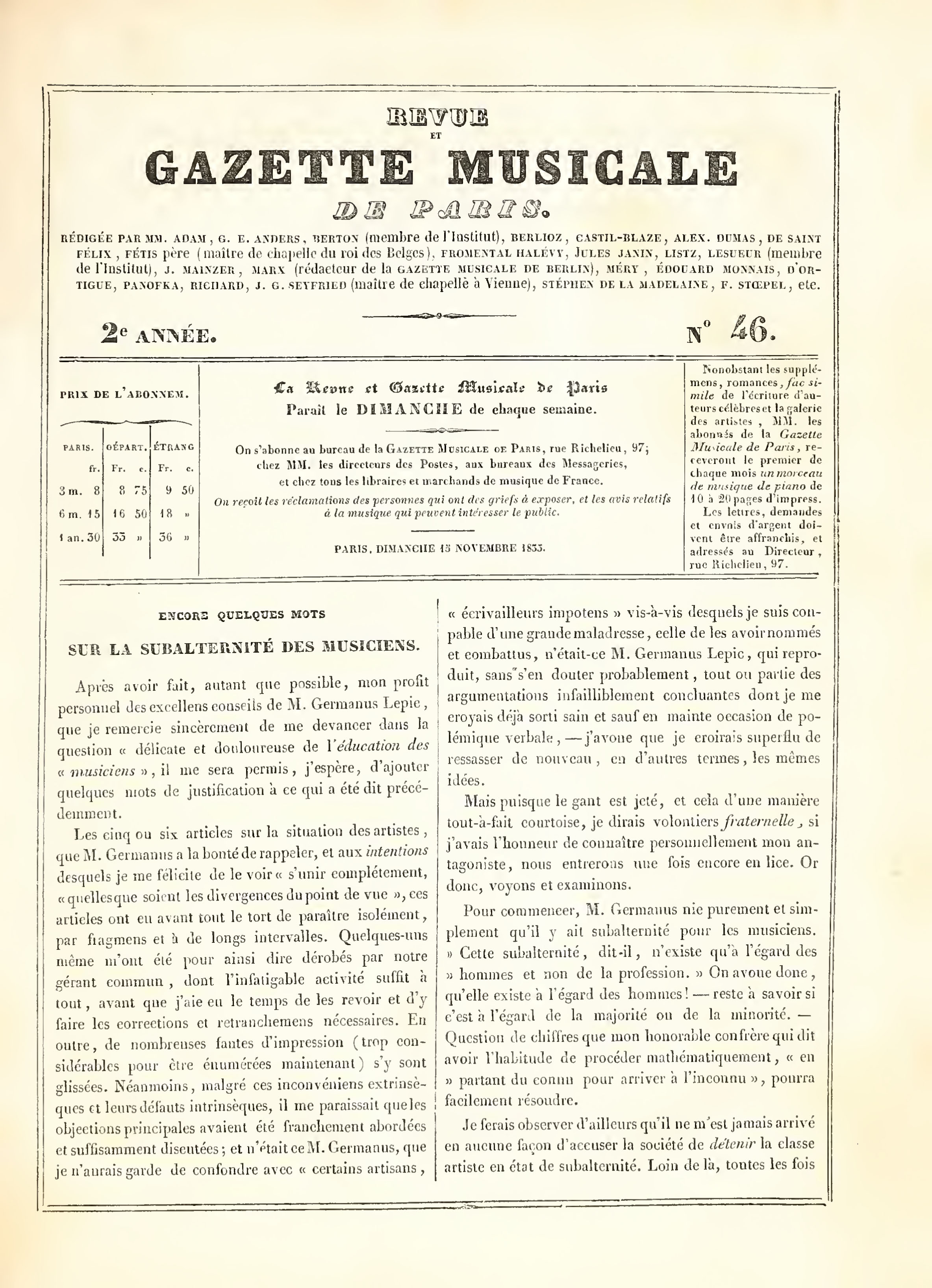
Cover of Revue et Gazette Musicale de Paris (15 November 1835)

The Revue musicale (French pronunciation: [ʁəvy myzikal]) was a weekly musical review founded in 1827 by the Belgian musicologist, teacher and composer François-Joseph Fétis, then working as professor of counterpoint and fugue at the Conservatoire de Paris. It was the first French-language journal dedicated entirely to classical music. In November 1835 it merged with Maurice Schlesinger's Gazette musicale de Paris ([ɡazɛt myzikal də paʁi]; first published in January 1834) to form Revue et gazette musicale de Paris ([ʁəvy e ɡazɛt myzikal də paʁi]), first published on 1 November 1835. It ceased publication in 1880.

== History ==
By 1830 the Revue musicale, written and published by Fétis, was on sale at Maurice Schlesinger's music seller's premises. Schlesinger (whose father founded the Berliner allgemeine musikalische Zeitung) was a German music editor who had moved to Paris in 1821. Schlesinger published editions of classical and modern music under his own name at a reasonable price, most notably works by Mozart, Haydn, Weber, Beethoven, Hummel and Berlioz. He also published Robert le diable and Les Huguenots by Giacomo Meyerbeer, as well as La Juive by Fromental Halévy. Schlesinger founded his own rival publication, the Gazette Musicale de Paris, which first appeared on 5 January 1834.

Another music journal, Le Ménestrel, had first appeared the previous month on 1 December 1833. Until La Revue et Gazette ceased publication in 1880, Le Ménestrel was to be its main rival in terms of influence and breadth of coverage.

In 1835, Schlesinger bought the Revue musicale from Fétis and merged the two journals into the Revue et gazette musicale de Paris. He widened the subject matter of the Gazette musicale from music itself to also include literature about music – in 1837 he commissioned from Honoré de Balzac for the Gazette the novella Gambara (dealing with the new style of grand opera).

The name Revue musicale returned for six months in 1839 as the Revue musicale, journal des artistes, des amateurs et des théatres while the journal was a bi-weekly publication. The list of contributors to the Revue et gazette musicale in 1840 included: François Benoist, Hector Berlioz, Castil-Blaze, Antoine Elwart, Stephen Heller, Jules Janin, Jean-Georges Kastner, Léon Charles François Kreutzer, Franz Liszt, Édouard Monnais (director of the Paris Opera from 1839 to 1847), Joseph d'Ortigue, Theodor Panofka, Ludwig Rellstab, George Sand, Robert Schumann and Richard Wagner.

The French-language monthly magazine Revue des Deux Mondes, founded in July 1829, also featured a section named "Revue musicale".

== Publication chronology, 1827—1850 ==
Revue musicale

First series (6 volumes) - published monthly by Fétis.

- Vol. 1 (1827-8) Première année – Tome I
- Vol. 2 (1828) Première année – Tome II
- Vol. 3 (1828) Tome III
- Vol. 4 (1829) Deuxième année – Tome IV
- Vol. 5 (1829) Troisième année – Tome V
- Vol. 6 (1830) Quatrième année – Tome VI (ending January 1830)

Second series (9 volumes) - published weekly on Saturdays by Fétis.

- Vol. 7 (Deuxième serie, Tome premier) (6 February–1 May 1830)
- Vol. 8 (Deuxième serie, Tome second) (8 May–7 August 1830)
- Vol. 9 (Deuxième serie, Tome troisième) (14 August–6 November 1830)
- Vol. 10 (13 November 1830 – 29 January 1831)
- Vol. 11 (Tome XI - V^{me} année: 5 February 1831 – 28 January 1832)
- Vol. 12 (Tome XII - VI^{me} année: 4 February 1832 – 26 January 1833)
- Vol. 13 (1833) (Tome XIII - VII^{me} année)
  - Issue No. 1, 2 February 1833
  - Issue No. 48, 28 December 1833
- Vol. 14 (Tome XIV - VIII^{me} année)
  - Issue No. 1, 5 January 1834
  - Issue No. 52, 28 December 1834
- Vol. 15 (IX^{me} année: 4 January 1835 – 27 December 1835) Published on Sundays

Gazette musicale de Paris

Published weekly by Schlesinger on Sundays.

- 1834, Vol. 1 (First edition, 1^{ère} année, No. 1, Sunday 5 January 1834)
- 1834, Vol. 2 (1^{ère} année, No. 27, 6 July 1834)
- 1835, Vol. 1 (2^{e} année, No. 2, 11 January 1835). In issue 44, pp. 353–4 (the first edition of Revue et Gazette Musicale de Paris) Schlesinger - comparing himself to a general of Ancient Greece - announced on 1 November 1835 in glowing terms that the struggle with Fétis had been won, and that La Revue Musicale would pass, with arms and baggage-train, ensigns flying and with all the honours of war, into the Gazette musicale. Fétis announced that subscribers to his Revue would receive the Gazette under the Revue's masthead until 1 January 1836, and that he would continue to write exclusively for the Gazette.
- 1835, Vol. 2 (Nos. 45-52, November–December 1835, with supplements)

Revue et gazette musicale de Paris

Appeared on Sundays.

- 3rd year, 1836
- 4th year, 1837
- 5th year, 1838
- 6th year, 1839. From January 1839 until 11 April 1841 the journal appeared twice weekly, on Thursdays and Sundays. For the first six months, (January–June 1839), the Thursday edition appeared as
- Revue musicale, journal des artistes, des amateurs et des théatres with similar font and masthead design. The first edition appeared on Thursday, 3 January 1839, with consistent volume numbering, as 6^{e} année, No. 1.
  - Revue musicale, journal des artistes etc. (Thursdays only: No. 1, Thursday, 3 January 1839 to No. 26, Thursday, 27 June 1839, as Revue Musicale: plus No 27, Thursday, 4 July, and No. 28, Sunday, 7 July, as Revue et Gazette Musicale de Paris) The Sunday edition continued as
  - Revue et gazette musicale de Paris, 6th year, 1839 (6^{e} année, No. 1). (Sundays only: No. 1, Sunday, 6 January until No. 26, Sunday, 30 June; then No 27, Thursday, 4 July, and No. 28, Sunday, 7 July as above; then both Thursday and Sunday editions until No. 72, Sunday 29 December.)
- 7th year, 1840 (Contains both Thursday and Sunday editions of Revue et Gazette Musicale de Paris)
- 8th year, 1841 (bi-weekly until issue of 11 April 1841, p. 225, then Sundays only from 18 April)
- 9th year, 1842
- 10th year, 1843
- 1844 Changes to masthead design and layout. (supplement to 7 January issue contains facsimiles of hundreds of signatures of composers and musicians).
- 1845
- 1846

Schlesinger sold the journal in 1846 to a former employee, Louis Brandus.

- 1847 Reverts to old masthead & layout.
- 1848 (Google books)
- 1849
- 1850
- etc. until 1880

The journal was suspended from September 1870 to September 1871 during the Siege of Paris, bringing the Franco-Prussian War to an end.
