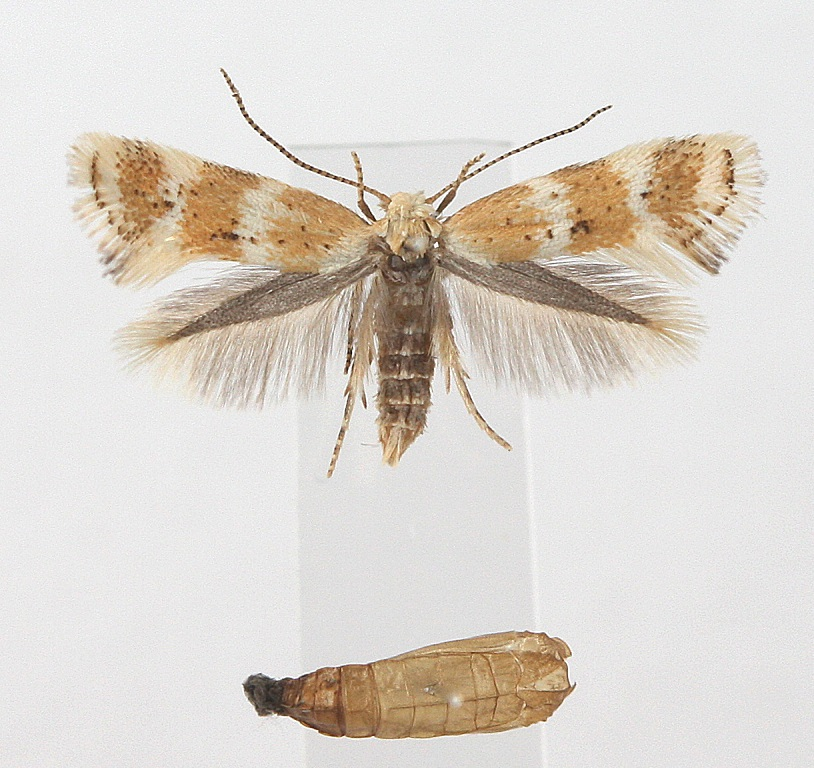

Scientific classification
- Domain: Eukaryota
- Kingdom: Animalia
- Phylum: Arthropoda
- Class: Insecta
- Order: Lepidoptera
- Family: Elachistidae
- Genus: Elachista
- Species: E. subocellea

Binomial name
- Elachista subocellea (Stephens, 1834)

Synonyms
- List: Aphelosetia subocellea Stephens, 1834; Elachista flammeaepennella Costa, [1836]; Elachista pollinariella Zeller sensu Stainton, 1851; Poeciloptilia disertella Herrich-Schäffer, 1855; Elachista disertella (Herrich-Schäffer, 1855); Elachista dispunctella (Duponchel, [1843]), sensu Pierce & Metcalfe, 1935; Elachista subcollutella Toll, 1936

= Elachista subocellea =

Species of moth

Elachista subocellea is a moth of the family Elachistidae. It is found from Fennoscandia to the Iberian Peninsula, Italy and Romania and from Ireland to Poland.

The wingspan is 8–10 millimetres (0.31–0.39 in).Differs from E. collitella as follows : forewings whiter, costa not distinctly fuscous towards base, plical and second discal stigmata sometimes distinct, black.

Adults are on wing from June to July.
