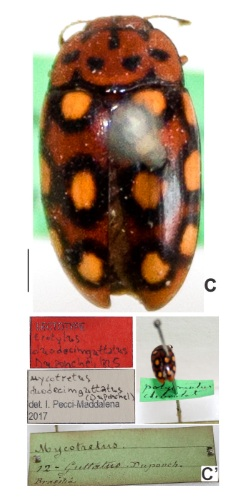

Scientific classification
- Kingdom: Animalia
- Phylum: Arthropoda
- Clade: Pancrustacea
- Class: Insecta
- Order: Coleoptera
- Suborder: Polyphaga
- Infraorder: Cucujiformia
- Family: Erotylidae
- Genus: Mycotretus
- Species: M. duodecimguttatus

Binomial name
- Mycotretus duodecimguttatus (Duponchel, 1825)

Synonyms
- Erotylus duodecimguttatus Duponchel, 1825; Erotylus ocellatus Germar, 1824; Mycotretus ocellatus consociatus Kuhnt, 1910

= Mycotretus duodecimguttatus =

Species of beetle

Mycotretus duodecimguttatus is a species of beetle of the Erotylidae family. This species is found in southern, northern and southeastern Brazil, Colombia and Peru.

== Subspecies ==
- Mycotretus duodecimguttatus duodecimguttatus (Brazil, Colombia and Peru)
- Mycotretus duodecimguttatus consociatus (Kuhnt, 1910) (Colombia)
