= Joseph d'Ortigue =

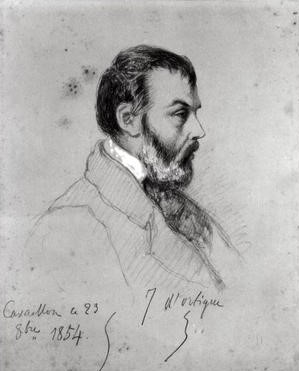
- Born: Joseph Louis d'Ortigue; 22 May 1802; Cavaillon, France
- Died: 20 November 1866 (aged 64); Paris, France
- Occupations: musicologist; critic

Joseph Louis d'Ortigue (22 May 1802 – 20 November 1866) was a French musicologist and critic. A specialist in liturgical music and a conservative Catholic of ultramontane and royalist leanings, he was a close friend of both Berlioz and Liszt. His most influential work was Dictionnaire liturgique, historique, et theorique de plain-chant et le musique d'église, but he also wrote for many of the most prominent periodicals of the day, including Journal des débats and Le Ménestrel where he was the editor-in-chief from 1863 until his sudden death at the age of 64.

== Early life ==
D'Ortigue was born in Cavaillon, the son of Jacques and Marie Marguerite (née Gaussen) d'Ortigue. His father was a justice of the peace and former army officer who had been educated at the Oratorian college in Tournon. The d'Ortigue family had lived in Provence for nearly six centuries, serving as magistrates, notaries, and legislators. Many other members had served as Catholic clergy or nuns. Five of the twelve brothers and sisters of d'Ortigue's grandfather, Henri Francois Xavier, had entered religious orders (two Carmelites, two Jesuits and one Bernardin). D'Ortigue received his earliest music education in Cavaillon, studying piano, violin and organ with his mother's cousin Henri Sébastien Blaze and Blaze's son Castil-Blaze. Later, his parents sent him to Aix-en-Provence to be educated in the humanities by the Jesuits, and then, acceding to their wishes, he enrolled in the Faculty of Law at the Université d'Aix. However, during his time at the university he also continued his study of the violin and took part in concerts at amateur salons and the Aix Cathedral.

== First steps as a writer ==
After finishing his law studies in 1827, d'Ortigue went to Paris to serve his internship. However, he soon became involved in the musical and literary life of the city, and in 1827 the journal Mémorial Catholique published his first piece of music criticism. He took up an appointment in Apt as a juge auditeur in 1828, (Note: In the 19th century a juge auditeur was a young magistrate who could hear and make judgements on minor cases.) but after a few months made the decision to abandon a legal career for a literary one. He returned to Paris in 1829, continued writing for Mémorial Catholique, and produced his first pamphlet, De la Guerre des dilettanti. The pamphlet which was critical of Rossini's influence on France's operatic and artistic life in general caused a considerable stir. Long an admirer of the Catholic priest and philosopher Felicité de Lamennais, d'Ortigue sent him a copy of De la Guerre des dilettanti. Lamennais invited him to work and study at La Chênaie, his house in Brittany. During his six months at La Chênaie d'Ortigue immersed himself in Lamennais's extensive library, became acquainted with the German philosophers, and researched the music of the ancient Greeks and Romans. He would later help Lamennais write the sections on music in his Esquisse d'une philosophie.

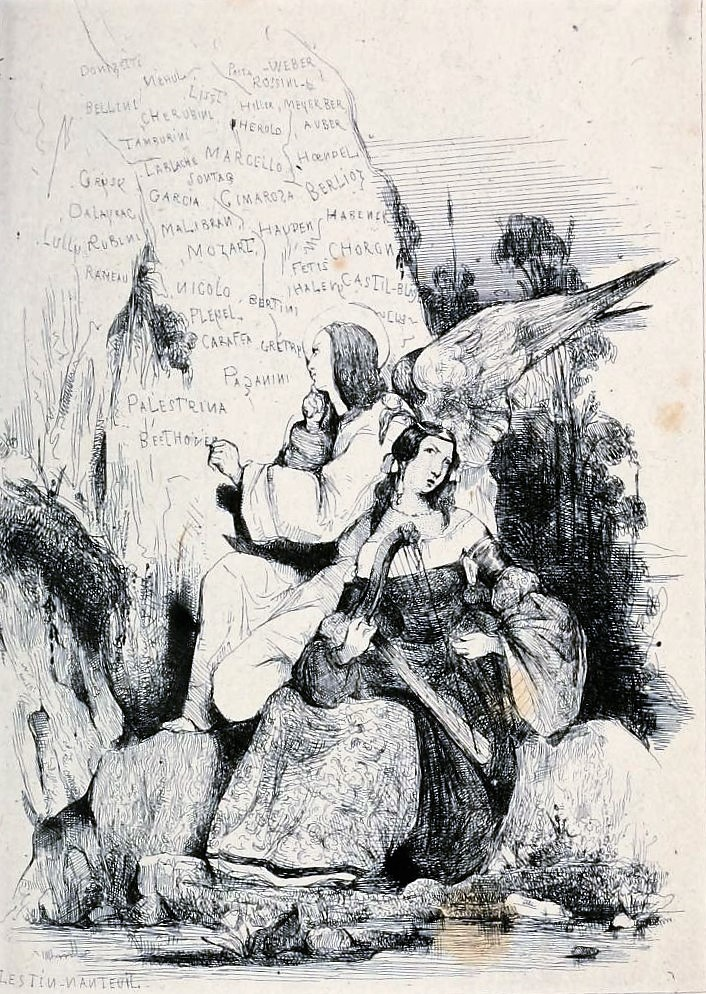
Frontispiece by Célestin Nanteuil for d'Ortigue's book Le balcon de l'opéra

D'Ortigue returned to Paris in July 1830 when the city was in the midst of the 1830 Revolution. He became a founding editor of the short-lived journal L'Avenir which was established by Lamennais in 1830 to espouse his Liberal Catholic philosophy. D'Ortigue also wrote for several other journals including Le Correspondant, Le Courrier de l'Europe, La Quotidienne, Gazette musicale de Paris, and Revue de Paris. In 1833 he published Le Balcon de l'Opéra, a collection of his music criticism, and the following year a two-volume novel, La Sainte-Baume. Partially autobiographical, La Sainte-Baume recounts the pilgrimage of two artists to Sainte-Baume and expresses many of the philosophical and aesthetic views, especially those concerning music, that would mark d'Ortigue's work. During this time he also established close friendships with Franz Liszt and Hector Berlioz and wrote the first serious biographies the composers. His biography of Berlioz was published in Revue de Paris in 1832. His biography of Liszt was published in Gazette musicale de Paris in 1835. It was d'Ortigue who arranged for Liszt, who shared many of his views on Catholicism and the role of the artist in society, to meet Abbé Lammenais in 1834. Both Liszt and d'Ortigue were also among the earliest champions of Berlioz's music.

== Mature years ==
In February 1835 d'Ortigue married Fanny (Suzanne Françoise) François at Issy-les-Moulineaux where d'Ortigue was living at the time. Two of the couple's three children, Marie and Jacques, were born there. In 1840 they moved to a town house in Paris on the Rue Saint-Lazare where d'Ortigue would live for the rest of his life and where their youngest child, Jeanne, was born in 1843. From the late 1830s d'Ortigue took on a variety of posts in addition to his music journalism. In 1837 he was hired to catalogue the medieval music manuscripts in the Royal Library and in 1839 he was appointed professor of choral singing at the Lycée Henri-IV. During this time he was also involved in organ manufacturing and sales and published articles on the history of the organ. It was an interest he would maintain throughout his life, later advising Berlioz, who was a musical instrument judge at the 1851 Great Exhibition, on the merits of French organs and composing some pieces of organ music himself. His reaction to the treatment of Berlioz's opera Benvenuto Cellini by the Paris Opera, the public, and most music critics led to his publication of a 350-page work, De l'École musicale italienne et de l'administration de l'Académie royale de musique, à l'occasion de l'opéra de M. H. Berlioz, (Note: The work was republished in 1840 under the title Du théatre italien et de son influence sur le goût musical françois.) in which he strongly defended Berlioz. Three years later d'Ortigue was made a Chevalier of the Legion of Honour.

In 1852 d'Ortigue published the work which cemented his reputation as a musicologist—Dictionnaire liturgique, historique et théorique de plain-chant et le musique d'église. This dictionary of plain chant and liturgical music was over a thousand pages long and fifteen years in the writing. In 1857 he collaborated with Louis Niedermeyer in the founding of La Maîtrise, a journal devoted to church music which published many of Niedermeyer's works. They also co-wrote Traité théorique et pratique de l'accompagnement du Plain-Chant, a treatise on the theory and practice of plain chant accompaniment published in 1856. After the demise of La Maîtrise, d'Ortigue and Félix Clément founded the Journal des Maîtrises in 1862. This periodical was short-lived and reflected d'Ortigue's increasingly conservative principles concerning in sacred music. (Note: Chouquet described d'Ortigue's later views on church music as "reactionary". Fétis went further, lamenting that d'Ortigue had moved away from the innovative, liberal spirit that marked his early writings on the subject and characterising his late views as "Jansenist".) Throughout this time, he continued writing as a music critic for multiple French periodicals and in 1861 published La musique à l'église, an anthology of those reviews and articles which pertained to sacred music. The last three years of d'Ortigue's life found his influence and authority on musical matters at their height. In 1863, he took over from Berlioz as the chief music critic of Journal des débats and became the editor-in-chief of Le Ménestrel. He was invited to judge international competitions, sat on various government commissions, and became a member of the music academies of both German and Italy.

D'Ortigue died suddenly of a stroke on 20 November 1866. He was 64. Armand de Pontmartin wrote in one the many obituaries lamenting his early death that d'Ortigue had died in the fullness of his intellectual powers and at the climax of his career, surrounded by a brilliant group of younger musicians and critics who looked to him for guidance. After d'Ortigue's funeral at Notre-Dame-de-Lorette, he was buried in Montmartre Cemetery. The eulogy at his graveside was given by Auguste Léo, a young editor at the Journal des débats who also read out passages from the journal's tribute to d'Ortigue written by Silvestre de Sacy. (Note: D'Ortigue's son was abroad when he died and was unable return to Paris in time for his father's funeral.) D'Ortigue's widow, Fanny, died in 1881 at the age of 79.
