= Henri Duponchel =

French architect, designer, director and silversmith

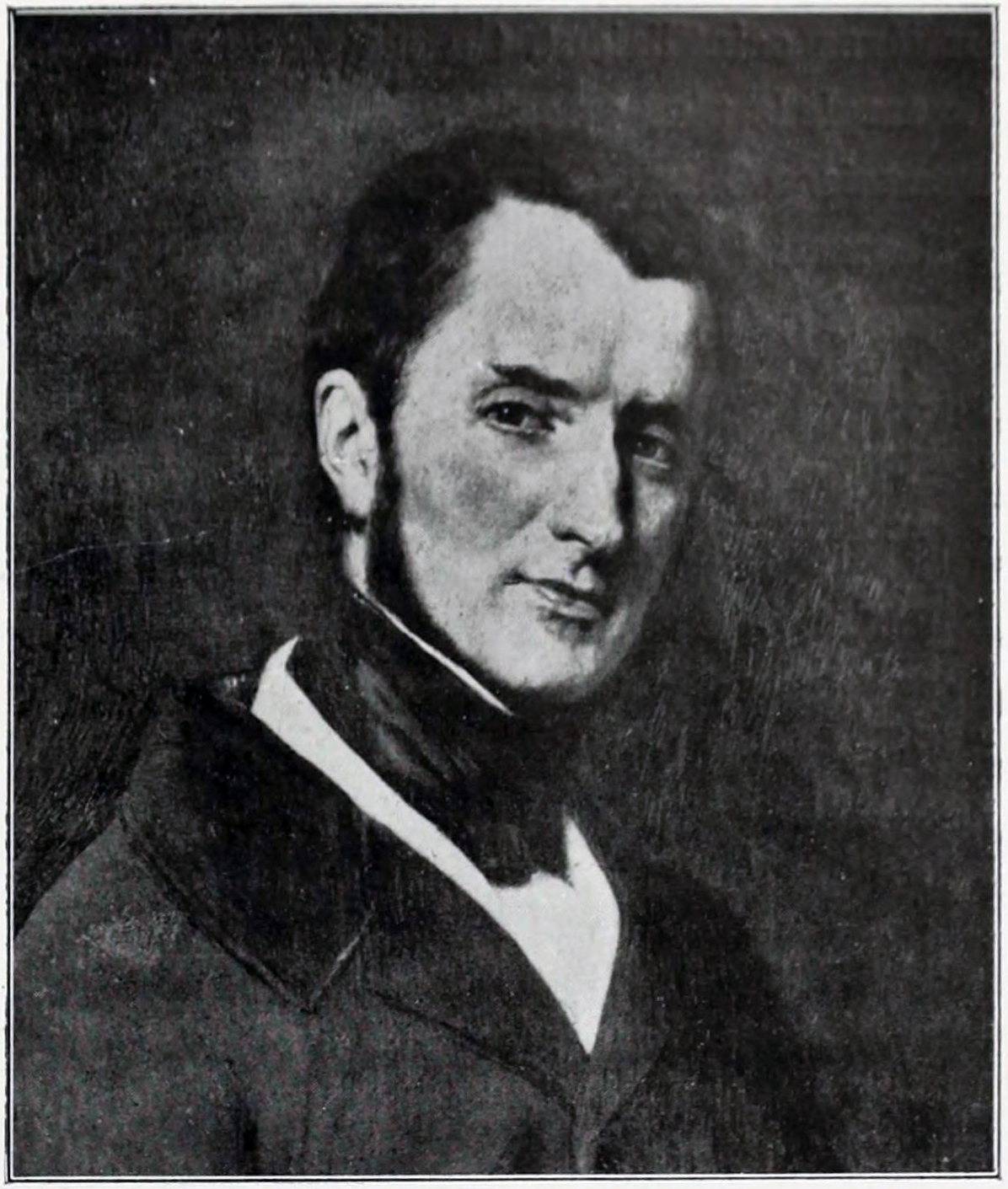
Henri Duponchel

Henri Duponchel (28 July 1794 – 8 April 1868) was in turn a French architect, interior designer, costume designer, stage designer, stage director, managing director of the Paris Opera, and a silversmith. He has often been confused with Charles-Edmond Duponchel, a contemporary who also lived and worked in Paris.

== Early life and training as a painter ==
He was born Henry Duponchel on the rue des Lombards in Paris to Pierre-Henry Duponchel (c. 1752 – 18 October 1821), who ran a grocery-hardware store, and Marie-Geneviève-Victoire Théronenne (d. 8 August 1842). The family subsequently moved to the rue Sainte-Croix de la Bretonnerie. According to early biographies Duponchel took lessons from the painter and theatre enthusiast Pierre Guérin and was a fellow student with Eugène Delacroix. Duponchel and Delacroix remained good friends, and many years later, in 1831, Duponchel recommended Delacroix as a traveling companion and artist for an extended trip to Morocco with the diplomat Count Charles de Mornay. Duponchel, who did not himself know Mornay, had some influence through his friendship with the actress Mademoiselle Mars, who was Mornay's mistress. After returning from the trip, Delacroix created one of his more famous paintings, Women of Algiers (1834).

== Architect and interior designer ==
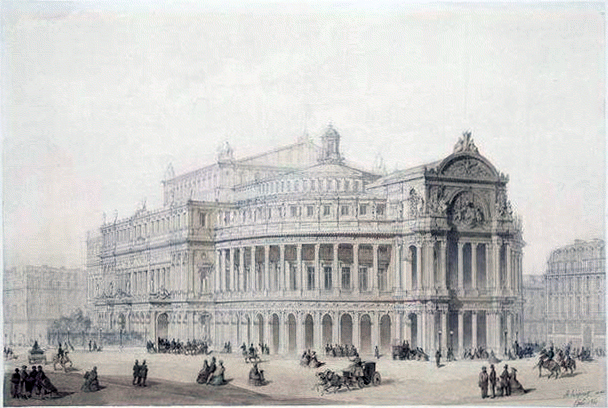
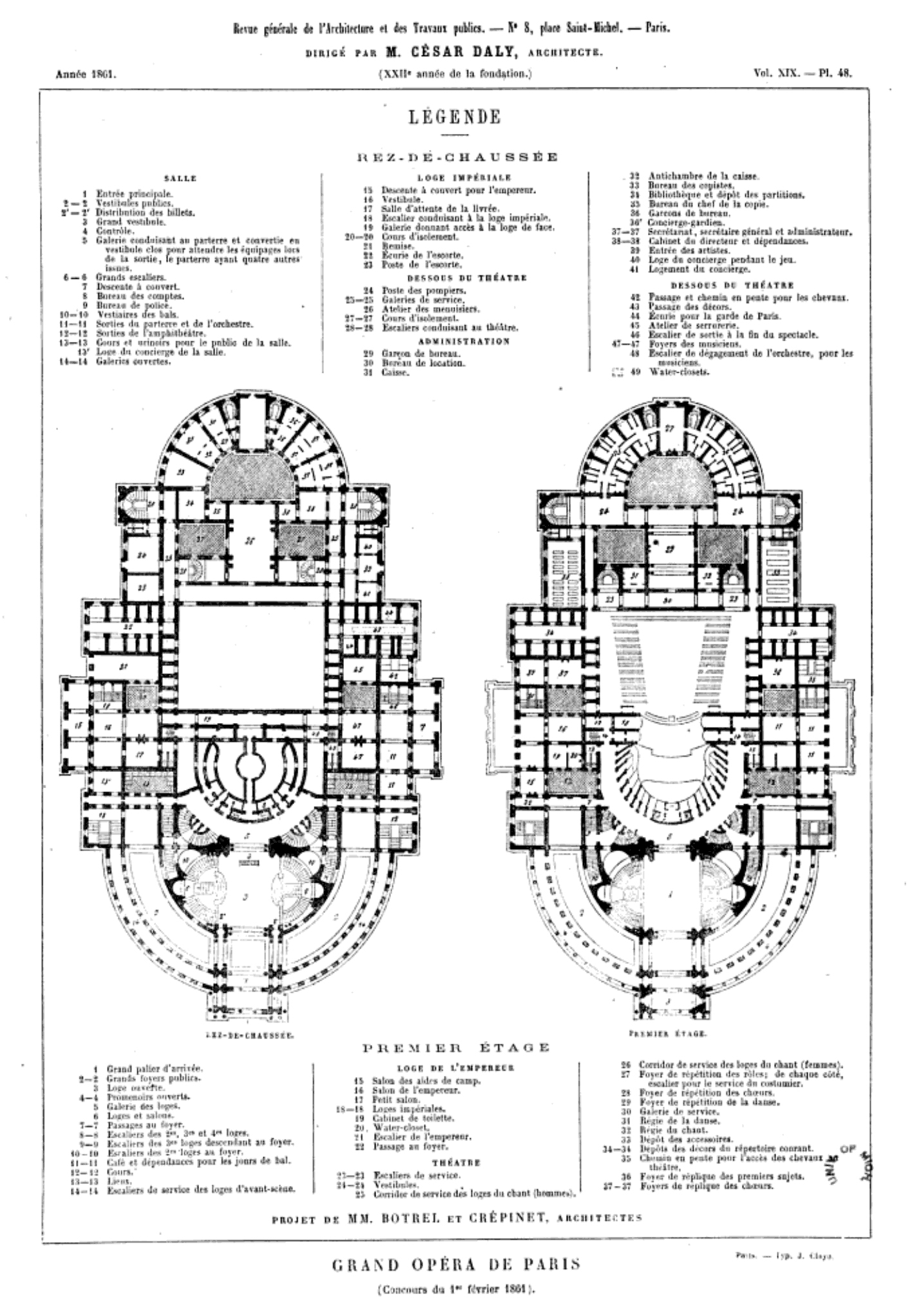
Design for a new opera house by Botrel, Crépinet, and Duponchel (February 1861)

Early biographers also say that Duponchel attended courses in architecture at the École des Beaux-Arts, but this must be viewed with caution as there is no record of it in the student registers. At the time of his father's death in 1821, he had in effect become an architect, but some sources cast doubt on this, saying that he was an amateur and unaware of the technical side of the subject. Later, in February 1861, Duponchel collaborated with two other more well-established architects, Botrel and Alphonse-Nicolas Crépinet, and submitted an architectural project in a competition for the design of a new opera house. G. Bourdin wrote unfavourably in Le Figaro that the designs were remarkable in revealing that, while Duponchel had studied the subject, it was not likely that he had completed a diploma, and that to call him an architect was an overstatement. He also pointed out that throughout his career Duponchel habitually benefited from collaboration with others. However, when the results were announced Duponchel and his collaborators won the second place prize of 4,000 francs out of 170 entrants.

The first records of Duponchel's work activities are in the areas of architecture and interior decoration. At the end of 1818 he was associated with a young architect by the name of Léonard-Ferdinand Verneuil, but in what capacity is not clear. Verneuil's father-in-law was the director of the Théâtre de la Porte-Saint-Martin, and this may have been an important influence. Duponchel may have also served with Camille Piron as architect for the hôtel particulier (town house) of Baron James de Rothschild, and it is generally agreed that at minimum he provided neoclassical decor for the ballroom and neo-Pompeian for the billiards room. Pierre Cicéri and Lebe-Gigun, scene painters at the Opéra, did the decorative painting, which initiated relationships that were to prove significant for Duponchel's subsequent career. The work also inaugurated an important patronage from the Baron. Continuing his association with Piron, Duponchel also executed in 1821 a neo-Pompeian decor for the hôtel of the actor Talma on the rue de la Tour-des-Dames. In 1826 he oversaw the construction of an elegant, small hôtel in Italian renaissance style on an unusual site located between the garden and court of the Hôtel de Bourrienne on the rue d'Hauteville.

== Stage designer and director ==
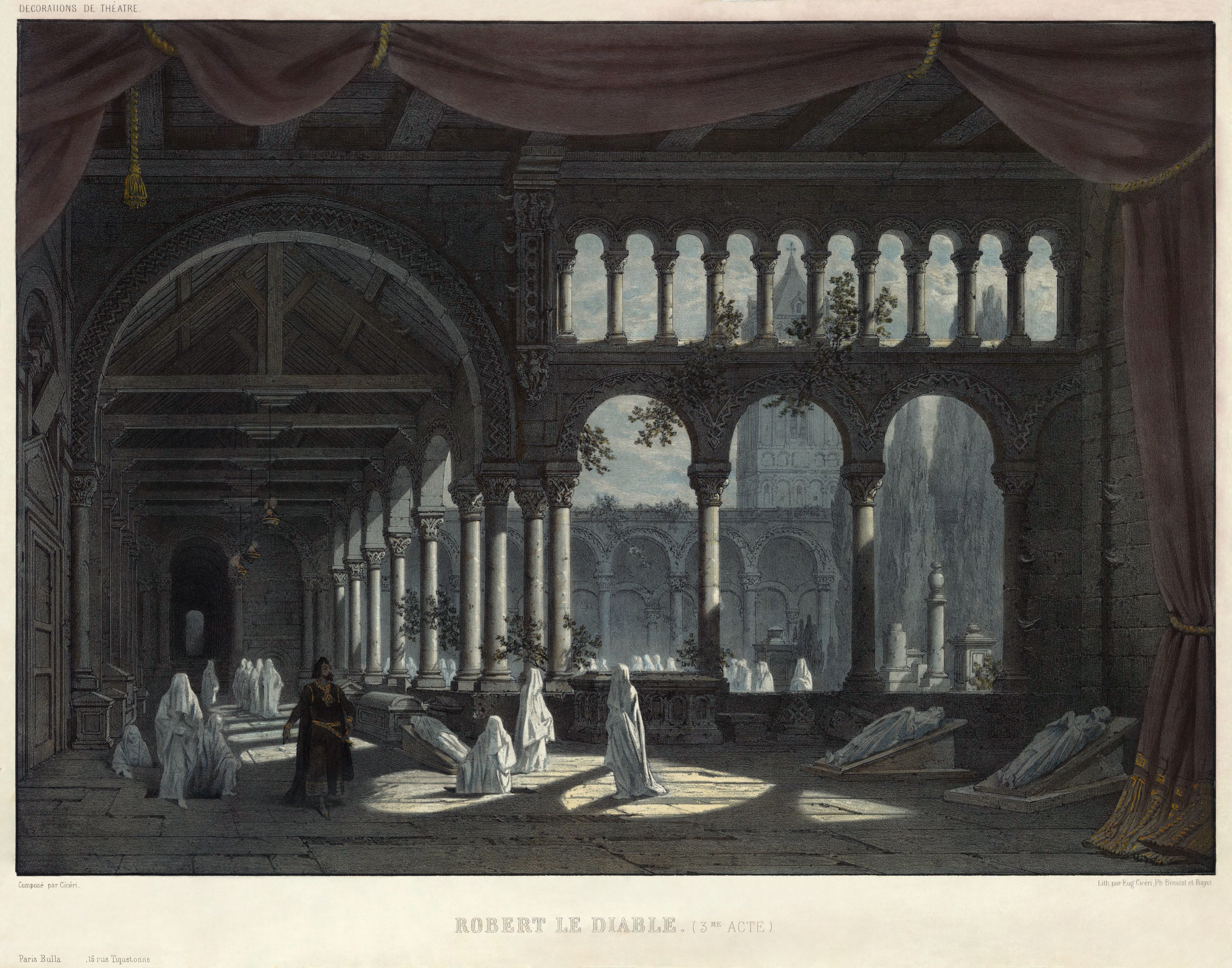
Scene of the "Ballet of the Dead Nuns" in Robert le diable (1831), a co-design of Cicéri and Duponchel

Duponchel worked as a stage designer at the Comédie-Française, where in 1827 he collaborated as a costume designer with Cicéri as the scenery designer in creating a 15th-century setting for Jean-Marie Mély-Janin's play Louis XI (15 February 1827). Soon thereafter Duponchel joined Cicéri at the Opéra. On 8 August 1827, at the ballerina Marie Taglioni's sixth and final performance in her debut at the Paris Opera in the ballet Le Sicilien (23 July), Duponchel created a new tradition by throwing a crown of white roses on the stage at her curtain calls, the first time flowers had ever been thrown on the stage at that theatre.

Duponchel also became a stage director, working on almost all productions at the Opéra from about 1828 up to 1849, beginning with Auber's La muette de Portici and including Halévy's La juive, Meyerbeer's Les Huguenots (a production costing 160,000 francs), and ending with Meyerbeer's Le prophète. Alphonse Royer called him the "Alexander of the mise-en-scène." He was an innovative stage designer who promoted the introduction of "local colour" not previously a characteristic of productions at the Opera. With Cicéri, he co-designed stage setting for Filippo Taglioni's ghostly "Ballet of the Dead Nuns" in Act 3 of Meyerbeer's opera Robert le diable (1831). (Marie Taglioni danced Hélèna, the Mother Superior.) The ballet scenario was Duponchel's own suggestion, replacing the previously intended staid scenario set on Olympus. Duponchel had also introduced new technical tricks, including English traps for the sudden appearance and disappearance of the ghosts. This scene became so famous that it was remembered until the end of the century. Meyebeer even began to complain that the spectacle was too much and was pushing his music into the background. The press coined the term "Duponchellerie" to refer to scenic spectacles that were considered excessive. Duponchel also collaborated with Hygin-Auguste Cavé in writing the libretto of Halévy's 1832 'ballet-opéra' La tentation.

== Impresario ==
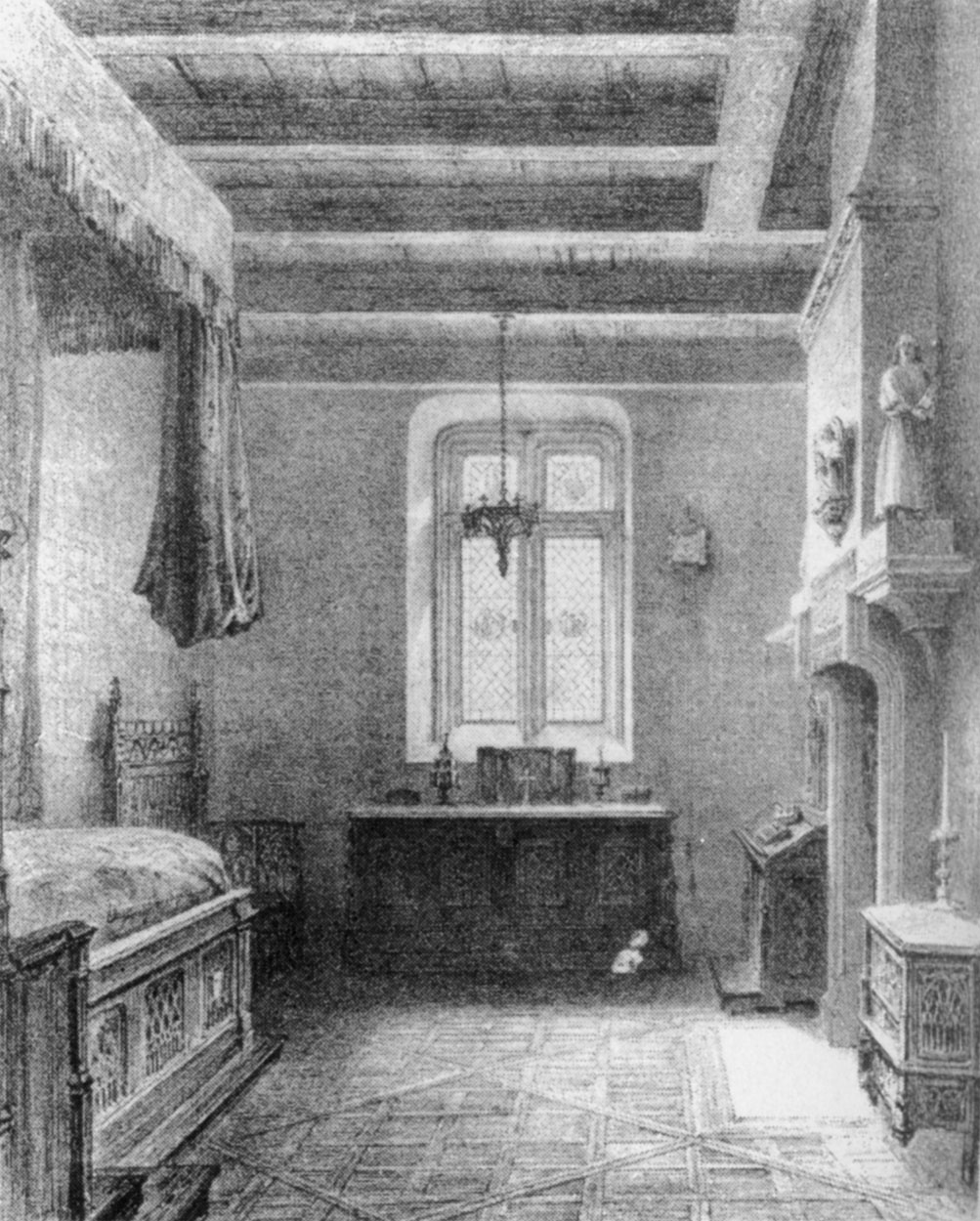
Duponchel's bedchamber at the Opéra's Salle Le Peletier, designed by Jean-Jacques Feuchère (1836)

Duponchel's official positions at the Opéra had included Inspecteur du matériel de la scène (1829–31) and Directeur de la scène (1831–1835), but after Louis Véron retired in 1835, Duponchel became sole Directeur on 1 September 1835, and joint Directeur with Édouard Monnais on 1 December 1835. It was a financially difficult period at the Opéra after Louis Véron's retirement. The state subvention to the theatre had dropped from a high of 870,000 francs per annum to as low as 620,000 francs, about one third of the annual budget. Duponchel formed an alliance with Marie-Alexander Aguado, who helped to underwrite the deficit. Continuing to have difficulty, Duponchel formed a co-directorship with Léon Pillet on 1 June 1840, but the two men had a quarrel and Duponchel withdrew, returning to his former position as scenic director, in October 1841. Aguado died in 1842 creating further financial problems, and Pillet formed an intimate relationship with the singer Rosine Stoltz, favoring her in the selection of roles at the Opéra and causing dissension within the company and with the public. After being severely attacked in the press, and with his losses mounting, he was forced to retire in October 1847. Duponchel then rejoined the administration of the Opéra in a co-directorship with Nestor Roqueplan. Duponchel retired from all types of work in opera in November 1849.

Premieres (except as noted) during Duponchel's two periods as director of the Opéra included:

- First directorship (1 September 1835 – October 1841)
  - Meyerbeer's Les Huguenots, grand opera in 5 acts (29 February 1836)
  - Adam's La fille du Danube, pantomime-ballet in 2 acts (21 September 1836)
  - Bertin's La Esmeralda, grand opera in 4 acts (14 November 1836)
  - Niedermeyer's Stradella, grand opera in 5 acts (3 March 1837)
  - Halévy's Guido et Ginevra, grand opera in 5 acts (5 March 1838)
  - Berlioz's Benvenuto Cellini, opera in 2 acts (10 September 1838)
  - Auber's Le lac des fées, grand opera in 5 acts (1 April 1839)
  - Donizetti's Les martyrs, grand opera in 4 acts (10 April 1840)
  - Donizetti's La favorite, grand opera in 4 acts (2 December 1840)
  - Weber's Le Freyschutz, romantic opera in 3 acts as adapted by Berlioz (7 June 1841)
  - Adam's Giselle, fantastic ballet in 2 acts (28 June 1841)
- Second directorship (October 1847 – November 1849)
  - Verdi's Jérusalem, grand opera in 4 acts (26 November 1847)
  - Meyerbeer's Le prophète, grand opera in 5 acts (16 April 1849)

== Gold and silver dealer and manufacturer ==
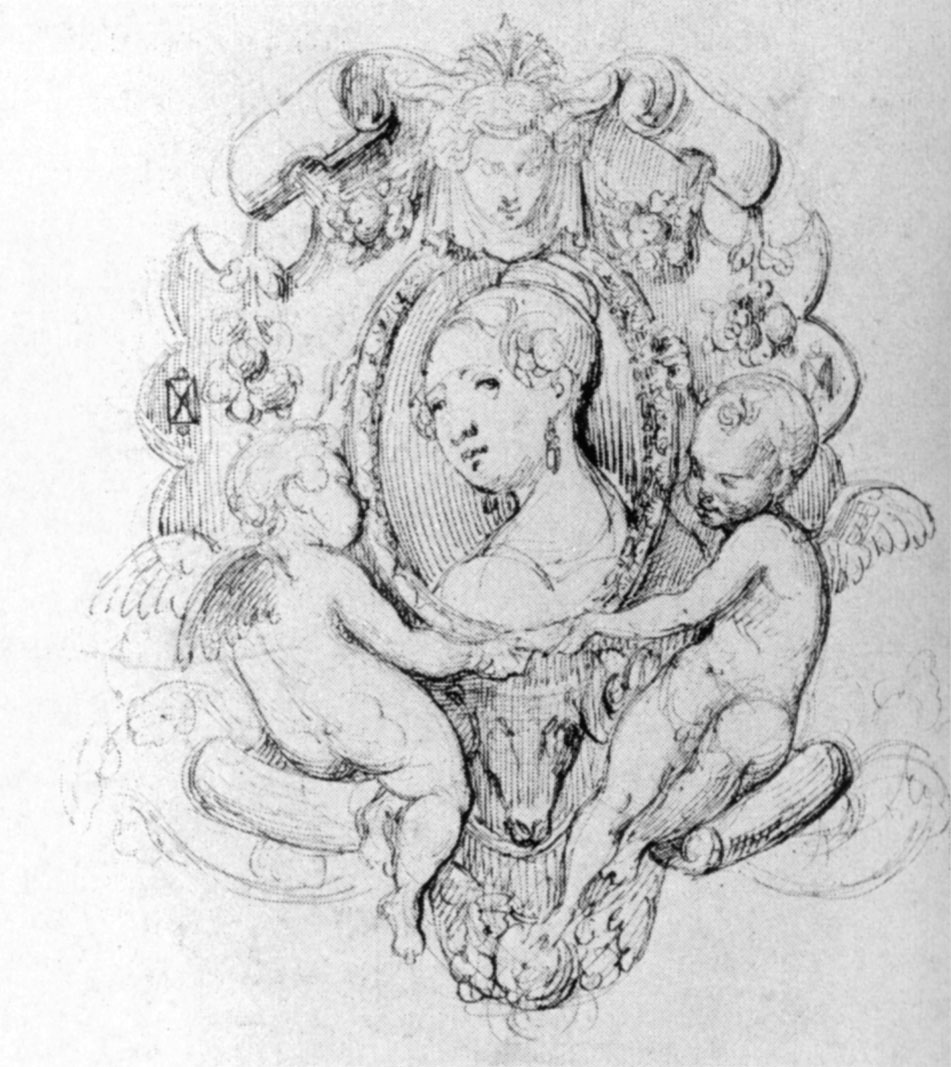
Portrait of Madame Duponchel, design by Jean-Jacques Feuchère for a miniature setting in precious metal

On 11 February 1842, not long after Duponchel first quit as director of the Opéra, he signed a contract with the silversmith and lapidary, Jean-Valentin Morel, who had formerly been in the workshop of Jean-Baptiste Fossin. Totally ignorant of silversmithing, Duponchel brought to the enterprise taste and energy, as well as considerable capital, acquired from the sale of his opera privilège to Pillet for 500,000 francs. Having been to London in 1825, 1836 and 1838, he was convinced that the state of the art of silversmithing in France was comparable to that in England. Their venture, set up in an apartment at 39 rue Neuve-Saint-Augustin and called Morel & Cie, became very successful. At the exhibition of 1844 Morel received a gold medal.

By the end of 1846, however, disagreements had sprung up between the two associates, resulting in a lawsuit won by Duponchel, which brought about the dissolution of the partnership, and awarded him sole possession of the property and merchandise. Morel was forbidden to continue with silversmithing in Paris and moved his business to London in a partnership with Fossin's son Jules. In the meantime, Duponchel had regained his directorship at the Opéra, where he remained until 13 November 1849, but also continued to successfully operate the gold and silver business with other associates as shown by their participation in the exposition of 1849.

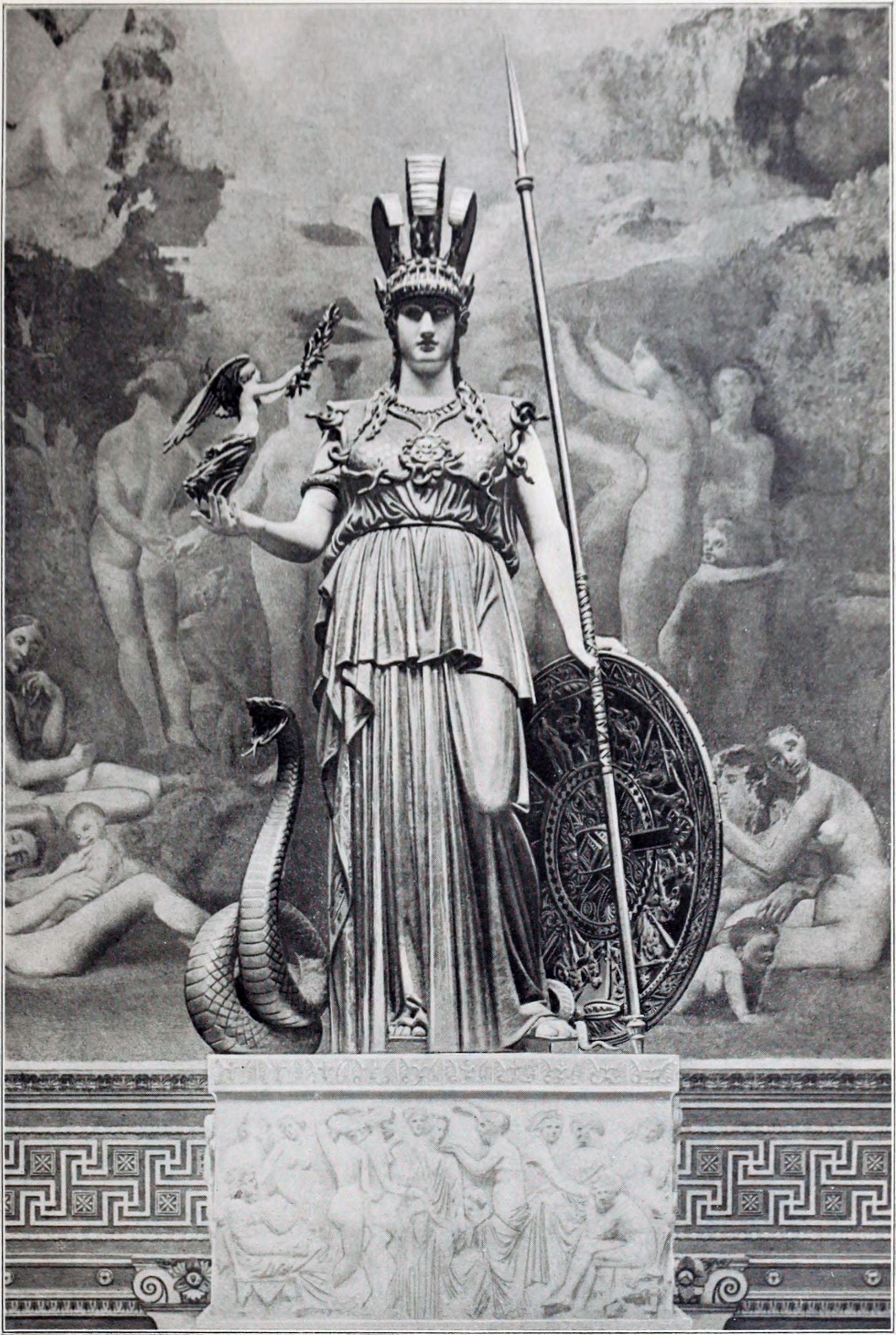
Minerve by Simart and Duponchel (1855)

The firm's masterpiece is the ivory and silver chryselephantine sculpture Minerve, commissioned by the Duke of Luynes for the salle des fêtes in his Château of Dampierre. The statue is a reproduction of the ancient Greek sculptor Phidias's Athena Parthenos, known to the Romans as Minerva. The sculptor Pierre-Charles Simart began creating the model in the spring of 1844, and the Maison Duponchel began its execution in 1846, finishing in 1851. Silver was used for the goddess's tunic and shield, and bronze for the serpent and weapons. Ivory was used for the areas of flesh: the goddess's face, neck, arms, and feet; the torso of Victory (held in the goddess's hand); and the head of Medusa on the shield. The concave side of the shield depicts the combat between the Amazons and the Athenians, and the convex side, a battle between the Giants and the Gods. The sandals depict the dispute of the Centaurs with the Lapiths. The repoussé and chasing was done by Delagrange de Lagny. The statue stands on a marble pedestal with bas-reliefs showing Pandora receiving gifts from the gods. The finished statue including the pedestal is more than nine feet tall, and it was exhibited at the Paris International Exhibition of 1855. To Duponchel's great annoyance, the organizers required him to exhibit the work in the Palais des Beaux-Arts, rather than the Palais de l'Industrie, which was drawing far larger crowds. Despite this, the piece attracted much attention, both at the exhibit and in the press, and it won a Medal of Honour.

== Later career ==
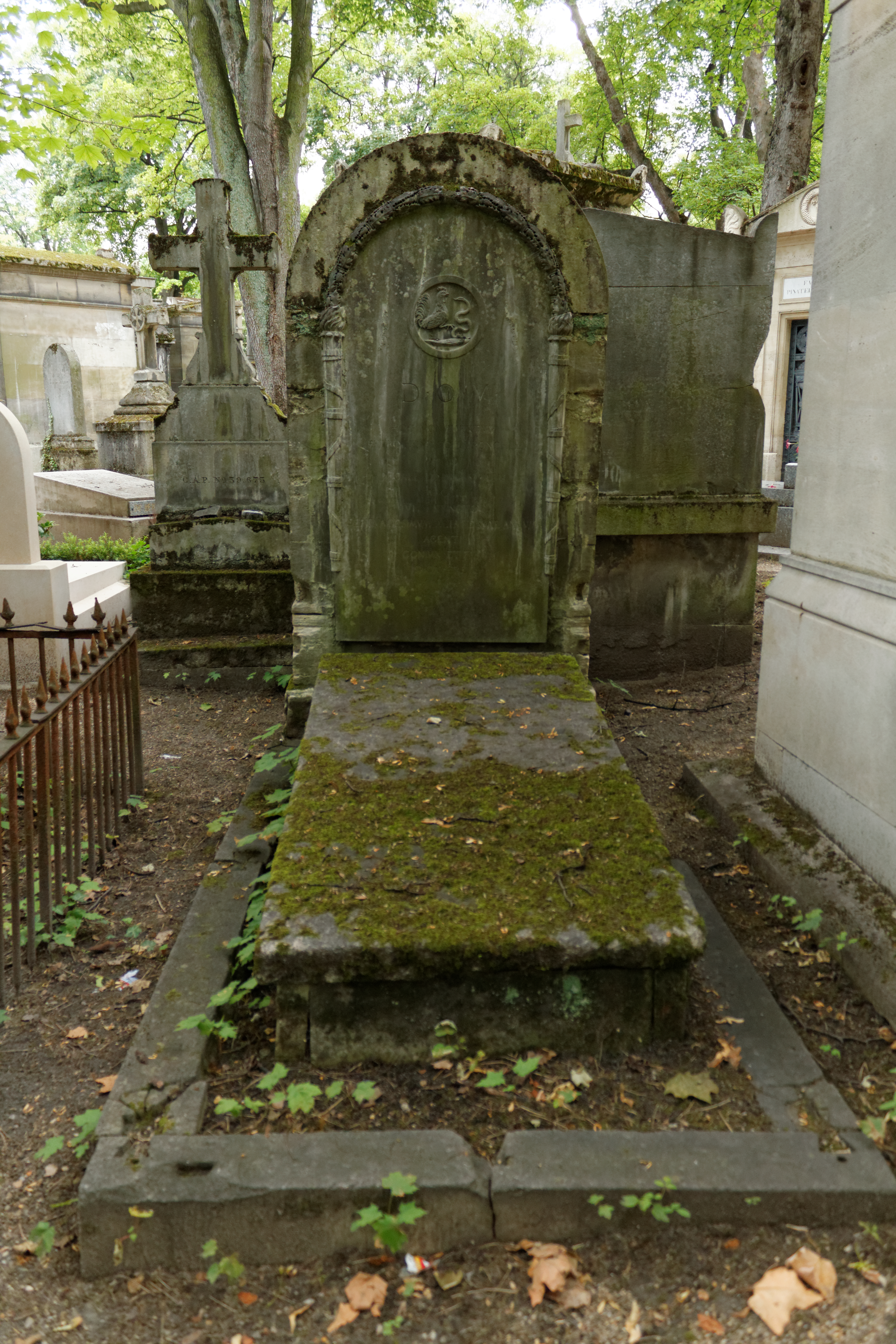
Tomb of Henri Duponchel in Père Lachaise Cemetery

Duponchel's gold and silver business remained successful, but architecture and opera continued to attract him. He collaborated occasionally with several of his designer colleagues from the Opéra, including Charles-Antoine Cambon, Pierre Cicéri, Jules Diéterle, and Édouard Desplechin, as well as Jean-Baptiste-Jules Klagmann. In 1854 he was again a candidate for director of the Opéra, but was not selected.

In 1861 Duponchel joined the Théâtre du Vaudeville as a scenic designer, with J. J. Dormeuil as artistic director and the entrepreneur Benou in charge of the financial side. He did not try to recreate the spectacular displays he had used at the Opéra, but rather continued to develop the realistic settings which had already been established at that theatre in the previous decade.

Duponchel was described by Heinrich Heine as "a thin, yellow man with a face like an undertaker." He died in Paris at age 73, and tried to leave his gold business, which was quite valuable, to his son, Ludovic-Maxime (born 15 October 1832). However, Ludovic's mother Marie-Joséphine Blanchard (1810–1896) gained control of it in November 1869, and it soon disappeared. Duponchel is buried at the Père Lachaise Cemetery.

== Honours ==
- Chevalier of the Legion of Honour (11 May 1839)

== Bibliography ==
- Boudin, Amédée (1868). Le Panthéon de la Légion d'Honneur. Tome II, obituary of Duponchel. Paris: Bureaux, 5 passage Chausson.
- Bouilhet, Henri (1910). L' orfèvrerie française aux XVIIIe et XIXe siècles. Vol. 2: L 'orfèvrerie française au XIXe siècle. Première période. Paris: Laurens. View at Internet Archive.
- Bourdin, G. (14 February 1861). "Concours public pour la nouvelle salle d'opéra", Le Figaro.
- Brault, Élie; Du Bois, Alexandre ([1893]). Les Architectes par leurs oeuvres (3 volumes, in French). Paris: H. Laurens. OCLC 457134263. Elibron Classics (2005–2006 reprint): OCLC 226396637.
- Brzoska, Matthias (2003) "Meyerbeer: Robert le Diable and Les Huguenots", translated by Christopher Smith, in Charlton 2003, pp. 189–207.
- Cairns, David (1999). Berlioz. Volume Two. Servitude and Greatness 1832–1869. London: Allen Lane. The Penguin Press. ISBN 978-0-7139-9386-8.
- Carlson, Marvin (1972). The French Stage in the Nineteenth Century. Metuchen, New Jersey: The Scarecrow Press. ISBN 978-0-8108-0516-3.
- Carnegy, Patrick (2006). Wagner and the art of the theatre. New Haven: Yale University Press. ISBN 978-0-300-10695-4.
- Charlton, David, editor (2003). The Cambridge Companion to Grand Opera. Cambridge, UK: Cambridge University Press. ISBN 978-0-521-64118-0.
- Chouquet, Gustave (1873). Histoire de la musique dramatique en France (in French). Paris: Didot. View at Google Books.
- Delaire, E. (1907). 1793–1907: Les Architectes élèves de l'école des Beaux-Arts, second edition. Paris: Librairie de la Construction moderne. View at Google Books.
- Dion-Tenenbaum, Anne (1997). "Multiple Duponchel", in Revue de l'Art, vol 116, pp. 66–75. ISSN 0035-1326.
- Énault, Louis (12 April 1868). La Vogue parisienne, 3rd year, no. 17.
- Gerhard, Anselm (1998). The Urbanization of Opera: Music theatre in Paris in the Nineteenth Century, translated from German to English by Mary Whittall. Chicago: University of Chicago Press. ISBN 978-0-226-28857-4.
- Guest, Ivor (1956). Fanny Cerrito: The Life of a Romantic Ballerina. London: Phoenix House. OCLC 4506387.
- Guest, Ivor, editor (1981). Letters from a Ballet-Master: The Correspondence of Arthur Saint-Léon. London: Dance Books. ISBN 978-0-903102-58-2.
- Guest, Ivor (2008). The Romantic Ballet in Paris. Alton, Hampshire, UK: Dance Books. ISBN 978-1-85273-119-9.
- Holomon, D. Kern (1992). "Berlioz, Hector" in Sadie 1992, vol. 1, pp. 434–439.
- Huebner, Steven (1992). "Duponchel, Charles (Edmond)" in Sadie 1992, vol. 1, p. 1279.
- Huebner, Steven (1992). "Robert le diable" in Sadie 1992, vol. 3, pp. 1357–9.
- Jacques, Annie (1986). La carrière de l'architecte au XIX^{e} siècle. Exposition-dossier du musée d'Orsay. Paris. Listing Archived 4 March 2016 at the Wayback Machine at the Musée d'Orsay website.
- Johnston, William R. (1985). "II Later Ivories" in Randall 1985, pp. 281–289.
- Kelly, Thomas Forrest (2004). First Nights at the Opera. New Haven: Yale University Press. ISBN 978-0-300-10044-0.
- Lacombe, Hervé (2001). The Keys to French Opera in the Nineteenth Century, translated by Edward Schneider. Berkeley: University of California Press. ISBN 978-0-520-21719-5.
- Lacombe, Hervé (2003). "The 'machine' and the state", translated by Christopher Smith, in Charlton 2003, pp. 21–42.
- Larousse, Pierre (1870). Grand dictionnaire universel du XIX^{e} siècle, vol. 6. Paris. View at Internet Archive.
- Ledru-Rollin; Levesque, J. A. (1847). Journal du Palais. Recueil le plus complet de jurisprudence française. Tome II. Paris: Bureaux, rue des Grands-Augustins, 7. View at Google Books.
- Letellier, Robert Ignatius (2007). Giacomo Meyerbeer: A Reader. Newcastle, UK: Cambridge Scholars Publishing. ISBN 978-1-84718-388-0.
- Marrinan, Michael (2009). Romantic Paris: Histories of a Cultural Landscape, 1800–1850. Stanford, California: Stanford University Press. ISBN 978-0-8047-5062-2.
- Mead, Christopher Curtis (1991). Charles Garnier's Paris Opéra: Architectural Empathy and the Renaissance of French Classicism, p. 185. New York: The Architectural History Foundation. Cambridge, Massachusetts: The MIT Press. ISBN 978-0-262-13275-6.
- Pitou, Spire (1990). The Paris Opéra: An Encyclopedia of Operas, Ballets, Composers, and Performers. Growth and Grandeur, 1815–1914. New York: Greenwood Press. ISBN 978-0-313-26218-0.
- Randall, Richard H., Jr. (1985). Masterpieces of Ivory from the Walters Art Gallery. New York: Hudson Hills Press. ISBN 978-0-933920-42-2.
- Sadie, Stanley, editor (1992). The New Grove Dictionary of Opera (4 volumes). London: Macmillan. ISBN 978-1-56159-228-9.
- Smith, Marian (2003). 'Dance and Dancers' in Charlton (2003), pp. 93–108.
- Tamvaco, Jean-Louis (2000). Les Cancans de l'Opéra. Chroniques de l'Académie Royale de Musique et du théâtre, à Paris sous les deux restorations (2 volumes, in French). Paris: CNRS Editions. ISBN 978-2-271-05685-6.
- Turner, Jane (editor, 1998). The Dictionary of Art, reprinted with minor corrections, 34 volumes. New York: Grove. ISBN 978-1-884446-00-9.
- Vapereau, G. (1858). Dictionnaire universel des contemporains. Paris: Hachette. View at Internet Archive.
- Walsh, T. J. (1981). Second Empire Opera: The Théâtre Lyrique Paris 1851–1870. New York: Riverrun Press. ISBN 978-0-7145-3659-0.
- Whiteley, John (1998). "Guérin, Pierre(-Narcisse)" in Turner 1998, vol. 13, pp. 791–795.
- Williams, Simon (2003). "The spectacle of the past in grand opera" in Charlton 2003, pp. 58–75.
- Zimmermann, Reiner (1998). Giacomo Meyerbeer: Eine Biografie nach Dokumenten (in German). Berlin: Parthas. ISBN 978-3-932529-23-8.
