= Asarta =

Scientific classification
- Kingdom: Animalia
- Phylum: Arthropoda
- Clade: Pancrustacea
- Class: Insecta
- Order: Lepidoptera
- Family: Pyralidae
- Subfamily: Phycitinae
- Tribe: Phycitini
- Genus: Asarta; Zeller, 1848

Synonyms
- Chionea Guenée, 1845

Genus of moths

Asarta is a genus of snout moths. It was erected by Philipp Christoph Zeller in 1848 and is known from Switzerland, Spain, India and Turkey.

== Species ==
- Asarta aethiopella (Duponchel, 1837)
- Asarta albarracinella Leraut & Luquet, 1991
- Asarta alpicolella (Zeller, 1839)
- Asarta alticola (Hampson, 1930)
- Asarta ciliciella Staudinger, 1879
- Asarta fuliginosa (Turner, 1941)
