= Jean-Valentin Morel =

French gold and silversmith

Jean-Valentin Morel (1794–1860) was a French gold and silversmith noted for the quality of his work.

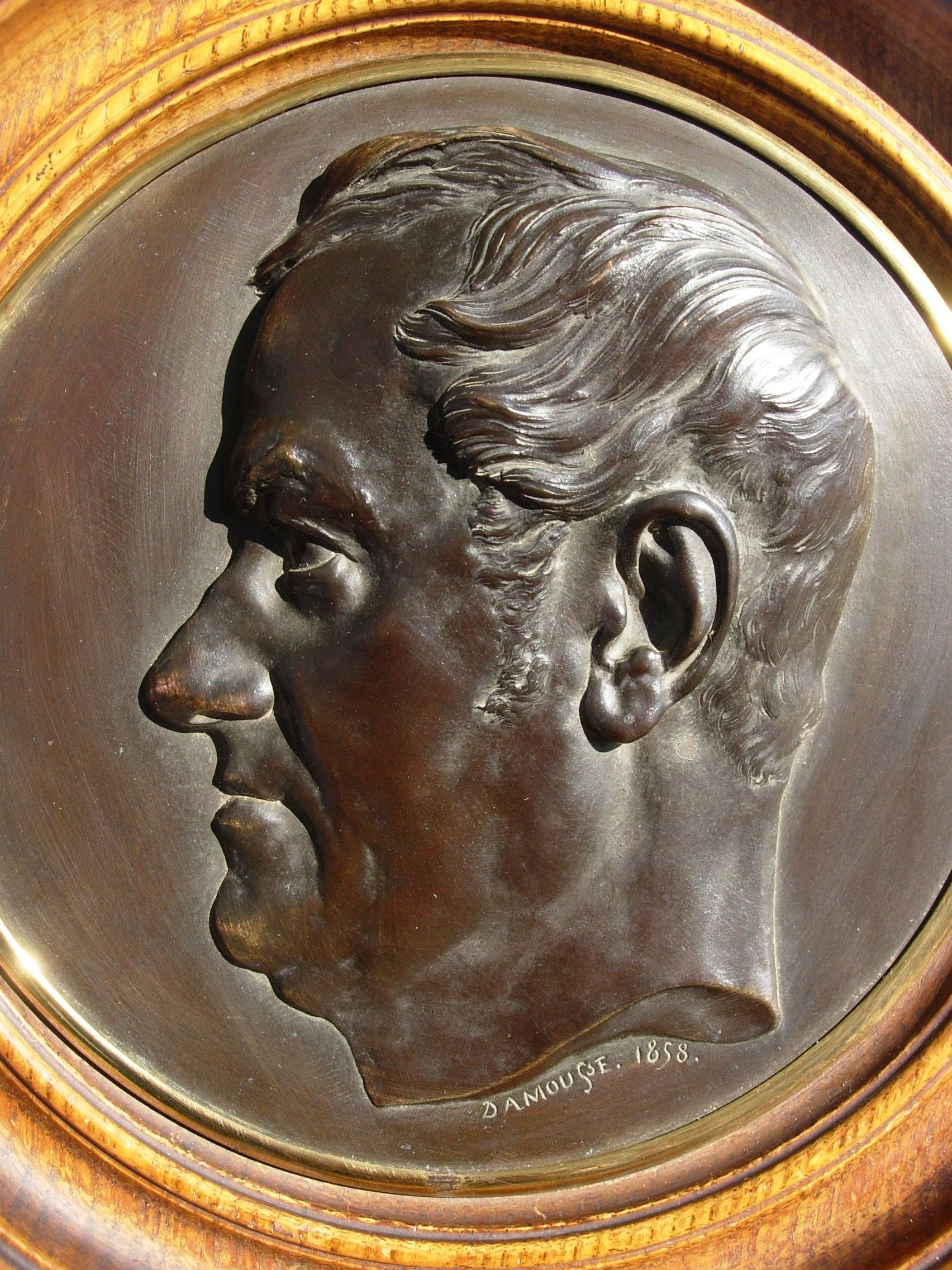
Bronze medallion representing Morel by the French sculptor Pierre-Adolphe Dammouse, 1858

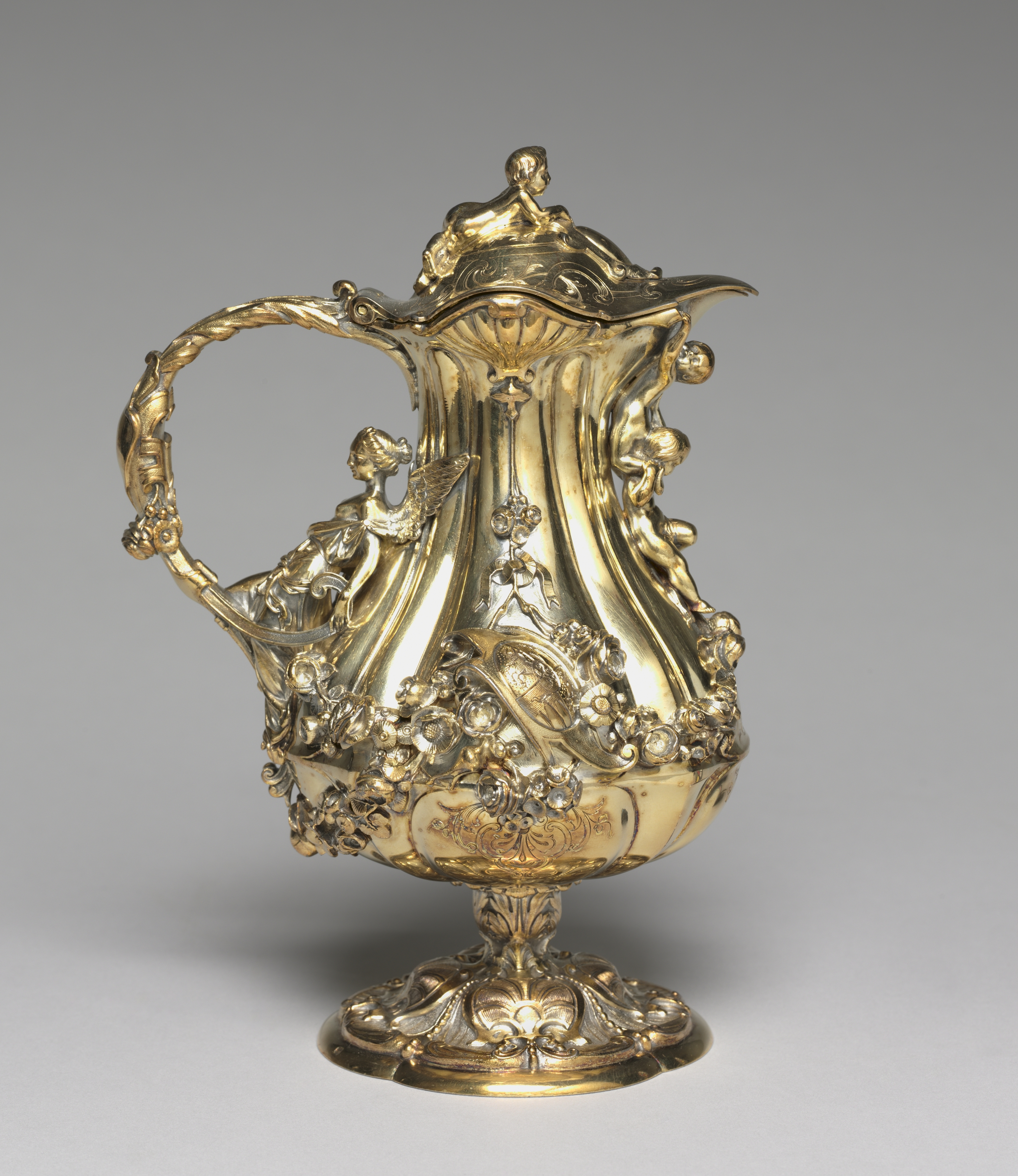
Covered Jug, c. 1845. Cleveland Museum of Art

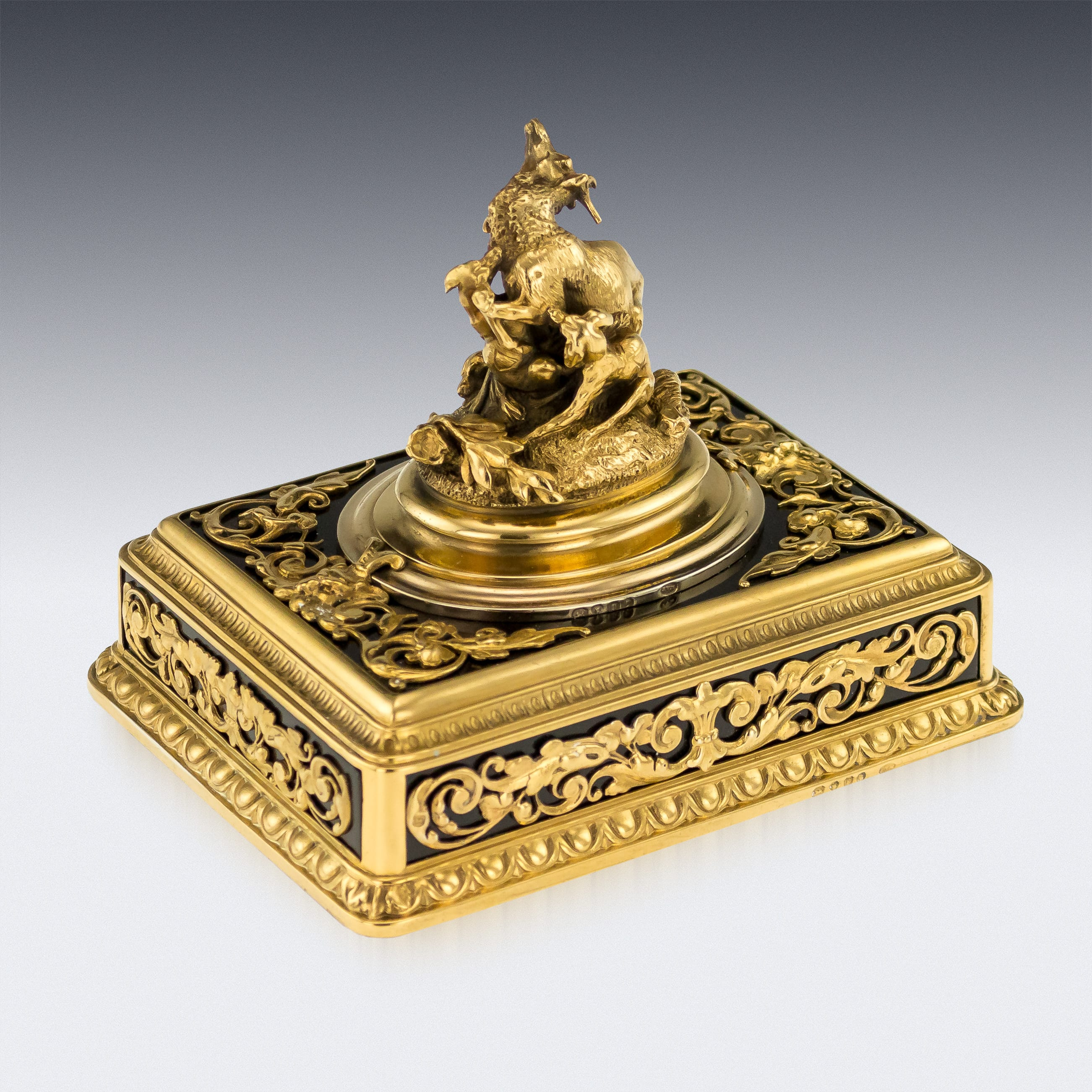
Silver-Gilt Paperweight c.1850 - Pushkin's

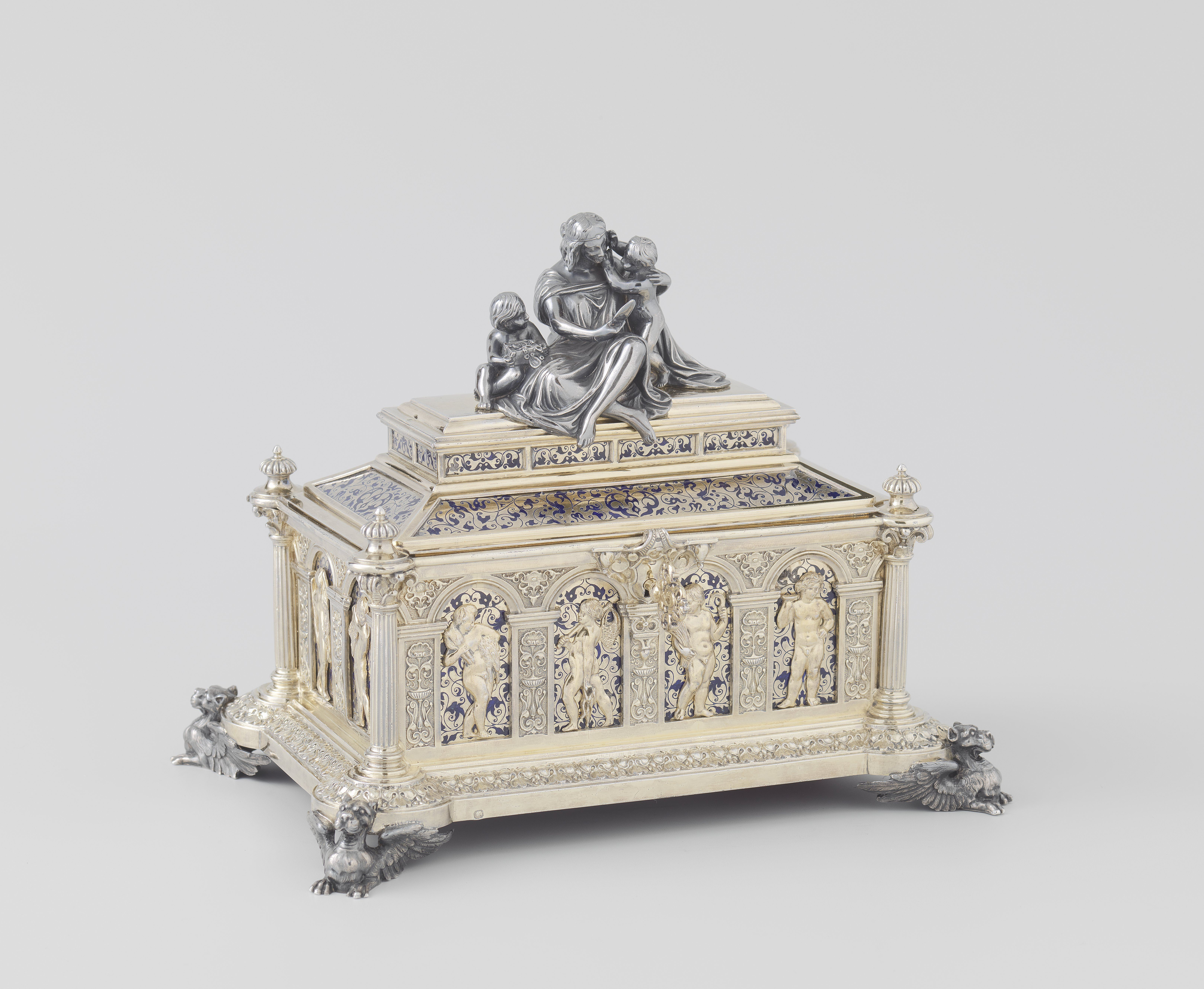
Jewelry Box, c. 1842-1848. Rijksmuseum

== Life and career ==
Morel was born in Paris. He was the son of lapidary Valentin Morel, and his mother's family were silversmiths. He learned the lapidary craft from his father and apprenticed with goldsmith Adrien Vachette who worked in the production of gold boxes. Morel opened his own business in 1818 and registered his first mark on August 2, 1827. After opening his own shop, Morel specialized in high-quality inlay and in the production of hard stone cups in a revival of 16th-century style.

At one time, Morel was forced to close his shop because of health problems and lost a year of work, but in 1834 he found a position as head of the workshop of Jean-Baptiste Fossin, where he worked in embossing on gold and hard stone. In 1842 he signed a contract with silver and goldsmith Henri Duponchel, establishing a craft shop called Morel & Cie which was highly successful and quickly gained an international reputation. The business produced such items as ornamental vases, jewelry sets, table silverware, a missal binding for Pope Gregory XVI, a table service for the King of Sardinia and works for the future William III of the Netherlands, the future Alexander II of Russia and the French patron of the arts Duc de Luynes. In 1844, Morel & Cie won a gold medal at the Exposition Nationale des Produits de l'Industrie in Paris.

The economic climate declined and the partnership was dissolved after disagreements. Duponchel filed a lawsuit in 1848 which prevented Morel from working in Paris, and Morel established a partnership with Jules Fossin and moved his business to London between 1848 and 1852. In London, Morel located his business in New Burlington Street near the Piccadilly firms of Garrard and Storr & Mortimer, but he found it difficult to establish an English clientele. He gained the support of French exiles from the 1848 Revolution, and was granted a permit as an official supplier by Queen Victoria. At the Great Exhibition of 1851 in London, Morel was awarded a Council Medal. He made a bloodstone jasper cup for English collector Henry Thomas Hope, with which he won the gold medal the Exposition Universelle (1855). The Hope Cup, considered a masterpiece of 19th century lapidary art, was purchased by the Musée d'Orsay at Sotheby's in February 2024. Despite this, he received only modest commissions and by the end of 1852, he was in difficult financial straits. He left London and opened a new workshop in Sèvres, France. Also in 1855, Morel was awarded the title of Chevalier of the Legion of Honour by Napoleon III.

Morel had a son Prosper whose daughter married Joseph Chaumet, who inherited the family jewelry business in 1885. It now bears his name. In 1860 Morel died in financial difficulties, after which Duponchel took over exhibition of his work.
