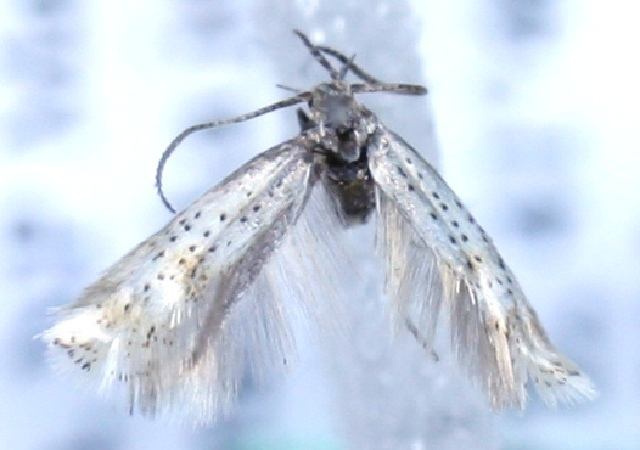

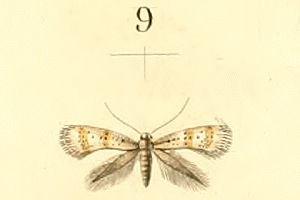

Scientific classification
- Domain: Eukaryota
- Kingdom: Animalia
- Phylum: Arthropoda
- Class: Insecta
- Order: Lepidoptera
- Family: Elachistidae
- Genus: Elachista
- Species: E. collitella

Binomial name
- Elachista collitella (Duponchel, 1843)

Synonyms
- Oecophora collitella Duponchel, 1843

= Elachista collitella =

Species of moth

Elachista collitella is a moth of the family Elachistidae. It is found in Great Britain, Spain, France, Italy, Switzerland, Austria, Germany, the Czech Republic, Slovakia, Hungary, Romania and Turkey.

The wingspan is 7–9 millimetres (0.28–0.35 in). The head is whitish. Forewings are whitish; costa towards base fuscous, with traces of a basal fascia; two broad partially ill-defined light yellow-ochreous fasciae in middle and at 3/4, more or less fuscous on costa, with some scattered black scales; dark line of cilia appearing truncate at apex. Hindwings are grey.

The larvae feed on sheep's fescue (Festuca ovina), crested hair-grass (Koeleria macrantha) and common meadow-grass (Poa pratensis). They mine the leaves of their host plant.
