= Le Ménestrel =

Weekly French musical journal, 1833–1940

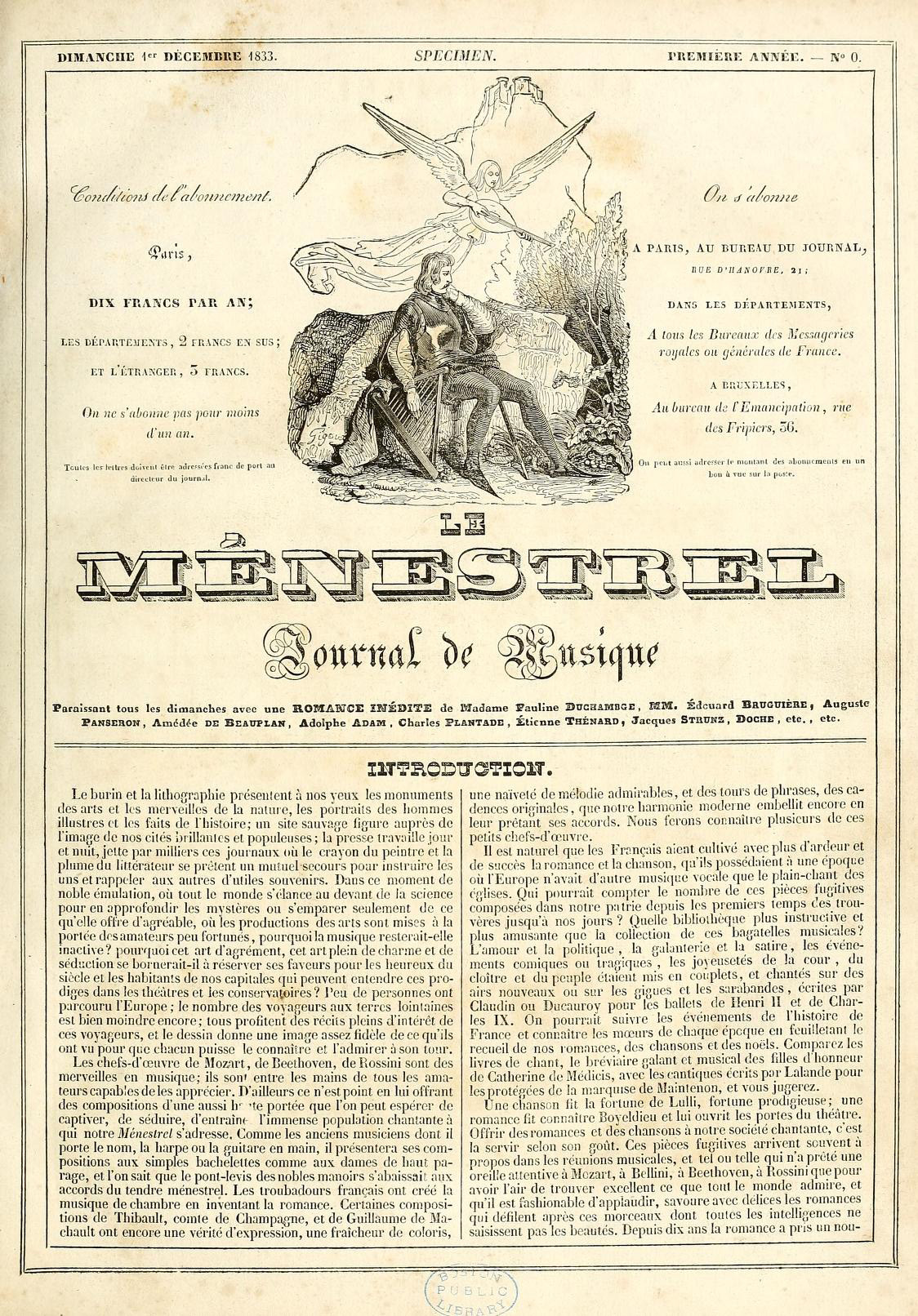
Front page of the first edition of Le Ménestrel (1 December 1833)

Le Ménestrel (French pronunciation: [lə menɛstʁɛl], The Minstrel) was an influential French music journal published weekly from 1833 until 1940. It was founded by Joseph-Hippolyte l'Henry and originally printed by Poussièlgue. In 1840 it was acquired by the music publishers Heugel and remained with the company until the journal's demise at the beginning of World War II. With the closure of its chief rival, La Revue et gazette musicale de Paris in 1880, Le Ménestrel became France's most prestigious and longest-running music journal.

== Publishing history ==
In 1827, François-Joseph Fétis had founded La Revue musicale, France's first periodical devoted entirely to classical music. By 1834, it had two serious competitors, Le Ménestrel established in 1833, and Maurice Schlesinger's Gazette Musicale, established in 1834. Le Ménestrel was founded by the Paris publisher Joseph-Hippolyte l'Henry, with the first edition (printed by Poussièlgue) appearing on 1 December 1833. In 1835, Schlesinger bought La Revue musicale from Fétis and merged the two journals into La Revue et gazette musicale de Paris. Until La Revue et gazette ceased publication in 1880, Le Ménestrel was to be its main rival in terms of influence and breadth of coverage.

E. D'Arlhac took over the directorship of Le Ménestrel in July 1835, but relinquished it the following March to the journalist and critic Jules Lovy, who had been a writer for the journal since its foundation. By 1836, Le Ménestrel had a weekly print run of 600 copies, although as Katharine Ellis pointed out, the number of actual readers was probably much larger. At the time, Paris alone had over 500 cabinets de lecture, private reading rooms and precursors to the modern library, popular in early 19th-century France, where for a small fee the public could read the latest issues of newspapers and journals. In 1840, the newly formed music publishing partnership of Jacques-Léopold Heugel and Jean-Antoine Meissonnier acquired Le Ménestrel. Heugel became the director, and Jules Lovy stayed on as editor-in-chief until his death in 1863. Lovy was succeeded by the critic and music historian Joseph d'Ortigue. Later editors-in-chief included Arthur Pougin who served from 1885 to 1921. However, after d'Ortigue's death in 1866, only the Heugel name appeared on the masthead. When Jacques-Léopold died in 1883, his son Henri-Georges Heugel took over as director. He was in turn succeeded by his own son Jacques-Paul who served as the director for the remainder of the journal's existence.

Le Ménestrel was published weekly for a period spanning 107 years, initially coming out on Sunday (later changed to Saturday and then Friday). The Franco-Prussian War caused publication to be suspended from late December 1870 through November 1871, and publication was suspended again for the duration of World War I, with the first post-war issue appearing on 17 October 1919. At the outbreak of World War II in 1939, the journal carried on until the invasion of France. The 24 May 1940 issue announced that, following the German attacks and the closure of theatres and concert halls in Europe and France as well as the Paris Conservatory, the journal was suspending publication with the hope of resuming in the autumn. In the end, it proved to be the last issue of Le Ménestrel. The Heugel company continued to operate as an independent music publisher until 1980 when it was sold to Éditions Alphonse Leduc.

Notable people who wrote for the journal include Henri Duponchel, Max d'Ollone, Alphonse Royer and Paul Collin.

== Sources ==
- Ellis, Katharine (2007).Music Criticism in Nineteenth-Century France. Cambridge University Press. ISBN 0-521-03589-9
- Feurzeig, Lisa (1994). "The Business Affairs of Gabriel Fauré" in Hans Lenneberg (ed.) The Dissemination of Music: Studies in the History of Music Publishing. Routledge. ISBN 2-88449-117-1
- Gautier, Théophile (1995). Correspondance générale 1865–1867 (edited and annotated by Claudine Lacoste-Veysseyre). Librairie Droz. ISBN 2-600-00075-5 (in French)
- Le Ménestrel (1 December 1833). Année 1, No. 0 (in French)
- Le Ménestrel (3 February 1933). "Cent ans d'histoire de la musique et du théâtre", Année 95, No. 5 (in French)
- Le Ménestrel (24 May 1940). Année 102, Nos. 19–21 (in French)
- Nichols, Robert S. and Drake, Jeremy (2001). "Heugel" in Stanley Sadie (ed.) The New Grove Dictionary of Music and Musicians, Volume 11. Grove's Dictionaries. ISBN 0-19-517067-9
- Watanabe, Ruth (1948). "The Pougin Collection", University of Rochester Library Bulletin, Vol. 3, No. 3, Spring 1948
