= Léon Charles François Kreutzer =

French composer and music critic (1817–1868)

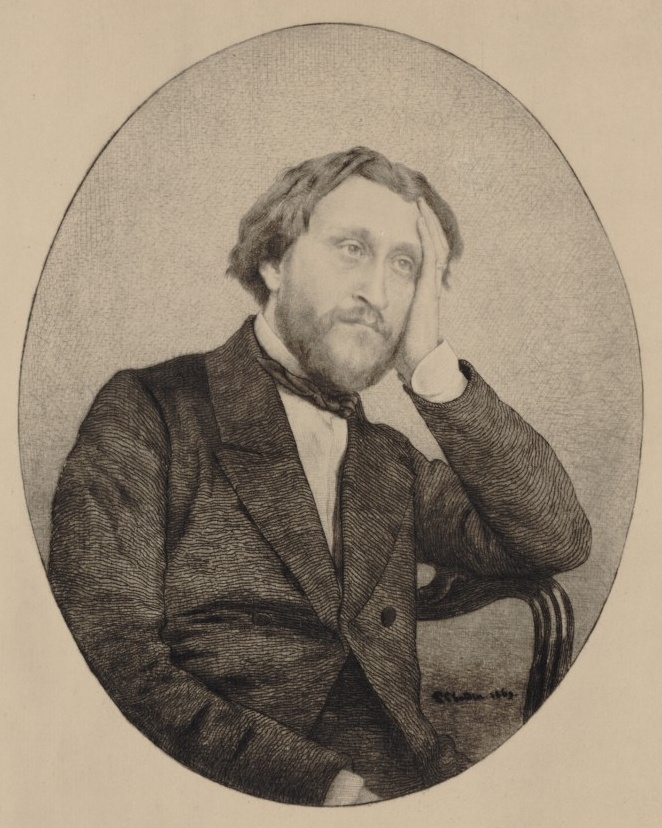
Léon Charles François Kreutzer

Léon Charles François Kreutzer (23 September 1817 – 6 October 1868) was a French music critic, music historian and composer.

== Life and career ==
Born in Paris, Léon Charles François Kreutzer was the son of composer and violinist Jean Nicolas Auguste Kreutzer. He studied piano and composition with his father and other private instructors. In 1840 he began writing for the French publication L’union on the history of opera, and other topics related to that art form. In 1849 he began working as a music critic for François-Joseph Fétis's Revue et gazette musicale de Paris; publishing a series of articles in that magazine from February 4 and September 23, 1849. After this he worked as a music critic for a number of 19th century French magazines, including L’opinion publique, Le théâtre, and Revue contemporaine (from 1854). He contributed several articles to the French language encyclopedia Encyclopédie du XIXe siècle (later published as Essai sur l’art lyrique au théâtre in Paris, 1849). These included articles on 'Opéra' and ‘Opéra-Comique' which were co-authored with Edouard Fournier.

As a composer, Kreutzer produced two symphonies, a piano concerto, approximately 50 art songs, at least 4 string quartets, and several keyboard compositions. These latter pieces included works for the piano and organ; including a piano trio and three piano sonatas. He also penned two operas which have never been performed, Serafine and Les filles d’azur.
