= Édouard Monnais =

French author and theatre director (1798–1868)

Désiré Guillaume Édouard Monnais (27 May 1798 – 25 February 1868) was a French journalist, theater director, playwright and librettist.

== Life and career ==
Édouard Monnais was born in Paris and began his career as a journalist. In 1835, he became chief editor of the Revue et gazette musicale de Paris. In 1836 he took a position at the Interior Ministry and in 1838 became Commissioner of Opera and soon afterward, the Paris Conservatory. From 15 November 1839 to the end of May 1841, he co-directed the Paris Opera with Henri Duponchel.

Monnais wrote as a critic for Revue et gazette musicale de Paris and Le Courrier français, during which time he reviewed the work of artists including Balzac and Verdi. He was active in the support of music and opera, serving as vice-chairman of the Association of Artists-Musicians, and also on juries, artistic committees and in support of competitions including the Prix de Rome.

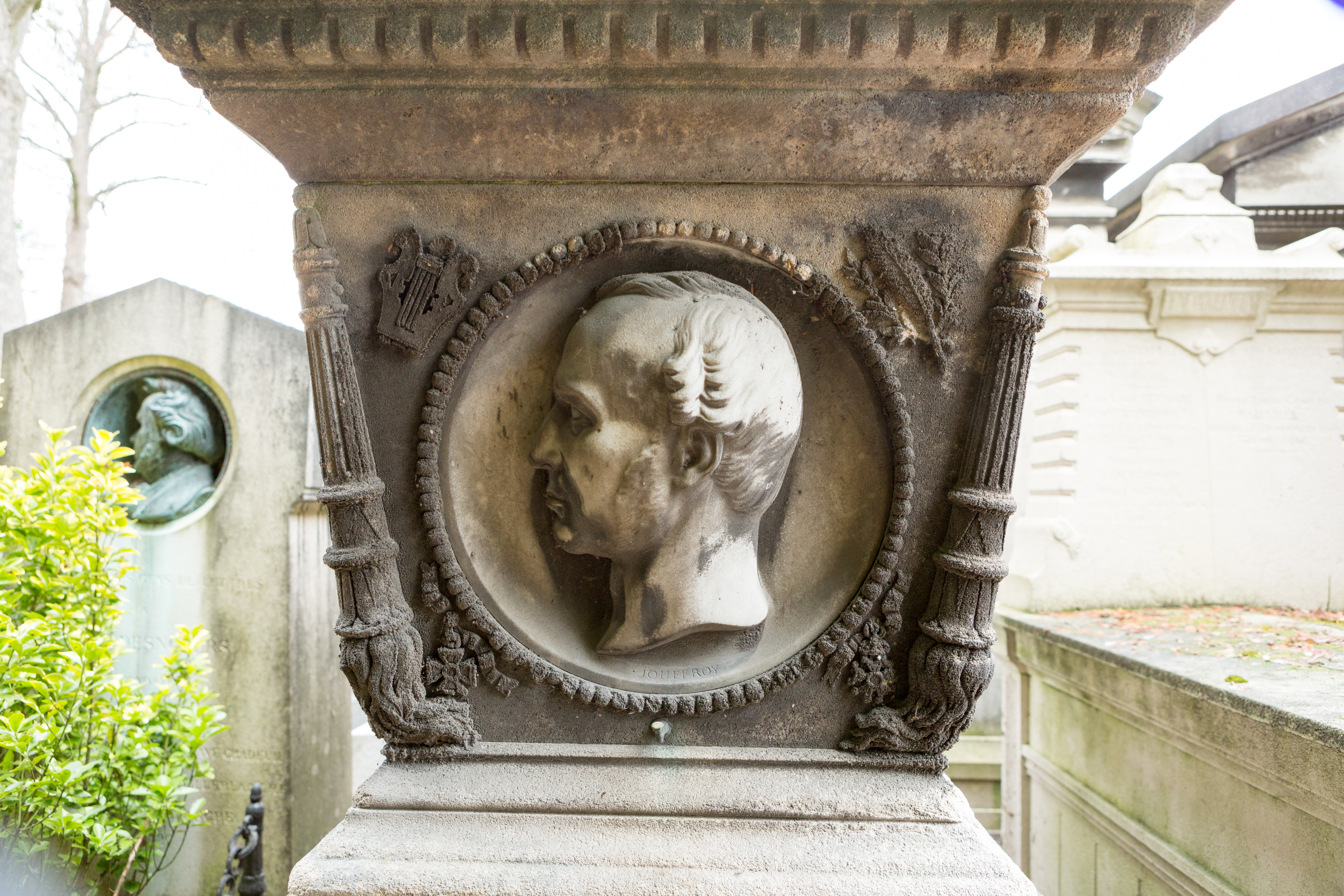
Bust on his tomb

Monnais sometimes wrote under the pseudonym of Paul Smith. He retired from public service a month before his death, and died in Paris after a lengthy illness. His funeral was held in the Notre Dame de Lorette and he was buried in the Père Lachaise Cemetery.

== Works ==
Selected works include:

- Midi, ou l'Abdication d'une femme, a comedy-vaudeville act in collaboration, Paris, Theatre du Vaudeville, Feb. 2, 1826
- Le Futur de la grand'maman, a comedy in one act, mingled with couplets, with Emmanuel Arago and Armand d'Artois, Paris, New Theatre, June 13, 1827
- La Première cause, ou le Jeune avocat, in a comedy-vaudeville act, with Paul Duport, Paris, Theatre de Madame, November 5, 1829
- La Contre-lettre, ou le Jésuite, a drama in two acts, mixed with song, with Paul Duport, Paris, New Theatre, Aug. 23, 1830
- La Demande en mariage, ou le Jésuite retourné, in a comedy-vaudeville act, with Emmanuel Arago and Armand d'Artois in Paris, Variety Theatre, September 12, 1830
- Les Trois Catherine, historical scenes of Henry VIII, vaudeville, with Paul Duport, music by Adolphe Adam and Casimir Gide, Paris, New Theatre, Nov. 18, 1830
- La Cour des messageries, tableau-in a vaudeville act with Auguste Lecerf, Paris, Theatre Ambigu Comique, April 10, 1831
- La Dédaigneuse, a comedy-vaudeville act, with Paul Duport, Paris, Theatre du Vaudeville, Nov. 18, 1831
- L'Anneau, ou Départ et retour, comedy-vaudeville in two acts, in cooperation, Paris, Theatre Ambigu Comique, Dec. 3, 1832
- Le Cavalier servant, ou les Mœurs italiennes, a comedy act, mixed with songs, with Paul Duport, Paris, Theatre du Vaudeville, April 25, 1833
- Le Capitaine Roland, comedy-vaudeville in one act, working in Paris, Theatre du Vaudeville, June 23, 1834
- La Dame d'honneur, comic opera in one act, with Paul Duport, music by M. Boileau, Paris, Opera Comique, October 4, 1838
- Un ménage parisien, a drama in two acts, with Laurencin, Paris, gym-Dramatic Theatre, June 12, 1839
- Miss Kelly, ou La Lettre et l'engagement, in a comedy act and in prose, with Paul Duport, Paris, Theatre de la Renaissance, 25 October 1839
- Le Cent-Suisse, comic opera in one act, with Paul Duport, Paris, Opera Comique, June 17, 1840
- Sultana, comic opera in one act, music Maurice Bourges, Paris, Opera Comique, September 16, 1846
- Mimili, ou Souvenirs d'un officier français dans une vallée suisse, 1827
- Éphémérides universelles, ou Tableau religieux, politique, littéraire, scientifique et anecdotique, présentant pour chaque jour de l'année un extrait des annales de toutes les nations et de tous les siècles, 13 volumes, 1828–1833
- Esquisses de la vie d'artiste, 2 vols., 1844
- Les Sept notes de la gamme, 1848
