= Asarta alticola =

Scientific classification
- Kingdom: Animalia
- Phylum: Arthropoda
- Class: Insecta
- Order: Lepidoptera
- Family: Pyralidae
- Genus: Asarta
- Species: A. alticola

Binomial name
- Asarta alticola (Hampson, 1930)

Synonyms
- Anousterunia alticola Hampson, 1930

Species of moth

Asarta alticola is a species of snout moth in the genus Asarta. It was described by George Hampson in 1930 and is known from India.
