= Asarta fuliginosa =

Scientific classification
- Domain: Eukaryota
- Kingdom: Animalia
- Phylum: Arthropoda
- Class: Insecta
- Order: Lepidoptera
- Family: Pyralidae
- Genus: Asarta
- Species: A. fuliginosa

Binomial name
- Asarta fuliginosa (Turner, 1941)

Synonyms
- Gauna fuliginosa Turner, 1941

Species of moth

Asarta fuliginosa is a species of snout moth in the genus Asarta. It was described by Alfred Jefferis Turner in 1941, and is known from Australia.
