= Gustave Chouquet =

French music historian, music critic and teacher

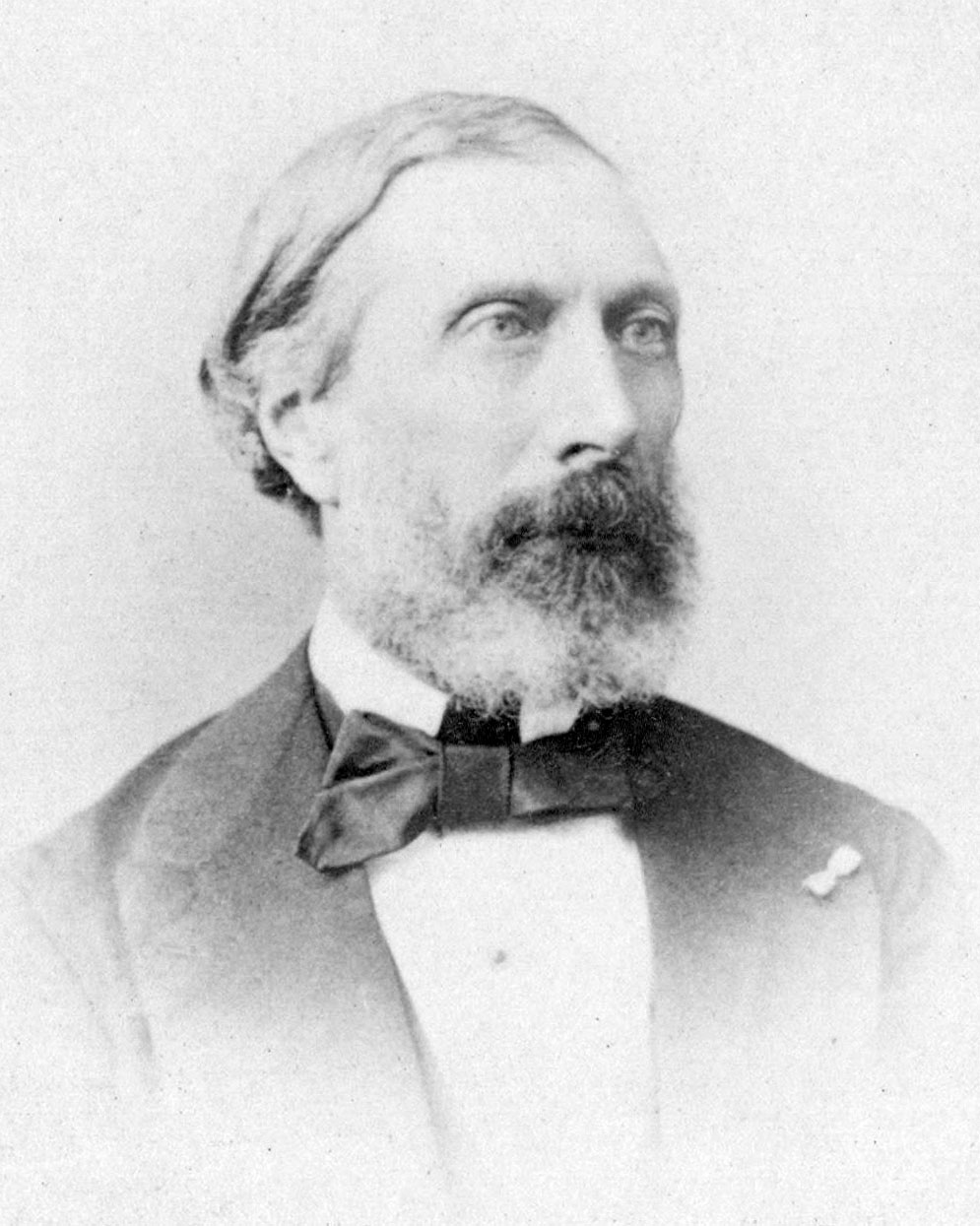
Gustave Chouquet

Gustave Chouquet (French: [ɡystav ʃukɛ]; 16 April 1819 – 30 January 1886) was a French music historian, music critic, and teacher of French.

== Early life and career ==
Born Adolphe-Gustave Chouquet in Le Havre, he spent six years in Paris studying at the Massin Institute, but devoted almost all his spare time to studying voice and piano and attending concerts at the Paris Conservatory. In 1836, after receiving his degree (bachelier ès lettres), he returned to Le Havre, where his father was a banker. The latter lost his fortune in creating a railroad company (from Paris to the sea), and in 1840 the family moved to the United States. Gustave produced his first essays of music criticism in New York. He was also a professor of French literature and history and published several textbooks of French language instruction. After sixteen years devoted to education, a respiratory ailment caused him to move back to France, where he spent several winters in the warm climate of Le Midi. By 1860 he was permanently in Paris.

== In Paris ==
In Paris Chouquet became a music journalist, writing articles for La France musicale and L'Art musicale, and occasionally contributed to Le Ménestrel. He also became well known as the author of a great number of texts for songs (romances), cantatas, choral scenes and pieces for amateur performance, including the words for the cantata David Rizzio (the examination piece for the 1863 Prix de Rome in Music with the Grand Prize awarded to Jules Massenet), the cantata Paris en 1867 (written for the Exposition Universelle of 1867, set to music by Laurent de Rillé and performed at the Opéra-Comique on 15 August 1867), and the words for the Hymne à la Paix ("Hymn to Peace") which won the poetry prize at that year's Exposition Universelle but which was never set to music.

Chouquet participated in a contest held by the Académie des Beaux-Arts, winning the Bordin prize in 1864 for his Histoire de la musique depuis le XIVe siècle jusqu'à la fin du XVIIIe siècle ("History of Music from the 14th Century to the end of the 18th Century"), which was never published (according to Arthur Pougin in 1878). Chouquet was awarded the prize a second time in 1868 for his history of French opera, which was published in 1873 as Histoire de la musique dramatique en France depuis ses origines jusqu'à nos jours ("History of Dramatic Music in France from its Origins to the Present Day"), which was recognized as one of the first important French works in the genre of music history and criticism.

In 1871 Chouquet was appointed the curator of the Musée Instrumental du Conservatoire (Conservatory Instrument Museum), which had been formed from the instrument collection of Louis Clapisson and purchased by the state. In spite of meagre resources, Chouquet was able to greatly expand the museum's holdings with numerous important acquisitions, including a collection of Native American and African instruments from Schœlcher, a deputy in the French National Assembly and another collection from a M. le docteur Fau. Chouquet published a catalog of the museum's collection in 1875 under the title Le Musée du Conservatoire national de musique, catalogue raisonné des instruments de cette collection ("The National Conservatory Music Museum: Annotated Catalog of the Instruments of This Collection") and a second edition in 1884. The catalog was updated with supplements by Léon Pillaut in 1894, 1899, and 1903, and the complete catalog was reprinted by Minkoff in 1993.

In 1872 Chouquet became a contributor to the Revue et Gazette musicale de Paris and an editor in 1874, continuing until it ceased publication in 1880. He was also on the editorial board of the Dictionnaire des beaux-arts and contributed numerous articles for the first edition of George Grove's A Dictionary of Music and Musicians (published in four volumes from 1878 to 1889). Many of Chouquet's articles continued to appear in subsequent editions of Grove's Dictionary until at least 1970.

Chouquet was made Chevalier of the Legion of Honor in 1870. He died in Paris.

== List of publications ==
- Chouquet, Gustave, editor (1846). Leçons et modèles de littérature française; ou, Choix de morceaux en prose et en vers tirés des meilleurs écrivains du XVIIe et du XVIIIe siècle, par M. Chapsal (entirely revised edition, augmented with biographical and literary notes and a large number of new extracts by the most illustrious contemporary authors). New York: R. Lockwood & Son. View at HathiTrust.
- Chouquet, Gustave (1854). Easy Conversations in French. New York: R. Lockwood & Son. View at HathiTrust.
- Chouquet, Gustave (1854). First Lessons in Learning French. New York: R. Lockwood & Son. View at HathiTrust.
- Chouquet, Gustave (1855). First Readings from Modern French Writers. New York: R. Lockwood & Son. View at HathiTrust.
- Chouquet, Gustave (1859). Easy Conversations in French. New York: R. Lockwood & Son. View at HathiTrust.
- Chouquet, Gustave (1867). Conversations and Dialogues upon Daily Occupations and Ordinary Topics … in French Conversation. New York: D. Appleton. View at HathiTrust.
- Chouquet, Gustave (1873). Histoire de la musique dramatique en France (in French). Paris: Didot. View at Google Books.
- Chouquet, Gustave (1875). Le musée du Conservatoire national de musique. Catalogue raisonné des instruments de cette collection. Paris: Didot. View at HathiTrust. View at the Internet Archive.
- Chouquet, Gustave (1880). Les instruments de musique : et les éditions musicales. Paris: Imprimerie Nationale. OCLC 314231924.
- Chouquet, Gustave (1884). Le musée du Conservatoire national de musique. Catalogue descriptif et raisonné. Paris: Didot. View at HathiTrust. View at the Internet Archive.

== Bibliography ==
- Blom, Eric, editor (1954). Grove's Dictionary of Music and Musicians, fifth edition (1970 reprint). New York: St. Martin's Press. OCLC 34631845.
- Ellis, Katharine (1995). Music criticism in nineteenth-century France: La Revue et Gazette musicale de Paris. Cambridge: Cambridge University Press. ISBN 9780521454438.
- Fétis, François-Joseph (1878). Biographie universelle des musiciens, supplement in two volumes by Arthur Pougin. Paris: Didot. Vols. 1 and 2 at Internet Archive.
- Grove, George; Charlton, David (2001). "Chouquet, (Adolphe) Gustave" in Sadie 2001.
- Pierre, Constant, editor (1900). Le Conservatoire national de musique et de déclamation. Documents historiques et administratifs. Paris: Imprimerie National. 1031 pages. View at Internet Archive.
- Sadie, Stanley, editor; John Tyrell; executive editor (2001). The New Grove Dictionary of Music and Musicians, 2nd edition. London: Macmillan. ISBN 978-1-56159-239-5 (hardcover). OCLC 419285866 (eBook).
- Wild, Nicole; Charlton, David (2005). Théâtre de l'Opéra-Comique Paris: répertoire 1762-1972. Sprimont, Belgium: Editions Mardaga. ISBN 9782870098981.
