= Asarta albarracinella =

Scientific classification
- Domain: Eukaryota
- Kingdom: Animalia
- Phylum: Arthropoda
- Class: Insecta
- Order: Lepidoptera
- Family: Pyralidae
- Genus: Asarta
- Species: A. albarracinella

Binomial name
- Asarta albarracinella Leraut & Luquet, 1991

Species of moth

Asarta albarracinella is a species of snout moth in the genus Asarta. It was described by Patrice J.A. Leraut and Gérard Christian Luquet in 1991 and is known from Spain.
