= Asarta ciliciella =

Scientific classification
- Kingdom: Animalia
- Phylum: Arthropoda
- Class: Insecta
- Order: Lepidoptera
- Family: Pyralidae
- Genus: Asarta
- Species: A. ciliciella

Binomial name
- Asarta ciliciella Staudinger, 1879

Species of moth

Asarta ciliciella is a species of snout moth in the genus Asarta. It was described by Staudinger, in 1879, and is known from Turkey.
