= Louis Clapisson =

French composer and violinist (1808–1866)

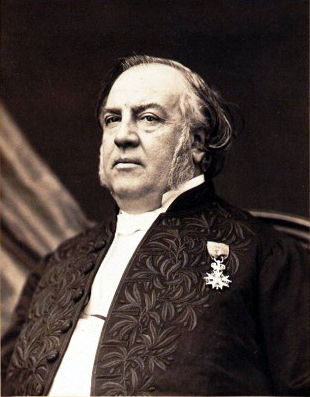
- Born: Antoine-Louis Clapisson; 15 September 1808; Naples, Italy
- Died: 19 March 1866 (aged 57); Paris, France
- Occupations: composer; violinist

Louis Clapisson (15 September 1808 – 19 March 1866) was a French composer and violinist. He composed numerous art songs as well as 22 operas, largely in the opéra comique genre. In his later years he was a professor of harmony at the Paris Conservatory and the curator of the conservatory's museum of musical instruments, many of which had come from his own large collection.

== Life and career ==
Clapisson's family was originally from Lyon where his grandfather had been a maker of wind instruments. Clapisson was born in Naples while his father Antoine was working there as a professor at the Naples Conservatory and as the principal horn-player in the orchestra of the Teatro San Carlo. The family returned to France after the Neapolitan War in 1815 and eventually settled in Bordeaux. Clapisson showed a precocious talent as a violinist. As a boy he toured Southern France, giving violin concerts under the tutelage of Pierre-Louis Hus-Desforges. In 1830 he entered the Paris Conservatory to study violin under François Habeneck and harmony under Anton Reicha. He also obtained a position as first violinist in the orchestra of the Théâtre-Italien and later as second violinist in the Paris Opera orchestra.

However, Clapisson soon decided to devote himself to composition instead. His first compositions were vocal pieces (quartets and duets) which were performed at the Paris Conservatory concert series from 1835. His first operatic work was La Figurante, a five-act opéra comique to a libretto by Eugène Scribe and Jean-Henri Dupin. It premiered on 24 August 1838. Twenty-one more would follow, almost all in the opéra comique genre, although he did produce one grand opera, Jeanne la folle, which premiered at the Paris Opera in 1848. His last work was an operetta, La Poularde de Caux. It was co-written with five other composers and premiered in 1861, the same year he was appointed professor of harmony at the Paris Conservatory. His most successful works were the opéras comiques La Promise (1854) and La Fanchonnette (1856). His contemporary, Gustave Chouquet, wrote:

[Clapisson's] style is somewhat bombastic and deficient in genuine inspiration; but, in almost every one of his operas there are to be found graceful and fluent tunes, fine harmonies, pathetic passages, and characteristic effects of orchestration.

Clapisson was made Chevalier de la Légion d'Honneur in 1847 and elected to the Académie des Beaux-Arts in 1854. In addition to his activity as a composer, Clapisson built up a notable collection of antique musical instruments which he sold to the French government in 1861. The collection was housed in the Paris Conservatory's museum which officially opened in 1864 with Clapisson as its first curator, a position he held until his death two years later.

Clapisson died suddenly in Paris at the age of 57, survived by his wife Marie Catherine née Bréard and their two sons. (Note: Clapisson and Marie Catherine Bréard were married in 1836. She was the granddaughter of Jean-Jacques Bréard.) His funeral at the Église Saint-Eugène was attended by the members of the Académie des Beaux-Arts and all the professors and students at the Paris Conservatory. After the service, his coffin was accompanied to Montmartre Cemetery by the band of the French National Guard.

Marcel Proust refers to him in his In Search of Lost Time.

== Selected recordings ==
- Aria from opera Gibby la cornemuse, Act I: Romance du sommeil. "Rêvons qu'un plus beau jour", with aria from Le Code noir, Act III: Romance. "Non, vous n'aurez pas… Adieu, toi ma pauvre mère" (Donatien). tenor Cyrille Dubois, Orchestre National de Lille cond. Pierre Dumoussaud, Alpha 2023
