= Asarta alpicolella =

Scientific classification
- Kingdom: Animalia
- Phylum: Arthropoda
- Clade: Pancrustacea
- Class: Insecta
- Order: Lepidoptera
- Family: Pyralidae
- Genus: Asarta
- Species: A. alpicolella

Binomial name
- Asarta alpicolella (Zeller, 1839)

Synonyms
- Myelois alpicolella Zeller, 1839

Species of moth

Asarta alpicolella is a species of snout moth in the genus Asarta. It was described by Philipp Christoph Zeller in 1839. It is found in France and Switzerland.

The wingspan is 17–19 mm for males and 14–17 mm for females.
