= Charles-Edmond Duponchel =

French military officer

- Born: 7 April 1804
- Died: 13 February 1864 (aged 59)
- Occupations: French military officer accountant and architecture
- Awards: Legion of Honour – Knight (1855)

Charles-Edmond Duponchel (7 April 1804 – 13 February 1864) was a French military officer accountant, in which capacity he served in Spain and Algeria. In addition, he studied architecture. He has frequently been confused by later writers with his contemporary Henri Duponchel, at one time director of the Paris Opera, who also studied architecture and has often erroneously been referred to under Charles-Edmond Duponchel's name.

== Biography ==
Charles-Edmond Duponchel was one of two sons of Marie-Joseph-Désirée Ravet and entomologist Philogène-Auguste Duponchel. In 1823 he entered the École des Beaux-Arts, where he studied with the architects Pierre-Théodore Bienaimé (1765–1826) and Léon Vaudoyer (1803–1872). He also joined the military in 1823 and served in the Spanish campaign that year. On 26 December 1855, he became a Knight of the Legion of Honour in recognition of his long career in military service.

Charles-Edmond Duponchel authored a number of works which have been misattributed to the former director of the Opera. For instance, in 1860 he wrote several documents under the name Edmond Duponchel which concerned the relocation of the Paris Opera. In these he explained his reasoning and mentions that for practical advice he had gone to see "M. Duponchel [Henri Duponchel], former director of the Opera and certainly the man most competent at this juncture in matters concerning theatre construction, considering that he is at the same time a great administrator and a great artist". He also prepared documents dealing with the Algerian question and proposals for barracks to accommodate troops, which have also been misattributed to the director of the Opera.

Charles-Edmond's brother Auguste was chief medical officer of the École Polytechnique. He edited and wrote an introduction for the 12-volume Nouvelle bibliothèque des voyages anciens et modernes contenant la relation complète ou analysée des voyages de Christophe Colomb, Fernand Cortez,..., which was published in 1842. He died in October 1846 less than a year after the death of their father.
