= Maurice Schlesinger =

German music publisher (1798–1871)

Moritz Adolf Schlesinger (30 October 1798 in Berlin – 25 February 1871 in Baden-Baden), generally known during his French career as Maurice Schlesinger, was a German music editor. He is perhaps best remembered for inspiring the character of M. Arnoux in Gustave Flaubert's novel Sentimental Education.

He was the son of Adolf Martin Schlesinger, founder of the music journal Berliner allgemeine musikalische Zeitung. Maurice moved to Paris permanently in the 1820s where he founded a music publishing house closely linked to that of his father. In 1834 he founded a society with the stated object of publishing both classical and contemporary music at reasonable prices. He published works by Mozart, Haydn, Weber, Beethoven, Hummel, Schubert, Chopin, Giacomo Meyerbeer and Hector Berlioz. He employed Richard Wagner, as an arranger and journalist, during the latter's first visit to Paris in 1840–41, and made the first introduction of Wagner to Franz Liszt.

Schlesinger created the journal Gazette musicale, which he later combined with the Revue musicale of François-Joseph Fétis. He eventually sold his portion of the journal in 1846 to a former employee named Louis Brandus.
