= Jean-Baptiste Fossin =

French silver and goldsmith and jeweler

Jean-Baptiste Fossin (1786–1848) was a French silver and goldsmith and jeweler.

== Life and career ==
The French house of luxurious jewelry Chaumet was founded in 1780 by Marie-Etienne Nitot in Paris. Nitot was appointed the Emperor's jeweler in 1802 and designed the coronation crown and the Imperial Sword. After the fall of Napoleon, Nitot and his son sold their business to their foreman, master craftsmen John-Baptiste Fossin. Fossin and his son Jules became noted for romantic jewelry inspired by Italian Renaissance and nature motifs including vine leaves, fruit and hawthorne, and successfully established a noble clientele. Fossin’s designs incorporated detailed botanical elements, including ivy, volubilis, olive, and chestnut leaves, as well as flowers like eglantine, hawthorn, jasmine, and geranium. For added realism, he introduced enamel techniques, particularly for green leaves, giving his pieces a lifelike appearance and dynamic visual effects highly. With his son Jules, he opened a shop on the rue Richelieu, where their artistry attracted both the nobility of the Faubourg St. Germain and the newly enriched bankers of the Chaussée d'Antin. Their international clientele included permanent residents in Paris such as the Russian Princess Bagration, the American Colonel Thorn and the Italian Duchess of Galliera.

Fossin was also responsible for crafting the emerald and diamond Leuchtenberg Tiara, a piece designed for Queen Hortense, daughter of Joséphine de Beauharnais. This Romantic-style tiara, able to convert into a brooch and six hair ornaments, later became part of the collection of George, Duke of Leuchtenberg. The tiara exemplifies Fossin’s ability to merge intricate design with functional elegance.

In 1837, Jean-Baptiste Fossin and his son Jules crafted several important pieces for the royal trousseau of the Duke of Orléans’ wedding. Their work contributed to their growing reputation among the French aristocracy. Fossin’s designs, which heavily drew from Renaissance and natural motifs, helped secure significant commissions for ceremonial items and jewelry for the French royal family, including pieces like the renowned Leuchtenberg Tiara, crafted for Queen Hortense. This tiara, made of gold, silver, emeralds, and diamonds, exemplified the romantic style and meticulous craftsmanship for which Fossin became known. The tiara also exemplifies the versatility of Fossin’s designs, as it could be worn as a brooch and six hair ornaments.

Fossin's son Jules formed a partnership with Jean-Valentin Morel to set up a jewelry business in London. The daughter of Morel's son Prosper married Joseph Chaumet, who inherited the family jewelry business in 1885.
