= Castil-Blaze =

French musicologist, music critic and composer (1784–1857)

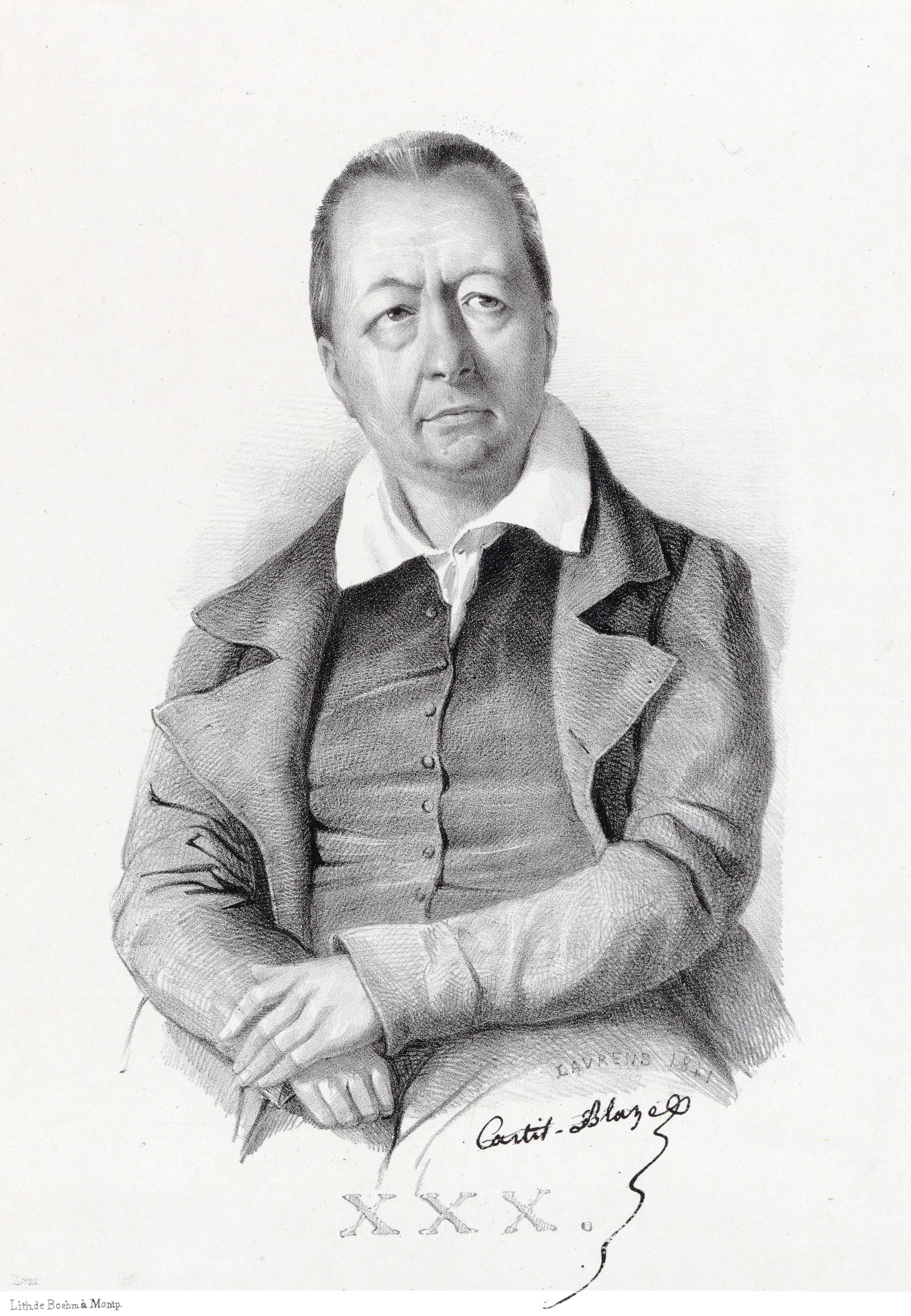
Castil-Blaze by Laurens, 1841

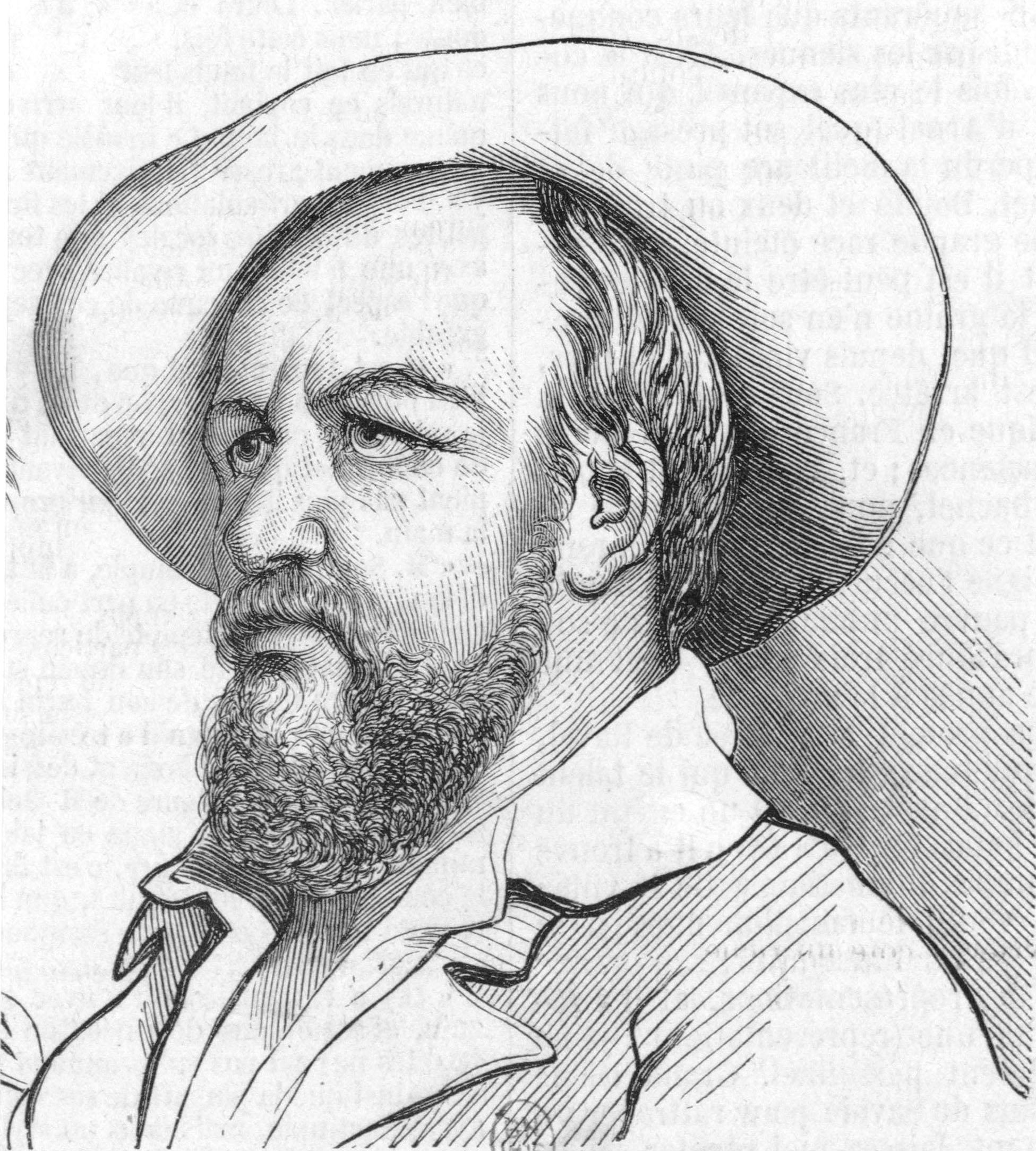
Castil-Blaze, 1852

François-Henri-Joseph Blaze, known as Castil-Blaze (1 December 1784 – 11 December 1857), was a French musicologist, music critic, composer, and music editor.

== Biography ==
Blaze was born and grew up in Cavaillon, Vaucluse. He went to Paris to study law, but also to learn music, at the Conservatoire de Paris. After having passed several more years in Vaucluse (southeastern France), Castil-Blaze moved back to Paris.

A large part of his activities consisted of adapting French and foreign opera for different stages in French provinces. In these cases, Castil-Blaze adapted the libretto as well as the music. This arranging work was highly criticized, but Castil-Blaze claimed that this permitted part of the public to become familiar with opera.

Castil-Blaze is mostly known as a music critic. Beginning on 7 December 1820, he published Musical Chronicles in the Journal des débats, signing his articles, which were often very controversial, 'XXX'. In these irregularly-published chronicles (about 30 per year), Castil-Blaze seemed to take certain liberties. Most of the chronicles criticized the lyric works, but others were dedicated to thoughts about music, to composers' necrologies (Weber in 1826, Beethoven in 1828), or to concert reviews. Castil-Blaze wrote for the Journal des débats until 1832 (his replacement there was Hector Berlioz), when he joined le Constitutionnel; he also collaborated in Fétis's Revue musicale (Paris, 1827), as well as other periodicals or reviews. He is, without a doubt, in France, the first music critic to have studied music.

He is the author of various books and articles on the theory of music, music history, and the history of the theater. He started a series of three works dedicated to three great lyric theaters of Paris: the Opéra National de Paris, the Comédie-Italienne, and the Opéra-Comique. He was only able to finish and publish the first two before his death; the third remains in manuscript at the Bibliothèque nationale de France and was published for the first time in 2012. Today, these works arouse the interest of historians, but also their distrust, because they contain numerous anecdotes that cannot always be verified.

As a composer, Castil-Blaze mostly made arrangements, but he was also the author of several original works, particularly of sacred music, of which there are two high masses. Finally, he worked as an editor, first for his own literary and musical works, but he was not limited to this: he was among the editors of the works of Beethoven.

He died in Paris.

== Literary works ==
- De l'Opéra en France. Paris: Janet & Cotelle, 1820.
- Dictionnaire de musique moderne, 2 volumes. Paris: Au magasin de musique de la Lyre moderne, 1821. 2nd ed., 1825.
- Chapelle-musique des rois de France. Paris: Paulin, 1832.
- La Danse et les ballets depuis Bacchus jusqu'à Mlle Taglioni. Paris: Paulin, 1832.
- Le Mémorial du Grand-Opéra. Paris: Castil-Blaze, 1847.
- Molière musicien, 2 volumes. Paris: Castil-Blaze, 1852.
- L'Académie impériale de musique de 1645 à 1855. Paris: Castil-Blaze, 1855.
- L'Opéra italien de 1548 à 1856. Paris: Castil-Blaze, 1856.
- L'Art des vers lyriques. Paris: Castil-Blaze, 1858 (posth.).
- Histoire de l'Opéra-Comique, unfinished, manuscript. Lyon: Symétrie, 2012 (posth.).

== Musical compositions ==
- Trois quatuors pour deux violons, viole et violoncelle, oeuv. 17. Paris: Lyre moderne, 1810. From Sibley Music Library Digital Scores Collection
- Trio in C, Op. 17 No.2 for three bassoons
- Wind Sextet No. 1 in E flat

== Bibliography ==
- Gislason, Donald Garth (1992). Castil-Blaze, "De l'Opéra en France" and the Feuilleton of the Journal des Débats (1820-1832). Ph. D. Dissertation, U. of British Columbia. UMI.
- Klotz, Roger (1965). Recherches sur Castil-Blaze, Thesis, Faculté des Lettres d'Aix en Provence.
- Lovy, J. (1857). "Castil-Blaze" (obituary), Le Ménestrel (20 December).
- Newark, Cormac (2001). "Castil-Blaze [Blaze, François-Henri-Joseph]" in The New Grove Dictionary of Music and Musicians, 2nd edition, edited by Stanley Sadie. London: Macmillan. ISBN 9781561592395 (hardcover). OCLC 419285866 (eBook). See also Oxford Music Online (subscription required).
- Féron, Séverine (2018). Castil-Blaze troubadour : https://journals.openedition.org/lengas/1742
- Séverine Féron, « Castil-Blaze, historien des institutions lyriques de Paris : sources et méthodes de l’Académie impériale de musique », dans Écrire l'histoire du théâtre. L'historiographie des institutions lyriques françaises (1780-1914), Séverine Féron et Patrick Taïeb [dir.], Territoires contemporains - nouvelle série [en ligne], 27 novembre 2017, n° 8, disponible sur : http://tristan.u-bourgogne.fr/CGC/prodscientifique/TC.html.
- Séverine Féron (2023). Les problématiques du français chanté au prisme du modèle linguistique de Castil-Blaze (1784-1857) : https://www.bruzanemediabase.com/node/15485
