= Philogène Auguste Joseph Duponchel =

French soldier and entomologist

Philogène Auguste Joseph Duponchel (1774 – 10 January 1846) was a French soldier and entomologist.

== Life and career ==
Philogène Auguste Joseph Duponchel was born in 1774 in Valenciennes, Nord, and died on 10 January 1846 in Paris. After studies in Douai, he joined the French Army when he was sixteen years old and took part in the campaigns of 1795 and 1796. Retiring from the army, he worked afterwards as a government administrator stationed in Paris. He was forced to retire again in 1816, aged 42 years, because of his opinions in favour of Napoleon Bonaparte. He then devoted himself to the study of insects.

After twelve years of effort, Duponchel finished in 1838 L’Histoire naturelle des lépidoptères de France, co-authored with Jean Baptiste Godart. This work consists of seventeen volumes (including twelve signed by Duponchel), 7600 coloured plates and 500 "boards" (which appear under the title Iconographie des Chenilles or Iconography of the Caterpillars). The volumes were published between 1832 and 1842, and within its pages the authors describe more than four thousand species of butterflies and moths.

Duponchel was one of the founders of the Société Entomologique de France and was its first treasurer. He was a very close friend of Pierre François Marie Auguste Dejean, Auguste Duméril and Pierre André Latreille. He married Marie-Joseph-Désirée Ravet (d. July 1847) and had two sons. His son Charles-Edmond Duponchel (b. 7 April 1804), studied architecture and was an accountant first class at the Ministère de la Guerre, and his son Auguste (d. October 1846) was chief medical officer of l'Ecole polytechnique. Philogène Auguste is buried in the cemetery of Montparnasse.
