= Auguste Alfred Rubé =

French painter and designer

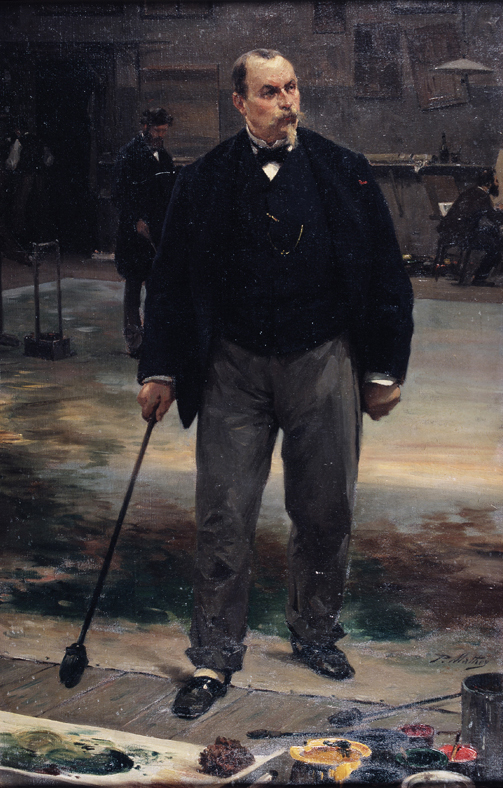
Portrait of the painter Rubé, decorator of the Opera by Paul Mathey at the Musée des beaux-arts de Brest.

Auguste Alfred Rubé (20 June 1817 – 13 April 1899) was a French painter noted especially for his theatre decorations.

== Biography ==
Born in the 9th arrondissement of Paris, Rubé was an innovator in the field of theatrical set design. This "decorator of rare ingenuity" focused on a local color search corresponding to the Romantic movement. He had been at a good school with his master Pierre-Luc-Charles Ciceri, the designer of the Opéra-Comique, whose daughter he had just married. Ciceri had the confidence of Alexandre Dumas, who reported to him and his students, Rubé, Charles Séchan, Jules Diéterle, Édouard Desplechin, but Rubé wanted to do even better: not only did he try to reproduce the landscapes accurately, he made them picturesque.

The setting of the 2nd act of Âme en peine, by Friedrich von Flotow to a libretto by Jules-Henri Vernoy de Saint-Georges, made for the Paris Opera, served him, in a way, as a premiere. The operas for which he then brushed the sets are masterpieces: in 1846, he created the set for the 2nd act of Donizetti's Betly. His fame dates back to that moment: the 1st act of Auber's Zerline; the 1st act of Halévy's Juif errant; the 4th act of la Fronde, by Louis Niedermeyer; the 1st act of Józef Michał Poniatowski's Pierre de Médicis; the 3rd act of Gounod's The Queen of Sheba; the 1st and 2nd acts of Meyerbeer's L'Africaine; the 1st act of Auguste Mermet's Roland à Roncesvaux; the 4th act of Verdi's Don Carlos; the 1st and 5th acts of Thomas's Hamlet; the 4th act of Gounod's Faust; the 1st act of Coupe du roi de Thulé, by Eugène Diaz; the 3rd act of Joan of Arc, by Mermet; the 3rd act of Delibes' Sylvia (ballet); the 1st and 5th acts of Massenet's The King of Lahore; the 3rd act of Gounod's Polyeucte; the 2nd scene and the 4th act of Verdi's Aida; the 2nd act of Charles-Marie Widor's La Korrigane; the 1st and 4th acts of Gounod's Le tribut de Zamora; the 1st act of Delibes' Namouna; the 1st act of Gounod's Sapho; the 1st and 4th act of Reyer's Sigurd; the 1st act of Messager's Les Deux pigeons; The 3rd act of Patrie, by Émile Paladilhe; the 2nd and 5th acts of Gounod's Roméo et Juliette; the 3rd scene of Saint-Saens's Ascanio.

He also created the set representing the Roman Forum in Louis Bouilhet's Faustine at the Théâtre de la Porte-Saint-Martin, the set of the Montmartre Cemetery in Edmond de Goncourt's Germinie Lacerteux at the Théâtre de l'Odéon, the setting of the mysterious park in Joséphin Péladan's Sphynx, at the Théâtre-Français, a night effect of the banks of the Seine near the Institut de France in Jean de Thommeray by Émile Augier and Jules Sandeau, in the same theatre.

In 1858, he had painted a superb ceiling for the Théâtre-Français, depicting Apollo riding on Pegasus among the characters who inspired the masterpieces of the tragic and comic French actors, which, consumed by gas, was repainted in 1879 by Alexis-Joseph Mazerolle. The last composition he worked on was the curtain of the new Opéra-Comique. The one at the Opera was also his.

By the time he died, at the age of eighty, Rubé had become the dean of painters and decorators. He had been made a chevalier of the Legion of Honour, on 14 August 1869. To those who regretted that his painting skills were limited to decoration, he replied with a good smile: "What do you want, I have theatre in my blood"!

Rubé died on 13 April 1899, in the 10th arrondissement of Paris.

== Judgement ==
He had, with his strong moustache, the appearance of a retired commander. His straightforward and highly ethical nature responded well to his frank and open face.
