= Gabrielle Krauss =

French operatic soprano (1842–1906)

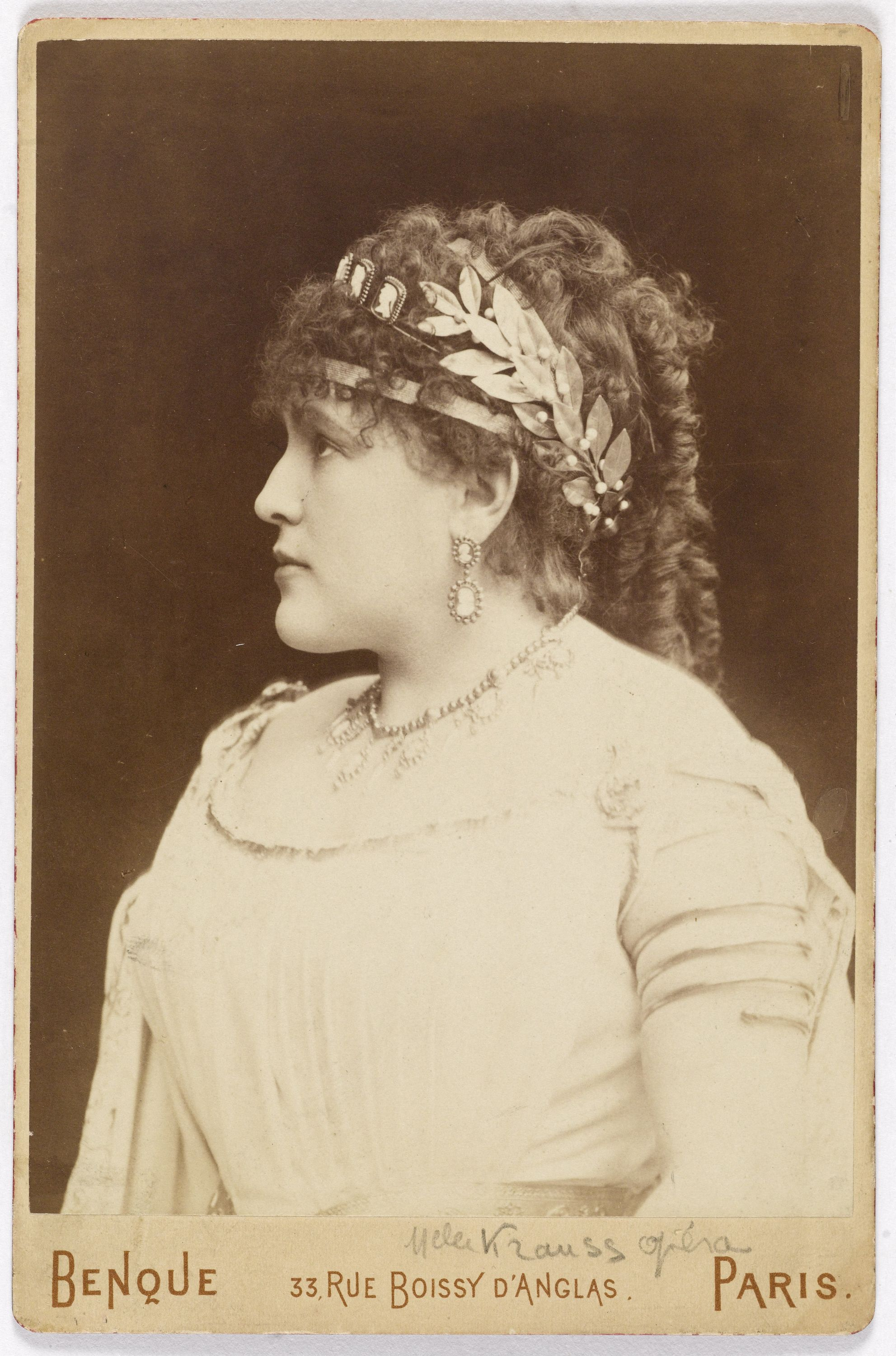
Gabrielle Krauss (photo by Wilhelm Benque)

Marie-Gabrielle Krauss (24 March 1842 – 6 January 1906) was an important 19th century Austrian-born French operatic soprano. She created major roles in operas by Anton Rubinstein, Charles Gounod, Camille Saint-Saëns, Auguste Mermet, Clémence de Grandval, Errico Petrella, Antônio Carlos Gomes and Émile Paladilhe. She also created roles in local premieres of Verdi and Wagner operas. Krauss was a leading soprano at the Paris Opera for 13 years, and also sang with great success in Italy and Russia.

== Biography ==
Krauss was born in Vienna, Austrian Empire, in 1842, and studied at the Vienna Conservatory and privately with Mathilde Marchesi (whose birthday she shared).

Her first important appearance was in Schumann's cantata Das Paradies und die Peri in Vienna on 1 March 1858, when she was still only 15 years old. In July 1859, she made her operatic debut as Mathilde in Rossini's William Tell. On 23 February 1861, she created the role of Maria in Anton Rubinstein's opera Die Kinder der Heide at the Kärntnertor Theatre. She sang in Vienna until 1867, her other roles there including Anna in Boieldieu's La dame blanche and Valentine in Meyerbeer's Les Huguenots.

Her French debut came in Paris on 6 April 1867 at the Theatre-Italien, as Leonora in Verdi's Il trovatore. She later appeared there in the title role in Donizetti's Lucrezia Borgia, Ginevra in Halévy's Guido et Ginevra, and other roles such as Donna Anna, Fidelio, Norma, Lucia, Semiramide and Gilda. She created a role in Clémence de Grandval's opera Piccolino on 25 November 1869.

Italy first saw Krauss in Naples in 1872, when she created a role in Errico Petrella's Manfredo, an opera based on Lord Byron's poem Manfred. The production was a great success and the composer was presented with a silver crown. She also created a character in Petrella's Bianca Orsini (4 April 1874) and sang in Verdi's Aida. On 16 February 1873, she created the title role in Antônio Carlos Gomes' Fosca at its premiere at La Scala, Milan, which also starred Victor Maurel. She created Elsa in the first production in Milan of Wagner's Lohengrin (30 March 1873), in which Maurel also sang.

She returned to Paris in 1873, and also sang in Saint Petersburg and Moscow in 1874. Her "Grand Farewell Concert" at the Bolshoi Theatre included excerpts from Rossini's Stabat Mater, an aria from Mozart's The Marriage of Figaro and Leonore's recitative and aria from Act I of Beethoven's Fidelio.

Krauss first sang at the Paris Opera on 5 January 1875, the opening night of the Palais Garnier, as Rachel in the first two acts of Halévy's La Juive, and then again on 8 January in the complete opera. On 5 April 1876, she created the title role in the first world premiere to be presented at the Palais Garnier, Auguste Mermet's Joan of Arc. The opera was not successful, closing after only 15 performances, but Tchaikovsky used Mermet's libretto as one of the sources for his opera The Maid of Orleans.

Krauss also created Pauline in Gounod's Polyeucte (7 October 1878); Hermosa in his Le tribut de Zamora (1 April 1881; her patriotic aria "Debout! enfants de l'Ibérie!" had to be encored); the title role in the revised version of Sapho (2 April 1884, under the composer's baton; Léon Melchissédec and Pol Plançon were also in the cast); and Catherine d'Aragon in Saint-Saëns' Henry VIII (5 March 1883). She sang in the Palais Garnier premieres of Aida (title role; 22 March 1880), Rigoletto (Gilda; 2 March 1885), and Émile Paladilhe's Patrie! (Dolores, 20 December 1886). She remained with the company until 1888, apart from a short period in 1885/86, singing leading roles in over 40 operas.

Tchaikovsky saw her in Paris in Weber's Der Freischütz in 1879 and wrote a glowing review of her performance as Agatha, while criticising other aspects of the production.

Krauss became as much renowned for her acting ability as for her singing, and she was popularly known as "La Rachel chantante". In 1876, Jean-Baptiste Faure dedicated his valse-légende "Stella" to her.

After retiring from the opera stage, she continued to give recitals and became a teacher. Krauss died in Paris in 1906, aged 63.

Her niece Clementine Krauss, a dancer in the Vienna Imperial Opera Ballet and later a leading actress and operetta singer, was the mother of the conductor Clemens Krauss.

== Premieres ==
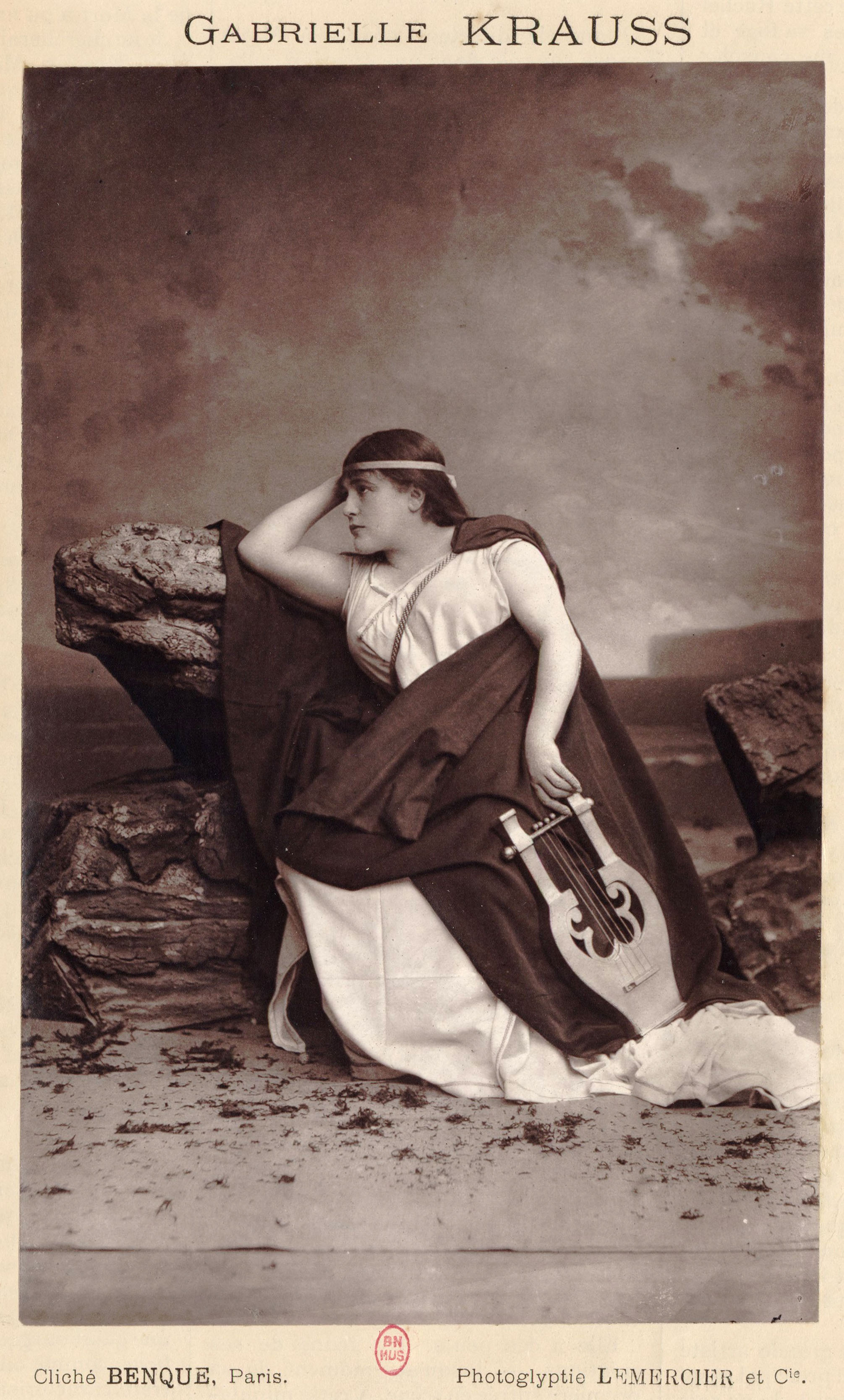
Gabrielle Krauss in the title role in Gounod's Sapho (revised version) - Paris

The operatic roles that Krauss created were:

- Anton Rubinstein: Maria in Die Kinder der Heide, Kärntnertor Theatre, Vienna, 23 February 1861
- Clémence de Grandval: unnamed role in Piccolino, Paris, 25 November 1869
- Errico Petrella: unnamed role in Manfredo, Naples, 1872
- Antônio Carlos Gomes: title role in Fosca, La Scala, Milan, 16 February 1873
- Petrella: unnamed role in Bianca Orsini, Naples, 4 April 1874
- Auguste Mermet: title role in Joan of Arc, Palais Garnier, Paris Opera, 5 April 1876
- Charles Gounod: Pauline in Polyeucte, Palais Garnier, 7 October 1878
- Gounod: Hermosa in Le tribut de Zamora, Palais Garnier, 1 April 1881
- Camille Saint-Saëns: Catherine d'Aragon in Henry VIII, Palais Garnier, 5 March 1883
- Gounod: title role in Sapho (revised version), Palais Garnier, 2 April 1884.
