= Eugène Caron =

French operatic baritone

Eugène-Charles Caron (4 November 1834 – 1903) was a French operatic baritone. He made his stage debut in 1862 as Count di Luna in Verdi's Le trouvère. Caron sang leading roles at the Paris Opera for 25 years, including the world premieres of operas by Auguste Mermet and Victorin de Joncières and an oratorio by Jules Massenet.

A street in Courbevoie was named after him.

== Life and career ==
Caron was born in Rouen on 4 November 1834. In 1848, at the age of 14, he entered the French civil service and worked in the Prefecture of Seine-Inférieure until 1861 when he decided to pursue a career as a singer. He was admitted to the Paris Conservatory and in the summer of 1861 won one of the three First Prizes in singing. The correspondent for Dwight's Journal of Music, who attended the competition, wrote:

M. Caron, is a barytone verging on the tenor. He is well versed in the resources of his art, and sings with animation. His face is good, too, as regards expression.

After studying singing with Paul Laget and declamation with Nicolas Levasseur, Caron graduated from the Conservatory in 1862, winning the First Prize in opera. He was engaged by the Paris Opera that same year and made his official debut on 26 September 1862 as Count di Luna in a revival of Verdi's Le trouvère. He went on to sing leading baritone roles with the company in a career spanning 25 years and created the roles of Maître Jean in Mermet's Jeanne d'Arc (1876) and Enguerrand in Joncières's La reine Berthe (1878). His other roles with the company included: Ashton in Lucie de Lammermoor, Guy de Montfort in Les vêpres siciliennes, Raimbaud in Le comte Ory, Masetto in Don Giovanni, Nélusko in L'Africaine, Kilian in Der Freischütz, Alphonse in La favorite, Le Comte de Nevers in Les Huguenots, Hadjar in Le tribut de Zamora, and Valentin in Faust.

Caron also sang in the world premieres of oratorios by Théodore Dubois (Les sept paroles du Christ, Saint Clotilde Basilica, 1867) and Jules Massenet (La Vierge, Palais Garnier, 1880) and performed as a soloist in concerts of the Société des Concerts du Conservatoire, of which he was member from 1865 until 1873. He retired from the Paris Opera in 1886 and afterwards taught singing until three years before his death in 1903.
