= Sapho (Gounod) =

Opera by Charles Gounod

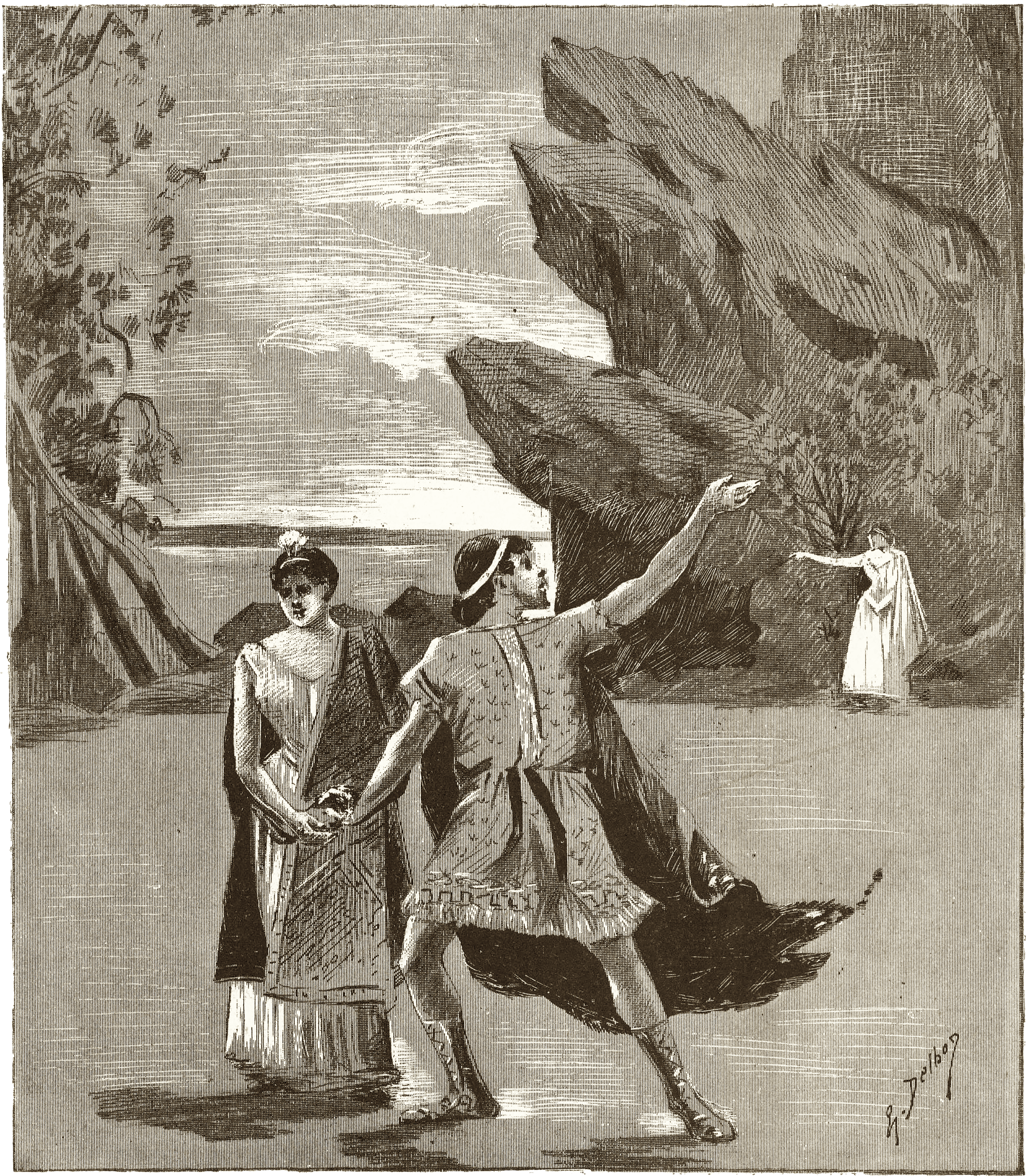
Sapho, Glycère, and Phaon in Act 5 of Sapho by Gounod (1851)

Sapho is an opera in three acts by Charles Gounod, premiered 16 April 1851 at Salle Le Peletier of the Paris Opera. The libretto was by Émile Augier after the life of the poet Sappho of Lesbos. The creation of the work was given an impetus by, and provided a central role for, the mezzo-soprano Pauline Viardot.

It was presented only nine times in its initial production, but was a succès d'estime for the young composer, with the critics praising Act 3 in particular. It was later revised to two acts on 26 July 1858, and revised again to 4 acts at the Palais Garnier on 2 April 1884, achieving a total of 48 performances.

== Background ==
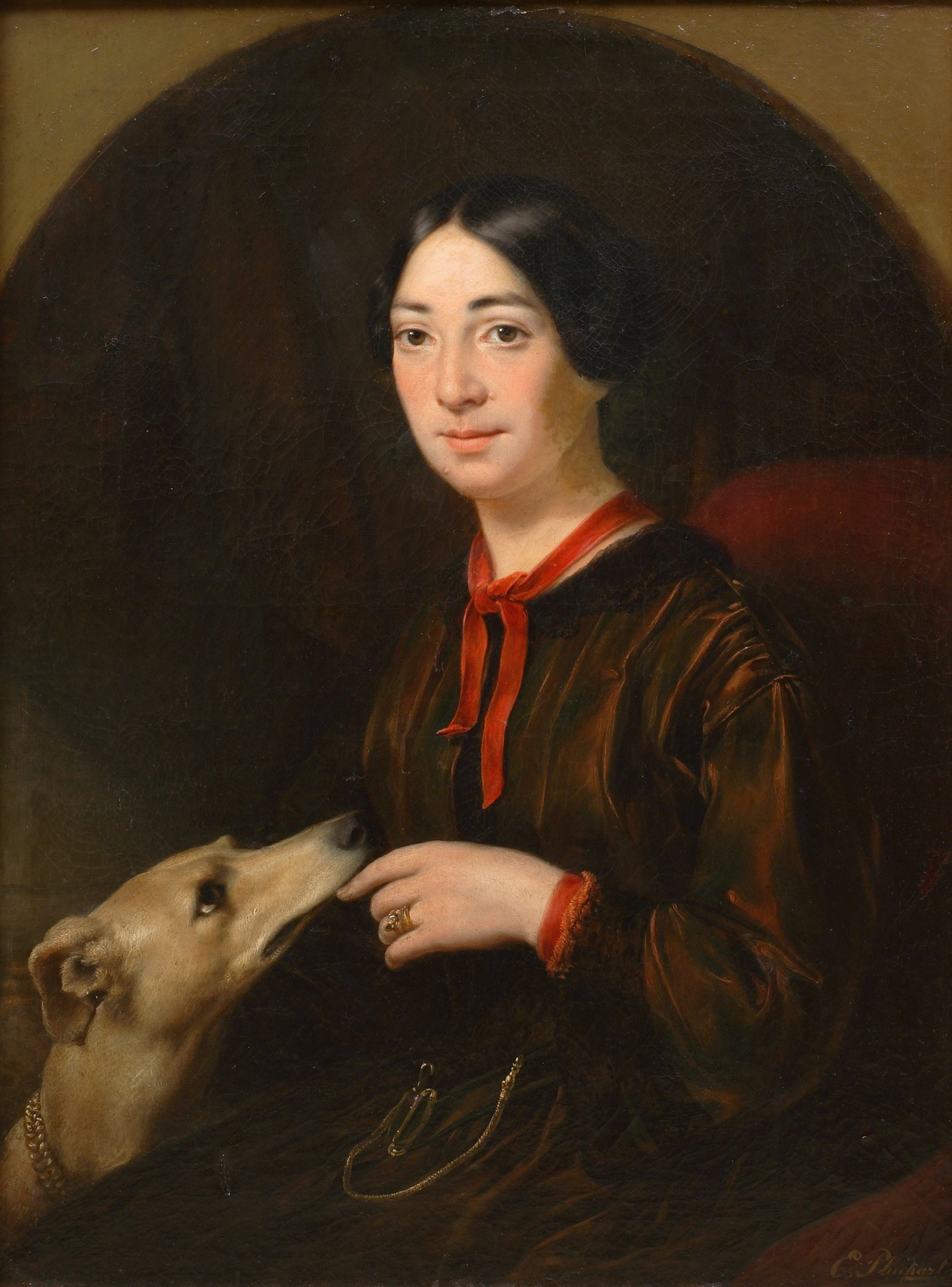
Pauline Viardot

The impetus for the composition of Gounod's first opera, and its acceptance for performance at France's premiere opera house, was primarily due to the influence of Pauline Viardot, who met the young composer in January or February 1850, shortly after her triumph there in Meyerbeer's Le prophète. In his memoirs Gounod relates that the violinist François Seghers, who at that time was the leader of the Concerts de la Société Sainte-Cécile on the Rue Chaussée-d'Antin, had presented some pieces by Gounod which had made a favorable impression. The Viardot family knew Seghers and through him Gounod received an invitation to play several of his compositions on the piano so they could hear them. After several hours Pauline Viardot asked Gounod why he had not yet written an opera. He responded that he did not have a libretto. When she asked with whom he might like to work, he mentioned that although he had known Augier in childhood, the latter had now become far more famous than he and would hardly care to risk working with someone with whom he had only played hoops. Viardot immediately told Gounod to seek out Augier and tell him that she would take the responsibility to sing the principal role in Gounod's opera, if Augier would write the poem. Gounod also says that Viardot recommended his opera to the director of the company, who at that time was Nestor Roqueplan. According to her daughter, Viardot made renewal of her contract for the 1850–1851 season at the Opéra conditional on a commission for Augier and Gounod. In any case, the contract between Augier, Gounod, and Roqueplan, which was dated 1 April 1850, specified a two-act opera to be provided by 30 September 1850 and performed no later than 1 April 1851.

== Composition history ==
Gounod, Augier, and Viardot were well suited for a collaboration. In reaction to some of the excesses of French romanticism, Augier (in addition to François Ponsard) had become one of the leaders of a movement in which a primary aim was the restoration of classical subjects to French drama. Viardot had a well-known interest in Greek literature, and Gounod himself, partly from his religious studies of biblical subjects, had become fascinated with the ancient world. The legends concerning the Greek poet Sappho were selected for the story of the opera, not least because this would provide a suitably serious and impressive title role for Viardot.

In his memoirs Gounod writes that on 2 April, shortly after Augier had completed the libretto, Gounod's architect brother Urbain became gravely ill. The following day Gounod signed the contract, and on 6 April Urbain died, leaving behind a two-year-old child and a widow who was two-months pregnant, a distraught mother, and several unfinished architectural projects. It was a month before Gounod could even begin to think about working on the opera. Pauline Viardot, who was in Germany performing, wrote and offered her house in Brie to Gounod as a tranquil retreat where he could focus on his composition as well as tend to the needs of his mother. Louis Viardot, Pauline's husband, had also offered money, presumably to help defray unanticipated expenses arising from Urbain's untimely demise.

Pauline Viardot also asked the Russian poet Ivan Turgenev, with whom she had an increasingly intimate relationship and who was on the verge of returning to Russia, to remain in France and join Gounod and his mother in Brie in order to provide additional support and comfort. A 16 May 1850 letter from Turgenev to Viardot provides an early glimpse of Gounod as composer:

What Gounod lacks somewhat is a brilliant and popular side. His music is like a temple: it is not open to all. I also believe that from his first appearance he will have enthusiastic admirers and great prestige as a musician with the general public; but fickle popularity, of the sort that stirs and leaps like a Bacchante, will never throw its arms around his neck. I even think that he will always hold it in disdain. His melancholy, so original in its simplicity and to which in the end one becomes so attached, does not have striking features that leave a mark upon the listener; he does not prick or arouse the listener—he does not titillate him. He possesses a wide range of colours on his palette but everything he writes—even a drinking song such as "Trinquons"—bears a lofty stamp. He idealizes everything he touches but in so doing he leaves the crowd behind. Yet among that mass of talented composers who are witty in a vulgar sort of way, intelligible not because of their clarity but because of their triviality, the appearance of a musical personality such as Gounod's is so rare that one cannot welcome him heartily enough. We spoke about these matters this morning. He knows himself as well as any man knows himself. I also do not think that he has much of a comic streak; Goethe once said "man ist am Ende … was man ist" ["one is in the end … what one is"].

By early September Gounod had nearly finished writing the music, when Pauline Viardot returned to France. She expressed herself as quite satisfied with the music he had written and within a few days had learned it well enough to accompany herself on the piano from memory, a musical feat which Gounod regarded as one of the most extraordinary he had ever witnessed. This did not mean, however, that she did not want alterations. Among several suggested changes, was the use of the melody of Gounod's earlier "Chanson du pêcheur" for Sapho's final soliloquy "Ô ma lyre immortelle". This was subsequently to become the most famous number from the opera. Gustave-Hippolyte Roger, who was originally intended to sing the lead tenor role of Phaon, also visited and found that his part was too insubstantial, so Augier was asked to make additions and more changes to his poem. Henry Chorley, another friend of the Viardots, also visited and may have made suggestions. In the end the opera had expanded to three acts and would occupy an entire evening.

Rehearsals at the Opéra began the first week of February 1851. Further changes were required by the censor. An exchange of a political document for sexual favors between Pythéas and Glycère caused a change in the line "prenez-moi pour amant" ("take me as a lover") to "traitez-moi tendrement" ("treat me tenderly"). Pythéas's verses "Oui, je comprends mignonne / Ton désir / Le mystère assaisonne / Le plaisir" ("Yes, I understand my sweet / Your desire / The secret spices up / The pleasure") became "Oui, j'aime ton caprice / De candeur / Le mystère est complice / Du bonheur" ("Yes, I like your whim / Of candor / The secret is an accessory / To happiness"). In the first act the character Alcée urges his fellow conspirators to slay the tyrant Pittacus. The censors' report of 12 April, four days before the premiere, suggested this passage could be an "inducement to popular agitation". The day before the premiere a new report stated: "Although the modifications diminish the danger we feared, they do not eliminate it completely."

The censors were concerned about the volatility of the political situation at the time. Louis Napoleon would declare himself Emperor of the French on 2 December 1851.

== Performance history ==
The opera finally opened on 16 April 1851. The sets were designed by Charles Séchan and Édouard Desplechin, and the mise-en-scène was by Leroy. Although there was some indulgence for a composer's first work, and many in the audience found much to like, the opera did not do well. The music was unusual for its time, and focused on the psychological drama between Sapho and Glycère. The diverse elements and historical subject matter of grand opera were missing, and some critics complained about the absence of a ballet. In some respects, it seemed a throwback to the style of Christoph Willibald Gluck rather than an advancement over Giacomo Meyerbeer. Beginning with the third performance a ballet with music by Édouard Deldevez was added after the opera, to send the audience away in a happier frame of mind, but it ended up making the evening far too long.

Hector Berlioz, writing in the Journal des débats (22 April 1851), besides praising the music, was very positive about the subject of Gounod's opera:

It seems I have the misfortune to be neither of my time nor of my country. For me, Sapho's unhappy love and that other obsessive love of Glycera's and Phaon's error, Alcaeus' unavailing enthusiasm, the dreams of liberty that culminate in exile, the Olympic festival and the worship of art by an entire people, the admirable final scene in which the dying Sapho returns for a moment to life and hears on one side the last distant farewell of Phaon to the Lesbian shore and on another the joyous song of a shepherd awaiting his young mistress, and the bleak wilderness, the deep sea, moaning for its prey, in which that immense love will find a worthy tomb, and then the beautiful Greek scenery, the fine costumes and elegant buildings, the noble ceremonies combining gravity and grace — all this, I confess, touches me to the heart, exalts the mind, excites and disturbs and enchants me more than I can say.

Unfortunately, also unlike Meyerbeer, the inexperienced Gounod had failed to ensure that the principal singers would be available for an extended run. Viardot had accepted other engagements for the latter part of May. Her sixth and last performance was on 12 May, when she was replaced by Elisabeth Masson. However, even when Viardot was appearing, receipts were only in the range of 4000 francs, about half of what they would have been for a performance of Le prophète or La Juive. Probably more significant were "structural weaknesses" in the opera itself. The pace was considered too slow and the declamatory sections too long.

Later productions were not much more successful. Sapho received a single performance at London's Covent Garden on 9 August 1851 in Italian (as Saffo) with Viardot as Sapho, Enrico Tamberlik as Phaon and Jeanne Castellan as Glycère; Michael Costa conducted. The press were hostile, with Viardot, Gounod and Augier heavily criticised. A Paris revival on 26 July 1858 at the Opéra, which compressed the work to two acts, was presented only ten times.

A later revision of the opera, presented by the Paris Opéra at the Palais Garnier from 2 April to 29 December 1884, expanded it to four acts, with Gabrielle Krauss in the title role, but had little more success. A new character, Pittacus, was introduced; the composer conducted the first three performances of the 29-performance run. The score of this version was never published, but Augier included the libretto in the first volume of his Théâtre complète.

The opera received its American professional premiere on 18 November 2018, at Lisner Auditorium in Washington, D.C. Washington Concert Opera presented the work, with Kate Lindsey in the title role.

== Roles ==
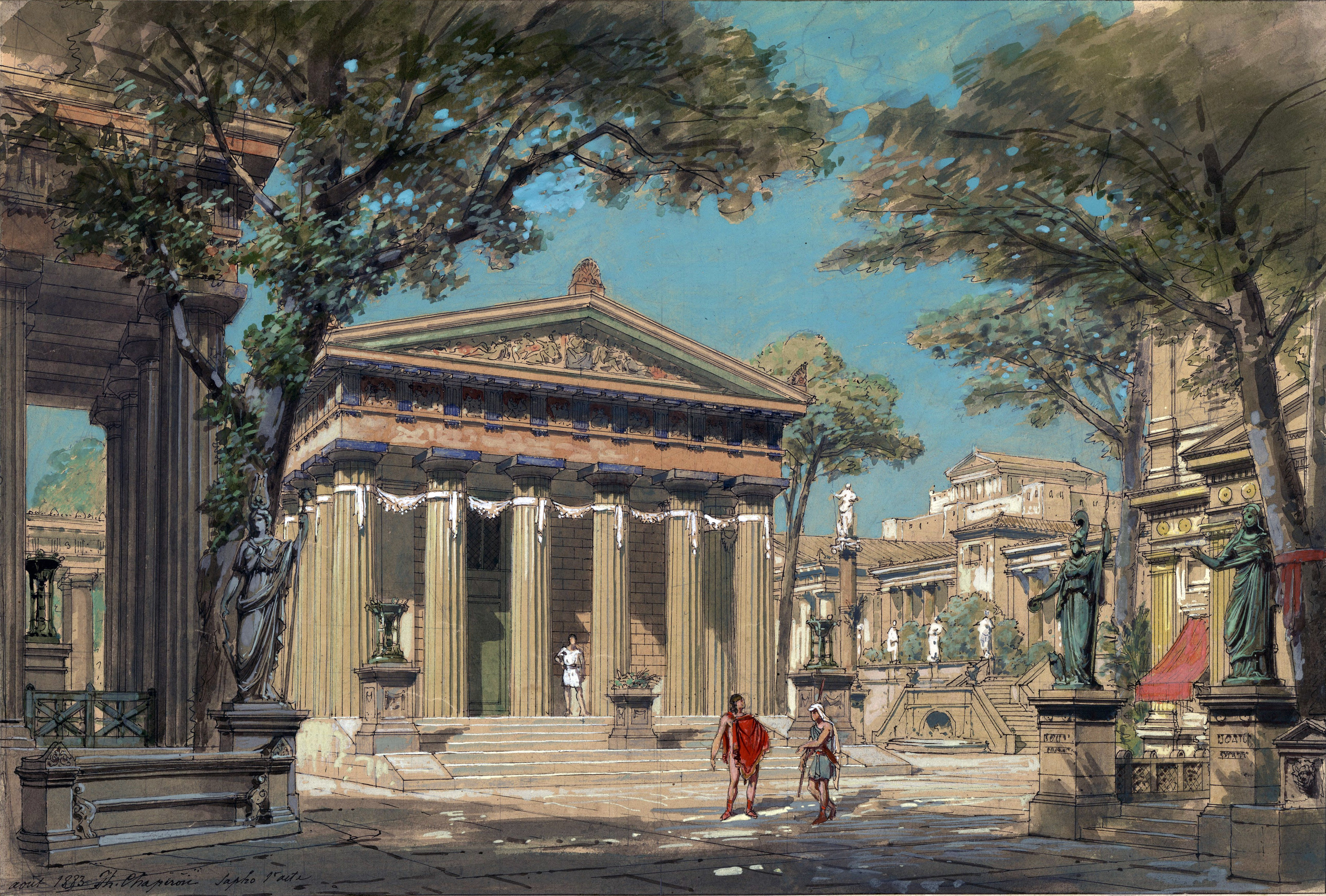
Design sketch by Philippe Chaperon for Act 1 in the 1884 production at the Palais Garnier

Role	Voice type	Premiere Cast, 16 April 1851 (Conductor: Narcisse Girard)	Revised version, 2 April 1884 (Conductor: Charles Gounod)
Sapho	mezzo-soprano	Pauline Viardot	Gabrielle Krauss
Glycère	soprano	Anne Poinsot	Alphonsine Richard
Œnone	mezzo-soprano		Dumesnil
Phaon	tenor	Louis Guéymard	Étienne Dereims
Pythéas	bass	Hippolyte Brémond	Pedro Gailhard
Alcée	baritone	Mécène Marié de l'Isle	Léon Melchissédec
Pittacus	bass	—	Pol Plançon
Cynégire	bass		Lambert
Cratès	tenor		Girard
Agathon	tenor		Sapin
High Priest	bass	Alexis Prévost	Palianti
A shepherd	tenor	Aimes	Piroia
People, young people, conspirators

== Synopsis ==
The story of the opera is based on the legends of the Greek poet Sappho, her love for Phaon and her suicide.

Place: Olympic Games and on the isle of Lesbos
Time: 6th century BC

=== Act 1 ===
The Olympic games

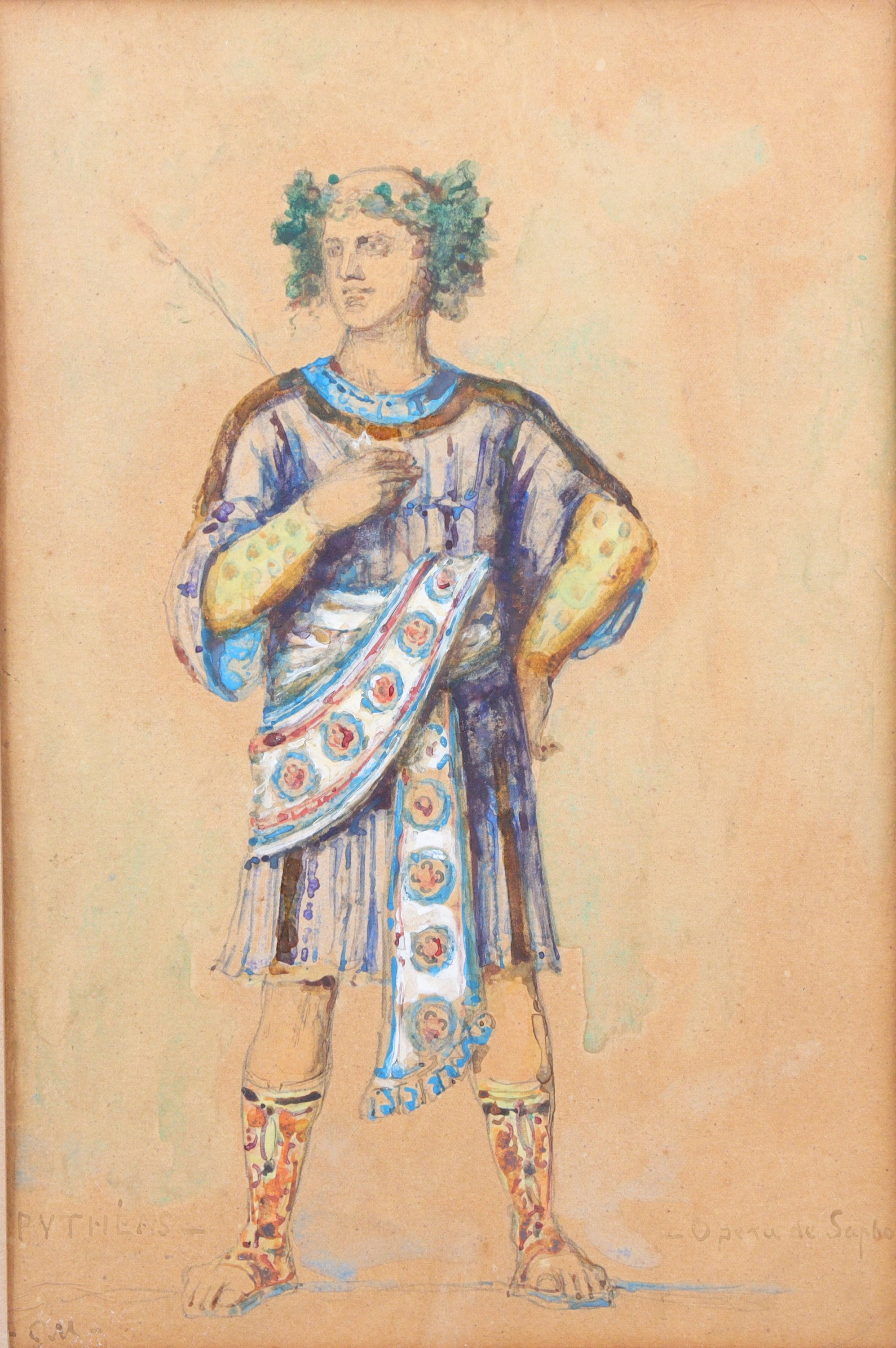
"Pytheas the drunkard," costume sketch by Gustave Moreau.

Phaon is torn in love between the poet Sapho and the courtesan Glycère, and is teased by Pythéas. Sapho wins the poetry competition from Alcée. Phaon declares his devotion to her.

=== Act 2 ===
Phaon's villa

Phaon is involved in a revolutionary plot to establish freedom and justice. Pythéas agrees to supply details of the plot to Glycère in return for her favours. Glycère secretly informs the authorities, but deceitfully tells Sapho she will not inform them if Phaon leaves Lesbos without Sapho. Phaon arranges to leave Lesbos, Sapho maintaining that she will not accompany him. Her inflexibility causes Phaon to turn to Glycère.

=== Act 3 ===
A windswept beach with the setting sun

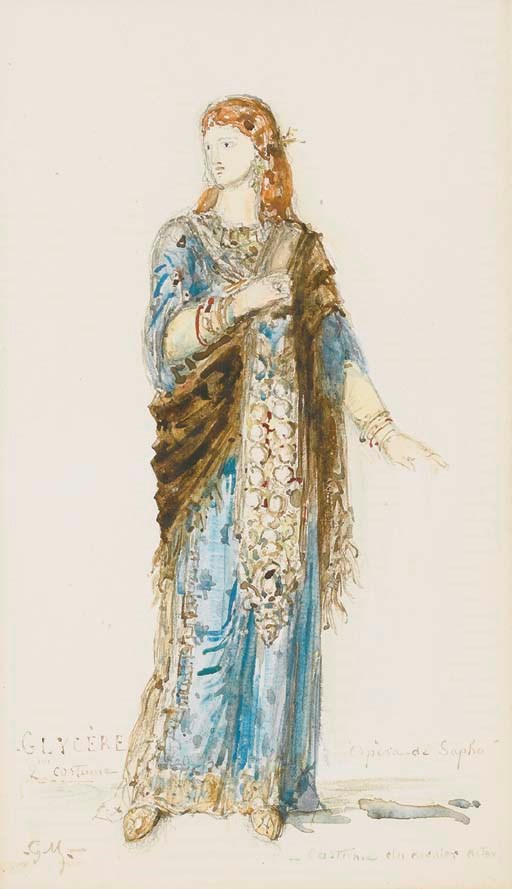
Glycère costume design for the final act, by Gustave Moreau

Phaon, Glycère and the conspirators bid farewell to their country. Sapho has come to bid them farewell but Phaon curses her. Nonetheless she forgives and blesses Phaon, and then commits suicide by leaping into the ocean.

== Recordings ==
Ô ma lyre immortelle
Ernestine Schumann-Heink (1909)

- Katherine Ciesinski, mezzo-soprano (Sapho); Éliane Lublin, soprano (Glycère); Alain Vanzo, tenor (Phaon); Frédéric Vassar, bass-baritone (Pythéas); Alain Meunier, baritone (Alcée); French Radio Chorus and New Philharmonic Orchestra; Sylvain Cambreling, conducting. Harmonia Mundi 2453/4 (3 LPs); 32453/4 (2 CDs). Text included. Recorded at a public performance in La Maison de la Radio Paris on 5 January 1979.
- Michèle Command, soprano (Sapho); Sharon Coste, soprano (Glycère); Christian Papis, tenor (Phaon); Eric Faury, tenor (Alcée); Lionel Sarrazin, bass-baritone (Pythéas); Saint-Étienne Lyric Chorus and Nouvel Orchestra; Patrick Fournillier, conducting. Koch-Schwann CD 3-1311-2 (2 CDs). Notes, text, and translation included. Recorded live in March 1992 at the Grand Théâtre de la Maison de la Culture et de la Communication in Saint-Étienne.

The final number "Ô ma lyre immortelle" has been recorded by many great singers beginning with Félia Litvinne and Ernestine Schumann-Heink down to Grace Bumbry, Shirley Verrett, and Marilyn Horne among others.
