= Roland à Roncevaux =

Roland à Roncevaux may refer to:

- Roland à Roncevaux, song by Rouget de Lisle
- Roland à Roncevaux, opera by Auguste Mermet
- Roland à Roncevaux, film by Louis Feuillade 1910
