= Woman Reading (Manet) =

Oil painting by Édouard Manet

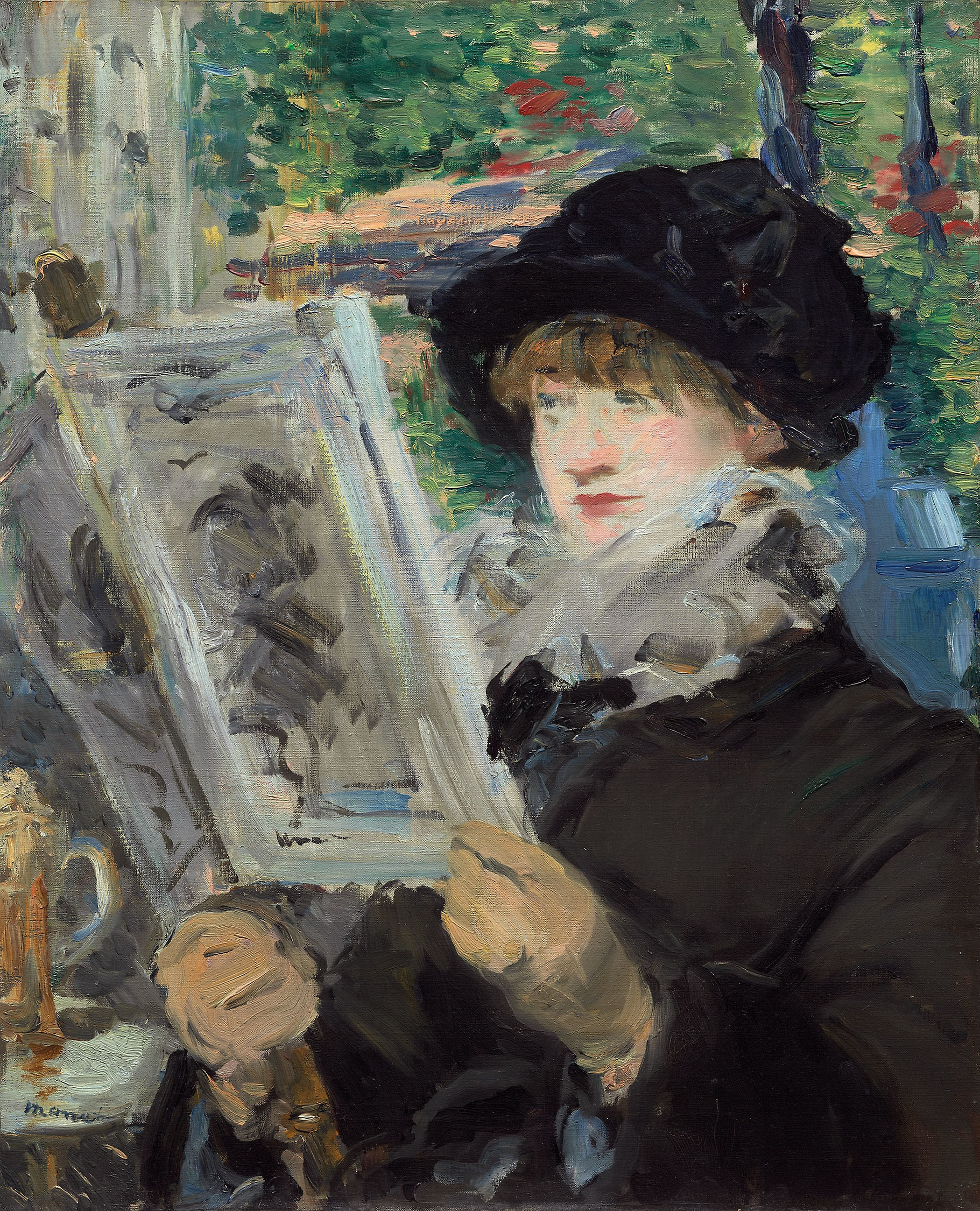
- Artist: Édouard Manet
- Year: c.1880–1882
- Movement: Impressionism
- Dimensions: 61.2 cm × 50.7 cm (24.1 in × 20.0 in)
- Location: Art Institute of Chicago

Woman Reading is an oil on canvas painting created by Édouard Manet. It was painted between 1880 and 1882. As of 2025 it is on display at the Art Institute of Chicago, its dimensions are 61.2 × 50.7 cm and framed, 83.2 × 73.1 × 9.9 cm. The title commonly used for the painting is how Manet referred to the work in his account book, the artwork has previously been known as Le journal illustré (The illustrated newspaper).

== Content ==
Set at a café in Paris, Woman Reading features a woman in a coat, hat, and gloves reading a paper. The open paper and the fichu collar were laid in using a thin gray wash, barely articulated with overlying dashes of black and white paint, and the model's face consists primarily of exposed off-white ground. There are faint charcoal marks just visible under her features. Manet's name is signed on the lower left of the table in dark blue.

== Interpretation ==
Formally, the painting is a classic Impressionist work. The colors are vibrant and detail is only applied to the face. Manet's brushstrokes are brief and quick, capturing an ephemeral moment in time. However, this is a ruse, the composition is more constructed than initial impressions. Although the painting has the look of a plein air work, the background is one of Manet's own paintings The Watering Can (1880), repurposed. Evidence of the fact is visible in the blue behind the woman's head, originally a watering can. The marble table and mug of beer were added afterwards to create the illusion of a Parisian café or terrace. Another hint as to the spatial disconnection between the model and her surroundings is the leafy greens present in the background, and her high winter collar and coat.

In the 1800s in Paris, paintings of women that are shown smoking, or drinking (especially beer not decanted), was a coded way of referring to prostitution through "unladylike" behavior. Although the woman in the painting has a rosy-cheeked innocence and wears gloves, one interpretation is that she's a prostitute, scanning the room over her reading for potential customers. However, some interpretations suggest she is merely engrossed in her reading. Given that the magazine she is reading is illustrated, it is possible that it is a fashion magazine. The questions the painting raises are classic ones surrounding the social-chameleon prostitute that Manet liked to portray. Is, given her gloves and book, the woman a lady? Or, given the potential illiteracy, performance, or frivolity with her reading, and her mug of beer, is she soliciting sex? One suggestion is that this work is an open-ended narrative, intended to provide more questions than answers.

== History ==
The painting was sold by the artist to Jean-Baptiste Faure in 1882. It stayed in the Faure family until around 1928. Soon afterwards the painting came to the United States, and was sold by the Howard Young Galleries to Lewis Coburn in 1929, under the painting's previous title of Le journal illustré. The sum paid was not disclosed but The New York Times suggested it could have been into six figures. Mrs. Coburn then bequeathed the work to the Art Institute of Chicago in 1933. The painting has been exhibited more widely, before and after the Institute acquired the artwork:

- Paris, Ecole Nationale des Beaux-Arts, Exposition des Oeuvres de Édouard Manet, January 1884, cat. 92.
- Pittsburgh, Carnegie Institute, Exhibition of Paintings: Édouard Manet, Pierre Renoir, Berthe Morisot, October–December 1924, cat. 37 (ill.).
- Paris, Bernheim-Jeune, Exposition des Oeuvre de Manet, 1925, cat. 78.
- Paris, Bernheim-Jeune, Exposition des Oeuvre de Manet, April–May 1928, cat. 25 (ill.).
- Berlin, Goldschmidt Galerie, Impressionisten Sondersusstellung, 1928.
- The Art Institute of Chicago, Mrs. L. L. Coburn Collection, 1932, cat. 17 (ill.).
- The Art Institute of Chicago, Century of Progress Exhibition of Paintings and Sculpture, June 1–November 1, 1933, cat. 328.
- The Art Institute of Chicago, Century of Progress Exhibition of Paintings and Sculpture, June 1–November 1, 1934, cat. 249.
- New York, Wildenstein & Co., Edouard Manet: A Retrospective Loan Exhibition for the Benefit of French Hospitals, March–April 1937, cat. 29 (ill.).
- San Francisco, Palace of Fine Arts, Golden Gate International Exposition 1940, cat. 276 (ill.).
- New York, Metropolitan Museum of Art, French Painting From David Toulouse-Lautrec, February–March 1941, cat. 81.
- Des Moines, Iowa, Art Center, 19th and 20th Century European and American Art, 1948, no cat.
- Birmingham, Alabama, Museum of Art, Catalogue of the Opening Exhibition, April 8–June 3, 1951, p. 29.
- The Philadelphia Museum of Art, Manet, November 3–December 11, 1966, cat. 161 (ill.); traveled to The Art Institute of Chicago, February 13–19, 1967.
- The Art Institute of Chicago, Art at the Time of the Centennial, June 19–August 8, 1976, extended to August 15, 1976, no cat.
- Albi, Musée Toulouse-Lautrec, Trésors Impressionnistes du Musée de Chicago, June 27–August 31, 1980, cat. 4 (ill.).
- Washington D.C., National Gallery of Art, Manet and Modern Paris, December 5, 1982–March 6, 1983, cat. 22 (ill.).
- Paris, Galeries nationales du Grand Palais, Manet: 1832–1883, April 22–August 1, 1983, cat. 174 (ill.); traveled to New York, Metropolitan Museum of Art, September 10–November 27, 1983.
- Tokyo, Seibu, Museum of Art, The Impressionist Tradition: Masterpieces from The Art Institute of Chicago, October 18–December 17, 1985, cat. 34 (ill.); traveled to Fukuoka, Art Museum, January 5–February 2, 1986; and Kyoto, Municipal Museum of Art, March 4–April 13, 1986.
- Tokyo, ASAHI, Masterworks of Modern Art From The Art Institute of Chicago, 1994, cat. 9 (ill.); traveled to Nagaoka, Niiagata Prefectural Museum of Modern Art; Nagoya, Aichi Prefectural Museum of Art; and Yokohama Museum of Art, 1994-1995.
- London, National Gallery, Impressions: Painting Quickly in France, 1860-1890, November 1, 2000-January 28, 2001, no cat. no. (ill.);
- Amsterdam, Van Gogh Museum, March 2-May 20, 2001;
- Williamstown, Mass., Sterling and Francine Clark Art Institute, June 16-September 9, 2001.
- Fort Worth, Tex., Kimbell Museum of Art, The Impressionists: Master Paintings from the Art Institute of Chicago, June 29–November 2, 2008, cat. 21 (ill.).
- The Art Institute of Chicago, Manet and Modern Beauty, May 26 - September 8, 2019, cat no. 56; The J. Paul Getty Museum, October 8, 2019–January 12, 2020.
- Fine Arts Museums of San Francisco, Legion of Honor, Manet & Morisot, Oct. 11, 2025-Feb. 15, 2026;
- Cleveland Museum of Art, Mar. 29–July 5, 2026 (Cleveland only).

This painting as of 2025 is on display at the Art Institute of Chicago, 111 Michigan Ave in Chicago, Illinois. The painting is in the "Painting and Sculpture of Europe" Gallery 201.
