= Die Kinder der Heide =

Opera by Anton Rubinstein

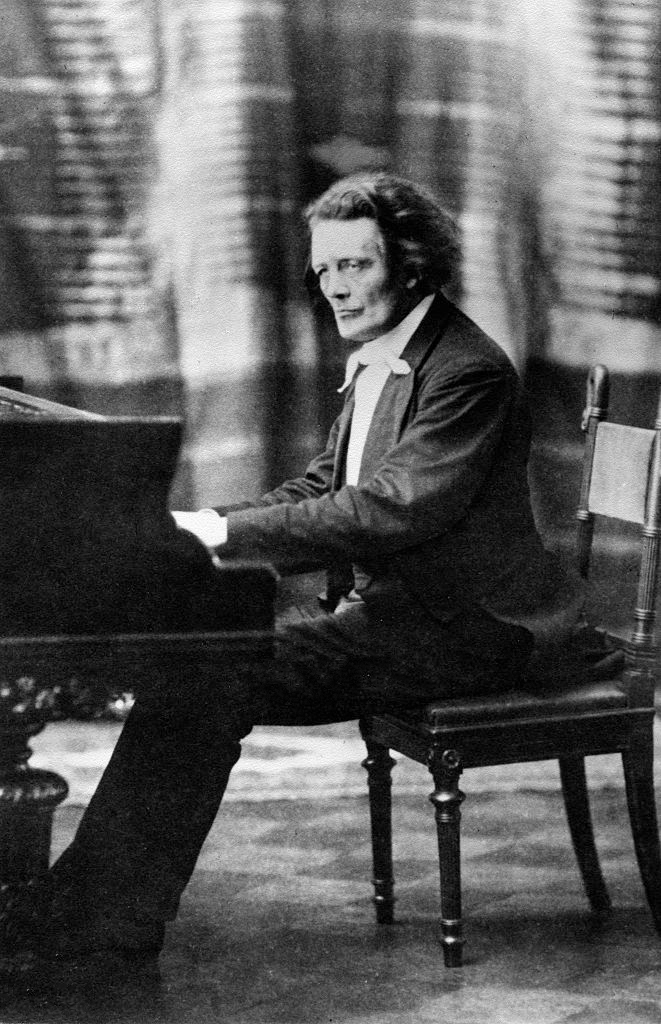
Rubinstein at the piano

Die Kinder der Heide (The Children of the Moorland) is a four-act opera by Anton Rubinstein, to a libretto by Salomon Mosenthal, based on a verse novel by the Hungarian poet Carl Beck.

== Background ==
Whilst working on the opera in 1859, Rubinstein wrote to a friend:

I have absolutely no luck with opera texts. I have wasted a lot of time and money and everything has been unusable.[...] I am hoping that with my present attempt, I shall have more luck, and then the world will have something novel in store!

He also told Franz Liszt that he hoped to have the opera premiered in Vienna, where in fact it was eventually produced in 1861 - most of the opera was written in Dornbach, not far from the capital. The opera's first performance in Russia was in 1867.

== Roles ==
Role	Voice type	Premiere Cast, 23 February 1861, Kärntnertor Theatre, Vienna
Count Waldemar	tenor	Gustav Walter
Conrad, an innkeeper	baritone	Hrabanek
Maria, his daughter	soprano	Gabrielle Krauss
Wania, a herdsman	tenor	Aloys Ander
Isbrana, a gypsy	mezzo-soprano	Csillag
Gypsies, villagers, soldiers, etc

== Synopsis ==
The location is a Hungarian village.

=== Act 1 ===
Wania is Isbrania's lover; she tells him of a planned robbery of Conrad's inn, which Wania foils. Conrad offers him as a reward his daughter Maria in marriage.

=== Act 2 ===
Maria confesses to her father that she is in love with a mystery man, who turns out to be Count Waldemar. Waldemar and Isbrana conspire to interrupt the marriage ceremony.

=== Act 3 ===
Finding Maria with the Count, Wania fights and kills him. He is helped to escape by Isbrana and the gypsies.

=== Act 4 ===
In a forest hideout, Wania is visited by the grieving Conrad and Maria, who has gone mad. Wania prevents the gypsies from robbing them as they depart. Soldiers arrive to arrest Wania; when he refuses to escape with Isbrania she stabs herself and dies.

== Sources ==
- Philip S. Taylor, Anton Rubinstein: A life in music, Indianapolis, 2007
