= Clementine Krauss =

Austrian dancer, opera singer, and actress

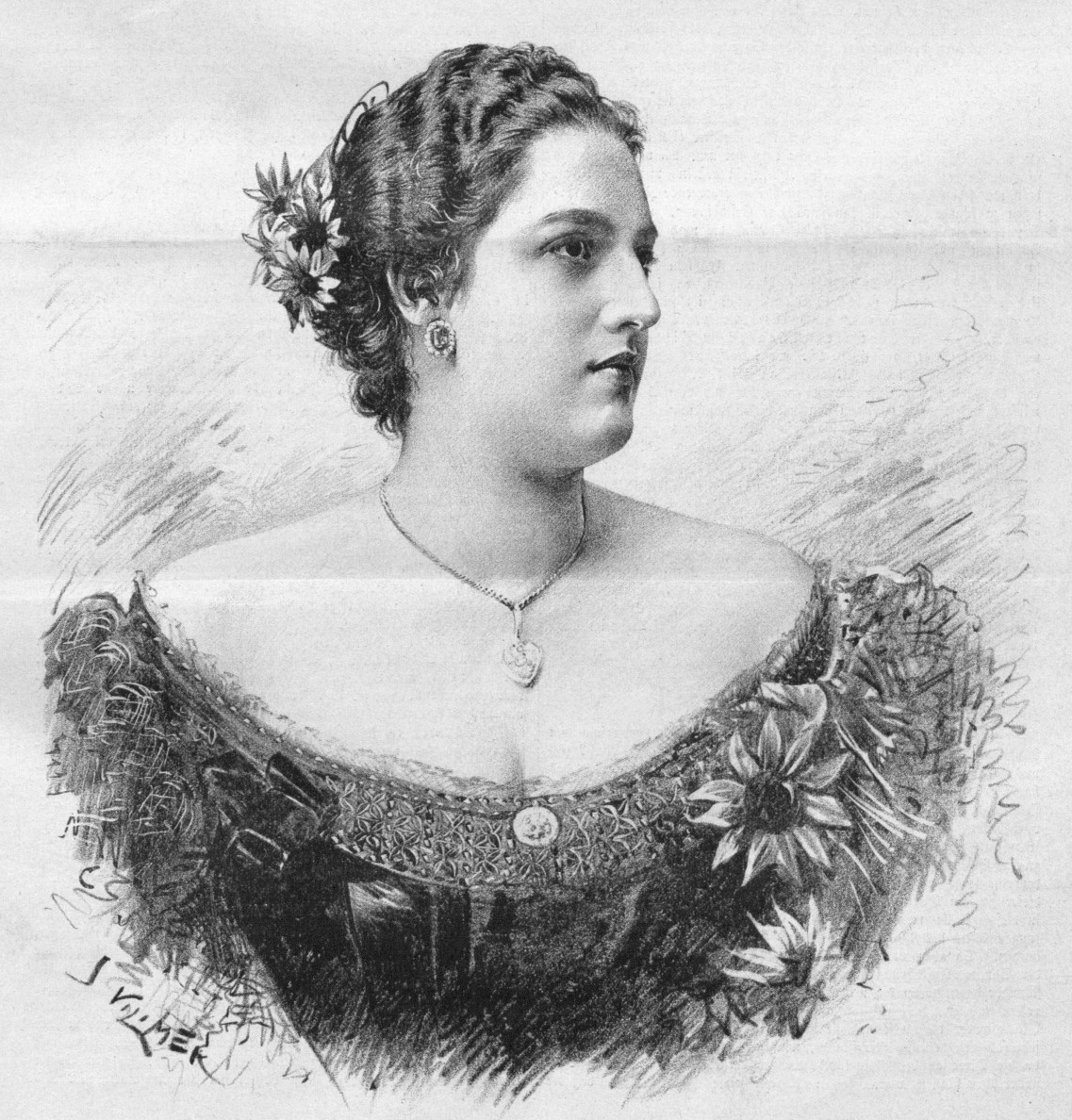
- Born: 25 April 1877; Vienna, Austria-Hungary
- Died: 18 April 1938 (aged 60); Prague, Czechoslovakia
- Other name: Clementine Chmel
- Education: Vienna Imperial Opera Ballet School
- Occupations: actress, dancer, opera singer, theatre director
- Spouse: Ottokar Chmel (m. 1914)
- Partners: Henry Baltazzi
- Children: Clemens Krauss
- Relatives: Gabrielle Krauss (aunt)
- Career
- Former groups: Vienna Imperial Opera Ballet

Clementine Krauss, later Clementine Chmel (25 April 1877 – 18 April 1938) was an Austrian ballerina, actress, opera singer and director. She was a dancer with the Vienna Imperial Opera Ballet until she gave birth to her son, Clemens Krauss, at the age of fifteen. Her career then shifted to the theatre, where she performed as a stage actress. After studying music, she became an opera singer and a director at the Vienna Volksoper.

== Family and early life ==
Krauss was born in Vienna on 25 April 1877 to Maximilian Krauss and Elisabeth Weber. She was from an artistic family; her sister Helene Krauss was a dancer and mimic at the Vienna Imperial Opera and her aunt was the operatic soprano Gabrielle Krauss.

At the age of six, Krauss was sent to study ballet at the Vienna Court Opera's dance school.

== Career ==
In 1888, aged eleven, Krauss joined the Vienna Imperial Opera Ballet as an apprentice. From 1890 to 1892, she was a member of the corps de ballet, and eventually she was promoted to the role of principal ballerina. Her dance career ended after she gave birth to a child, and she became a stage actress. She took speech training with Bernhard Baumeister and became performing on tour in 1894.

In 1894 and 1895, she was engaged at the Lessing Theater in Berlin. She studied singing under Rosa Papier and became a celebrated guest on performance tours in Graz, Cologne, Essen, Hermannstadt, and Olomouc. From 1908 to 1913, she worked at the Vienna Volksoper as an operetta singer, stage actress, and stage director.

== Personal life ==
When Krauss was fifteen, and working as a dancer at the Imperial Ballet, she had an affair with Chevalier Hector Baltazzi, a member of a wealthy Greek-Austrian banking family and the brother of Baroness Helene von Vetsera. She had a son from their relationship, the conductor and general manager Clemens Krauss.

She married the opera singer Ottokar Chmel in 1914. After her wedding, she and her husband settled in Prague, where she taught singing lessons.

She died on 18 April 1938 in Prague, at the age of 60.
