= Ascanio =

Opera by Camille Saint-Saëns

- grand opera by Camille Saint-Saëns
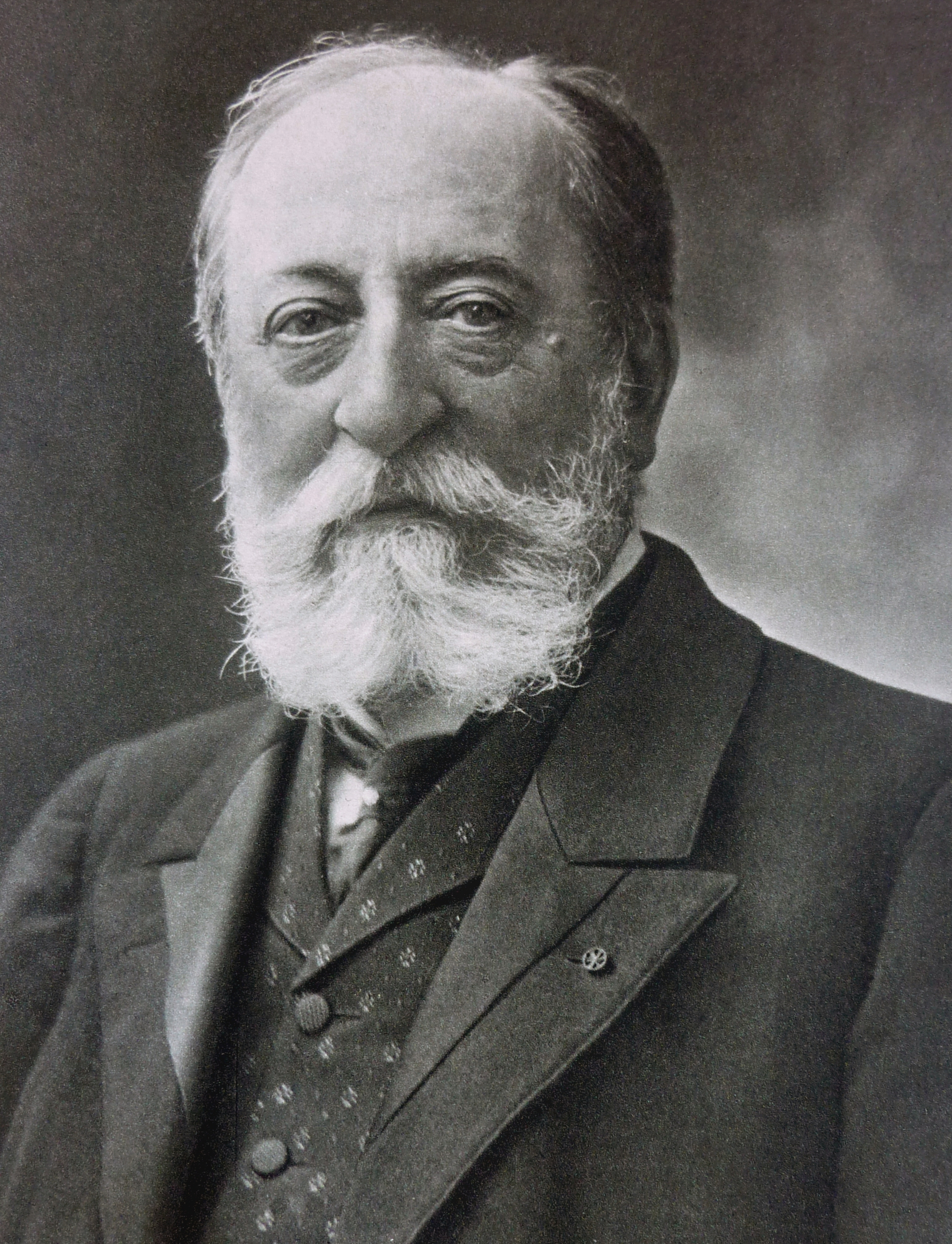
- The composer in 1895
- Librettist: Louis Gallet
- Language: French
- Based on: Benvenuto Cellini by Paul Meurice
- Premiere: 21 March 1890; Académie Nationale de Musique, Paris

Ascanio is a grand opera in five acts and seven tableaux by composer Camille Saint-Saëns. The opera's French libretto, by Louis Gallet, is based on the 1852 play Benvenuto Cellini by French playwright Paul Meurice which was in turn based on the 1843 historical novel by Alexandre Dumas, père. The name was changed to Ascanio to avoid confusion with the Berlioz opera Benvenuto Cellini. The opera premiered on March 21, 1890, at the Académie Nationale de Musique in Paris, in costumes designed by Charles Bianchini and sets by Jean-Baptiste Lavastre and Eugène Carpezat (acts I; II, scene 2; and III), Auguste Alfred Rubé and Philippe Chaperon and Marcel Jambon (act II, scene 1).

== Composition history ==
Ascanio was composed by Saint-Saëns during 1887–1888. Saint-Saëns chose the subject of the historical figure of Benvenuto Cellini largely due to his friendship with Meurice who, in addition to writing the play about Cellini, also helped Dumas write the 1843 novel. The subject also appealed to Saint-Saëns' long-term desire to base his operas in French history. The opera's libretto largely follows Meurice's play, although it does not include a scene where Cellini runs out of metal while casting a statue. The only notable departure from the play is the third act which is set at a fête at Fontainebleau. The music for this act includes a lengthy divertissement of 12 dances which is highly reminiscent of French Baroque opera. Saint-Saëns dedicated the finished opera to Pauline Viardot, the French mezzo-soprano and composer.

The opera premiered at the Palais Garnier in Paris in 1890 to a poor reception. George Bernard Shaw, after attending the premiere, remarked "I need not waste my words on the music of it. There is not an original phrase in it from beginning to end." The work did not see a revival until 1921, the year of Saint-Saëns' death; however, a section of the ballet music is a popular excerpt for flute players.

== Synopsis ==
Place: Paris
Time: 1539

This opera concerns the historical figure of 16th-century Italian sculptor Benvenuto Cellini during the time he spent at the court of François I in Fontainebleau and Paris.

Cellini and apprentice Ascanio are both madly in love with Colombe, daughter of the Provost of Paris. This arouses the jealousies of two women: Scozzone, who herself is in love with Cellini, and the Duchess who is an admirer of Ascanio. Cellini steps aside to let Ascanio pursue Colombe, but when he realises that the jealousy of the two spurned women may prove dangerous to the girl, he hides her in a reliquary he has designed for a local convent, and plans on having her taken there for safety. However, the Duchess uncovers this plan and has the reliquary diverted to her own estate, planning on letting the girl suffocate in it. However, Scozzone secretly took the place of Colombe when she regretted having been originally a part of the Duchess's plot.

Meanwhile, Cellini has asked the King to allow the wedding of Ascanio and Colombe as a reward for his latest artistic masterpiece. The King has agreed. This happy news, however, is overshadowed by the sad discovery that Scozzone has suffocated and died in Colombe's place.

== Roles ==
Role	Voice type	Premiere cast, 21 March 1890
Benvenuto Cellini	baritone	Jean Lassalle
Ascanio	tenor	Émile Cossira
François I	bass	Pol Plançon
Charles V	bass	Eugène Bataille
Duchesse d'Étampes	soprano	Ada Adini
Scozzone	contralto	Rosa Bosman
D'Estourville	tenor	Gallois
Colombe d'Estourville	soprano	Emma Eames
D'Orbec	tenor	Tequi
Pagolo	bass	Crépeaux
A beggar	baritone	Jean Martapoura
Ursuline	soprano	Nastorg
Lady Périne	mute	

== Recordings ==
- Saint-Saëns: Ascanio - La Chanson de Scozzone, aria on recital by Régine Crespin with Alain Lombard & L'Orchestre de la Suisse Romande
- Saint-Saëns: Ascanio - (complete) Jean-Francois Lapointe, Bernard Richter, Eve-Maud Hubeaux, Jean Teitgen, Karina Gauvin, Clemence Tilquin. Chœur et Orchestre de la Haute École de Musique de Genève, Chœur du Grand Théâtre de Genève. Guillaume Tourniaire. B Records 2018
