= Le tribut de Zamora =

1881 opera by Charles Gounod and Adolphe d'Ennery

- Grand opera by Charles Gounod
- Poster for the first production
- Librettist: Adolphe d'Ennery
- Language: French
- Premiere: 1 April 1881; Palais Garnier, Paris

Le tribut de Zamora is a grand opera in four acts by Charles Gounod, to a libretto by Adolphe d'Ennery and Jules Brésil set in Moorish Spain shortly after the Battle of Zamora in 939 CE. The work was premiered at the Paris Opera's Palais Garnier on 1 April 1881.

It was Gounod's last work for the stage. The libretto was offered to Gounod after negotiations with Giuseppe Verdi stalled. The premiere was a success, Hermosa's patriotic "Debout! enfants de l'Ibérie!" (sung by Gabrielle Krauss) being enthusiastically encored, and praise being showered on the magnificent costumes by Eugène Lacoste and the four settings designed by Auguste Alfred Rubé and Philippe Chaperon (acts 1 and 4), Jean-Baptiste Lavastre (act 2), Antoine Lavastre and Eugène Carpezat (act 3). The piece ran for 34 performances.

Twentieth century criticism is less kind, calling it "musty...too reminiscent of his earlier work" or dismissing it as an exercise in spagnuolismo (Hispanicism).

== Roles ==
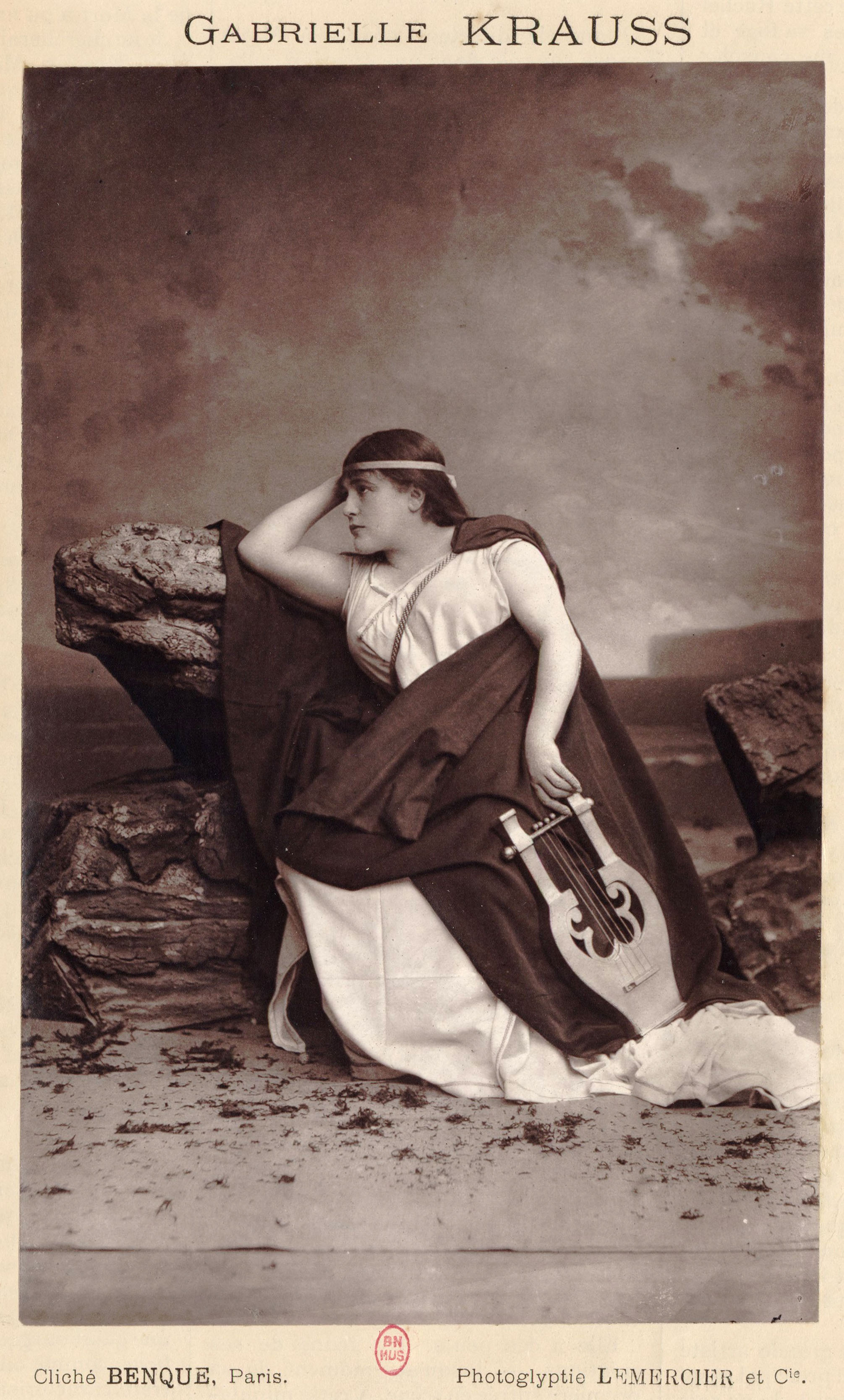
Gabrielle Krauss, who created the role of Hermosa

Roles, voice type, premiere cast
Role	Voice type	Premiere cast
Xaïma	soprano	Joséphine Daram
Hermosa, a madwoman	soprano	Gabrielle Krauss
Iglésia, Xaïma's friend	soprano	Élisabeth Janvier
Manoël, Xaïma's fiancé	ténor	Henri Sellier
Ben-Saïd, envoy of the caliph of Cordoba	baryton	Jean Lassalle
Hadjar, his brother	basse	Léon Melchissédec
Le roi, king of tenth-century Asturias	basse	Alfred Giraudet

== Synopsis ==
Scene: Moorish Spain shortly after the Moors defeated the Spanish forces under Ramiro II of León in the Battle of Zamora in 939 CE.

=== Act 1 ===
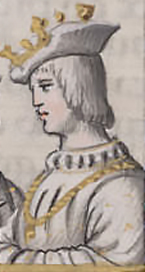
Ramiro II of Leon

A public square in Oviedo. In the background the Spanish royal palace.

Manoël, a young Spanish soldier, greets his bride Xaïma on their wedding day. The festivities are interrupted by Ben-Saïd, envoy of the caliph of Cordoba, riding up accompanied by his entourage.

Since the Moors defeated the Spaniards at the Battle of Zamora they claim a tribute of one hundred virgins each year. Only Oviedo, as a royal seat, has so far been spared. Now Ben-Saïd has come to demand of King Ramiro II that Oviedo supply twenty virgins as its quota. Xaïma appears in her wedding gown. She mourns the outcome of the battle of Zamora, in which she lost her family.

Ben-Saïd is enthralled by Xaïma's temperament and beauty and decides he will keep her for himself and promises to treat her royally. Manoël presents himself as Xaïma's bridegroom; Ben-Saïd decides to prevent the wedding. He goes into the royal palace, Xaïma and the angry Manoël stay behind. Xaïma vows to him that nothing can change her love.

The people gather to celebrate the wedding. The king appears, and it is announced that Oviedo will contribute its share of the tribute; twenty virgins will be handed over to the Moors that day. Manoël attempts to arouse the Spaniards to rebellion but the King implores them to accept the sacrifice to prevent further bloodshed.

The girls to be delivered to the Moors are chosen by lot, which falls on Xaïma and her friend Iglésia. Xaïma and Manoël are desperate. He curses Ben-Saïd, who continues to desire Xaïma. The Spanish people promise Manoël help. Together they sing their national anthem.

=== Act 2 ===
A bazaar on the shore of the Guadalquivir near Córdoba

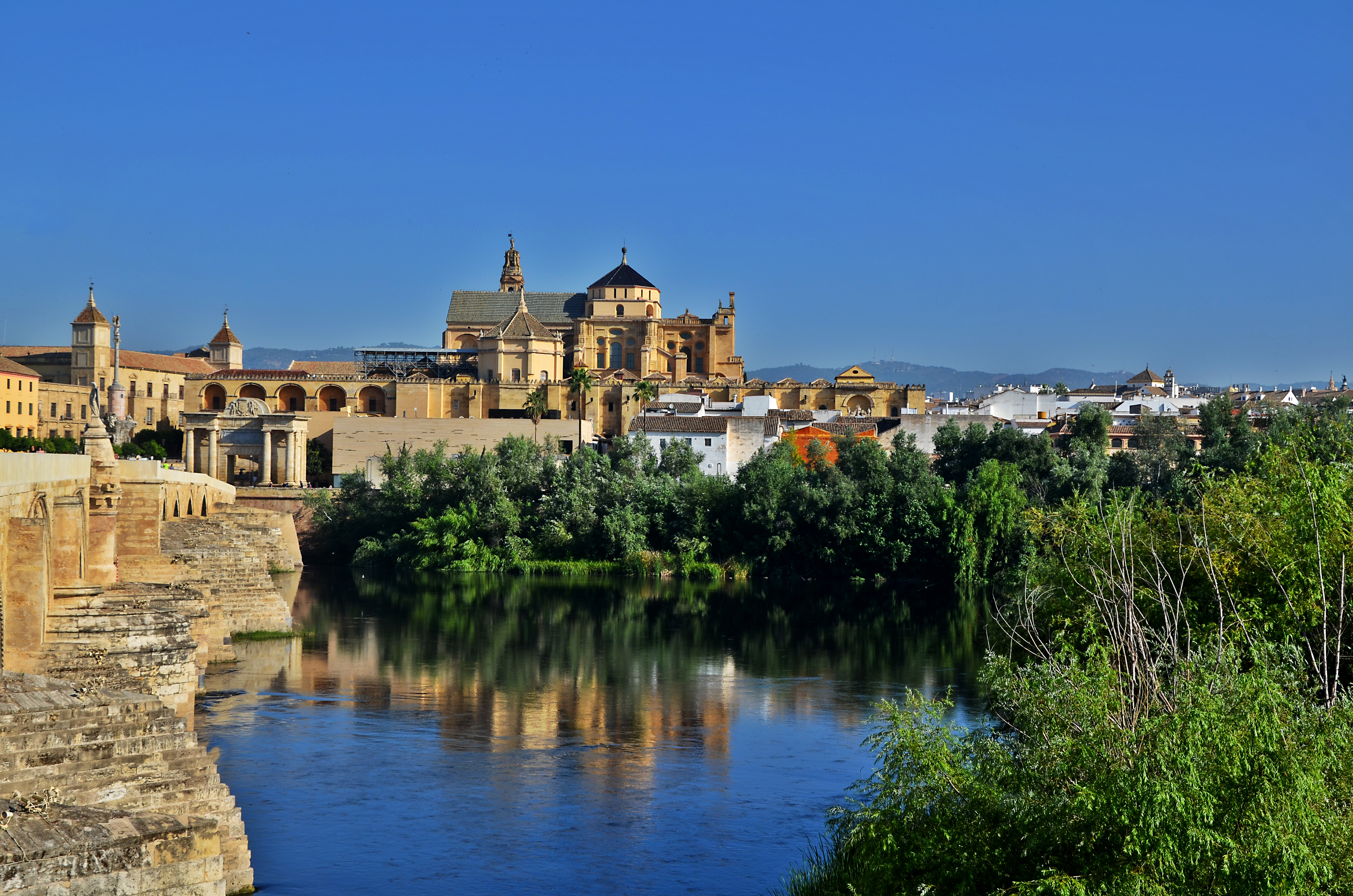
Córdoba Mosque–Cathedral across the Guadalquivir river

The Moorish soldiers celebrate their victory over the Spanish in the battle of Zamora. Hermosa, a madwoman who was captured in that battle, appears and asks them to cease glorying in their triumph over her people. The soldiers mock her but she is protected by Hadjar, brother of Ben-Saïd, who took her as booty. Hadjar quotes a verse from the Koran to prevent the Moors harming Hermosa – "Consider as saints the madmen, otherwise be cursed". Hermosa has a vision of herself united in heaven with her children.

The virgins arrive to be auctioned off and Manoël, who has disguised himself as a Berber in order to follow Xaïma, also arrives on the scene. Hadjar recognises him as the man who once saved his life in battle and offers his help when he learns that Manoël is in love with Xaïma.

In the auction Ben-Saïd bids a huge sum of money for Xaïma and thereby wins her, to Manoël's despair.

=== Act 3 ===
In the palace of Ben-Saïd

Ben-Saïd attempts to win the love of Xaïma but she rejects him and leaves. Hadjar enters with Manoël whom he presents to his brother as the man who saved his life and asks that he be given the freedom of the empire. When Ben-Saïd refuses, Manoël denounces him and tries to attack him but is disarmed. Manoël is about to be put to death when Xaïma returns and appeals to Ben-Saïd for mercy. Ben-Saïd agrees to spare his life if Manoël will leave the territory immediately.

Xaïma, alone, is in despair, when she is met by Hermosa. When Hermosa learns that Xaïma comes from Zamora, she slowly regains her wits and has a vision of how her husband was burnt alive during that battle. She sings the national anthem in remembrance (Air: "Debout! enfants de l'Ibérie!"). Hermosa recognises Xaïma as her daughter and the two joyfully celebrate their reunion.

=== Act 4 ===
The gardens of Ben-Saïd's palace

Manoël has climbed over the walls into the garden to see Xaïma one last time. She joins him and they decide to die together. Manoël takes his dagger, about to stab her through the heart and then kill himself, when Hermosa appears and snatches the weapon from him. Ben-Saïd enters whereupon Manoël and Hermosa leave. Ben-Saïd once more implores Xaïma to accept his love and she again refuses. He orders her to join him in the palace, but on the steps Hermosa once again intervenes and begs him to spare her daughter. When he shows no intention of doing so, Hermosa takes the dagger she seized from Manoël and stabs Ben-Saïd through the heart. Hadjar comes onto the scene and pardons Hermosa on the grounds of insanity.

== Revival ==
The opera was given a concert performance by the Münchner Rundfunkorchester and the Chor des Bayerischen Rundfunks on 28 January 2018.

== Recording ==
- 2018: Judith van Wanroij (Xaima), Jennifer Holloway (Hermosa), Edgaras Montvidas (Manoel), Tassis Christoyannis (Ben-Said), Boris Pinkhasovich (Handjar), Juliette Mars (Iglésia), Münchner Rundfunkorchester, Chor des Bayerischen Rundfunks, Hervé Niquet, conductor; CD Bru Zane Cat: BZ1033
