= Jean-Baptiste Faure =

French opera singer

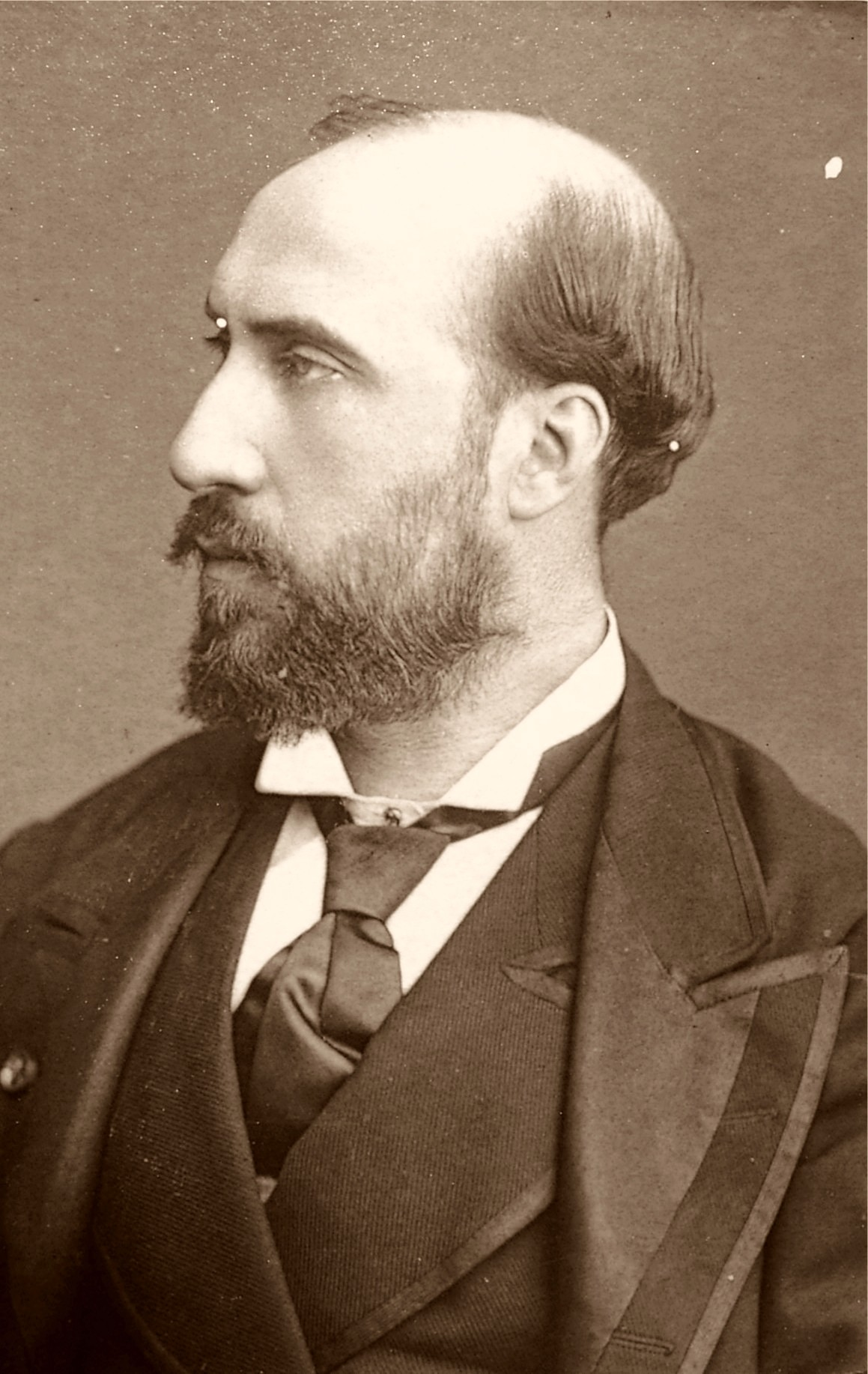
Jean-Baptiste Faure in 1850

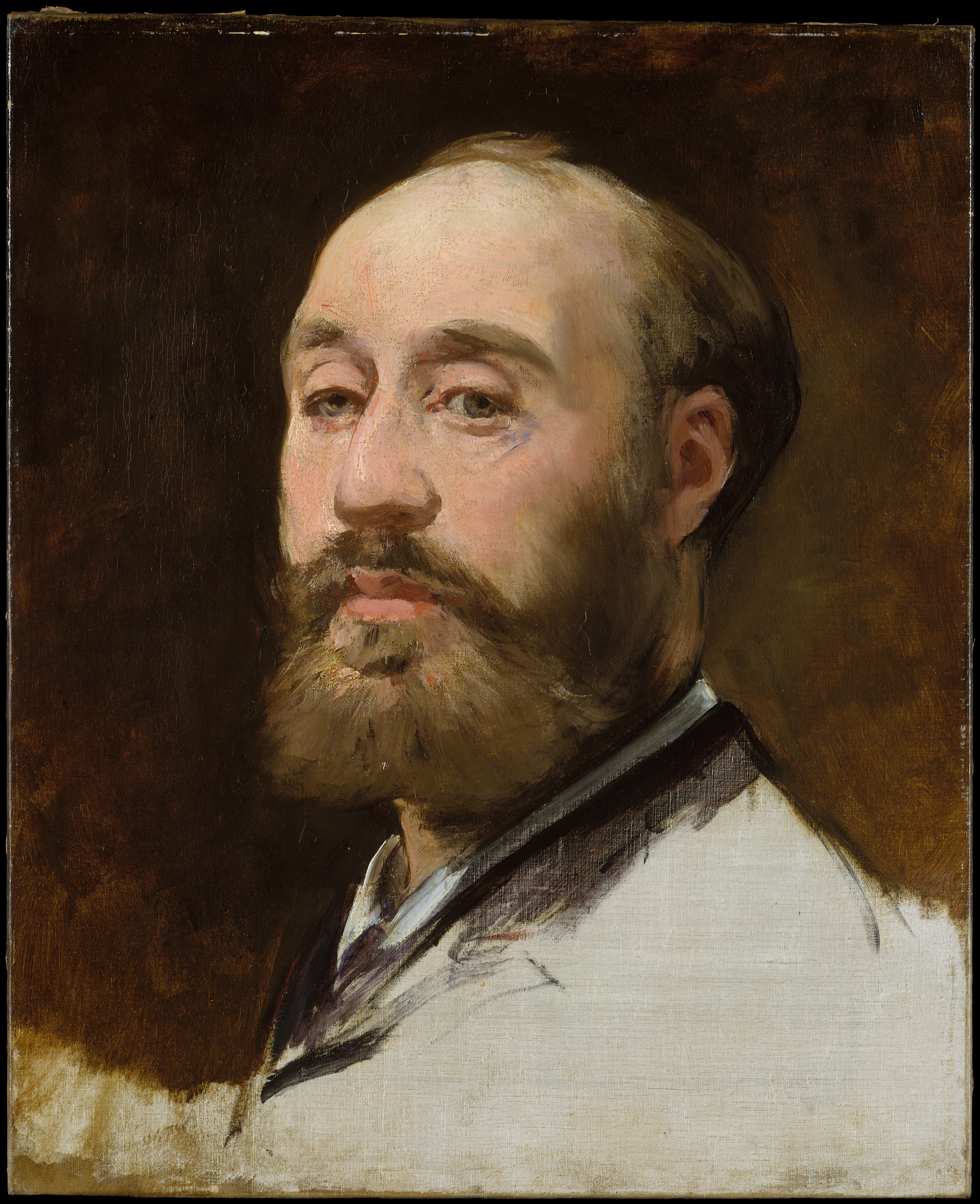
Unfinished portrait of Jean-Baptiste Faure by Édouard Manet

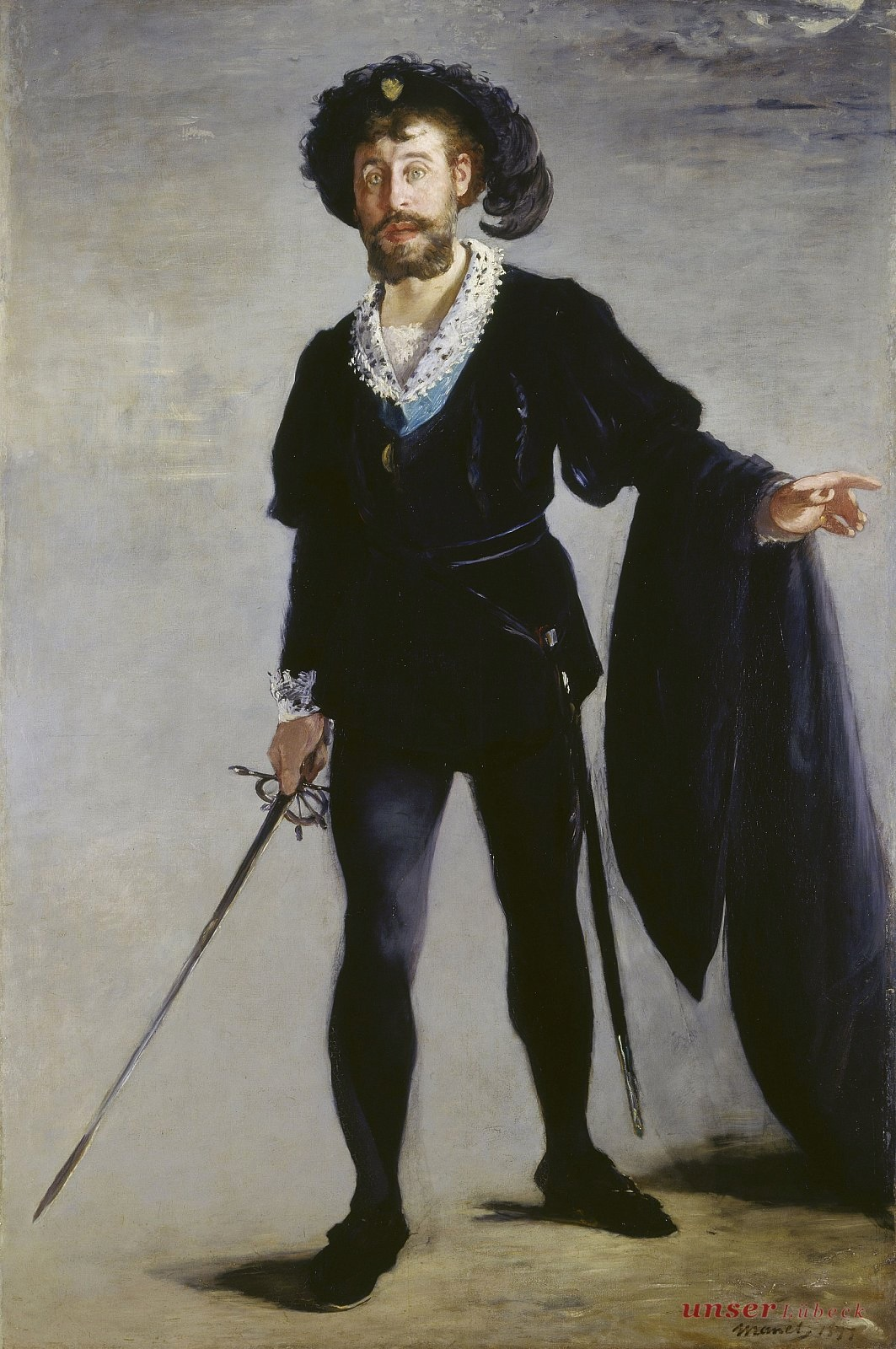
Jean-Baptiste Faure as Hamlet, painted by Édouard Manet in 1877

Jean-Baptiste Faure (French pronunciation: [ʒɑ̃batist fɔʁ]; 15 January 1830 – 9 November 1914) was a French operatic baritone and art collector who also composed several classical songs.

== Singing career ==
Faure was born in Moulins. A choirboy in his youth, he entered the Paris Conservatory in 1851 and made his operatic debut the following year at the Opéra-Comique, as Pygmalion in Victor Massé's Galathée. He remained at the Opéra-Comique for over seven years, singing baritone roles such as Max in Adolphe Adam's Le chalet and Michel in Thomas's Le caïd. During this time he also created the Marquis d'Erigny in Auber's Manon Lescaut (1856) and Hoël in Meyerbeer's Le pardon de Ploërmel (1859; later known as Dinorah), among seven premieres at that house.

He made his debut at the Royal Opera House, London, in 1860 as Hoël, and at the Paris Opera in 1861. He would sing at the Opera every season until 1869 and then again in 1872-76 and 1878. In addition, he continued to perform off and on in London until 1877 at venues such as Her Majesty's Theatre and the Theatre Royal, Drury Lane.

Among the many operas in which he appeared in Paris were Wolfgang Amadeus Mozart's Don Giovanni as well as L'étoile du nord, Les Huguenots and La favorite.

He also made history by creating several important operatic roles written by such prominent composers as Giacomo Meyerbeer, Giuseppe Verdi and Ambroise Thomas. They included the leading baritone parts in L'Africaine, Don Carlos and Hamlet (in 1865, 1867, and 1868 respectively).

His last stage appearances are recorded as taking place in Marseille and Vichy in 1886.

== Voice ==
Faure possessed a dark, smooth yet flexible baritone voice, which he used with impeccable skill and taste. He was a sophisticated interpretive artist, too, and all these accomplishments combined to make him one of the most significant figures to have appeared on the French musical stage during the 19th century. He wrote two books on singing, La Voix et le Chant (1886) and Aux Jeunes Chanteurs (1898), and also taught at the Paris Conservatory from 1857 to 1860.

The greatest of Faure's French heirs were the lyric bass Pol Plançon (1851–1914)—who modelled his vocal method directly on that of Faure—and Jean Lassalle (1847–1909), who succeeded Faure as principal baritone at the Paris Opera. Both Plançon and Lassalle made a number of recordings during the early 1900s, and their cultivated performances for the gramophone preserve key elements of Faure's singing style and technique.

Two non-commercial—and possibly unique—brown wax cylinders exist that are thought to be private recordings of Faure singing at around 70 years of age. Though there is no specific documentation of these recordings, one—a rendition of "Jardins de l'Alcazar... Léonor! viens" from Donizetti's La favorite—begins with an announcement (from either the singer or the (Pathé) recording engineer): "Le grand-père des barytons!" ("The grandfather of the baritones") Pathé and other French recordings from this era nearly always began with an announcement such as "Le sérénade de Don Juan, de Mozart, chanté par [baryton Jean] Lassalle, de l'Opéra!". The affectionate honorific in the supposed Faure cylinder recording only makes sense for a man of advanced years who is so beloved, celebrated, and revered by a general public that he need not even be named. The proliferation of documentation about Faure's standing as such points wholly and only to him. The choice of aria is almost certainly a clue as to the authenticity of the recording, as well. Alphonse of La favorite was one of Faure's most important roles—one with which he toured the provinces of France in 1877, just after his retirement from the stage. He gained enormous critical and popular notoriety from those who had not had a chance to hear him in Paris or London. His performances of this role would have left a lasting impression on the public and the press, and the aria was likely chosen for recording as an allusion to that time. A sampling of writing about Faure in this role and specifically this recitative and aria:

His voice is skilled in rendering the most violent as well as the gentlest emotions; and right royal is the way in which he sings the "Jardins de l'Alcazar"[...]

— critic, Journal de Bordeaux, March 1877

It was before a house crowded to the ceiling that the celebrated baritone sang the part of Alphonse in a manner thoroughly justifying the brilliant ovation of which he was the object[...] Only those persons who have heard the great artist in La Favorite can have any notion how much Donizetti's music gains in value and charm by such an interpreter. M. Faure is an exceptional singer, possessed of an admirable voice; he is also a first-rate actor. With what authority he sang the grand air of the second act, 'Palais [sic] de l'Alcazar'! What a striking expression of despite and irony he infused into the romance of the third act, 'Pour tant d'amour...'!

— critic, Le Progrès, February 12, 1877

== Other achievements ==
In addition, Faure composed several enduring songs, including a "Sancta Maria", "Les Rameaux" ("The Palms") and "Crucifix". (These latter two songs were recorded by Enrico Caruso, among others.) "Les Rameaux" was translated into English by Helen Tretbar. In 1876 he dedicated his valse-légende "Stella" to his sometime leading lady at the Paris Opéra, Gabrielle Krauss.

An avid collector of impressionist art, Faure sat for multiple portraits by Édouard Manet and owned 67 canvases by that painter, including the masterpiece Le déjeuner sur l'herbe and The Fifer. He also owned Le pont d'Argenteuil and 62 other works by Claude Monet. Part of his collection (which also contained paintings by Degas, Sisley, Pissarro, Ingres and Prud'hon) was kept at his villa "Les Roches" in Étretat, whose famous cliffs he commissioned Claude Monet to paint 40 times.

Faure died of natural causes in Paris in 1914, during the early months of World War I. According to his obituary in the New York Times, he had been made an officer of the Légion d'honneur. He was married to the singer Constance Caroline Lefèbvre (1828–1905).

== Roles ==
This list of known roles contains duplicates where Faure sang in an alternate language. Years indicate the debut of the role into his repertoire.

Sortable table
Role	Opera	Composer	Year
Amleto	Amleto (Hamlet in Italian)	Ambroise Thomas	1871
Alfonso D'Este, Duke of Ferrara	Lucrezia Borgia	Gaetano Donizetti	1876
Alphonse XI, King of Castille	La favorite	Gaetano Donizetti	1860
Assur	Semiramide	Gioachino Rossini	1875
Borromée	Marco Spada	Daniel Auber	1853
Cacico	Il Guarany	Antônio Carlos Gomes	1872
Charles VII	Jeanne d'Arc	Auguste Mermet	1872
Crèvecœur	Quentin Durward	François-Auguste Gevaert	1858
Don Giovanni	Don Giovanni	Wolfgang Amadeus Mozart	1861
Don Juan	Don Juan (Don Giovanni in French)	Wolfgang Amadeus Mozart	1866
Dulcamara	L'elisir d'amore	Gaetano Donizetti	1864
Falstaff	Le songe d'une nuit d'été	Ambroise Thomas	1854
Fernando	La gazza ladra	Gioachino Rossini	1860
Figaro	Le nozze di Figaro	Wolfgang Amadeus Mozart	1866
Gaspard	Der Freischütz	Carl Maria von Weber	1872
Guillaume Tell	Guillaume Tell	Gioachino Rossini	1861
Hamlet	Hamlet	Ambroise Thomas	1868
Hoël	Le pardon de Ploërmel	Giacomo Meyerbeer	1859
Hoël	Dinorah (Le pardon de Ploërmel in Italian)	Giacomo Meyerbeer	1860
Iago	Otello	Gioachino Rossini	1870
Il conte di Nevers	Gli Ugonotti (Les Huguenots in Italian)	Giacomo Meyerbeer	1876
Julien de Médicis	Pierre de Médicis	Józef Michal Poniatowski	1861
Justin	Le chien du jardinier	Albert Grisar	1855
Le Comte de Nevers	Les Huguenots	Giacomo Meyerbeer	1863
Le duc de Greenwich	Jenny Bell	Daniel Auber	1855
Le Marquis d'Hérigny	Manon Lescaut	Daniel Auber	1856
Lotario	Mignon	Ambroise Thomas	1870
Lysandre	Joconde ou Les coureurs d'aventures	Nicolas Isouard	1857
Malipieri	Haydée	Daniel Auber	1853
Max	Le chalet	Adolphe Adam	1853
Méphistophélès	Faust	Charles Gounod	1863
Michel	Le caïd	Adolphe Adam	1852
Nélusko	L'Africaine	Giacomo Meyerbeer	1865
Paddock	La coupe du roi de Thulé	Eugène Diaz	1873
Pedro	La mule de Pedro	Victor Massé	1863
Peters Michaeloff (Peter the Great)	L'étoile du nord	Giacomo Meyerbeer	1854
Pharaon	Moïse et Pharaon	Gioachino Rossini	1863
Pietro	La stella del nord (L'étoile du nord in Italian)	Giacomo Meyerbeer	1864
Pietro	La muette de Portici	Daniel Auber	1863
Pietro	Masaniello (La muette de Portici in Italian)	Daniel Auber	1853
Pietro Manelli	La Tonelli	Ambroise Thomas	1853
Polus	La fiancée de Corinthe	Jules Duprato	1867
Pygmalion	Galathée	Victor Massé	1852
Riccardo	I puritani	Vincenzo Bellini	1863
Rodolfo	La sonnambula	Vincenzo Bellini	1864
Rodrigue, Marquis of Posa	Don Carlos	Giuseppe Verdi	1867
St. Bris	Gli Ugonotti (Les Huguenots in Italian)	Giacomo Meyerbeer	1860
Torrida	Marco Spada	Daniel Auber	1854
Valbreuse	Le sylphe	Louis Clapisson	1856
