= Pol Plançon =

French operatic bass

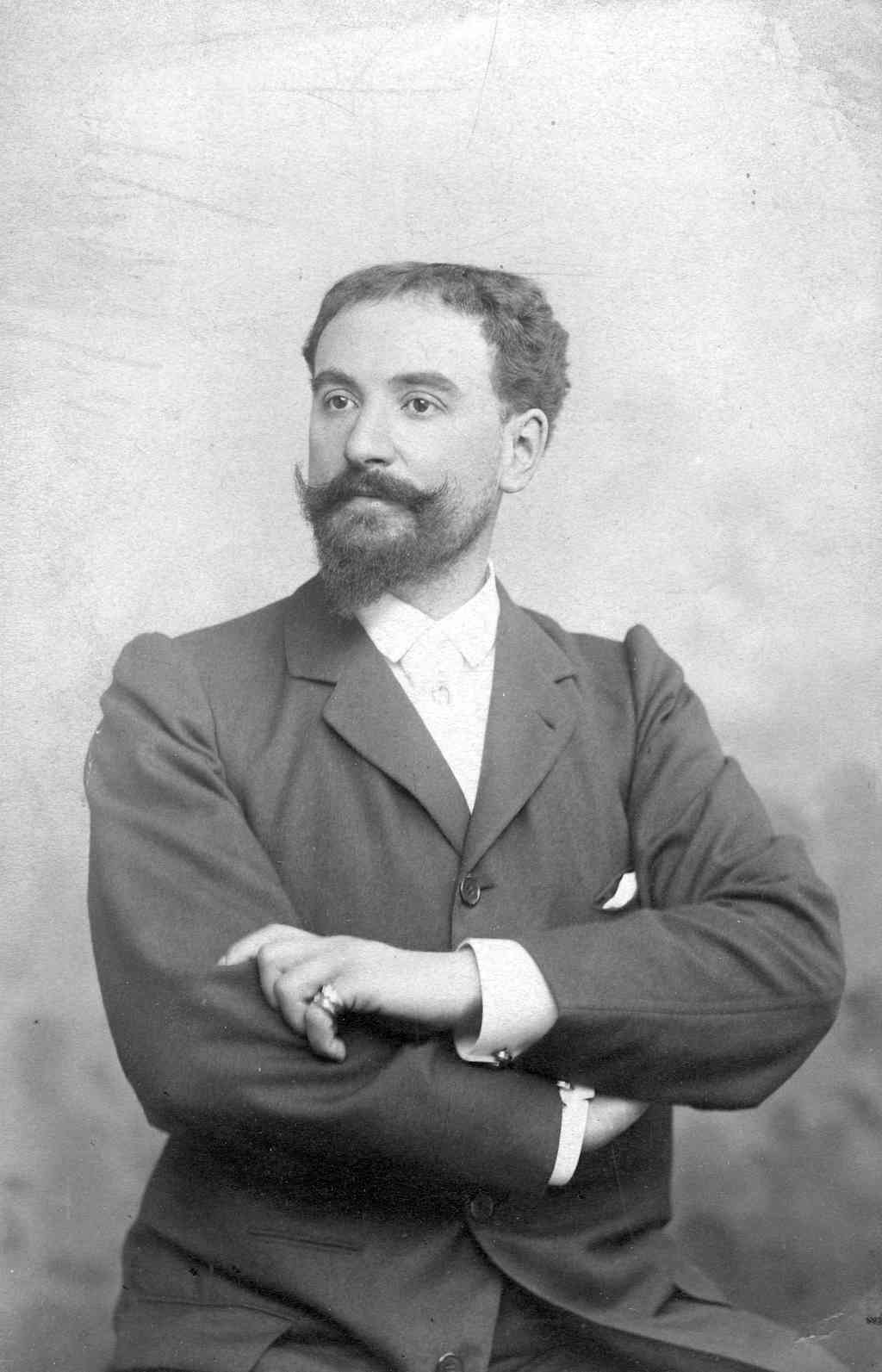
Pol Henri Plançon (1851–1914), French bass star of the Metropolitan Opera.

Pol Henri Plançon (French: [pɔl ɑ̃ʁi plɑ̃sɔ̃]; 12 June 1851 – 11 August 1914) was a French operatic bass (basse chantante). He was one of the most acclaimed singers active during the 1880s, 1890s and early 20th century—a period often referred to as the "Golden Age of Opera".

In addition to being among the earliest international opera stars to have made recordings, he was a versatile singer who performed roles ranging from Sarastro in Mozart's The Magic Flute to the core bass roles by Meyerbeer, Gounod, Verdi and Wagner, among others.

He was renowned for his legato singing as well as for his diction, tone, intonation, and mastery of ornaments and fioriture.

== Biography ==
Pol Plançon was born in Fumay, in the Ardennes département of France, near the Belgian border. "Pol" is a pet form of Paul.

=== Training ===
Blessed with a fine natural voice, he commenced learning to sing with the pivotal French tenor Gilbert Duprez (the originator of the "chest voice high C"), who had turned to teaching after his retirement from the stage. Duprez had enjoyed a distinguished career in Italy, where he created Edgardo in Donizetti's Lucia di Lammermoor in 1835. Plançon supplemented his studies with Duprez with lessons from Giovanni Sbriglia, who taught many outstanding opera singers at his Parisian studio, most notably the brothers Jean and Édouard de Reszke, with whom Plançon would sing quite often in future years.

In a 1905 interview with the New York Times newspaper, he said that he had modelled his technique on the vocal method of a celebrated predecessor, the baritone Jean-Baptiste Faure, who had been an idol of Parisian audiences during the 1860s and '70s.

=== Early career ===
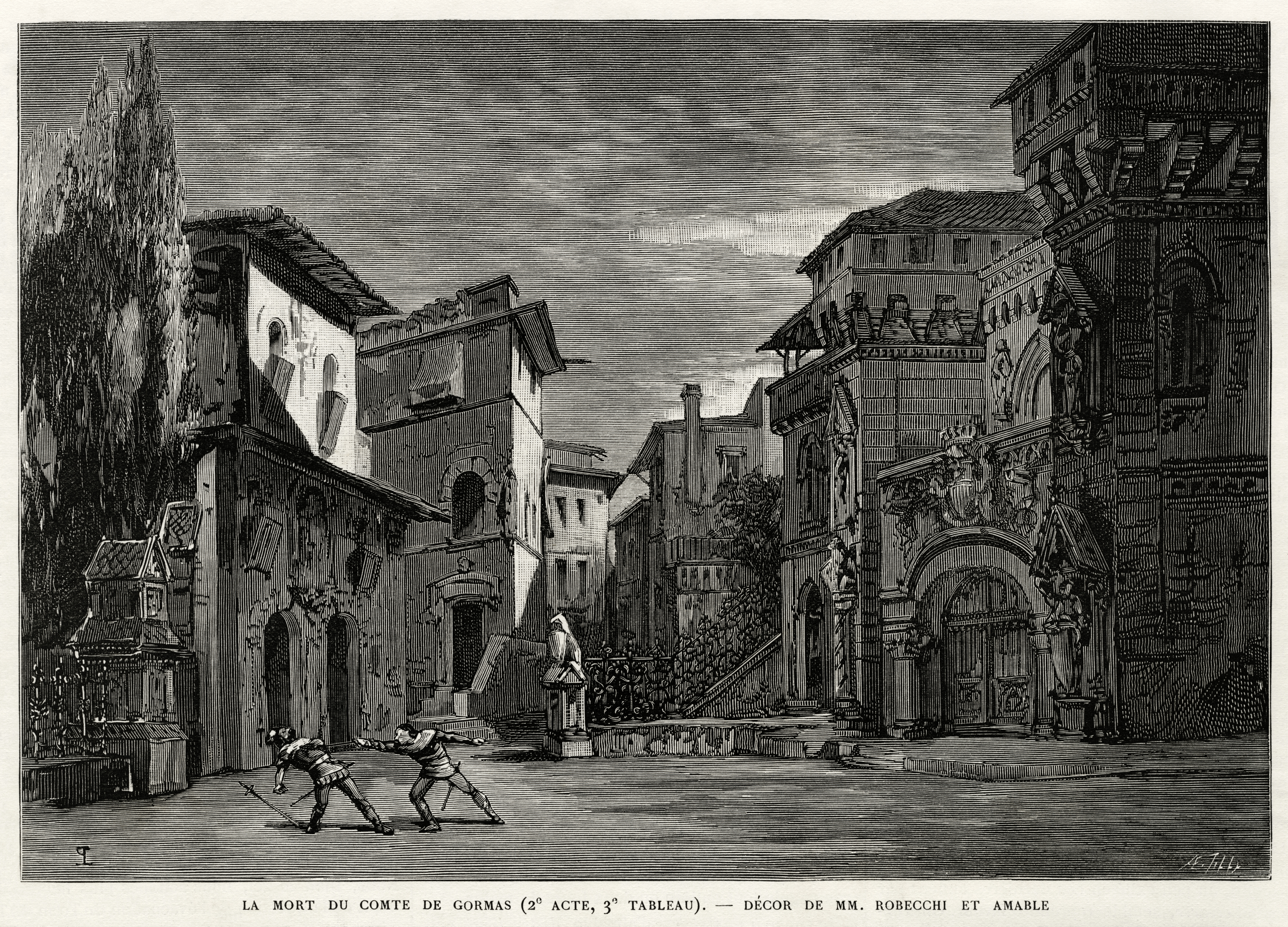
The death of Don Gormas; Act 2, Scene 3 of Le Cid, in the original production with Plançon as Gormas. From L'Illustration's coverage of the premiere.

The great bass debuted at the opera theatre in Lyon in 1877 in the role of Saint-Bris in Meyerbeer's Les Huguenots. He remained in Lyon until May 1879. He then moved to Paris and, in 1880, assumed the role of Colonna in Hippolyte Duprat's opera Petrarque at the Théâtre de la Gaîté-Lyrique de Paris.

Finally, in 1883, he received his first invitation to sing at the Paris Opera, successfully undertaking the part of Méphistophélès in Gounod's Faust. He would spend 10 years at the Paris Opera, participating in the 1885 premiere of Massenet's Le Cid in the role of Don Gormas (alongside the brothers de Reszke). Another notable operatic premiere that he participated in was that of Saint-Saëns's Ascanio on 21 March 1890, in which he sang the part of King Francis I. Appearing with him in Ascanio was a soon-to-be frequent soprano partner, America's Emma Eames. Eames' rival, the brilliant Australian soprano Nellie Melba, would also partner him on many occasions.

=== Success at Covent Garden ===
He performed on the European scene from 1891 to 1904, most importantly at the Royal Opera House, Covent Garden, in London, where he participated yet again in numerous premieres. One of these occurred on 11 June 1892, when he appeared in the first staging of The Light of Asia, by Isidore de Lara. Another premiere was of one of Cécile Chaminade's works.

Other operatic first performances that he graced with his presence included: on 20 June 1894, La Navarraise, by Massenet; on 30 June 1901, the operatic adaptation of Shakespeare's Much Ado About Nothing, by Sir Charles Stanford; in 1901, Le roi d'Ys, by Édouard Lalo; and in 1904, Hérodiade, by Massenet.

English commentators were enthusiastic about his contribution to these premieres, as well as his singing in the standard repertory roles, including Rocco in Ludwig van Beethoven's Fidelio, Méphistophélès in Faust, Ramfis in Verdi's Aida, Pogner in Wagner's Die Meistersinger von Nürnberg or Jupiter in Gounod's Philémon et Baucis. Only his portrayal of Mefistofele in the eponymous opera by Arrigo Boïto, essayed in 1895, was received with reservations by the music critics. They felt that Plançon's true home lay in the French and Italian bel canto repertory and as a consequence of this, Boïto's snarling demon was less suited to the singer's debonair demeanour than the urbane devil that he portrayed so effectively in Gounod's Faust.

=== The Metropolitan Opera years ===
It was in the height of his glory at Covent Garden that Plançon was brought to the Metropolitan Opera in New York City by the impresario Maurice Grau. He debuted there on 29 November 1893, as Jupiter in Gounod's Philémon et Baucis. He appeared in the seasons between 1893–97, 1898–1901 and 1903–08, and gave a total of 612 performances with the Metropolitan, including both operatic stagings and concert appearances, in New York and other American cities as part of the Met's touring ensemble. He sang Méphistophélès in Faust 85 times, and participated in the American stage premiere of Hector Berlioz's La Damnation de Faust in 1906, singing the role of that other famous French Mephisto. In 1899, he appeared in the inaugural performance of Mancinelli's opera Ero e Leandro 1899 (in the role of Ariofarne).

In 1906, he was staying in San Francisco with a visiting troupe of Met singers (including Enrico Caruso) when a powerful earthquake and fire devastated the city. He escaped the disaster shaken but unharmed. He left the Met in 1908, following a final appearance as Plunkett in Friedrich von Flotow's Martha at the house.

During the winter of 1896–1897, the Swiss-born American artist Adolfo Müller-Ury painted a portrait of him for the wealthy operetta composer Emma Marcy Raymond, which was subsequently exhibited in March 1897 at the Durand-Ruel Galleries in New York. Its current location is unknown.

=== Private life ===
Outside the theatre, his bearing reflected his cultivated stage presence. American and British newspaper reporters of the day portrayed him as a tall, immaculately groomed French gentleman with polite manners but a limited command of English. Nonetheless, prurient rumours about his personal conduct, implying that he was homosexual, circulated from time to time. "The New York critic James G. Huneker disliked his 'mincing gait' and complained of a 'lack of virility in his impersonations.' Whether this was fair comment or merely a biased critic's reaction to what was then hot gossip, is hard to know; it was widely rumoured that Plançon had been caught in his dressing room with the composer Herman Bemberg 'in flagrante delicto'." (See Michael Scott, The Record of Singing, published by Duckworth, London, 1978; page 84).

=== Retirement, death and historical significance ===
Upon his return to Paris at the age of 57, he retired from the hustle and bustle of the stage while still in excellent all-round voice, although the top notes of his range had begun to weaken. He occupied himself by giving lessons to select pupils. He was 63 years old when he died in the French capital in the summer of 1914, just as World War I was erupting in Europe.

He possessed a genuine bass voice, ranging from the top F down to a resonant and easy bottom D, although the light and nimble tone that he employed was suggestive of a higher-pitched instrument. From a musicological standpoint, his singing is of considerable historical interest because the refined vocal method that he employed was shaped prior to the advent of passionate, slice-of-life verismo opera in the 1890s. (To perform the verismo repertoire effectively, 20th-century singers were required to adopt a less elegant and less florid style of operatic vocalism than had hitherto been the norm.) Indeed, Plançon is considered to be one of the last important figures in a long line of exceptional French basses and baritones stretching back to the birth of operatic music's romantic era in the early decades of the 19th century. His predecessors and contemporaries in this Gallic bel canto tradition included such celebrated artists as Henri-Bernard Dabadie, Nicolas Levasseur, Luigi Lablache, Prosper Dérivis, Paul Barroilhet, Jean-Baptiste Faure, Victor Maurel, Jean Lassalle and Maurice Renaud.

During his 30-year career, Plançon's competition included his fellow countrymen Jean-François Delmas, Pedro Gailhard, Juste Nivette, Hippolyte Belhomme and Marcel Journet. Other rivals included Polish-born Édouard de Reszke, Bohemian-born Wilhelm Hesch, the Italians Francesco Navarini and Vittorio Arimondi and, from a younger generation of singers, the Russians Lev Sibiriakov and Feodor Chaliapin and the Pole Adamo Didur.

== Recordings ==
Pol Plançon recorded various songs, operatic arias and ensembles for the following firms: The Gramophone & Typewriter Company (His Master's Voice), forerunner of EMI (London, 1902–03), Zonophone (Paris, 1902), and the Victor Talking Machine Company (New York, 1903–08). He also is said to have recorded four privately made acoustic cylinders for Gianni Bettini's phonograph company in 1897, but no trace of them has been found. Most of his recordings have been reissued on LP or CD transfers. In 1993, the Romophone label issued a double CD set containing all 46 of his extant Victor records (catalogue number 82001-2). They open a window on to a vanished realm of 19th-century singing style and technical expertise.

== Repertoire ==
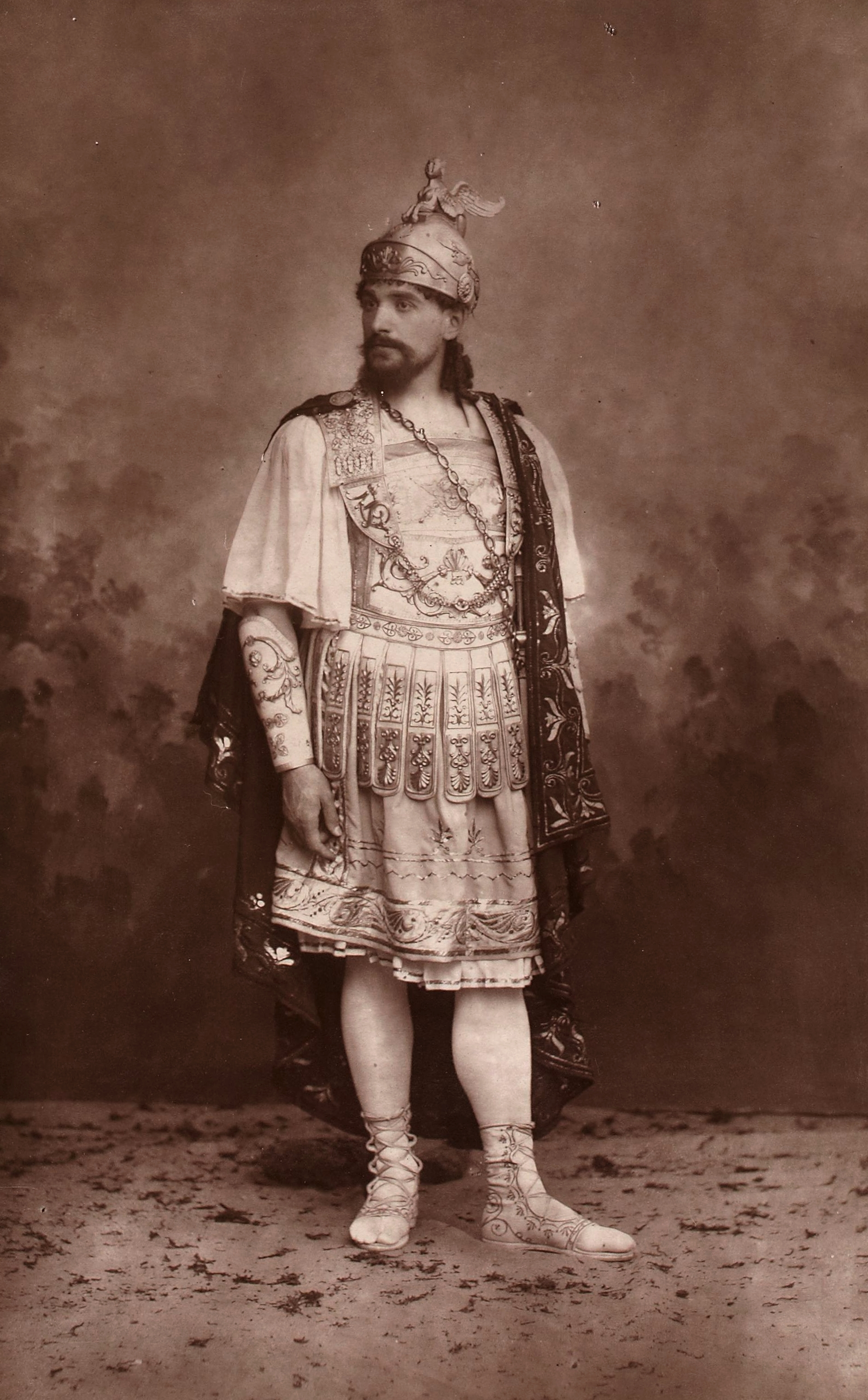
Pol Plançon in costume; photograph by Wilhelm Benque

This is as accurate an alphabetical list of Pol Plançon's stage roles (with their respective operas and composers appended) as extant sources permit:

- Abimélech, in Saint-Saëns's Samson and Delilah
- Alvise, in Amilcare Ponchielli's La Gioconda
- Ariofarne, in Luigi Mancinelli's Ero e Leandro
- Astolat, in Herman Bemberg's Elaine
- Balthazar, in Gaetano Donizetti's La favorite
- Bertram, in Giacomo Meyerbeer's Robert le diable
- Capulet, in Gounod's Roméo et Juliette
- Claudius, in Ambroise Thomas's Hamlet
- Colonna, in Duprat's Petrarque
- Des Grieux (Count), in Massenet's Manon
- Duke of Alba, in Émile Paladilhe's Patrie!
- Escamillo, in Georges Bizet's Carmen
- Eustache, in Saint-Saëns's Étienne Marcel
- François I, in Saint-Saëns's Ascanio
- Friar Abby, in Charles Villiers Stanford's "Much Ado About Nothing"
- Don Gormas, in Massenet's Le Cid
- Frére Laurent, in Gounod's Roméo et Juliette
- Garrido, in Massenet's La Navarraise
- Gesler, in Gioacchino Rossini's Guillaume Tell
- Grand Inquisitor, in Meyerbeer's L'Africaine
- Heinrich (King), in Richard Wagner's Lohengrin
- Hermann, in Wagner's Tannhäuser
- High Priest, in Meyerbeer's L'Africaine
- Jupiter, in Gounod's Philémon et Baucis
- King Henry, in Herbert Bunning's La Princesse Osra
- Lothario, in Thomas's Mignon
- Mefistofele, in Boito's Mefistofele
- Méphistophélès, in Gounod's Faust
- Méphistophélès, in Berlioz's La damnation de Faust
- Oberthal (Count), in Meyerbeer's Le prophète
- Old Hebrew, in Saint-Saëns's Samson and Delilah
- Pittacus, in Gounod's Sapho
- Plunkett, in Flotow's Martha
- Pogner, in Wagner's Die Meistersinger von Nürnberg
- Ramfis, in Giuseppe Verdi's Aida
- Rocco, in Ludwig van Beethoven's Fidelio
- Rodolfo, in Vincenzo Bellini's La sonnambula
- Saint Bris (Count of), in Meyerbeer's Les Huguenots
- Sarastro, in Wolfgang Amadeus Mozart's The Magic Flute.

== Sources ==
- Warrack, John and West, Ewan (1992), The Oxford Dictionary of Opera, Oxford University Press, London, ISBN 0-19-869164-5
- Scott, Michael (1978), The Record of Singing, Duckworth, London.
- Steane, John (1974), The Grand Tradition, Duckworth, London.
