= Charles Séchan =

French painter

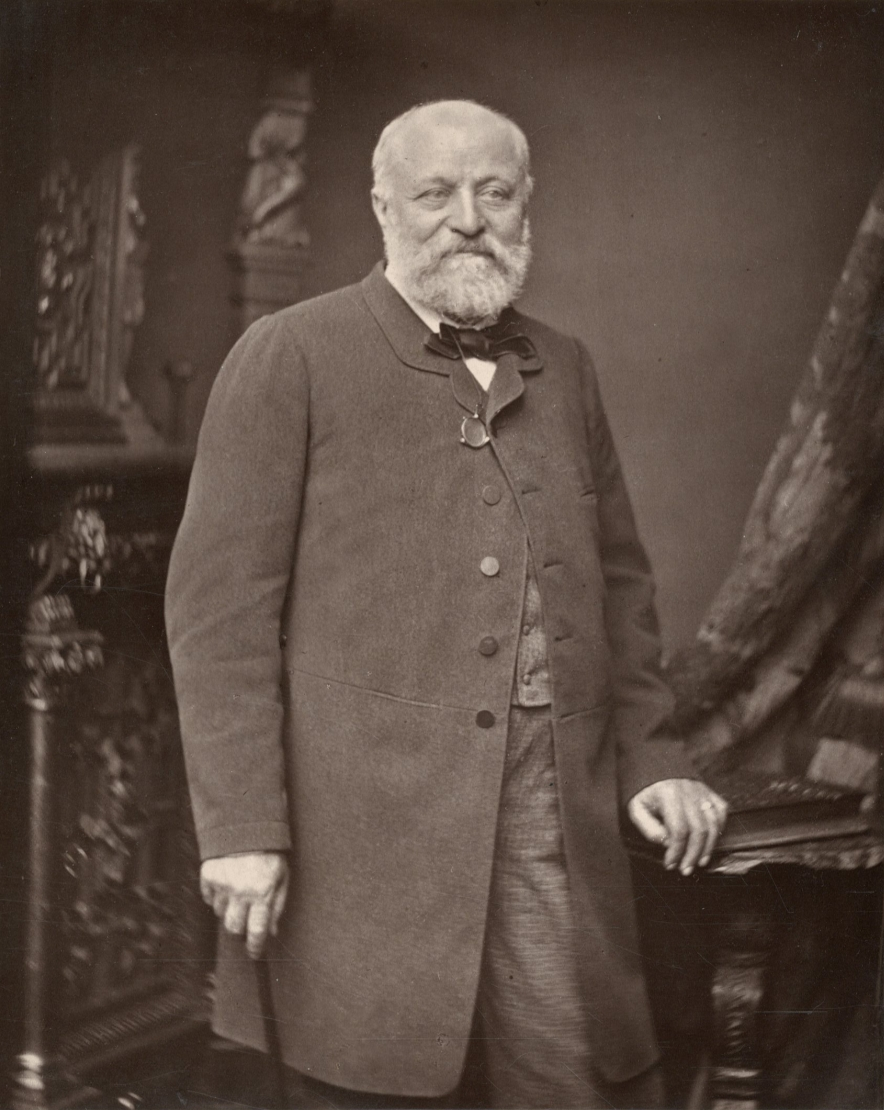
Charles Séchan.

Charles Polycarpe Séchan (29 June 1803 – 14 September 1874) was a French painter and theatre designer.

== Life ==
Born in Paris, son of the tailor merchant Jean-Fris Séchan, he lost his parents, who had no fortune, very early on. He learned the first elements of drawing from a humble local school. He made his first steps in the career by entering the studio of Lefèvre, decorator of the Théâtre de la Porte-Saint-Martin. He created the sets of Périnet Leclerc, by Lockroy and Auguste Anicet-Bourgeois, and particularly the one representing a Vue du vieux Paris, was executed entirely on his drawings. After four or five years in the Lefèvre workshop, he moved to the Ciceri workshop, the first and most famous in his time.

Recommended by the marquis de la Valette, he was commissioned by the sultan Abdulmejid I to create the decoration of the new Dolmabahçe Palace.

His memoirs, Souvenirs d'un homme de théâtre 1831-1855, were published in 1883.

== Bibliography ==
- Charles Séchan (1883). Souvenirs d'un homme de théâtre 1831-1855; recueillis par Adolphe Badin (in French). Paris: Calmann-Lévy. p. 322..
