= Léon Melchissédec =

French opera singer

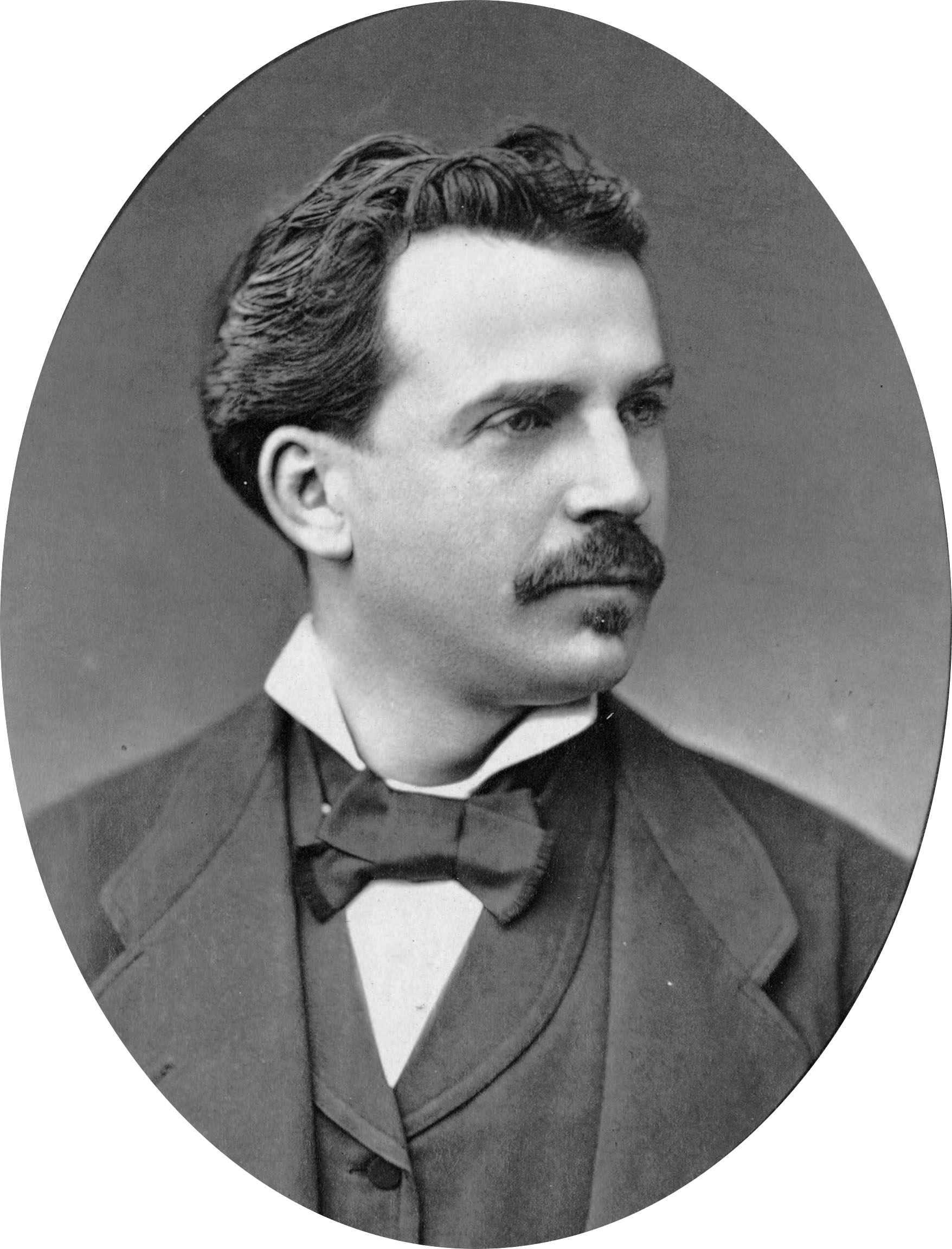
Léon Melchissédec; photograph by Alphonse Liébert (c.1860)

Léon Melchissédec (born Clermont Ferrand, 7 May 1843, died Neuilly-sur-Seine 23 March 1925) was a French baritone who enjoyed a long career in the French capital across a broad range of operatic genres, and later made some recordings and also taught at the Paris Conservatoire.

== Life and career ==
He played second violin in the Théâtre de Saint-Étienne before coming to Paris to study. After classes with Alkan, Puget, Mocker and Levasseur at the Paris Conservatoire, where he won a first prize in 1865, he made his debut at the Paris Opéra-Comique on 16 July 1866 in Cohen's José Maria.

Remaining at the Opéra-Comique until 1877, Melchissédec’s repertoire included Les Absents, Le premier jour de bonheur, Lalla-Roukh, Robinson Crusoé, Les dragons de Villars, Le pré aux clercs, Fantasio, Mireille, Richard Cœur de Lion and Le caïd. In 1873 he became the first true baritone to sing the title role of Zampa (as opposed to a singer of mixed voice).

He moved next to the Théâtre-Lyrique, singing in Dimitri, Le capitaine Fracasse and the premieres of Paul et Virginie and Le timbre d’argent. In 1879 he joined the Paris Opéra, making his debut as Nevers in Les Huguenots on 17 November 1879. His repertoire there included Guillaume Tell, L'Africaine, La Favorite, Rigoletto, Faust, and he created roles in Le Tribut de Zamora, Tabarin, and Le Cid. Having sung Capulet in the first performance of Roméo et Juliette at the Opéra-Comique in 1873, he sang Mercutio when it transferred to the repertory of the Opéra.

Melchissédec left the Opéra in 1891 but rejoined from 1905–12, having become a professor of déclamation lyrique at the Paris Conservatoire in 1894. In 1913, he published a treatise on singing entitled ‘Pour Chanter : ce qu’il faut savoir’.

His recordings on Pathé, APGA, Zonophone and Odeon included La Marseillaise (de Lisle) and excerpts from Les dragons de Villars, Faust and L'Africaine. The majority of his recordings is considered lost, a compilation of 18 surviving records was reissued on CD by Marston Records. According to Michael Scott, due to his age at the time of recording in the early 1900s these may only give a partial impression of his singing. However, an unusually well-recorded 1899 Berliner disc of the "Air du tambour-major" from Ambroise Thomas's Le caïd, which can also be heard at the Bibliothèque nationale de France's website, shows that even in his mid-fifties he still had a ringing high baritone, a brilliant trill, and extremely precise passage-work that justifies his reputation.

Grove commends his “fine voice and magnificent technique”. After his death his wife left his archive to the Musée d'Art Roger Quilliot in Clermont Ferrand.
