= Auguste Mermet =

French composer (1810–1889)

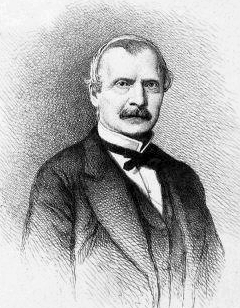
Auguste Mermet

Auguste Mermet (French pronunciation: [ɔɡyst(ə) mɛʁmɛ]; 5 January 1810 – 4 July 1889) was a French opera composer.

== Biography ==
Born in Brussels, Mermet was the son of an officer in the Grande Armée and originally intended to have a military career, but after learning to play the flute and later privately studying music composition with Jean-François Le Sueur and Fromental Halévy, abandoned the army in favour of music.

In his youth, he already composed a two-act opéra-comique, La Bannière du roi, with a libretto by Pierre Carmouche, which was first performed at Versailles in April 1835. Alexandre Soumet then accepted to transform for him his tragedy about Saul into a libretto of drame lyrique. Mermet composed the score for this work, which was performed without success at the Paris Opera in 1846 under the title of Le Roi David with Rosine Stoltz as David.

His Roland à Ronceveaux, for which he wrote the libretto and the music, was staged in 1864 after Napoléon III transferred the management of the Opéra to the theatre. This work had received 65 performances by 1867, a success at least partly due to its patriotic flavour and spectacular staging.

Mermet also composed a four-act opera, Jeanne d'Arc, to his own libretto based on a play by Jules Barbier, which was the first premiere to be presented at the Palais Garnier (5 April 1876). Gabrielle Krauss sang the title role, and Jean-Baptiste Faure was Charles VII, the ballet was choreographed by Louis Mérante, but the opera received only 15 performances, the last on 27 November. Tchaikovsky used Mermet's libretto as one of the sources for his opera The Maid of Orleans.

Hugh Macdonald, writing in The New Grove Dictionary of Opera, described his music as "direct, attractive, unadventurous, and noisy" and as modeled on Meyerbeer and Halévy.

== Selected works ==
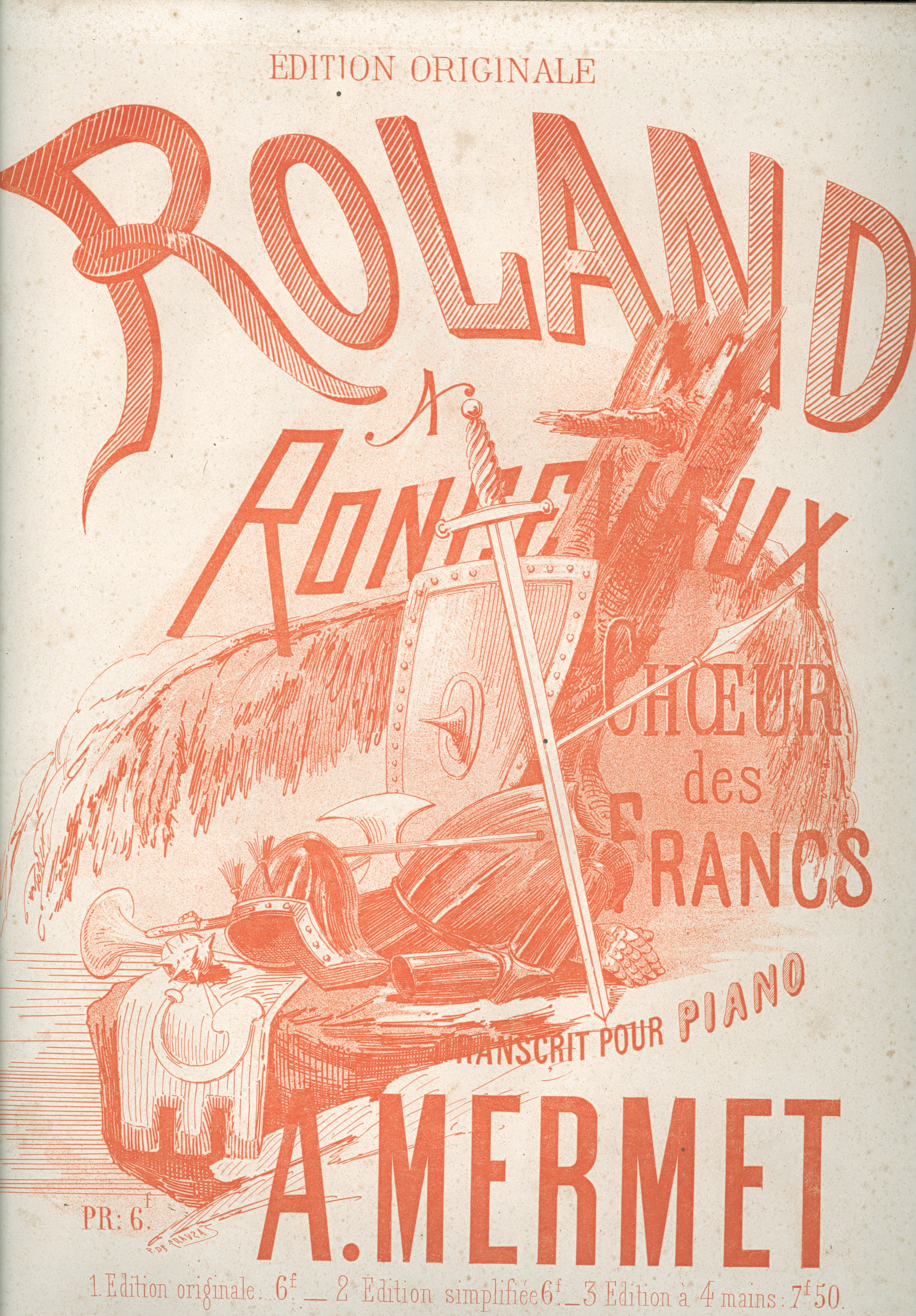
Music cover for Auguste Mermet's four-act opera, Roland à Roncevaux , circa 1864.

- La Bannière du roi (April 1835, Versailles)
- Le Roi David (3 June 1846, Paris Opera, Salle Le Peletier)
- Roland à Roncevaux (3 October 1864, Paris Opéra, Salle Le Peletier)
- Jeanne d'Arc (5 April 1876, Paris Opéra, Palais Garnier). With six complete sets by Jean-Baptiste Lavastre, his brother Antoine, Eugène Carpezat, Charles Cambon, Auguste Rubé, Philippe Chaperon and Jean-Louis Chéret.

== Bibliography ==
- David Cairns: Berlioz, volume 2: Servitude and Greatness, 1832–1869 (Berkeley, California: University of California Press, 1999); ISBN 978-0-520-22200-7.
- François-Joseph Fétis: Biographie universelle des musiciens, supplement, volume 2 (Paris: Firmin-Didot, 1862); View at Google Books.
- Hugh Macdonald: "Mermet, Auguste", in Stanley Sadie (ed.): The New Grove Dictionary of Opera, four volumes (London: Macmillan, 1992), ISBN 978-1-56159-228-9, vol. 3, p. 343.
- Stéphane Wolff: L'Opéra au Palais Garnier (1875–1962) (Paris: Deposé au journal L'Entr'acte, 1962; reprint Paris: Slatkine, 1983); ISBN 978-2-05-000214-2.
