= Jean-Louis Pichon =

French theatre director (1948–2025)

- Pichon c. 2000
- Born: 18 September 1948; Saint-Étienne, France
- Died: c. 4 March 2025 (aged 76); Saint-Étienne, France
- Occupations: Opera manager; Opera director; Festival director; Actor
- Organizations: Opéra de Saint-Étienne; Massenet Festival

Jean-Louis Pichon (French: [ʒɑ̃lwi piʃɔ̃]; 18 September 1948 – c. 4 March 2025) was a French stage director, opera manager and author. He was manager of the Opéra de Saint-Étienne from 1983 to 2008, dedicated to the French repertoire, where he co-founded and directed the Massenet Festival around the works of Jules Massenet who was born there. Some performances were recorded, and shared with other French theatres and abroad. Pinchon also directed operas at the Opéra-Comique in Paris, the Municipal Theatre of Santiago in Chile, and other theatres in France and abroad.

== Life and career ==
Pichon was born in Saint-Étienne on 18 September 1948. He studied classics, writing a thesis devoted to Racine's work. He then turned to theatre as both an actor and a director. He first directed the world premiere of Gabriel Marcel's Monde Cassé at the Alliance Française Theatre in 1971, playing the role of Antonnof. He performed in the great classics (Britannicus, Andromaque, Le Cid, Le Jeu de l'Amour et du Hasard, Hamlet, Les Femmes Savantes) and also played in temporary theatre by Beckett and Pinter, among others. He directed plays including Molière's Le Médecin malgré lui and Tartuffe, Ionesco's Le Roi se meurt, Anouilh's Monsieur Barnett, Sartre's Huis Clos and Beckett's En attendant Godot. Pichon always had a passion for opera, and turned to directing operas. His first production was Roussel's Le testament de la tante Caroline.

He was manager of the Opéra de Saint-Étienne from 1983 to 2008, dedicated to the French repertoire, especially works by Jules Massenet who was born there. He chose Jean-Pierre Jacquillat as music director who shared his enthusiasm about Massenet but died in a car accident in 1986. For the premiere of Massenet's Amadis in 1988, Pichon won the conductor Patrick Fournillier. It was recorded by Radio France, and also commercially recorded with choir and orchestra of the Opéra de Paris, awarded the Orphée d'Or from the National Academy of Opera. Pichon then staged in 1989, in commemoration of the bicentenary of the French Revolution, Massenet's Thérèse, which represented France at the European Festival of Culture in Karlsruhe and was also played in Łódź and Zagreb. His production of Richard Cœur de Lion by Grétry was staged at the opera Opéra national de Lorraine in Nancy.

In 1990 Pichon co-founded with Fournillier the biennial Massenet Festival and served as its artistic director. The festival not only offered Massenet's rarely played operas, first Cléopâtre, but also other compositions, and was accompanied by a symposium in collaboration with the University of St. Etienne. The second festival offered Massenet's Esclarmonde, earning him an invitation to the Teatro Massimo in Palermo to stage the work in 1993, conducted by Gianandrea Gavazzeni. The festival also presented a concert version of Grisélidis and the oratorio La Terre Promise. In 1993 Pichon staged Bellini's Il Pirata, also at Nancy and at the Tours Opera, before accepting the invitation of the National Opera of Montevideo to stage a new production of Verdi's Macbeth. In March 1994, he produced Puccini's Turandot. The Opéra Royal de Wallonie asked him to direct Bizet's Carmen.

The third festival showed Massenet's Panurge, and the fourth Thaïs, the latter taken up by the Nantes Opera in 1997 before representing France in Cairo for France-Egypt year. Pichon directed Boieldieu's La Dame Blanche at the Opéra-Comique in Paris in 1997.

In the 1998–99 season he directed a new production of Massenet's Roma at the Festival della Valle d'Itria in Martina Franca and at the Teatro Massimo. The 1999-2000 season saw the revival of Le roi de Lahore, the composer's first success, staged at the Massenet Festival and at the Grand Théâtre de Bordeaux, delayed because the opera house in St. Etienne had been destroyed by arson, including much of the scenic design.

In 2001, the Martina Franca Festival invited Pichon him to revive Gounod's La reine de Saba. The house in St. Etienne was reopened in 2001 by Massenet's Hérodiade, taken up at the Royal Opera in Wallonia in May 2002. The sixth festival showed Massenet's Roma.

During the 2002–03 season, he created a new production of Poulenc's Dialogues des Carmélites in Saint-Etienne. For the seventh festival, in 2003, he directed Massenet's Sapho, conducted by Laurent Campellone. He produced at the Martina Franca Festival in July 2004 Gounod's rarely played Polyeucte, and directed a French version of Salome by R. Strauss in collaboration with the Opéra de Nice. He staged Turandot in Bordeaux. In 2005 he directed Massenet's Le jongleur de Notre-Dame for the eighth Festival.

In 2005, he presented Dialogues des Carmélites in Municipal Theatre of Santiago in Chile and staged Werther in Bordeaux in 2006, then Polyeucte in Saint-Etienne. In June 2006, he directed Bizet's Les pêcheurs de perles with the Shanghai Opera House before going back to Santiago for a new production of Ponchielli's La Gioconda. In February 2007, Jean-Louis Pichon staged Lalo's Le roi d'Ys in St. Etienne. For the ninth festival, his last, he directed a new production of Massenet's Ariane.

Pichon was a member of the jury of the Operalia voice competition from 2001. In 2024 he founded an association to support young singers, L’Arbre deux vies.

Pichon's body was found in Saint-Étienne on 4 March 2025. He was 76.
