= Philip Booth (bass) =

American operatic bass

Philip Booth (born 1942) is an American operatic bass who is chiefly associated with the basso profundo repertoire. Now retired from performance, he was particularly active with the Metropolitan Opera in New York City where he gave more than 400 performances from 1975 to 1995.

== Career ==
A native of Arlington, Virginia, Booth studied singing at the Eastman School of Music with Julius Huehn and with Todd Duncan in Washington D.C. He began his singing career as a member of the United States Army Chorus from 1966 to 1970. In 1970 he won 2nd prize in the Metropolitan Opera National Council Auditions, with June Anderson in 3rd place and Jeannine Altmeyer in 1st place. That same year he achieved his first critical success singing in concert with the Lake George Opera. He made his professional opera debut in 1971 at the Kennedy Center as the King of Scotland in Handel's Ariodante.

From 1971 to 1974 Booth was committed to the San Francisco Opera. He made his debut with the company as one of the young lovers in a production of Karl Orff's Carmina Burana.

On October 16, 1975, Booth made his debut at the Metropolitan Opera as Tom in Verdi's Un ballo in maschera with Nicolai Gedda is Ricardo, Roberta Peters as Oscar, and Henry Lewis conducting. He went on to sing more than 30 roles with the company over the next two decades, including Basilio in The Barber of Seville, Colline in La bohème, Count Ceprano in Rigoletto, Dansker in Billy Budd, Don Fernando in Fidelio, Dr. Grenvil in La traviata, both Fafner and Fasolt in The Ring Cycle, Grégorio in Roméo et Juliette, Gualtiero in I puritani, the Jailer in Tosca, the Marquis de Calatrava in La Forza del Destino, Osmin in The Abduction from the Seraglio, Pimen in Boris Godunov, both Ramfis and the King in Aida, Schmidt in Andrea Chénier, Talpa in Il tabarro, Truffaldin in Ariadne auf Naxos, Wagner in Faust, and Zuniga in Carmen among others. His final performance at the Met was on December 21, 1995, as Schwarz in Wagner's Die Meistersinger von Nürnberg with Bernd Weikl as Hans Sachs, Karita Mattila as Eva, Ben Heppner as Walther von Stolzing, and James Levine conducting.

In addition to performing at the Met, Booth also appeared in productions at the Caramoor International Music Festival, the Houston Grand Opera, the New York City Opera, and the San Diego Opera among others. In 1976 he made his debut at the Santa Fe Opera as La Notte in the American premiere of Francesco Cavalli's L'Egisto. He was also seen in Santa Fe that year as Daniel Webster in Virgil Thomson's The Mother of Us All; a production which was recorded on disc. He later returned to Santa Fe in 1980 to perform the role of Sarastro in The Magic Flute and Prince Gremin in Eugene Onegin. In 1989 he notably portrayed the role of Pantalone De' Bisognos in the American premiere of Pietro Mascagni's Le maschere at the Washington National Opera. He married mezzo-soprano Sandra Bush.

== Recordings ==
- Jules Massenet: Esclarmonde (November 8, 1974, live broadcast). Clifford Grant (The Emperor Phorcas), Joan Sutherland (Esclarmonde), Huguette Tourangeau (Parséis), Giacomo Aragall (The Chevalier Roland), William Harness (Enéas), Philip Booth (Cléomen, King of France), Robert Kerns (The Bishop of Blois), Gary Burgess (A Saracen Envoy, A Byzantine Herald), War Memorial Opera House Orchestra and Chorus, cond. Richard Bonynge. Living Stage. 1110 (2CDs), MONO (quasi-stereo).
- Virgil Thomson: The Mother of Us All Mignon Dunn, Philip Booth, Karen Beck, Sondra Stowe, Jimmie Lu Null, William Lewis, Steven Loewengart, Thomas Parker, Marla McDaniels, D'Artagnan Petty, Stephen Bryant, Ashley Putnam, et al.; Conductor: Raymond Leppard; Santa Fe Opera Orchestra and Chorus. Recorded in Santa Fe, New Mexico, 1977. Label: New World Records
