= Gérard Condé =

French composer and music critic

Gérard Condé (born 26 January 1947) is a French composer and music critic.

== Life ==
Born in Nancy, Condé was first self-taught until 1965 then studied harmony at the Conservatoire de Nancy before following the teaching of Max Deutsch (composition) in Paris between 1969 and 1972. He joined the daily Le Monde in 1975. He also contributes to various publications, such as L'Avant-scène Opéra and Opéra international and produces programmes on France Musique.

As a composer, he writes in a technique derived from serial music.

== Work ==
=== Compositions ===
- Mémorial, for baritone and string quintet (1972; Éditions musicales transatlantiques 1980) · OCLC 10400862
- Fêtes galantes, recitation with piano, poems by Verlaine (1973) (éd. Éditions Henry Lemoine)
- Mélodie, scene for soprano, clarinet and piano (1974)
- Darjeeling, ritual for a singer preparing tea (1976)
- Il était une fois, pour violoncelliste raconteur/se (1977)
- Dans la résonance du cri, for piano (1978)
- Rondo varié, pour tubiste lecteur (1978)
- Lovely Madeline, ballad for a guitarist (1979)
- Rhapsodie, mimodrama for a bassoonist (1979)
- Scherzando un poco, for flute quartet (1979)
- Trio à cordes No 1 (1980)
- Rêve d'amour, action musicale d'après Franz Liszt pour contrebassiste narrateur, soprano, clarinet basse, chœur d'hommes et ensemble instrumental (1981) Création Radio-France, 30 October 1989 (éd. Durand).
- Invocations for baritone and saxophone quartet on poems by Baudelaire and Huysmans (1981–1983) (Max Eschig publishing house) — State commission.
- Monarch of Gods and Daemons, parabole scénique pour un(e) saxophoniste jouant 5 instruments (1983)
- Éclats, for violin and viola (1984) commissioned by the Festival de La Rochelle
- Intenso, for viola and cello (1985)
- Amoroso, duetto for a clarinetist (1985)
- Traces (Trio à cordes No 2) (1986) premiere, Trio à cordes de Paris, festival d'Ambronay 1988 (éd. Durand).
- Culbutes, for 16 instruments (1986), Commission from Radio France. Premiere, 27 June 1987)
- Infusoires, for flute, clarinet, violin, cello and piano (1987) (éd. Durand)
- Le Mont des oliviers, cantata for soprano and basset horn on a poem by Alfred de Vigny, commissioned by the GRAME (1987)
- Élans for cello and piano (1988) (éd. Durand)
- Le Chant du silence for baritone and orchestra (1992) Commission from Radio-France. Premiered January 9, 1993.
- Les miracles de l'enfant Jésus, for children's choir (1994) commissioned by the Maîtrise de Radio France
- Éveil, for orchestra (1995) commission from Musique nouvelle en liberté
- Lointains for clarinet flute, piano, harp and string quartet, "Hommage à Paul Cézanne". (1996)
- La Chouette enrhumée, lyrical tale after Oscar Wilde (1996) — State commission.
- Salima sac à ruses, comic opera for all audiences after One Thousand and One Nights (1999) — Commission from the Beaumarchais Foundation
- Léon le caméléon, musical tale for narrator and 17 musicians (2000), State commission.
- Une larme du diable, Musical fantasy after Théophile Gautier for narrator and 7 musicians (2001)
- De Barque à Barque, 8 poems by Yves Bonnefoy for mezzo and piano (2001)
- Les Orages désirés romantic opera about Berlioz's childhood. Booklet by Christian Wasselin (2003) - commissioned by Radio France.
- Après le pas, poem by Silvia Baron Supervielle for voice and piano (2004)
- Les Chansons de Rabbi Moshé, Jewish stories for baritone and piano (2005)
- Pour garder le jour, sevan poems by François Cheng for mixed a cappella choir (2006)
- Sur les Hauts, for alto saxophone and harmony orchestra (2007) - Commissioned by the Conseil Général des Vosges.
- Vision, for soprano or tenor and piano, poem by Baudelaire (2007) - Commissioned by the city of Épinal.
- Thoueris, solo for euphonium (2007)
- Marie! four poems by Ronsard for tenor and piano (2009)
- String quartet (2010)
- Écrit sur nuage, 7 poems by Ernest Pépin for recitation, piano, clarinet and cello (2012)
- Humeurs for solo oboe (ed. L'ill aux roseaux) (2012) - Commissioned by the Association française du hautbois
- Per amica silentia, 4 poems by Verlaine for mezzo or baritone and piano (2014)
- Messe de Sainte-Adresse, for mixed choir and organ (2012–2015)
- Les Litanies de Satan, poem by Baudelaire for baritone and piano (2017) — Commission of the Francis Poulenc Academy.

=== Publications ===
==== Books ====
- Le piano, révélateur de l'orchestre chez Massenet, series "Observatoire musical français, Série histoire de la musique et analyse" (No. 7), Université de Paris-Sorbonne, 2003 OCLC 457045360
- Charles Gounod (in French). Paris: Fayard. 2009. p. 1086. ISBN 978-2-213-63249-0. OCLC 495195514. — Prix Bernier de l’Institut; Grand Prix des Muses.

==== Articles ====
Music journalism

L'Est républicain (May/June 1972) L'Écran lorrain (1971–1974), Le Guide musical (1973–1975), Nouvelle Revue des Deux Mondes (1975), Harmonie (1975–1980), Lyrica (1975–1980) Opéra (1974–1976), Opéra International (1977–1978 / 1986–2005), Opéra Magazine (since 2005), Le Monde de la musique (1978–1980 / 1990–2005), Mélomane (Radio France) (1991–2000), Diapason (since 2006), Le Monde (about 4000 articles from April 1975 to September 2014)

Musicographic texts

- Literary and musical commentary, for L'Avant-Scène-Opéra, of texts by Auber (La Muette de Portici), Berlioz (Les Troyens, Béatrice et Bénédict, La Damnation de Faust), Berg (Lulu), Bizet (Les Pêcheurs de perles), G. Charpentier (Louise), Chausson (le Roi Arthus), Debussy (Pelléas et Mélisande), Gounod (Faust, Mireille), Hersant (Le Château des Carpates), Massenet (Le Roi de Lahore, Hérodiade, Manon, Le Cid, Werther, Esclarmonde, Thaïs, Le Portrait de Manon, La Navarraise, Sapho, Grisélidis, Don Quichotte, Panurge) Meyerbeer (Les Huguenots, Le Prophète), Mozart (La clemenza di Tito), Reimann (Lear), Rossini (Guillaume Tell), Weber (Euryanthe).
- Nearly two hundred texts for the opera house programs of the Opéra national du Rhin (50), the Théâtre du Châtelet (30), the Théâtre des Champs-Élysées (16), the Opéra de Paris, the Massenet Festival in Saint-Étienne (analyses “format Avant-scène” of Roma, Ariane, Marie-Magdeleine, Le Jongleur de Notre-Dame), of the Opéra de Montpellier (Sigurd); abroad: La Monnaie of Brussels, English National Opera; Liceu of Barcelona, Teatro Real of Madrid, Operas of Geneva, Rome, Liège, Antwerp, Stuttgart.
- More than two hundred texts for the symphonic hall programmes of the orchestras of Radio France, the Orchestre National de Lyon etc.
- Collaborations: Guide de la Mélodie (Fayard, 1994); Dictionnaire Berlioz (Fayard, 2003), Larousse de la Musique (Condé, Deutsch, Kagel, Massenet, Critique musicale), the Encyclopædia Universalis, the Grove Dictionary of Music and Musicians etc.

==== Recording notices ====
More than a hundred including:

- Ropartz, Requiem - Catherine Dubosc, soprano; Jacqueline Mayeur, mezzo-soprano; Vincent Le Texier, bass; François-Henri Houbart, organ; Ensemble instrumental Jean-Walter Audoli, dir. Michel Piquemal (1991, Adda 581266) OCLC 715517520
- Berlioz, La damnation de Faust - Philharmonia Orchestra, dir. Chung Myung-whun (April and May 1995 / June 1996, Deutsche Grammophon 453 500–2) OCLC 39722482
- Cécile Chaminade, Mots d'amour, mélodies - Anne Sofie von Otter, mezzo-soprano; Bengt Forsberg, piano (2001, DG) OCLC 49416634

==== Publisher ====
- Massenet, Mes Souvenirs (éd. Plume, 1992)
- Weber, La Vie d'un musicien et autres écrits series "Musiques et musiciens", Jean-Claude Lattès, 1986 OCLC 19356069 traduit de l'allemand (sous le nom de Lucienne Gérardin), présentation et notes par G. Condé.
- Berlioz, Cauchemars et passions, textes inédits (series "Musiques et musiciens", Jean-Claude Lattès, 1981)
- Charles Gounod; Gérard Condé (éd.) (2018). Charles Gounod, mémoires d'un artiste. Beaux Arts (in French). Arles/Venice: Actes Sud / Palazzetto Bru Zane / Symétrie. p. 362. ISBN 978-2-330-09280-1. OCLC 1023006152. — nouvelle édition présentée, annotée et complétée par G. Condé

Prefaces

- Berlioz, Les Grotesques de la musique, éd. Symétrie, 2014 OCLC 894404176
- Lettres de Charles Gounod à Pauline Viardot, éd. Symétrie, 2015 ISBN 978-2-330-03907-3
- Fanny Mendelssohn by Françoise Tillard, éd. Symétrie 2007 ISBN 2-914373-20-1
- Gustave Charpentieri et son temps by Michela Niccolai, éd. Université de Saint-Étienne, 2013 ISBN 978-2-86272-642-7

== Discography ==
- Premières mélodies du XXI: De barque à barque, poems by Yves Bonnefoy; Guillemette Laurens, mezzo-soprano; Maria Belooussova, piano (2005, Maguelone) OCLC 853002584
- mélodrames français by Caroline Gautier (Una corda)
- La Chouette enrhumée (PIC)
- Salima sac à ruses (Maguelone)
- Infusoires

== Bibliography ==
- Baker, Theodore; Slonimsky, Nicolas (1995). Dictionnaire biographique des musiciens (Baker's Biographical Dictionary of Musicians). Bouquins (in French). Vol. 1. Paris: Éditions Robert Laffont. p. 819. ISBN 2-221-06787-8. Baker1995..
- Vignal, Marc (2005). Dictionnaire de la musique (in French). Paris: Éditions Larousse. p. 249. ISBN 2-03-505545-8. OCLC 896013420. Vignal2005..
