= Huguette Tourangeau =

Canadian mezzo-soprano (1938–2018)

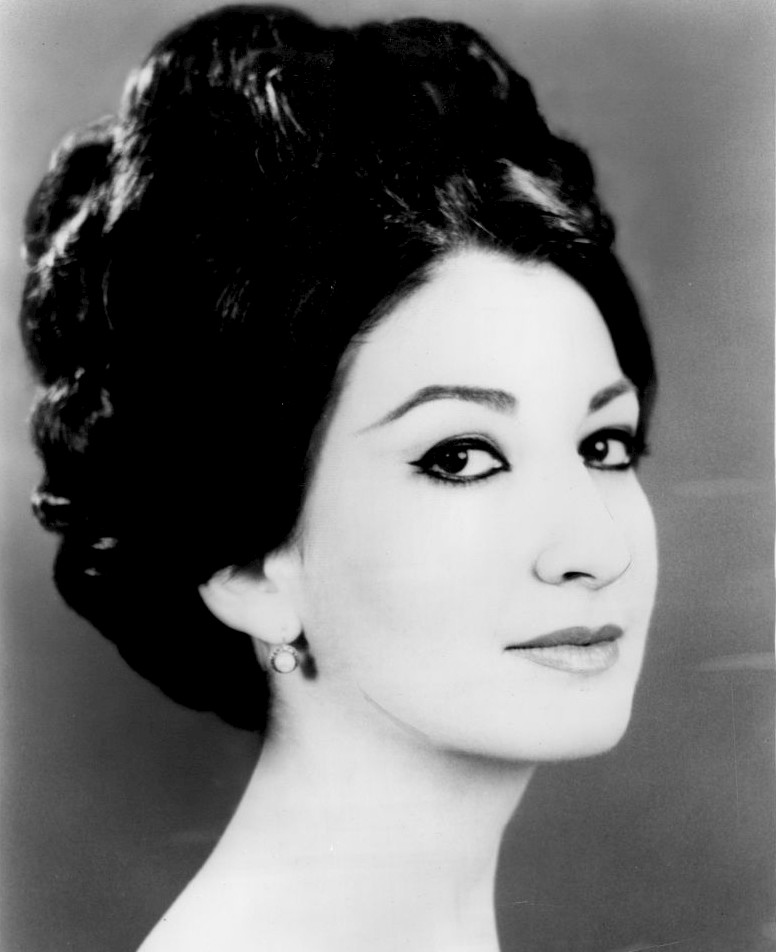
Tourangeau in 1970

Huguette Tourangeau, CM (August 12, 1938 – April 21, 2018) was a French-Canadian operatic mezzo-soprano, particularly associated with the French and Italian repertories.

== Life and career ==
Huguette Tourangeau was born in Montreal, Quebec, and graduated in pedagogy and piano from the Montreal Marguerite-Bourgeoys College, before entering the Conservatoire de musique du Québec à Montréal in 1958, where she was a pupil of Ruzena Herlinger (voice), Otto-Werner Mueller (repertory) and Roy Royal (declamation). In 1962, she was a soloist in Monteverdi's Vespro della Beata Vergine, in Montreal. She made her operatic debut as Mercédès in Carmen, under Zubin Mehta, in 1964, also in Montreal.

In 1964 Tourangeau won the Metropolitan Opera National Council Auditions. The same year, she sang Cherubino in The Marriage of Figaro at the Stratford Festival under Richard Bonynge. During the 1965–66 season, she appeared as Carmen in fifty-six cities throughout North America with the Metropolitan Opera National Company. Around that time, she began a partnership with Dame Joan Sutherland and Bonynge, both on stage and on record. She was heard in Seattle as Malika in Lakmé; London as Urbain in Les Huguenots; and San Francisco as Elisabetta in Maria Stuarda, Adalgisa in Norma, Parséīs in Esclarmonde, and Prince Orlofsky in Die Fledermaus.

In 1967 and 1968, Tourangeau appeared with the New York City Opera, as Carmen. She made her formal Metropolitan Opera debut on November 28, 1973, as Nicklausse in The Tales of Hoffmann (with Plácido Domingo in the titular role), and later sang Dorabella in Così fan tutte (1975–76), Cherubino in The Marriage of Figaro (opposite Justino Díaz and Judith Blegen, 1976) and Parséïs in Esclarmonde (opposite Sutherland, 1976).

Tourangeau appears in Christopher Nupen's 1973 film Carmen: the Dream and the Destiny, which documents a production of Carmen at the Hamburg State Opera (directed by Regina Resnik) in which Plácido Domingo plays Don José to her Carmen. In 1978, she was seen in the Met's televised performance of Don Giovanni, as Zerlina, which was her final role at that theatre. She last appeared in a staged opera in Lyon in 1980, in Werther.

Other notable roles included Bertarido in Rodelinda, at the Holland Festival; in Semiramide (as Arsace), Mignon (as Mignon), and Le roi de Lahore (as Kaled), at the Vancouver Opera; and La Grande-Duchesse de Gérolstein, at the Santa Fe Opera.

== Legacy ==
In 1977, Tourangeau became the first recipient of the "Canadian Music Council" artist of the year, and was appointed a Member of the Order of Canada in July 1997. Her husband, Barry Thompson (who died in 2009), was manager of the Vancouver Opera (1975–78) and of the Edmonton Opera Association.

== Death ==
Tourangeau died on April 21, 2018, aged 79.

== Recordings ==
Tourangeau sings in many recordings on Decca Records opposite Sutherland: Les Huguenots (1969), Messiah (1970), Rigoletto (1971), Lucia di Lammermoor (1971), Les contes d'Hoffmann (1971), Maria Stuarda (1975), L'oracolo (with Tito Gobbi, 1975), Esclarmonde (1975), Le roi de Lahore (with Luis Lima, 1979), and Rodelinda (as Unulfo, 1985). She also recorded Thérèse (with Louis Quilico, 1974) and El amor brujo (with the Montreal Symphony Orchestra, 1981) and made two recital discs: "Arias from Forgotten Operas" (1970) and art songs by Massenet (with Bonynge at the piano, 1975).

== Videography ==
- Delibes: Lakmé (Sutherland; Bonynge, Ayrton, 1976) [live] Kultur

== Sources ==
- The Canadian Music Encyclopedia, Gilles Potvin.
