= Esclarmonde =

Opera by Jules Massenet

- opéra romanesque by Jules Massenet
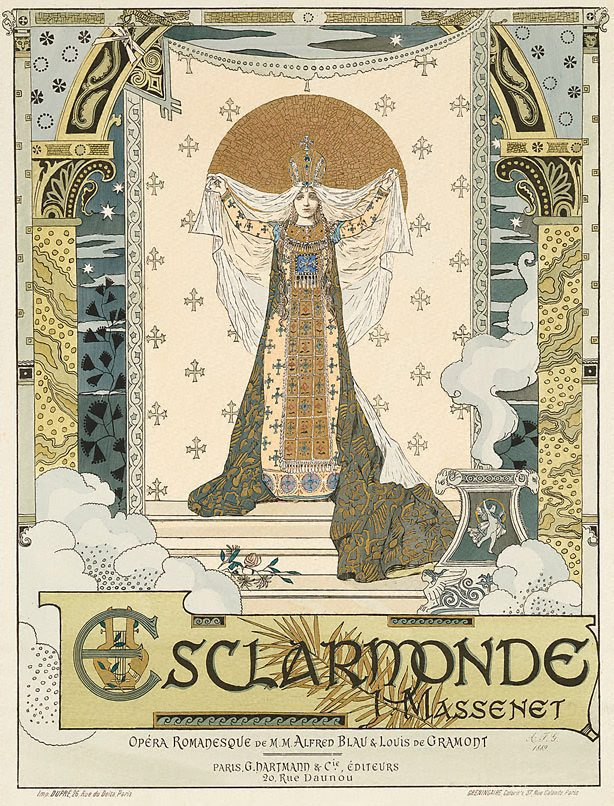
- Original poster for the premiere
- Librettist: Alfred Blau; Louis Ferdinand de Gramont
- Language: French
- Based on: medieval chivalric tale Parthénopéus de Blois
- Premiere: 15 May 1889; Théâtre Lyrique, Paris

Esclarmonde (French pronunciation: [ɛsklaʁmɔ̃d]) is an opéra (French: opéra romanesque) in four acts and eight tableaux, with prologue and epilogue, by Jules Massenet, to a French libretto by Alfred Blau and Louis Ferdinand de Gramont. It was first performed at the Exposition Universelle on 15 May 1889 by the Opéra-Comique at the Théâtre Lyrique on the Place du Châtelet in Paris.

Esclarmonde is perhaps Massenet's most ambitious work for the stage and is his most Wagnerian in style and scope. (Note: To describe it as Wagnerian is a little overstatement. Leitmotivs are clear and distinct, "Wagner-like", but beyond some melodic or harmonic resemblance to ones used by Wagner (particularly in his Tristan und Isolde, Das Rheingold, or Götterdämmerung), they are nevertheless very original. Unlike in Wagner, and in so many other composers, there is no tragedy, death or self-sacrifice involved.) In orchestral coloring and structure of melody, however, it follows French traditions. The opera has been revived sporadically in the modern era, most notably during the 1970s with Joan Sutherland, conducted by Massenet champion Richard Bonynge. The role of Esclarmonde is notoriously difficult to sing, with challenging stratospheric coloratura passages.

== Background ==
The story of the opera is based on the medieval chivalric tale Parthénopéus de Blois, which was written in the middle of the 12th century by Denis Pyramus. In the original tale, however, the protagonist sorceress is called "Melior"; Esclarmonde's name was borrowed from another chanson de geste of the 13th century: Huon de Bordeaux. Although the Esclarmonde who appears in Huon is completely different from her operatic counterpart, Huon clearly served as the basis of at least part of the opera's libretto. Alfred Blau discovered Parthénopéus in 1871 in the library of Blois, where he took refuge during the time of the Paris Commune. The libretto was originally called Pertinax; it was first drafted in prose and later versified by Blau's collaborator, Louis de Gramont. In that form – a romantic melodrama in five acts – it was offered in 1882 to the Belgian composer François-Auguste Gevaert, who, however, declined to set it. Soon the libretto found its way into Massenet's hands, though the precise circumstances in which this occurred remain a mystery.

On 1 August 1886, Massenet and his publisher Georges Hartmann attended a performance of Parsifal at the Bayreuth Festival, an event which deeply impressed the composer and had a significant influence on his music. He had already seen the entire Ring cycle when it was produced in Brussels in 1883.

In his Memoirs, which were compiled in 1911 near the end of his life, Massenet ascribes the creation of the role of Esclarmonde to a chance meeting with Sibyl Sanderson sometime in the spring of 1887. He recounts how he was astonished by the range and capacity of her voice, realizing at once that she was the perfect choice for the heroine of his new opera, which he had begun to compose at the end of 1886. It is almost certain, however, that he had received the libretto to Esclarmonde much earlier than that, and the meeting with Sybil Sanderson served rather as an additional catalyst – a stimulus to complete the opera. The work was commissioned as a spectacular event to open the Paris Exposition of 1889. During the most intensive period of creation in the summer of 1887, Massenet moved into the Grand Hotel in Vevey, where Miss Sanderson was also staying; there he rehearsed with her each evening the various sections of his new opera as he composed them. The opera was completed by the end of 1888, and stage rehearsals started at Opéra-Comique. Massenet dedicated the work to Sybil Sanderson in gratitude, allowing her signature to stand alongside his own in the manuscript of the score. Rodney Milnes suggests that Massenet's "passion for his leading lady resulted in some of his most chromatically tortuous erotic writing" while observing that the operatic events are "dispatched in just over two hours of music". Crichton notes also the skill of Massenet in writing for male voices - both the tenors Roland and Énéas, but also for the Bishop, the Emperor Phorcas and the King. He also points to the scoring of low instruments, where the bass clarinet and tuba show "an individual application of lessons well learned from the later parts of The Ring, used with a discretion unlikely to upset the general public of the day".

Seven black and white projections for the scenes of sorcery, using the magic lantern technology, were created by Eugène Grasset, who also illustrated the original vocal score.

After a very successful initial run, however, the opera disappeared from the repertoire and fell into almost complete oblivion. Soon afterwards Sybil Sanderson fell ill. When she died around the start of the 20th century, it seems that Massenet himself lost interest in the opera he had written for her and he discouraged any further productions. The work was not revived until 1923, well after the composer's death. Some short-lived revivals then followed, either staged or in concert performance. It was only in the 1970s that the efforts of Richard Bonynge and Joan Sutherland brought Esclarmonde back to life. Since then the work has been performed more frequently.

== Performance history ==
Listing below are partially based on (extracted from) Casaglia, Gherardo (2005)."Esclarmonde". L'Almanacco di Gherardo Casaglia (in Italian).

- 17 December 1888 – the first (stage) rehearsal of Esclarmonde by the Opéra-Comique company (at the Salle du Châtelet, Ancien Théâtre-Lyrique des Nations de la Comédie-Italienne) in Paris.
- 13 May 1889 – the final (dress) rehearsal of Esclarmonde.
- 15 May 1889 – the world premiere (9th day after inauguration of l'Exposition Universelle (1889)) under the stage direction of Charles-Auguste–Marie Ponchard, choreography by Louise Marquet, scenography and design by Antoine Lavastre, Eugène Carpezat, Amable Petit and Eugène-Benoît Gardy. Sibyl Sanderson performed the title role in her professional debut.; with Parséis, her sister (Miss Nardi), the knight Roland (Étienne Gibert), Emperor Phorcas (Émile-Alexandre Taskin), the Bishop of Blois (Max Bouvet), Aeneas, a Byzantine knight, Parséis's fiancé (Herbert), Cléomer, King of France (Boudouresque), orchestra conducted by Jules Danbé. The original costumes were by Charles Bianchini.
- 10 September 1889 – 50th performance of Esclarmonde at the Opéra-Comique (cast the same as the premiere).
- 27 November 1889 – premiere of Esclarmonde at the Théâtre Royal de la Monnaie in Brussels – conductor Joseph Dupont, Marguerite Zinah (Esclarmonde), Émilie Durand-Ulbach (Parséis), Guillaume Ibos (Roland), Paul Isouard (Énéas), Max Bouvet (Bishop of Blois), Mr. Challet (Cléomer), Mr. Sentein (Phorcas). 20 more performances followed.
- 10 January 1890 – premiere of Ex-Clarmonde at the Théâtre de l'Alcazar in Brussels. This folie-parodie by Luc Malpertuis and George Garnir had musical arrangements and new ballet music by Georges Nazy. It was the first production to feature stage sets by the prolific Albert Dubosq.
- 6 February 1890 – 100th performance of Esclarmonde at the Opéra-Comique (cast as at the premiere). Before the end of that season the number had reached 110, Sanderson singing in all of them.

Within the next few years performances in France took place in Bordeaux (with Mme. Georgette Bréjean-Silver aka Bréjean-Graviére), and Lyon (with Alice Verlet, and Mlle. Marie Vuillaume).

- 16 January 1892 – premiere of Esclarmonde in Saint Petersburg (at the Hermitage Theater at the Winter Palace), the main cast (including Sanderson) exactly as from the Paris premiere, sung in French. The next few years, however, in Saint Petersburg, Esclarmonde was presented also at Mariinsky Theater, sung in Russian, singers including Eduard Krushevsky, and tenors Ivan Yershov and Mikhail Mikhaylov who shared the role of Roland).
- 10 February 1893 – The U.S. premiere at the French Opera House, in New Orleans. Sanderson sang the title role there also.
- 13 December 1893 – production at the Théâtre des Arts in Rouen, France. Mme. Priollaud sang the title role.
- 30 January 1897 – premiere of Esclarmonde at the Grand Théâtre de Geneva, Switzerland.
- 24 December 1923 – first performance of Esclarmonde at the Théâtre de l'Opéra (Palais Garnier) in Paris. Philippe Gaubert (conductor); Pierre Chéreau (direction); C. Brooke (choreography); Paul Paquereau, Simas and Alexandre Bailly (scenography and design); Fanny Heldy (Esclarmonde), Yvonne Courso (Parséis), Paul Franz (Roland), Gaston Dubois (Énéas), Jean-François Delmas (Phorcas), Édouard Roux (Bishop of Blois), Albert Huberty (Cléomer).
- 6 February 1924 – production at the Théâtre Municipal in Strasbourg, France.
- 11 November 1931 – revival of Esclarmonde at the Palais Garnier in Paris. François Ruhlmann (conductor), Pierre Chéreau (direction), Albert Aveline (choreography), Gabrielle Ritter-Ciampi (Esclarmonde), Jeanne Manceau (Parséis), Georges Thill (Roland), Henri Le Clezio (Énéas), John Brownlee (Bishop of Blois), Albert Huberty (Phorcas), Grommen (Cléomer).
- 2 June 1934 – 27th performance of Esclarmonde at the Palais Garnier in Paris. Ruhlmann (conducting), Chéreau (direction), Gabrielle Ritter-Ciampi (Esclarmonde), Odette Ricquier (Parséis), Georges Thill (Roland), Henri Le Clezio (Énéas), Martial Singher (Bishop of Blois), Albert Huberty (Phorcas), Armand Narçon (Cléomer).
- 4 June 1942 – concert performance of the 3rd tableau of Esclarmonde at the Paris Opéra during a "Massenet Gala", after part of his oratorio La Vierge; Ruhlmann conducted, Elen Dosia sang Esclarmonde with Charles Fronval as Roland.
- 1 January 1944 – revival of Esclarmonde at the Théâtre La Monnaie, Brussels, with six performances given: Clara Clairbert (Esclarmonde), Livine Mertens (Parséis), José Lens (Roland), Francis Barthel (Énéas), Emile Colonne (Bishop of Blois), Maurice De Groote (Cléomer), Albert Mancel (Phorcas).
- 19 November 1963 – radio broadcast of the full opera in Paris for RTF (Radiodiffusion-Télévision Française). Gustave Cloëz (conducting), Jacqueline Brumaire (Esclarmonde), Janine Capderou (Parséis), Henri Legay (Roland).
- 23 October 1974 – first performance at the War Memorial Opera House (San Francisco), continuing into October and November (8th broadcast live). Production by Lotfi Mansouri, scenery and design by Beni Montresor, choreography by Norbert Vasek. All cast in debut role: Richard Bonynge conducting, Joan Sutherland (Esclarmonde), Giacomo Aragall (Roland), Huguette Tourangeau (Parséis), William Harness (Énéas), Clifford Grant (Phorcas), Robert Kerns (Bishop of Blois), Philip Booth (Cléomer).
- 19 November 1976 – San Francisco production mounted at the Metropolitan Opera, with nine further performances in November and December, live broadcast on December 11. Richard Bonynge (conducting), Joan Sutherland (Esclarmonde), Huguette Tourangeau (Parséis), Giacomo Aragall (Roland), John Carpenter (Énéas), Louis Quilico (Bishop of Blois), Clifford Grant (Phorcas), John Macurdy (Cléomer).
- 28 November 1983 – first performance at the Royal Opera House Covent Garden, London, followed by four more performances. Production by Lotfi Mansouri, Beni Montresor (set design, costumes and lighting), Terry Gilbert (choreography), Richard Bonynge (conducting), Joan Sutherland (Esclarmonde), Ernesto Veronelli (Roland), Diana Montague (Parséïs), Ryland Davies (Énéas), Gwynne Howell (Phorcas), Jonathan Summers (Bishop of Blois).
- October and November 1992 – mounted at the Massenet Festival in Saint-Étienne; Denia Gavazzeni-Mazzola and Anna-Maria Gonzales shared the title role, Luca Lombardo and José Sempere that of Roland; Patrick Fournillier conducted. The production was then seen at the Opéra-Comique on November 18.
- 17 November 1992 – the Italian premiere at the Nuovo Teatro Regio di Torino. Lorenzo Mariani (direction), Pasquale Grossi (scenery and design), Tiziana Tosco (choreography), Alain Guingal (conducting); Alexandrina Pendatchanska (Esclarmonde), Claudia Nicole Bandera (Parséïs), Alberto Cupido (Roland), Ivan Kiurkciev (Enéas), Michele Pertusi (Phorcas), Manrico Biscotti (Bishop of Blois), Boris Martinovich (Cléomer). A second cast took over on 28 November.
- 7 January 1993 – mounted at the Teatro Massimo di Palermo with seven further performances, with Denia Mazzola Gavazzeni (Esclarmonde) (Rosella Redoglia sang the title role on January 24), Elena Zilio (Parséïs), Pietro Ballo (Roland), Jean-Philippe Courtis (Phorcas), Tom Fox (Bishop of Blois), Salvatore Ragonese (Enéas), (Bonaldo Giaiotti (Cléomer), directed by Jean-Louis Pichon, conducted by Gianandrea Gavazzeni.
- 6 June 1998 – concert performance by the Chelsea Opera Group, at the Queen Elizabeth Hall, London. Raphaëlle Farman (Esclarmonde), Harriet Williams (Parséïs), Justin Lavender (Roland), Jeremy White (Phorcas), Roberto Salvatori (Bishop of Blois), Richard Robson (Cléomer), Stephen Rooke (Enéas); Christopher Fifield (Chorus Master), conducted by Howard Williams.
- 8 April 2005 – Washington Concert Opera performance. Celena Shafer (Esclarmonde), Gigi Mitchell-Velasco (Parséis), Robert Breault (Roland), Dean Peterson (Phorcas), Robert Gardner (Bishop of Blois), François Loup (Cléomer), Antony Walker conducting; in Lisner Auditorium of the George Washington University.
- 26 May 2013, German premiere at Dessau, conducted by Daniel Carlberg in a production by Roman Hovenbitzer and Angelina Ruzzafante in the title role.

== Roles ==
Role	Voice type	Premiere Cast, May 15, 1889 (Conductor: Jules Danbé)
Esclarmonde, (Note: Upton describes one of Esclarmonde's arias in the third act as "extremely brilliant and difficult, making exacting demands upon the voice." In Act 3, for instance, are some numerous moments requiring voice range, as written, from the middle C up to top G (over top C). Even though Massenet himself allowed some "scale down" on the highest note used (from G6 to "only" E♭6), still it is higher than average soprano can go. Moreover, long lasting legato, jumps from high register to the low (with full dynamic range), trills and staccato on high notes, make all that role unusually difficult and taxing for average soprano to sing.) daughter of the Emperor	soprano	Sibyl Sanderson
Parséїs, her sister	mezzo-soprano	Jeanne Nardi
Roland, Count of Blois	tenor	Étienne Gibert
Énéas, Byzantine knight, fiancé of Parséїs	tenor	Gustave Prosper Herbert
The Bishop of Blois	baritone	Max Bouvet
Phorcas, Emperor of Byzantium, father of Esclarmonde and Parséїs	bass-baritone	Émile-Alexandre Taskin
Cléomer, King of France	baritone	Auguste-Acanthe Boudouresque
Saracen envoy	tenor	Étienne Troy
Byzantine herald	tenor	Pierre Cornubert (1863-1922)
Nobles, Knights, Guards, Monks, Priests and Penitents, Warriors, Virgins, Children, Spirits, Courtiers, Populace; (Ballet) Spirits of forest, water, fire and air, Nymphs.

== Synopsis ==
The story is based on a medieval legend and revolves around Esclarmonde, an empress and sorceress of Byzantium. Sequestered by her emperor father, Phorcas, who has recently abdicated the throne to her, she bemoans her love for Roland, a knight and Count of Blois, believing she will never be allowed to be with him. Following a suggestion from her sister, Parséïs, Esclarmonde uses her magic powers to transfer Roland to the magic island where she joins him and continues to do so on a nightly basis and, hiding behind a veil, never reveals her identity. She reveals to him also that his country is in danger, attacked and besieged by the Saracens, and grants him a magic sword with which he will be capable of defeating the enemy. It will serve him well as long as he remains faithful to her.

Roland then goes to help the besieged Blois and wins the battle with the leader of the Saracens. In reward, he is granted by the king of France the hand of his royal daughter. But Roland refuses to accept that offer, not disclosing the reason. When he finally confesses his nightly tryst to the Bishop of Blois, the bishop and a group of monks intervene on Esclarmonde's arrival, performing an exorcism and in a crucial moment manage to tear off her veil and thus reveal her identity. Feeling betrayed, Esclarmonde, in her bravura aria O Roland, tu m'as trahie, et me voilà... Regarde-les ces yeux, rebukes Roland for his faithlessness. The confrontation scene proceeds with Roland trying at the last moment to use his sword to defend her from the monks. Suddenly, the magic sword shatters to pieces, and Esclarmonde, surrounding herself with a ring of fire and demons, curses Roland and disappears.

The ex-emperor, Phorcas, upon hearing of Esclarmonde's disobedience, summons her to him and insists she renounce Roland. He threatens to remove her magic powers and to execute Roland. Reluctantly, she submits and when Roland is brought before her she implores him to forget her. A tournament takes place to award the victor with Esclarmonde's hand in marriage. When the winner, clad all in black, is asked his name, he replies "despair", and refuses the hand of Esclarmonde. Esclarmonde recognizes the voice immediately, however, as that of Roland, and when her veil is lifted he recognizes her as well and all hail the new empress and her valiant consort.

== Recordings ==
A studio recording by Decca was made on 2–15 July 1975 at the Kingsway Hall, London, with Joan Sutherland (Esclarmonde), Huguette Tourangeau (Parséis), Clifford Grant (Phorcas), Giacomo Aragall (Roland), Louis Quilico (The Bishop of Blois), Ryland Davies (Enéas), Robert Lloyd (Cléomer), Finchley Children's Music Group, John Alldis Choir, National Philharmonic Orchestra, cond. Richard Bonynge. Decca. 475-7914 (3 CDs). ADD STEREO STUDIO.

In addition, recordings of live performances have been made available:

- Joan Sutherland, Huguette Tourangeau, Clifford Grant, Giacomo Aragall, William Harness (Enéas), Philip Booth (Cléomer), Robert Kerns (The Bishop of Blois), Gary Burgess (Saracen Envoy, Byzantine Herald), War Memorial Opera House Orchestra and Chorus, cond. Richard Bonynge, November 8, 1974, live broadcast. Living Stage. 1110 (2CDs), MONO (quasi-stereo).
- Joan Sutherland, Huguette Tourangeau, Clifford Grant, Giacomo Aragall, Louis Quilico, cond. Richard Bonynge, December 11, 1976 (Metropolitan Opera radio broadcast) available from the MetOpera radio during periodical re-broadcasts on Sirius Radio, or "music on demand" at Rhapsody, or by subscription within the Met-player (TT: 147'22").
- Joan Sutherland, Diana Montague (Parséis), Gwynne Howell (Phorcas), Ernesto Veronelli (Roland), Jonathan Summers (The Bishop of Blois), Geoffrey Moses (Cléomer), Ryland Davies, Royal Opera Covent Garden Chorus and Orchestra, cond. Richard Bonynge, November 28, 1983), live in-house recording. Available as the web stream at Opera Today archives (TT: 142'55")
- Alexandrina Pendatchanska (Esclarmonde), Claudia Nicole Bandera (Parséis), Alberto Cupido (Roland), Michele Pertusi (Phorcas), Manrico Biscotti (The Bishop of Blois), Teatro Regio di Torino, cond. Alain Guingal (November/December 1992), Charles Handelman VHS Video Cassette – Live Opera 09122, NTSC, 2002. (TT: 158'00")
- Denia Mazzola-Gavazzeni (Esclarmonde), Hélène Perraguin (Parséis), José Sempere (Roland), Jean-Philippe Courtis (Phorcas and Cléomer); Christian Tréguier; Guy Gabelle. Choeurs du Festival Massenet, Orchestre Symphonique Franz Liszt, Budapest, cond. Patrick Fournillier. Live recording in October/November 1992 at the Massenet Festival in Saint Étienne. Koch-Swann, released 1994, DDD, 3-1269-2 H1 (TT: 156'31", 3 CDs).

In 1920 Maria Kousnezoff recorded "Regarde-les, ces yeux" (Act 3) with orchestra, on Pathé saphir 80t 2024.

== Instrumentation ==
- Woodwinds: 3 flutes (incl. also piccolo), 3 oboes (incl. also English horn), 3 clarinets (incl. also bass clarinet), 3 bassoons (incl. also double bassoon)
- Brass: 4 French horns, 3 trumpets, 3 trombones, tuba, saxtuba
- Timpani, percussion (incl. snare drum, triangle, tamtam, glockenspiel, crash cymbals, orchestral bass drum)
- Organ
- Strings, 2 harps
- Mixed Choir, children's choir
