= Eugène Carpezat =

French scenographer

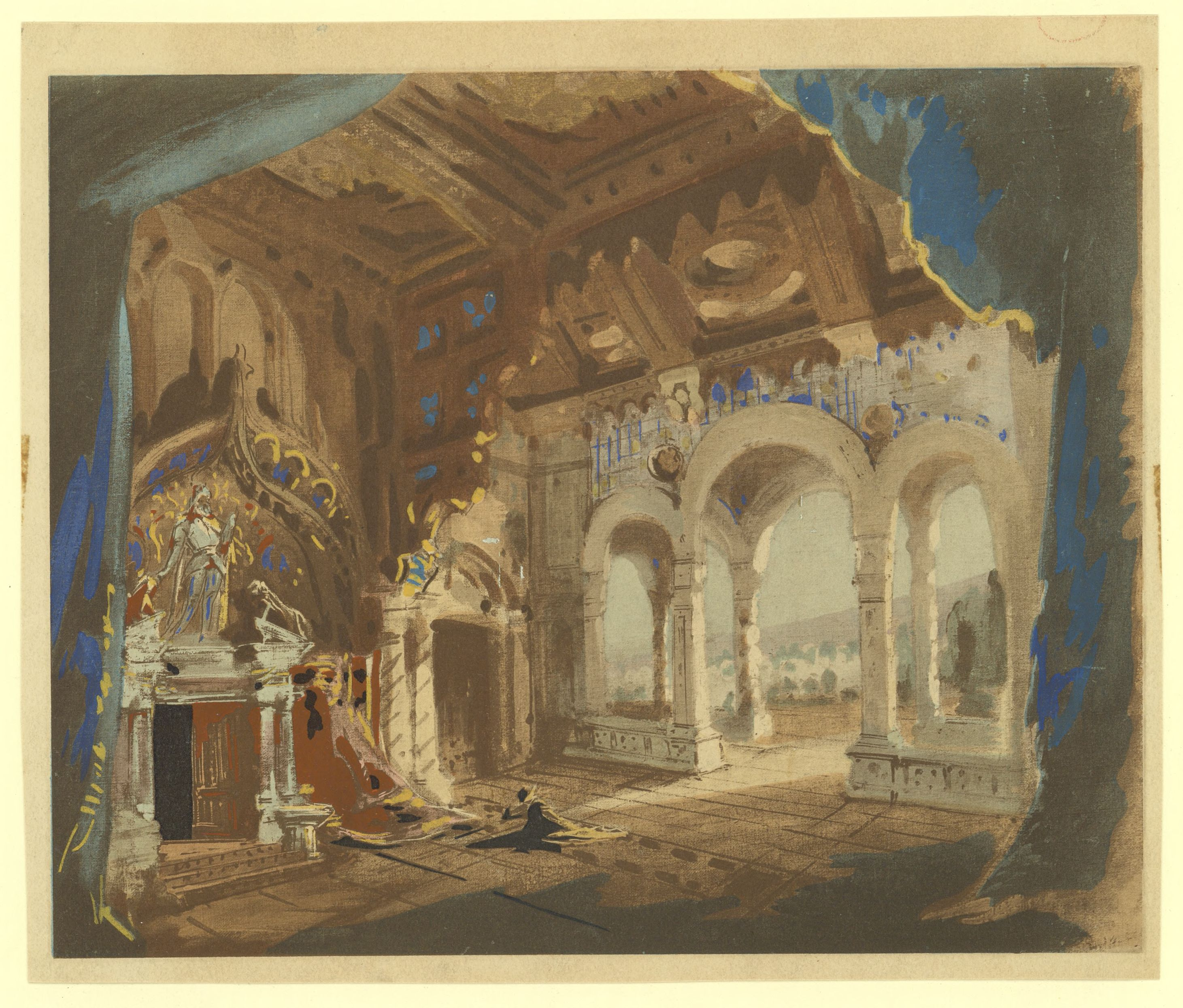
Set design for Paul and Lucien Hillemacher's Orsola (1902)

Eugène Louis Carpezat (Paris, 4 November 1833 – Paris, 26 February 1912) was an acclaimed French scenographer in the Belle Époque.

== Career ==
Carpezat was the son of lemonade makers Claude François Carpezat and Jacqueline Caniou. After considering a career in the fine and decorative arts (e.g., Sabre d'honneur designed with Henry Hayez, 1857; the sculpture Enfants sur un bouc, Trouville, 1866), he studied with the famous scenic designer Charles-Antoine Cambon, a specialist in architectural sets.

In 1875, Carpezat set up a professional association with fellow scenographer (Joseph-)Antoine Lavastre in order to take over Cambon's workshop at the latter's death. Together, Carpezat and Lavastre designed some of the defining Parisian productions – or parts thereof, as was customary – of the late 1870s and early 1880s: the world premieres of Delibes' Lakmé (1883), Gounod's Polyeucte (1878) and Le Tribut de Zamora (1881), Massenet's Le Roi de Lahore (1877), Saint-Saëns' Henri VIII (1883), Verdi's Aida (Opéra premiere, 1880), and the theatrical adaptation of Verne's Michel Strogoff (1880). The duo also designed a number of revival productions for the Parisian Opéra, the scenery of which had perished in the fire of the Salle Le Peletier (1873) – Meyerbeer's Robert le Diable (1876), L'Africaine (1877) and Le Prophète (1883). Also by Carpezat and Lavastre l'aîné were the interior decorations of the Opera-Comique's second Salle Favart (1879).

Upon Lavastre's death, in 1883, Carpezat briefly joined hands with Lavastre's younger brother, Jean-Baptiste, to design the premieres of, among others, Bruneau's Le Rêve (1891), Massenet's Esclarmonde (1889) and Le Mage (1891), and Saint-Saëns' Ascanio (1890). Carpezat worked independently from Lavastre's death (1891) onwards. Named the latter's successor as the Opéra's chef du service des décorations, Carpezat contributed to an immense number of stagings at the Palais Garnier: Gluck's Armide (1905), Gounod's Sapho (new production, 1884) and Faust (complete redesign, 1908), Leroux' Astarté (premiere, 1901), Massenet's Le Cid (world premiere, 1885) and Thaïs (world premiere, 1894), Rameau's Hippolyte et Aricie (modern premiere, 1908), Reyer's Salammbô (Parisian premiere, 1892), Rossini's Guillaume Tell (new production, 1899), Saint-Saëns' Samson et Dalila (Parisian premiere, 1892) and Henri VIII (new production, 1909), Verdi's Otello (Parisian premiere, 1894), and Wagner's Die Walküre (Parisian premiere, as La Valkyrie, 1893), Tannhäuser (new production, 1895) and Götterdämmerung (Opéra premiere, as Le Crépuscule des dieux, 1908). Carpezat also became a household name at the Comédie-Française (e.g., Sardou's Thermidor, 1891), Théâtre du Châtelet, Gaîté (Massenet's Hérodiade, 1903), Opéra-Comique (Delibes' Lakmé, 1898; Gounod's Mireille, 1901; Lalo's Le Roi d'Ys, 1888; Massenet's Manon, 1884 and 1898, Cendrillon, 1899 and Werther, 1903), Théâtre des Nations, Porte Saint-Martin (Sardou's Fédora, 1882 and Théodora, 1884, both starring Sarah Bernhardt; Rostand's Cyrano de Bergerac, 1897), and Variétés.

Carpezat also accepted commissions abroad, for instance from Madrid's Zarzuela and Belém's Theatro da Paz.

Carpezat received a diplôme d'honneur at the Exposition Universelle of 1878. He was awarded a grand prix and named Chevalier de la Légion d'honneur at the Exposition Universelle of 1889. He sat in the commission organizing the conference L'art théâtral at the Exposition Universelle of 1900. Numerous scenic designers of note were taught by Carpezat at his workshop at 50 Boulevard de la Villette: Ambroise Belluot, Léon Bouchet, François Carpezat (his son and successor), Demoget, Albert Dubosq, Oleguer Junyent i Sans, Lucien Jusseaume, Olivier Maréchal, Mouveau, Eugène Martial Simas and Victor Lamorte. Carpezat died at the age of 79, reportedly "aged, sad and discouraged due to no longer having any commissions from the larger theatres". He was interred in his family tomb at Montparnasse Cemetery.

== Style ==
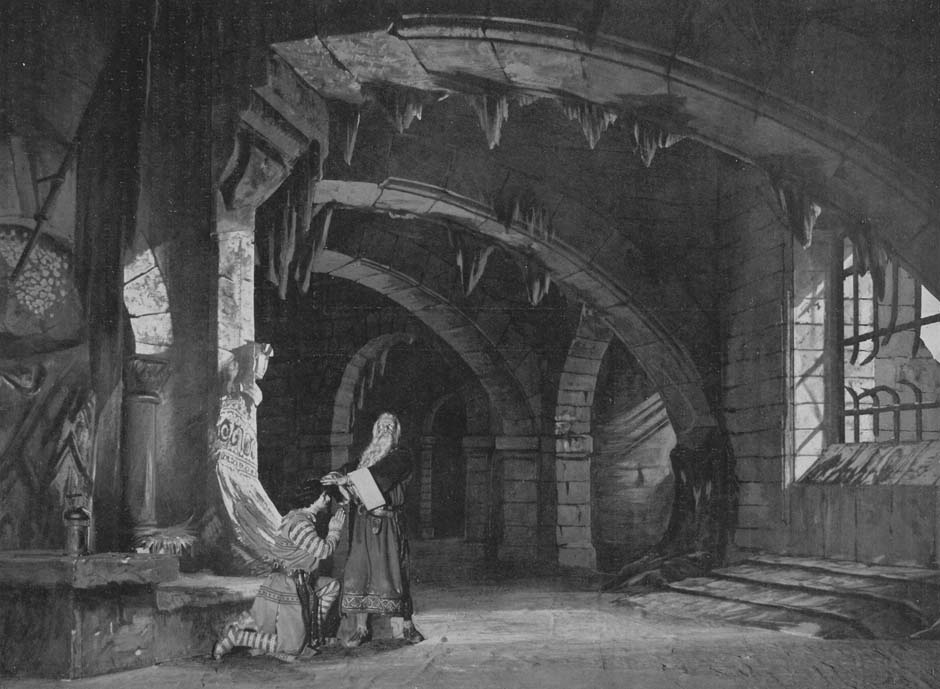
Carpezat's set for Hugo's Les Burgraves (1902), Act III. Photograph by Henri Mairet in Le théâtre.

As Le Gaulois wrote in 1912, Carpezat “faisait de la peinture qui avait de la tendance à l’impressionnisme; il procédait par larges coups de brosses, à grands traits ...” Posterity has been less kind to the man and, by extension, the last generation of Parisian romantic scenographers. In 1975, Donald Oenslager noted that,

In practicing their craft, they [Carpezat and contemporary scenic artists] carried on the established formulas and procedures of earlier ateliers. But they became powerful leaders who, perhaps without realizing it, initiated the industrialization of the scenic artists’ profession. The traditional old-time atelier became a business house. … With the growing pressures of expansion, something had gone out of the individual scenic artist such as Carpezat. He had lost himself in imitating former innovations, and in his expanding workshop, while satisfying the demand for popular illusionist techniques, he fell into the trap of scenic cliché and pictorial pastiche.

While Carpezat continued older traditions and techniques that he and his predecessors had been accumulating since the pioneering works of Pierre-Luc-Charles Ciceri – who had taught Carpezat's own master, Cambon – he made an idiosyncratic contribution to the art of scenic painting. For instance, while Cambon had mainly used greyish tones, Carpezat painted his scenery in crisp, luminous colors that benefited from electric lighting and catered to the taste of the Belle Époque, and more particularly to contemporary vogues such as the art nouveau (think of Alphonse Mucha), period furniture, and Beaux-Arts architecture. In addition, Carpezat was second to none in conjuring up the illusion of solid, protruding volumes from painted flats. Less interested in depicting historicist ornaments than his colleagues (e.g., Amable), he sought to amplify the dramatic potential of each setting by focusing on perspective as a carrier of dramatic appeal. Quite significant in this respect are the changing proportional relationships between actor and painted surroundings Carpeza applied throughout his oeuvre.

== Preserved works ==
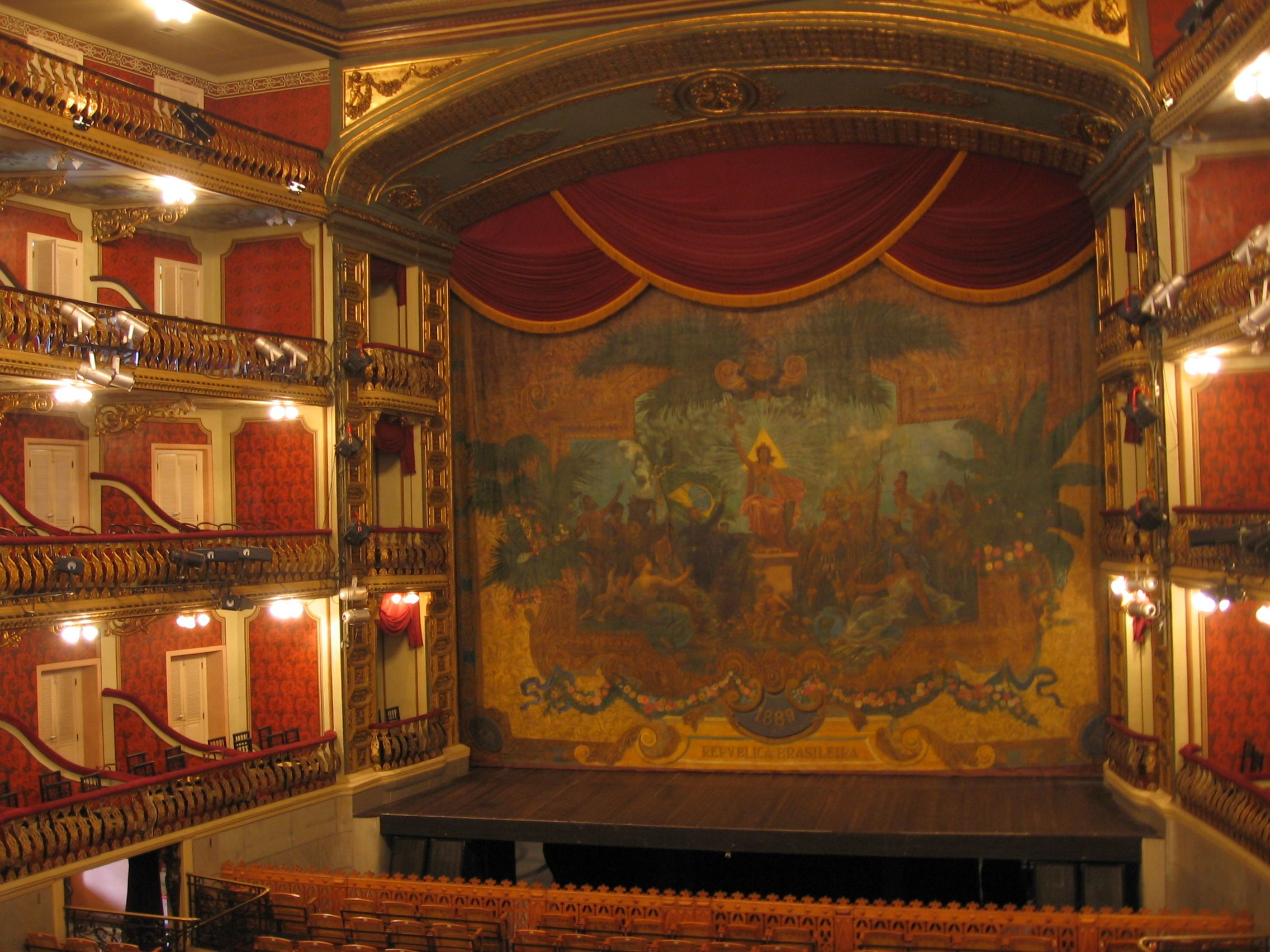
Carpezat's preserved stage curtain of the Theatro da Paz in Belém (Brazil), 1889.

Because Carpezat worked mainly on an independent, commercial basis, relatively few of his original set designs and scale-models have come down to us. For instance, all maquettes by Carpezat for the Théâtre de l'Opéra are preserved at the Bibliothèque-Musée de l'Opéra; by contrast, virtually no materials testify to Carpezat's rich activity at other venues in and outside France. Still, numerous photographs of Carpezat's works are available in illustrated periodicals such as Le théâtre, L'Art du théâtre, and Comœdia illustré, while a large-scale artifact of Carpezat's oeuvre survives in the guise of a painted act drop at the Theatro da Paz in Belém.

== Bibliography ==
- Germain Bapst, Essai sur l’histoire du théâtre: la mise en scène, le décor, le costume, l’architecture, l’éclairage, l’hygiène (Paris: Hachette, 1893), 617–618.
- Silvio D'Amico and Francesco Savio, eds., Enciclopedia dello spettacolo (Rome: Le Maschere, 1954–68), III, 94.
- Bruno Forment, Zwanenzang van een illusie: de historische toneeldecors van de Schouwburg Kortrijk (Kortrijk: Koninklijke Geschied- en Oudheidkundige Kring Kortrijk, 2015), 13–14.
- Pauline Girard, ‘L’évolution stylistique des décors à l'Opéra de Paris de 1863 à 1907’, in L’envers du décor à la Comédie-Française et à l’Opéra de Paris au XIXe siècle, ed. Catherine Join-Diéterle et al. (Montreuil: Gourcuff Gradenigo, 2012), 156–167.
- Arthur Pougin, ‘Décors et décorateurs’, Revue d’art dramatique 33 (1894), 65-84: 80.
- Various Authors, L’art théâtral. Congrès international de 1900 tenu à l’Exposition universelle au Palais des Congrès du 27 au 31 juillet 1900 (Paris: Pariset, 1901).
- Nicole Wild, Décors et costumes du XIXe siècle. Tome II: théâtres et décorateurs (Paris: Bibliothèque nationale de France-Département de la Musique, 1993), 291.
