= Panurge (opera) =

Opera by Jules Massenet

- Haulte farce musicale by Jules Massenet
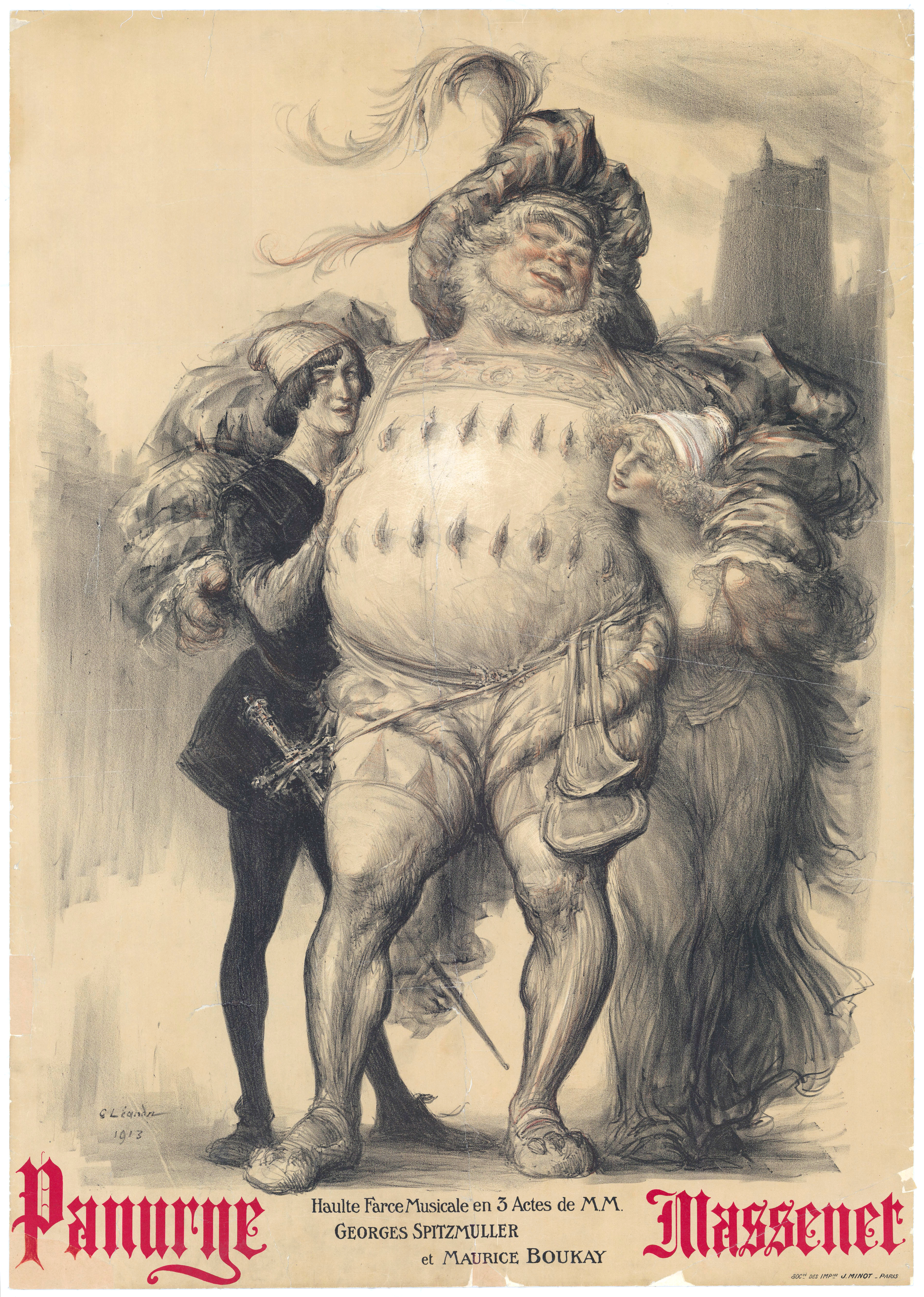
- Poster for the premiere
- Librettist: Georges Spitzmuller; Maurice Boukay
- Language: French
- Based on: Pantagruel by Rabelais
- Premiere: 25 April 1913; Théâtre de la Gaîté, Paris

Panurge is an opera (titled 'Haulte farce musicale') in three acts by Jules Massenet to a French libretto by Georges Spitzmuller and Maurice Boukay, after Pantagruel by Rabelais. It was first performed at the Théâtre de la Gaîté in Paris on 25 April 1913, nearly a year after Massenet's death, one of three operas by the composer to have premiered posthumously, the others being Cléopâtre (1914) and Amadis (1922).

== Performance history ==
It is one of Massenet's least known operas, but was revived at the Massenet Festival in St. Etienne in 1994 under conductor Patrick Fournillier. Harding quotes a reaction of Alfred Bruneau who declared that the libretto was not suited to Massenet's temperament and demanded music not of a Massenet, but of a Chabrier.

== Roles ==
Role	Voice type	Premiere Cast, 25 April 1913 (Conductor: A. Amalou)
Pantagruel	bass or baritone	Giovanni Martinelli, tenor
Panurge	basso cantante	Vanni Marcoux
Ribaude, Thélémite	soprano	Zina Brozia
Brother Jean des Entommeurs, abbot of Thélème	leggero tenor	Dinh Gilly, baritone
Colombe, wife of Panurge	mezzo-soprano	Lucy Arbell
Queen Baguenaude of the Lanternois	soprano	Maïna Doria
Angoulevent, "prince des sotz"	baritone	Éric Audoin
Alcofibras, inn-keeper	baritone	Walter Alberti
Gringoire, disguised as "mère sotte"	leggero tenor	Raveau
Brid'oye, jurist	tenor buffo	Delgal
Rondilibis, doctor	tenor buffo	Godet
Trouillogan, philosopher	baritone	Lacombe
Raminagrobis, poet	baritone	Joseph Royer
Gymnaste, squire of Pantagruel	baritone	Henri Marchand
Malcorne, squire of Pantagruel	baritone	Garrus
Carpalin, squire of Pantagruel	baritone	Desrais
Épistémon, squire of Pantagruel	baritone	Lokner
A herald	baritone	Bréfel
A bourgeois	baritone	Guillot
Dindenault, sheep merchant	spoken	L. Muratet
Chorus: People of Paris, bourgeois, Thelemites, merchants, soldiers, Lanternois.

== Synopsis ==
=== Act 1 ===
A crowd of townspeople have gathered outside the tavern of Alcofibras, the 'Hostellerie du Coq à l’Asne' in Les Halles, on Mardi Gras. Pantagruel and his squires order wine. Panurge has entered and Pantagruel beckons the hungry newcomer to join his party. Panurge addresses his host in Italian, German, and finally French. Panurge claims that he has lost his wife, Colombe, that very morning and can't decide whether to laugh or cry. The others encourage him to drown his sorrows in wine.
Once everyone has entered the tavern, Colombe herself comes along and hears the voice of her husband; she explains that she feigned death to escape his drunken behaviour. She calls on him to come out and presents herself to him but he says that he does not recognize her. Enraged, Colombe is held by Pantagruel's squires, while Panuge escapes with Pantagruel to a monastery where he can hide from his wife.

=== Act 2 ===
At daybreak in the main courtyard of the Abbaye de Thélème, Thelemites and Ribaude greet the morning. When the crowd has left, Panurge enters, pleased with such a congenial refuge and makes advances to Ribaude. Pantagruel arrives with his followers and Jean welcomes as an old friend, describing the customs of the monastery, where there is no Lent and monks pray to Bacchus and nuns to Venus.
Colombe also now enters, having followed her husband to the abbey, and meets Ribaude who lets her know that Panurge was courting her only just before.
A large meal is prepared in the courtyard by the servants; instead of saying grace, Pantagruel only praises the vine. Panurge wonders whether he should remarry as he can't recall his former wife, and asks for counsel from the philosopher Brid'oye, the poet Raminagrobis and the physician Rondibilis.
When Ribaude re-enters Panurge tries to flirt with her again, but is spurned by Ribaude who knows that he is married. Colombe sits at Pantagruel's table and makes confession to Panurge disguised as a monk, of all her transgressions. Panurge cannot contain his jealousy and tells her that he knows the husband, who has fled to the Ile des Lanternes. Colombe says that she will pursue him and leaves, while in a fury Panurge breaks everything at the tables.

=== Act 3 ===
Colombe, dressed as a priestess and oracle of Bacchus, tells the Queen of the Lanternois how she misses her husband. Panurge arrives, looking for his wife; Queen Baguenaude invites him to rest awhile and consult the oracle of Bacchus. Colombe prepares to assume the part of Sibyl, while Panurge offers to make a sacrifice of a lamb. He rejects the price demanded and tosses the lamb into the sea, after which the shepherd and locals dive in to rescue it.
The Sibyl now enters and answers Panurge's enquiries, saying that he will find his wife when he drinks less and stops beating her. Jean, Pantagruel and the followers next arrive by boat. Colombe, having taken off the disguise, joins her husband and calls for wine; the Queen reminds Panurge of his oath. All raise their cups in rejoicing as the curtain falls.
