= L'enfant prodigue (Debussy) =

Scène lyrique, or lyric scene, by Debussy

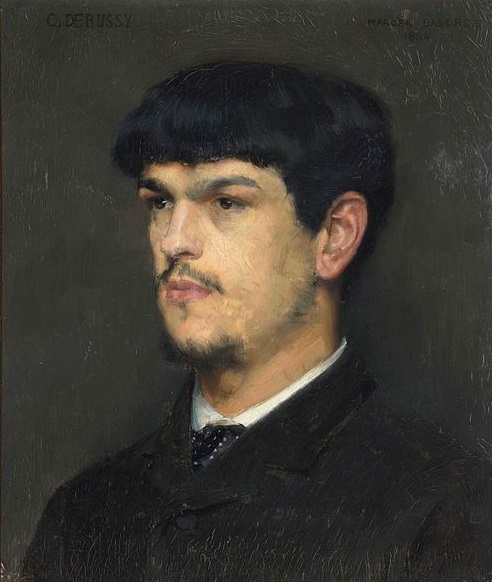
Portrait of Claude Debussy by Marcel Baschet, 1884

L'enfant prodigue (The Prodigal Son) is a scène lyrique, or lyric scene, by Claude Debussy to a text by Édouard Guinand. Scored for soprano, tenor, baritone and piano, it bears the catalog number L.61. Its premiere came on June 27, 1884, in Paris in the composition category of the Prix de Rome competition, which it handily won with Debussy receiving 22 out of 28 votes; the vocal soloists were Rose Caron (Lia), Ernest Van Dyck (Azaël) and Émile-Alexandre Taskin (Siméon). Debussy's prize included a three-year (1885-1887) Académie des Beaux-Arts scholastic residency at the Villa Medici.

With the help of André Caplet in 1907, L'enfant prodigue was orchestrated. The premiere of this version took place at the Sheffield Music Festival the following year conducted by Henry Wood. The work was first performed in the United States by the Detroit Fine Arts Society at that city's Century Association building on March 10, 1910, with tenor William Lavin among the soloists. In 2021 George Morton created a version of L'enfant prodigue with an ensemble of just ten instrumentalists accompanying the singers for performances by Opera on Location in Sheffield. Although the work was never intended to be staged, it has on occasion been presented as a one-act opera, such as at the Boston Opera House on November 16, 1910, with Alice Nielsen (Lia), Robert Lassalle (Azaël) and Ramon Blanchart (Siméon).

== Synopsis ==
At sunrise Lia (soprano) laments the absence of Azaël (tenor), her prodigal son, an outcast after leaving his home to pursue the world's pleasures. Siméon (baritone) is weary of her constant thinking of Azaël. After the appearance and dance of young villagers, Azaël enters, and is joyfully reunited with his mother. She urges Siméon to forgive and welcome him home which he does, calling for a feast of celebration and singing praises to God.

== Music ==
1. Prélude
2. Air : "L'année, en vain chasse l'année; Azaël, pourquoi m'as-tu quittée?"
3. Récit : "Eh bien, encor des pleurs !"
4. Cortège et Air de danse
5. Récit et Air : "Ces airs joyeux; O temps, à jamais effacé"
6. Récit et Air : "Je m'enfuis"
7. Duo : "Rouvre les yeux à la lumière"
8. Air : "Mon fils est revenu; Plus de vains soucis"
9. Trio : "Mon cœur renaît à l’espérance"

== Recordings ==
- 1982 – Jessye Norman, José Carreras, Dietrich Fischer-Dieskau, Stuttgart Radio Symphony Orchestra and Choir, conducted by Gary Bertini (Orfeo)
