= Massenet Festival =

Festival Massenet
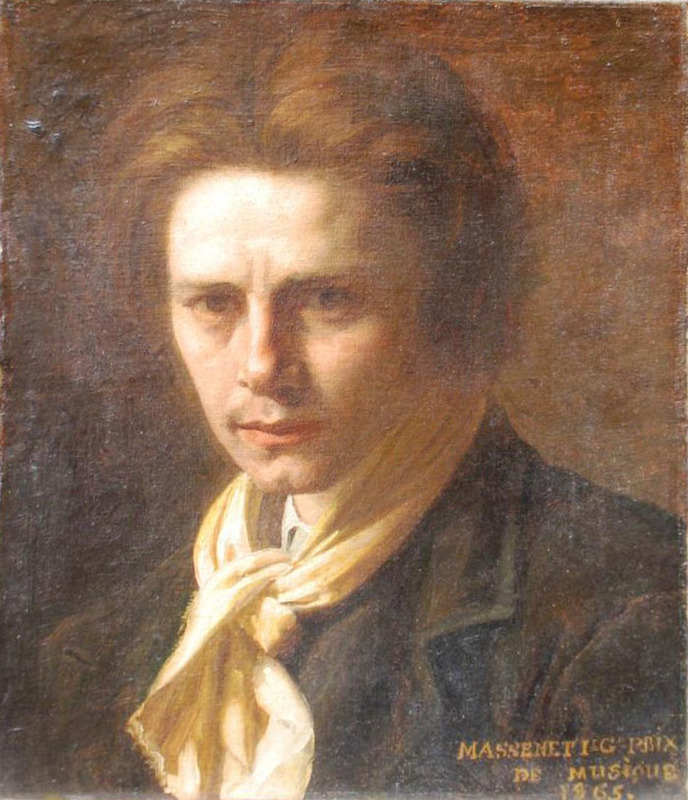
- Young Jules Massenet
- Genre: compositions by Jules Massenet
- Frequency: biennual
- Location: Saint-Etienne
- Inaugurated: 1990; 36 years ago
- Most recent: 2015
- People: Jean-Louis Pichon
- Website: www.rheingau-musik-festival.de

Massenet Festival is a biennale festival of music by French composer, Jules Massenet held in Saint-Étienne, France, close to the area where the composer was born. The first Massenet Festival took place in November 1990 when the opera Cléopâtre and the oratorio La Vierge were presented. In recent years, performances have been given in the Grand Théâtre Massenet, one of the theatres of the Opéra Théâtre de Saint-Etienne, and formerly known as L'Esplanade.

== History ==
Appointed to run the Opéra de Saint-Etienne in 1986, Jean-Louis Pichon invited Jean-Pierre Jacquillat to become musical director. Shortly afterwards, the elderly widow of a chief electrician at the Théâtre Eden handed over a mass of rare vocal scores, which included Amadis by Massenet. Intrigued, Pichon obtained a conductor's score for Jacquillat, but the conductor was killed in a road accident that August and a replacement was needed urgently. Eventually Pichon found Patrick Fournillier, then head of the Orchestre d'Auvergne.

The revival of Amadis in January 1988 was a great success, broadcast by Radio-France which led to a commercial issue with the orchestra and chorus of the Opéra de Paris. As part of the bicentenary celebration of the French revolution, Thérèse was staged in 1989 in several houses, Monte-Carlo, then Saint-Etienne, (whose production was selected to represent France at the European Festival of culture in Karlsruhe), then Łodz and Zagreb.

Following the success of staging Massenet's Amadis in 1988 during this "unofficial" festival of his work, the organizers decided to seek funding for regular festivals; the Région Rhône-Alpes and France Télécom became main sponsors and the first Festival Massenet took place in November 1990.

The Festival has occasionally incorporated a colloquy around the composer. In 1992 it was « Massenet et son œuvre dans le contexte esthétique de son temps ». Speakers in the latter included Roger Delage on Massenet and Chabrier, Steven Huebner on Wagnerism in Esclarmonde, Hugh Macdonald on Massenet and the comic, and the musical language of Massenet by Gérard Condé. In 2001 the subject was « Le livret d’opéra au temps de Massenet » (published as a book in 2002), with topics such as the career of Louis Gallet, use of Pierre Loti in the lyric theatre and Massenet's choice of operatic subjects.

The L'Esplanade opera house in Saint-Étienne burned down (by arson) in September 1998, and the originally planned co-production of Le Roi de Lahore with the Opéra de Bordeaux was first seen in that city before being staged in Saint-Etienne the following year in a temporary theatre on the site of the Foire-Exposition. The re-opening of the Théâtre de l’Esplanade in March 2001 featured Hérodiade (with Alexia Cousin, Alain Fondary, Béatrice Uria-Monzon and Luca Lombardo), and the sixth Festival in November that year offered Roma which Pichon had already produced for Martina Franca in 1999.

=== Festival highlights ===
In 1992 Esclarmonde was staged (with Denia Mazzola Gavazzeni in the title role) along with Grisélidis and the oratorio La Terre Promise (with Laurent Naouri), while the Third Massenet Festival in 1994 brought revivals of Panurge, and Le Cid. In 2003 the 7th Festival included Sapho, conducted by Laurent Campellone.

Over the years, the following Massenet operas have been presented:

- Cléopâtre and the oratorio La Vierge (1990)
- Esclarmonde, Grisélidis (concert) and the oratorio La Terre Promise (1992)
- Panurge, and Le Cid (concert) (1994)
- Thaïs (1996)
- Le roi de Lahore and ballets Le Carillon, and Le Cid (ballet music) (1999)
- Roma (November 2001)
- Sapho (2003)
- Le jongleur de Notre-Dame (2005), preceded by the ballet Le Cigale, contemporary with the opera
- Ariane (2007)
- Manon (2009)
- Cendrillon and Le mage (October/November 2012)

== Recordings ==
Festival performances before 1995 were released on audio CD (on the label Koch-Schwann) and others have followed, such as Thérèse from 2012 (on Ediciones Singulares).
