= Denia Mazzola =

Italian operatic soprano (born 1953)

Denia Mazzola - Gavazzeni (born 4 February 1953) is an Italian operatic soprano. In 1991, she married Gianandrea Gavazzeni (1909–1996), a famous conductor, 44 years her senior. She had the peak of her career between the years 1982 and 2015, when she decided to dedicate herself to teaching. She recorded in 2017 the Antonio Smareglia opera La Falena. As of 2021, she is still singing in events and recitals organized by her foundation.

== Life ==
She studied at the Conservatory of Verona under Rina Malatrasi, Rodolfo Celletti and Leyla Gencer. In September 1983 she had her professional debut which rapidly started her international career in roles such as: Gilda (in Rigoletto), the title role in Lucia di Lammermoor, Elvira (in I puritani), Adina (in L'elisir d'amore), and Norina (in Don Pasquale). She subsequently distinguished herself and her talent for dramatic coloratura roles as Violetta in La Traviata, the title roles in Lucrezia Borgia and Maria Stuarda, Elisabetta in Roberto Devereux, and the very demanding title role in Esclarmonde which she sang first during the Massenet Festival in Saint-Étienne (October 1992), repeating it in Teatro Massimo of Palermo (January 1993).

Denia Mazzola Gavazzeni appeared on prestigious stages, including Milan's La Scala, La Fenice, Filharmonico Verona, San Carlo, Comunale of Florence, Bellini di Catania, Carlo Felice di Genoa, and cities as Cagliari, New York City, Rio de Janeiro, Mexico City, Santiago de Chile, Pretoria, Cape Town, Durban, Johannesburg Vienna, Hamburg, Frankfurt, Cologne, and others.

She made series of DVDs and CDs recordings, including Esclarmonde (Koch-Schwann, 1994), Parisina (Actes Sud, 2000), Caterina Cornaro (Agora, 1996), Lucia di Lammermoor (Nuova Era, 1989), “Medea”(Kicco Music), “La falena”, “Il vassallo di Szigeth”, “Zingari”, “Didon”, “Cecilia”, “L’incantesimo”, “, “La Vièrge”, "L’enfant prodigue”, “Eve”, “Marie Magdeleine” (ediz Bongiovanni)
