= Émile-Alexandre Taskin =

French opera singer

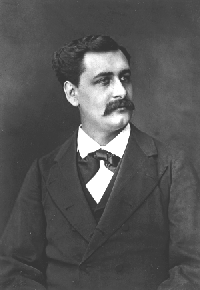
Émile-Alexandre Taskin in 1884.

Émile-Alexandre Taskin, born in Paris on 18 March 1853, and died there on 5 October 1897, was a French operatic baritone mainly active at the Paris Opéra-Comique. He was a descendant of the harpsichord maker Pascal Taskin (1723–1793).

After singing in church choirs as a child, Taskin studied at the Conservatoire de Paris under Bussine and Ponchard. Having made his debut as a concert singer in 1875 in L'enfance du Christ by Berlioz, his stage debut was in September 1875 in Amiens, as Roland in Les mousquetaires de la reine by Halévy.

After other engagements in the provinces Taskin was taken on at the Théâtre Lyrique (Salle Ventadour) in 1878, creating Lampourde in Le Capitaine Fracasse on 2 July 1878. He made his debut at the Opéra-Comique as Malipieri in Auber's Haydée on 9 February the same year, joining the company soon after. He was on-stage singing Lothario in Thomas' Mignon the night of the fire at the Salle Favart on 25 May 1887, and later received a médaille de sauvetage (rescue medal); he sang in the 1,000th performance of the opera in that house.

His repertoire also covered Count Almaviva (The Marriage of Figaro), Escamillo (Carmen), Ourrias (Mireille), Sulpice (La fille du régiment), Jupiter (Philémon et Baucis), the Tambour-Major (Le Caïd by Thomas), and Père Lorenzo (Amants de Vérone by d'Ivry).

Besides Le Capitaine Fracasse by Pessard, Taskin created roles in Jean de Nivelle (le Charolais) by Léo Delibes on 8 March 1880, Les contes d'Hoffmann (Lindorf, Coppelius and Docteur Miracle) by Offenbach on 18 February 1881, Manon (Lescaut) by Massenet on 19 January 1884, Proserpine (Squarocca) by Saint-Saëns on 14 March 1887, and Esclarmonde (Phorcas) by Massenet on 14 May 1889.

Taskin sang in the first performance of Debussy's L'enfant prodigue in Paris on 27 July 1884.

With increasing ill-health he retired from the stage and became a professor at the Conservatoire (opéra comique) on 1 May 1891.

He died at his home in the rue de Rome at the age of 44, and was buried at the Cimetière de Saint-Ouen.
