= Elen Dosia =

French opera singer

Elen Dosia (1915 – 10 May 2002), born Hélène Odette Zygomala, sometimes known as Ellen Dosia, was a French opera singer of Greek origin.

Dosia was born in Istanbul, then in the Ottoman Empire. She became a soprano singer, and enjoyed her first major success at age 20 with the title part in Tosca. She quickly became one of the most popular singers at Opéra Garnier and Opéra-Comique, where she performed from 1935 through 1952. Before World War II she was described as "the most popular singer in the world". She appeared often in Massenet operas, performing in Manon and Thaïs, and appearing at the June 1942 Massenet Gala singing the title role in a tableau of Esclarmonde.

In 1951 she appeared in the documentary Of Men and Music, singing excerpts from Salome's part in Hérodiade.

On 15 November 1947 Dosia debuted at the Metropolitan Opera as Tosca to Jan Peerce's Cavaradossi and Frank Valentino's Scarpia with Giuseppe Antonicelli conducting. Her performance was relatively poorly received; reviews were critical, and after only five performances (in both Tosca and Manon, and as Mélisande in Pelléas et Mélisande the following season), she retired from the stage in 1952. Thereafter Dosia concentrated on her family life.

== Recordings ==
- Thaïs (Malibran Music, Gressier, Paris 1944)
