= Mikhail Mikhaylov (tenor) =

Russian opera singer

Mikhail Ivanovich Mikhaylov (Russian: Михаил Иванович Михайлов) (27 October 1858 – 6 October 1929) was a well-known Russian opera singer (tenor). He graduated from the Moscow Conservatory. At first, he sang in Kiev and Tiflis, and, between 1884 and 1896, on the Imperial operatic stage in Saint Petersburg.

He possessed a sonorous and tender voice, and excelled at singing in his upper range. He sang the roles of Raul (Les Huguenots), Radames (Aida), Roland (Esclarmonde), Prince (Rusalka), title role in Faust, and many other operas in the Russian repertoire.

Russian composer Anton Rubinstein dedicated one of his many songs, "Autumn" (1891), to Mikhaylov.
