= Ivan Yershov =

Russian opera singer

Ivan Vasiliyevitch Yershov or Ershov (Russian: Иван Васильевич Ершов) (November 8, 1867 – November 21, 1943), PAU, was a Soviet and Russian opera singer (Heldentenor). He earned renown for his brilliant performances at the Mariinsky Theatre in Saint Petersburg, performing some of the most demanding roles written for the dramatic tenor voice.

== Career ==
Yershov was born illegitimate into a poor family in Novocherkassk. He entered the Aleksandrovsk railroad school in 1884 and trained to become a mechanic/engine driver. In his spare time, he sang in choirs. The outstanding potential of his voice was noticed and he received singing lessons in Moscow. In 1888, Anton Rubinstein awarded him a scholarship to the Saint Petersburg Conservatory where he was assigned to the class of the distinguished teacher Stanislav Ivanovich Gabel (1849–1924). He studied, too, with Joseph Palacek at the conservatory.

According to the Concise Oxford Dictionary of Opera at least, Yershov made his operatic debut in Saint Petersburg in 1893 as Gounod's Faust.

The young tenor travelled to Italy the following year to complete his studies in Milan with Ernesto Rossi. While in Italy, he performed at Turin and at Reggio Emilia, appearing as Don Jose in Carmen and Canio in Pagliacci. He returned to Russia in 1894 and took up an engagement with the Kharkov Opera. Here he sang a variety of roles as diverse as Romeo in Roméo et Juliette, Arturo in I puritani, Samson in Samson and Delilah, Vladimir in Prince Igor and Ernani in Ernani. Yershov met with considerable success at Kharkov, although his voice still exhibited some shortcomings. Such was his promise, however, he was offered a contract by Russia's foremost opera house, the Mariinsky Theatre in Saint Petersburg. His debut as a Mariinsky artist came in the title role of Faust in January 1895.

Yershov's singing continued to grow in size and technical assurance following his arrival at the Mariinsky. Before long, he was being hailed by audiences and music critics alike as Russia's finest dramatic tenor.

He would appear regularly at the Mariinsky in a wide spectrum of operatic works, including Peter Tchaikovsky's masterpiece Eugene Onegin, in which he sang the part of Lenski. He also sang the title roles in Tannhäuser and Lohengrin and appeared as Faust in Mefistofele. The part of Roland in Esclarmonde was added in 1897 to his repertoire. In 1900, he appeared as Tristan in Tristan und Isolde and Raoul in Les Huguenots. He sang the title role in Otello the next year, and that of Siegfried in Siegfried in 1902. He appeared, too, as Radames in Aida and Paolo in Francesca da Rimini in 1904. Other roles which he undertook included John of Leyden, Florestan, Grishka Kuterma, Sobinin, Tsar Berendey, Sadko, Finn, Mikhailo Tucha, Orest, Gvidan and Golitsyn. He also gave concerts featuring vocal music by Tchaikovsky, Modest Mussorgsky, J.S. Bach, G.F. Handel, Robert Schumann, Hector Berlioz and other prominent composers.

In private life Yershov was a reserved, serious-minded individual who shunned the limelight and was genuinely humble about his achievements. He also disliked travel and when Cosima Wagner asked him in 1901 to sing at the Bayreuth Festival, he declined the invitation on the grounds that he did not wish to restudy his Wagnerian roles in German. (He also feared that his musical interpretations would be stifled by the prevailing Bayreuth style of singing, which preferred Sprechgesang to bel canto.)

Yershov believed strongly that opera was an important art form and not mere entertainment for the wealthy. After the Russian Revolution of 1917, he concentrated most of his energies on producing operatic works and teaching vocal students at the Leningrad (Saint Petersburg) Conservatory, although, in February 1919, he agreed to perform the leading role in a revival of Rimsky-Korsakov's Kashchey the Deathless. He also sang Truffaldino in Prokofiev's The Love for Three Oranges, which received its premiere Russian performance in February 1926 at the Mariinsky (or the "Leningrad State Academic Theatre for Opera and Ballet" as it had been renamed by the Soviet authorities).

Yershov retired from the stage in 1929, having performed in approximately 55 different operas during the course of his career. In 1938, he was made a People's Artist of the Soviet Union and awarded a doctorate of musicology three years later. He was evacuated to Tashkent in Uzbekistan during the German army's invasion of Russia in World War II. Yershov died in Tashkent in 1943 at the age of 76. His remains were brought back to Russia for reinterment in 1956.

- Wife: Sofia Vladimirovna Akimova (1887–1972 ) opera singer soprano. Sophia Akimova was born in Tiflis, and received her vocal training under Maria Slavina. She became the wife of fellow opera singer and actor Ivan Vasilievich Ershov (1867–1943). Sofia performed as a soloist with the Marinskii Theatre in Petrograd, and was later appointed a professor of music at the Leningrad Conservatory.
- Son: Igor Ivanovich Ershov (1916–1985). Painter and graphic designer. He was born into an artistic family; his father Ivan Ershov was an opera singer with the Imperial Marinskii Theatre and his mother was both a singer and a professor at the St Petersburg Conservatoire.

In 1932, Ershov began his studies at the academy of Painting, Sculpture and Architecture. Amongst his professors were I.Brodsky and I.Bilibin, the masters of the «silver age» of Russian paintings. His studies were interrupted by the Second World War when he was evacuated to Tashkent. Ershov graduated from the Academy in 1947, presenting lithographs for A. Pushkin's Bronze Horseman. In 1949, a jubilee edition of Pushkin's works was published with illustrations by the artist. From the 1950s onwards, he worked mainly as an illustratorof children's books. At least two generations of Russian children grew up reading Khorovod with Ershov's illustrations. His illustrations for the Russian folk tales by Charles Perrault and Aleksandr Pushkin were very popular; The tale of the Golden Cockerel (1957-1960), A tale of the Fisherman and his wife (1956–57), Russian fairy-tales (1957–1960). Ershov also illustrated the books of contemporary poets such as M.Dudin, E.Rein, and G.Sapgir. The total publication of Ershov's children's books exceeds 1.2 million copies. Ershov's works can be found in the collections of a number of Russian museums including the State Russian Museum and Museum of A.S. Pushkin and in museums and private collections in both France and England.

- Xenia Krivocheine (bio provided by the granddaughter ) Paris "Une atmosphère de conte de fées" https://web.archive.org/web/20120407123403/http://www.egliserusse.eu/blogdiscussion/Une-atmosphere-de-conte-de-fees_a680.html

== Recordings and assessment ==
Yershov was praised, too, for his theatrical make-up skills and vivid stage presence. His acting was said to be on the same level as that of his celebrated contemporary, the bass Feodor Chaliapin.

- Mariia Platonova’s 1902 letter to Ershov illustrates how opera contributed to self-realization and gave embodiment to exalted, authenticating

confession. Platonova exhilaratingly wrote: “O Siegfried! Siegfried! Child of the world! Siegfried—joy, hope of the earth! Giver of life, radiant hero!” How much light, truth, and beauty there is in you, pure and youthful! You showed us young people what youth and life means. . . . You expressed it . . . through your person . . . gave a living, concrete picture, fulfilled a vague desire . . . I feel myself and my words to be small and pathetic before Siegfried . . . I want to pray before your creation and your talent. . . . I believe that there is a God, that he is great, having given us . . . aspiration to goodness and beauty, having given us your talent. . . . I view my entire life through fantasies, chasing after dreams and pursuing the most romantic ideals, the questions . . . of life . . . [Y]ou have riveted my interest and sympathy with the greatness of your personality.(Rossiiskaia natsionalnaia biblioteka (RNB), f. 275 (personal fond of Ivan Vasilievich Ershov), op. 1, d. 68, ll. 1–2 (letter from Mariia Sergeevna Platonova, daughter of the academic S. F. Platonov, to Ershov). Anna Fishzon " Slavic Review" 70, no. 4 (Winter 2011)
