= Julius Huehn =

American operatic singer

Julius Huehn (January 12, 1908 – June 8, 1971) was an operatic bass-baritone. He sang in over 200 performances with the Metropolitan Opera between 1935 and 1946.

== Life and career ==
Huehn was born in 1908 in Revere, Massachusetts. He graduated with a degree in voice from the Juilliard School, and then pursued further training privately with Anna Eugénie Schoen-René in Berlin and Sidney Dietch in New York.

Huehn's debut at the Metropolitan Opera was on December 21, 1935, as The Herald in Lohengrin. He also sang the role of Robinson in the Met's premiere of Cimarosa's opera Il matrimonio segreto on February 25, 1937. In addition, he appeared at the San Francisco Opera, the Philadelphia Opera, the Chicago Grand Opera Company, the Rochester Oratorio Society, the Chautauqua Opera and the Worcester Music Festival.

He served as a ground control officer in the U.S. Marine Corps during World War II after enlisting in 1944, holding the rank of captain. After his discharge he returned to the Metropolitan Opera for the 1946–47 season, but reports of the time indicate that his once-powerful baritone voice had all but faded. He spent the last 19 years of his life, from 1952 to 1971, teaching voice at the Eastman School of Music in Rochester, New York. His pupils included singers Philip Booth, John Glenn Paton and Sylvia Stone. He died in Rochester on June 8, 1971.

Huehn sang many Wagner roles, including Wotan in Das Rheingold and Die Walkuere, Donner in Das Rheingold, the Wanderer in Siegfried, Gunther in Goetterdaemmerung, Wolfram von Eschenbach in Tannhaeuser, Amfortas in Parsifal, Kothner in Die Meistersinger von Nürnberg, Kurwenal in Tristan und Isolde and Telramund in Lohengrin. Other operatic roles included Escamillo in Carmen, Faninal in Der Rosenkavalier, Orestes in Elektra, Jochanaan in Salome, Don Pizarro and Don Fernando in Fidelio, Sharpless in Madama Butterfly and the High Priest in Samson et Dalila .
