= Eduard Krushevsky =

Russian composer

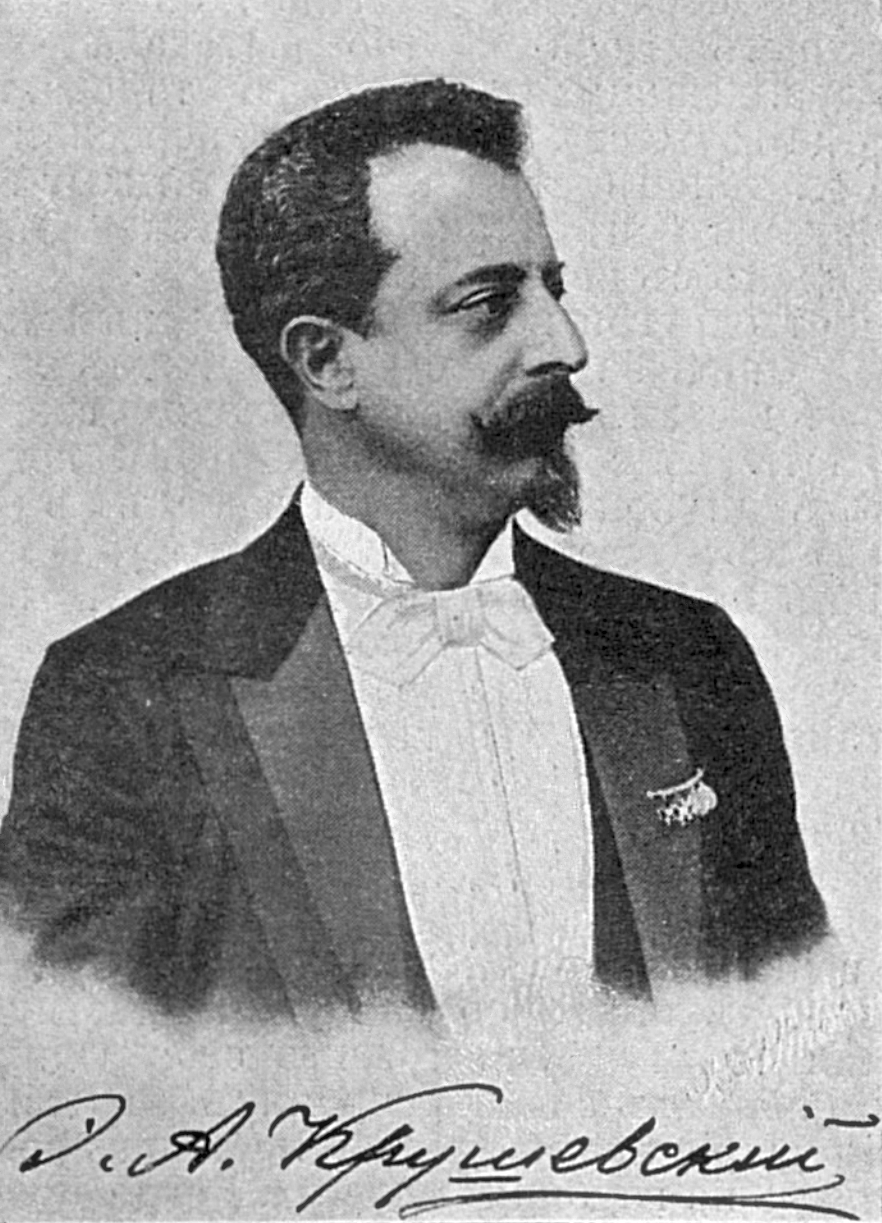
Eduard Andreevitch Krushevsky

Eduard Andreevitch Krushevsky (Russian: Эдуард Андреевич Крушевский; 22 October 1851, in Warsaw – 16 March 1916, in Petrograd) was a conductor and composer from the Russian Empire.

Born in Warsaw in 1857, Krushevsky finished study in Saint Petersburg Conservatory in 1890.

He was frequently conducting concerts of Imperial Russian musical society. He was capable to conduct without any preparation such difficult operas as Esclarmonde, Mlada, and Falstaff and that his very ability was the reason for hiring him as the second conductor of the Mariinsky Theatre (where Russian premieres of those works took place).

His compositions include a skillfully written overture and recitatives to the opera Il matrimonio segreto by Cimarosa. Krushevsky was also a first-class piano accompanist.
