= Opéra de Saint-Étienne =

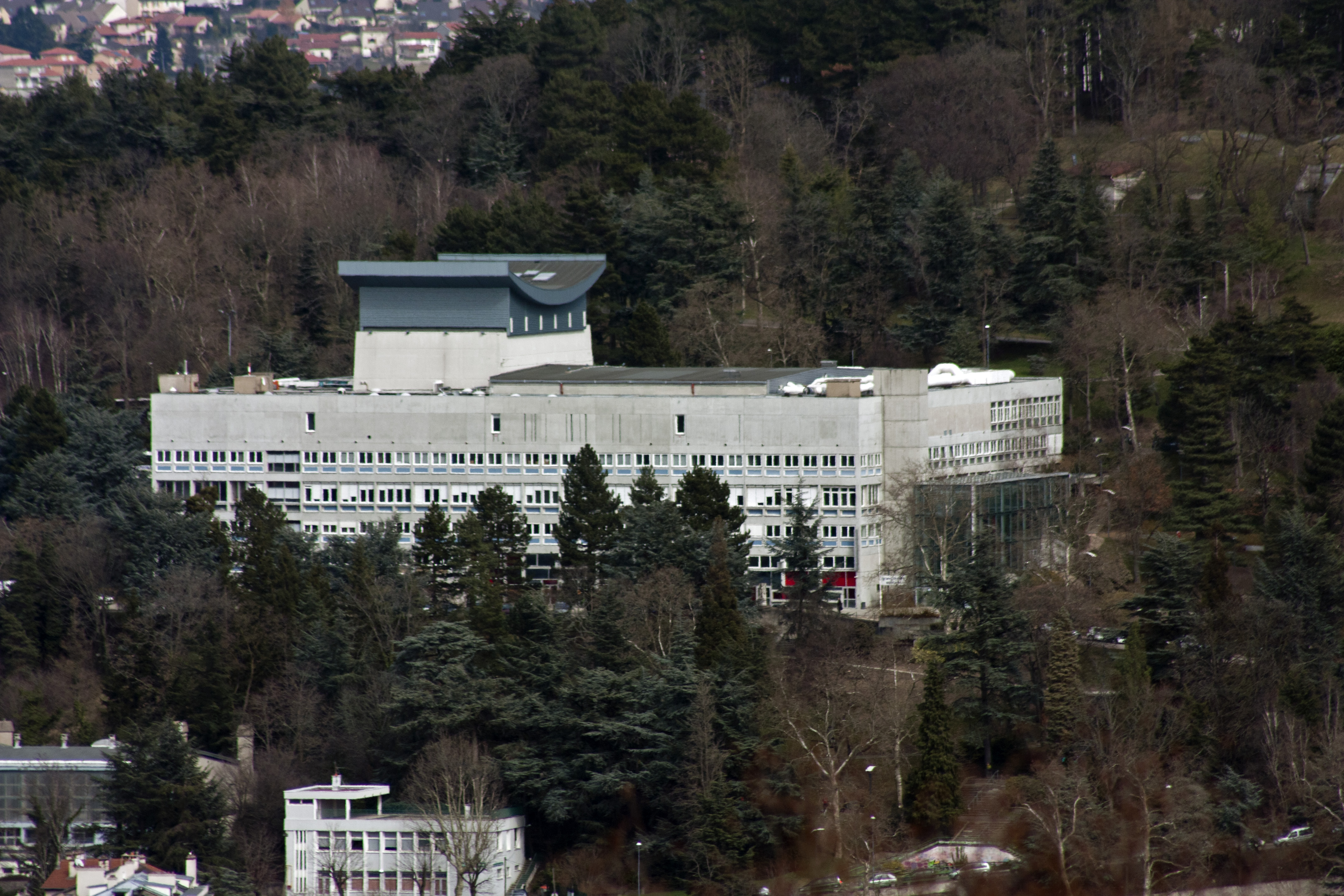
- Interactive map of Opéra de Saint-Étienne
- Former names: Maison de la Culture et des Loisirs; L'Esplanade; Opéra-Théâtre de Saint-Etienne
- Address: Saint-Étienne; France
- Coordinates: 45.4338°N 4.3978°E
- Designation: Opera house

Construction
- Opened: 4 February 1969

Website
- opera.saint-etienne.fr/otse

The Opéra de Saint-Étienne is a theatre mainly for opera in Saint-Étienne, France. It is a contemporary building, housing two halls, the Grand Théâtre Massenet and the Théâtre Copeau. The company is a member of the Réunion des Opéras de France.

== History ==
In 1969, the Maison de la Culture et des Loisirs de Saint-Étienne was founded by André Malraux. The theatre is under municipal derection. In 1994 the ensemble was named L'Esplanade. In 1998 the theatre was destroyed by fire It was reopened in 2001 and was renamed Opéra Théâtre de Saint-Étienne in 2006. In 2015 it was renamed Opéra de Saint-Étienne, with a focus on opera productions and a venue for the Orchestre Symphonique Saint-Étienne Loire (OSSEL) and the Chœur Lyrique Saint-Étienne Loire.

== Presentation ==
The large hall is visited by around 100,000 people per year. The cultural season offers more than 300 events in five main genres: piano, symphony, vocal, classical music and dance. The facilities for stage settings and costumes are housed in the same building, facilitating the new opera productions.

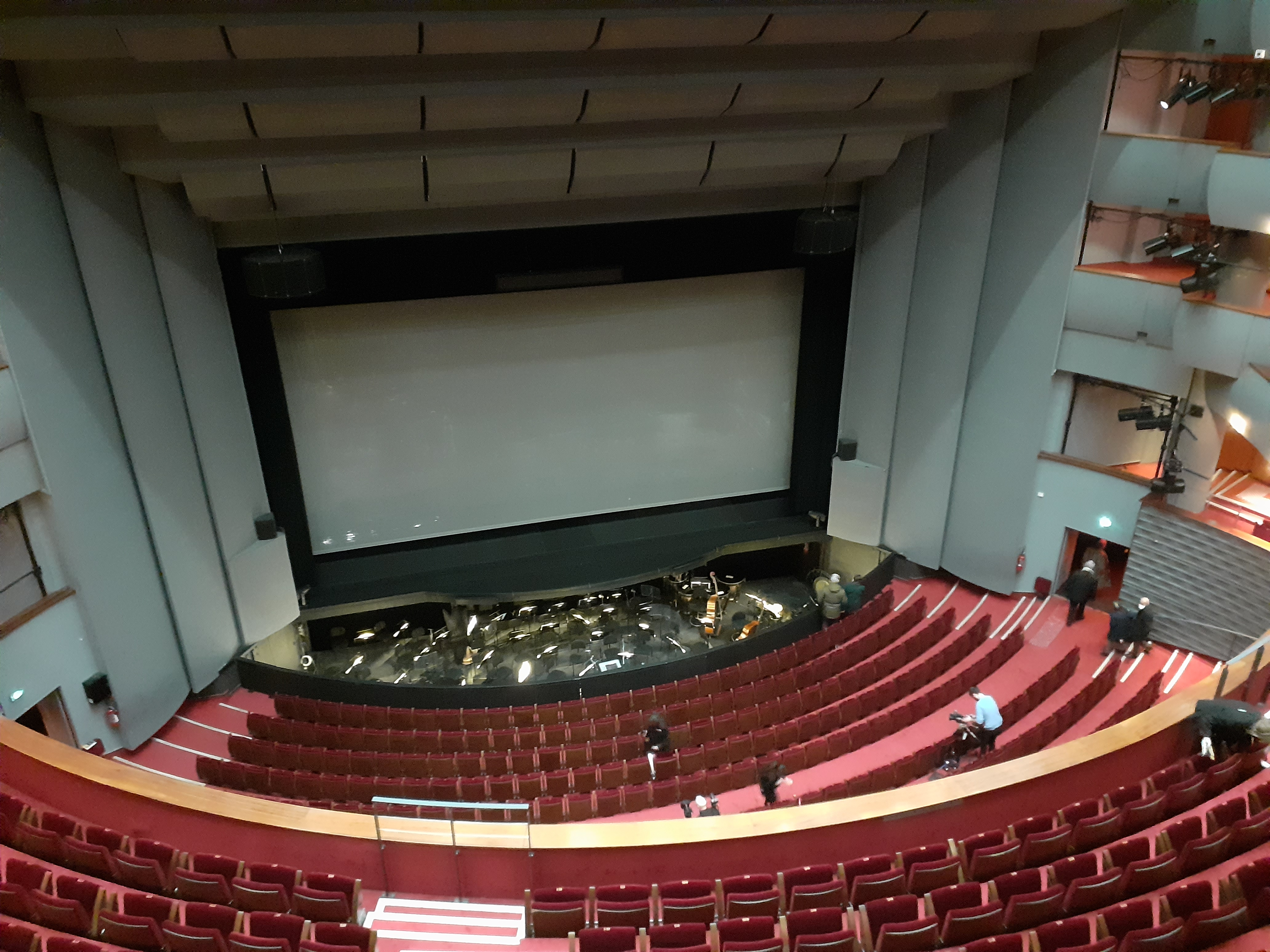
Grand théâtre Massenet
