= Patrick Fournillier =

French conductor

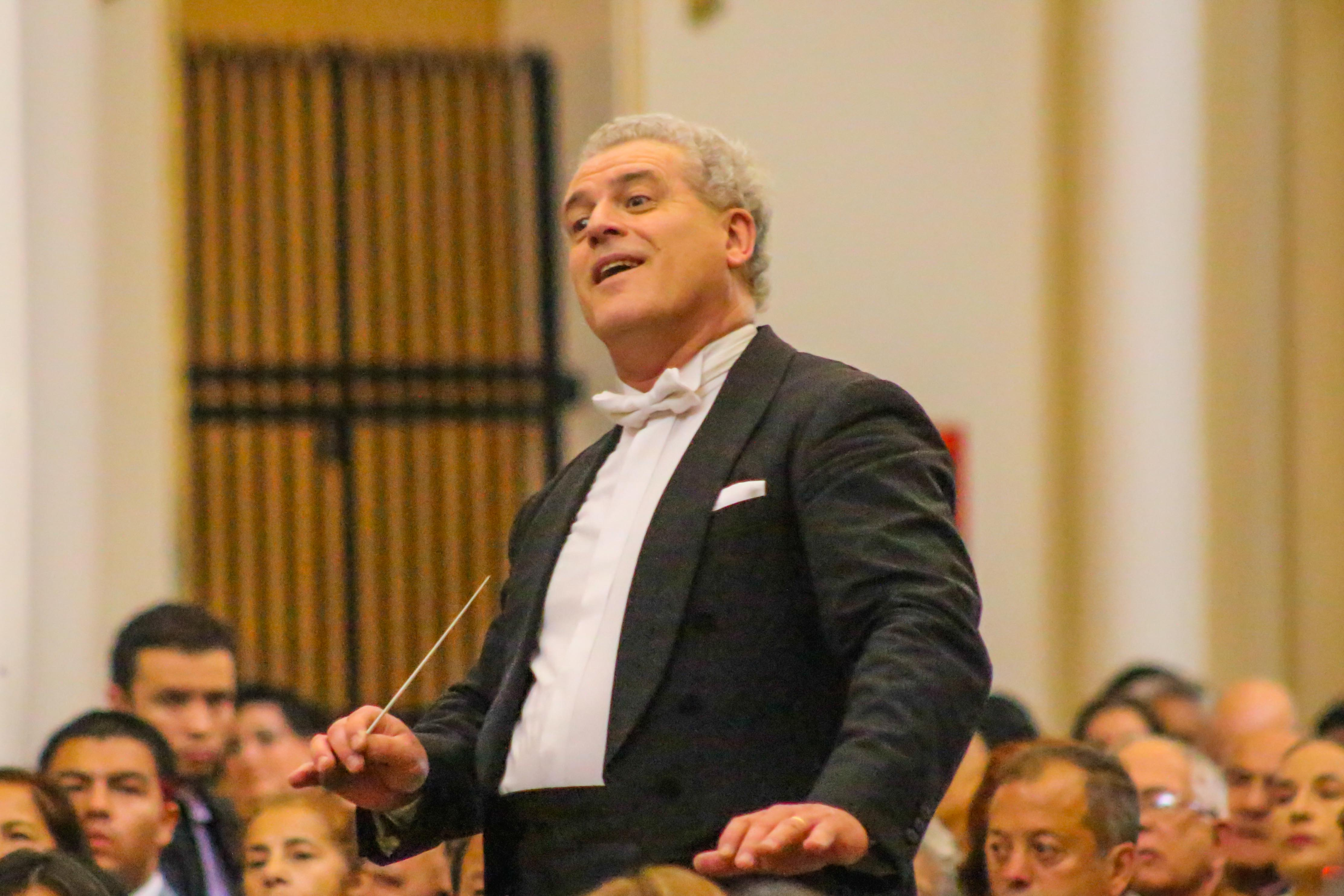
Patrick Fournillier conducting the Bogotá Philharmonic Orchestra.

Patrick Fournillier (born 26 December 1954 in Neuilly-sur-Seine) is a French conductor, particularly associated with opera and with the works of Jules Massenet.

He studied in Paris with Louis Fourestier and Pierre Dervaux, then in Strasbourg Conservatoire and Salzburg Mozarteum. Between 1983 and 1986 he was assistant conductor in l'Orchestre National de Lille, then become Artistic Director there. Since 1988 he is Music Director of the Nouvel Orchestre de Saint-Étienne and, since 1990, co-founder and Music Director of Massenet Festival at Saint Étienne, bringing many and the most neglected operatic and vocal works of Jules Massenet back to light again.

He was a recipient of many international rewards and prizes of conducting, including such as: the Hans Haring First International Prize (Salzburg 1982); Second Prize in the International Besançon Competition for Young Conductors in 1984; Václav Talich Competition Prague, Prize Winner in 1985; and Second Prize in The Grzegorz Fitelberg International Competition for Conductors in Katowice in 1987. Those many rewards brought him international acclaim and keeps him extremely busy, since many symphony orchestras and opera theatres around the world invited him either to be their guest conductor or even become their visiting music director.

From 1989 to 1992 he was the Director of the Picardy Sinfonietta in Amiens.

In 1989 he conducted the Paris Opera Ballet in Tchaikovsky's The Sleeping Beauty, and also the gala re-opening concert at the Opéra Comique in Paris, with June Anderson and Rockwell Blake. In 2018 Fournillier was appointed as principal guest conductor at the Finnish National Opera.

== Recordings ==
- Massenet: Amadis (1988)
- Massenet: Cléopâtre (1990)
- Auber: Manon Lescaut (1990)
- Massenet: La Vierge (1991)
- Massenet: Esclarmonde (1992)
- Haydn: Applausus (1992)
- Gounod: Sapho (1992)
- Massenet: Grisélidis (1992)
- Cherubini: Médée (1995)
- Donizetti: Lucia di Lammermoor (2003)
- Martin: Concerto for seven wind instruments, timpani, percussion, and string orchestra (2004)
- Alfano: Cyrano de Bergerac (2007)
- Chabrier : L'Etoile, Stéphanie d'Oustrac, Hélène Guilmette, Christophe Montagne, Jérome Varnier, Choeur de l'Opéra national des Pays-Bas, Orchestre de la Résidence de La Haye, conducted by Patrick Fournillier, stage, Laurent Pelly. DVD or Blu-ray Naxos 2019. Diapason d'or de l'année 2019.
