= Le roi de Lahore =

Opera by Jules Massenet

- Opera by Jules Massenet
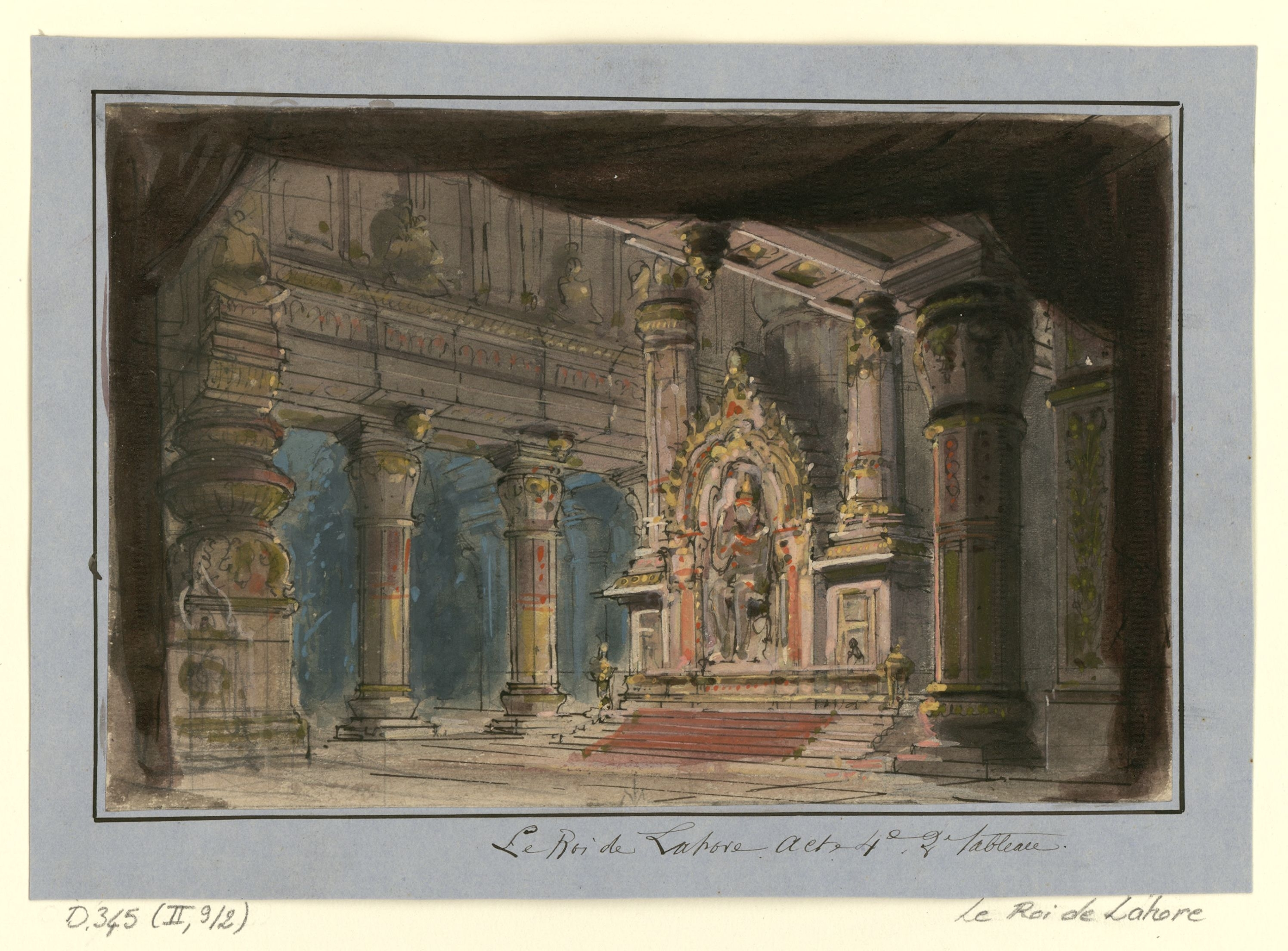
- Design by Philippe Chaperon for Act V
- Librettist: Louis Gallet
- Language: French
- Premiere: 27 April 1877; Palais Garnier, Paris

Le roi de Lahore ("The king of Lahore") is an opera in five acts by Jules Massenet to a French libretto by Louis Gallet. It was first performed at the Palais Garnier in Paris on 27 April 1877 in costumes designed by Eugène Lacoste and settings designed by Jean Émile Daran (Act I, scene 1), Auguste Alfred Rubé and Philippe Chaperon (Act I, scene 2; Act V), Louis Chéret (Act II), Jean-Baptiste Lavastre (Act III), Antoine Lavastre and Eugène Louis Carpezat (Act IV).

Le roi de Lahore is the third of Massenet's operas produced in Paris and was his first major success there, spawning performances across Europe and leading to his place as one of the most popular composers of his time.

== Performance history ==
Within a year of the premiere the opera was performed in several Italian cities including Turin, Rome, Bologna, and Venice. The Royal Opera House, Covent Garden, presented it in London in 1879. The US premiere took place in 1883 at the French Opera House in New Orleans and it was seen in Marseille in April 1905 and Monte Carlo in February 1906. The opera was mounted at the Verona Arena in 1923, but by the time of the Metropolitan Opera New York premiere the following year, with Giacomo Lauri-Volpi in the title role and Delia Reinhardt as Sita, Le roi de Lahore in particular, and Massenet's style of romantic opera in general, had faded in fashion so that it after six performances that year it has never been revived there.

More recent performances include a centenary revival by the Vancouver Opera in September 1977 starring Joan Sutherland and conducted by Richard Bonynge; it was then seen with Sutherland in Seattle. The score was recorded in London the following year by Sutherland and Bonynge. There was a revival at the Massenet Festival in Saint-Étienne in November 1999 in a production by Jean-Louis Pichon, which was also seen in Bordeaux that month.

Le roi de Lahore was mounted at the Teatro La Fenice in Venice in 2005 under the baton of Marcello Viotti, a performance of which was released on CD and DVD. The Chelsea Opera Group presented it in concert at the Queen Elizabeth Hall in 2015 with Michael Spyres in the title role. Dorset Opera Festival staged it in 2023.

== Roles ==
Role	Voice type	Premiere Cast, 27 April 1877 (Conductor: Édouard Deldevez)
Sitâ, priestess of Indra	soprano	Josephine de Reszke
Kaled, the king's servant	mezzo-soprano	Jeanne Fouquet
Alim, King of Lahore	tenor	Marius Salomon
Scindia, Minister to Alim	baritone	Jean Lassalle
Timour, high priest of Indra	bass	Auguste Boudouresque
Indra, an Indian deity	bass	Georges-François Menu
A chief	baritone	Numa Auguez
Soldiers, People, Priests, Priestesses, Celestial Beings; (Ballet) Apsaras, Nymphs.

== Synopsis ==
Time: 11th century.

=== Act 1 ===
Place: The temple of Indra, Lahore

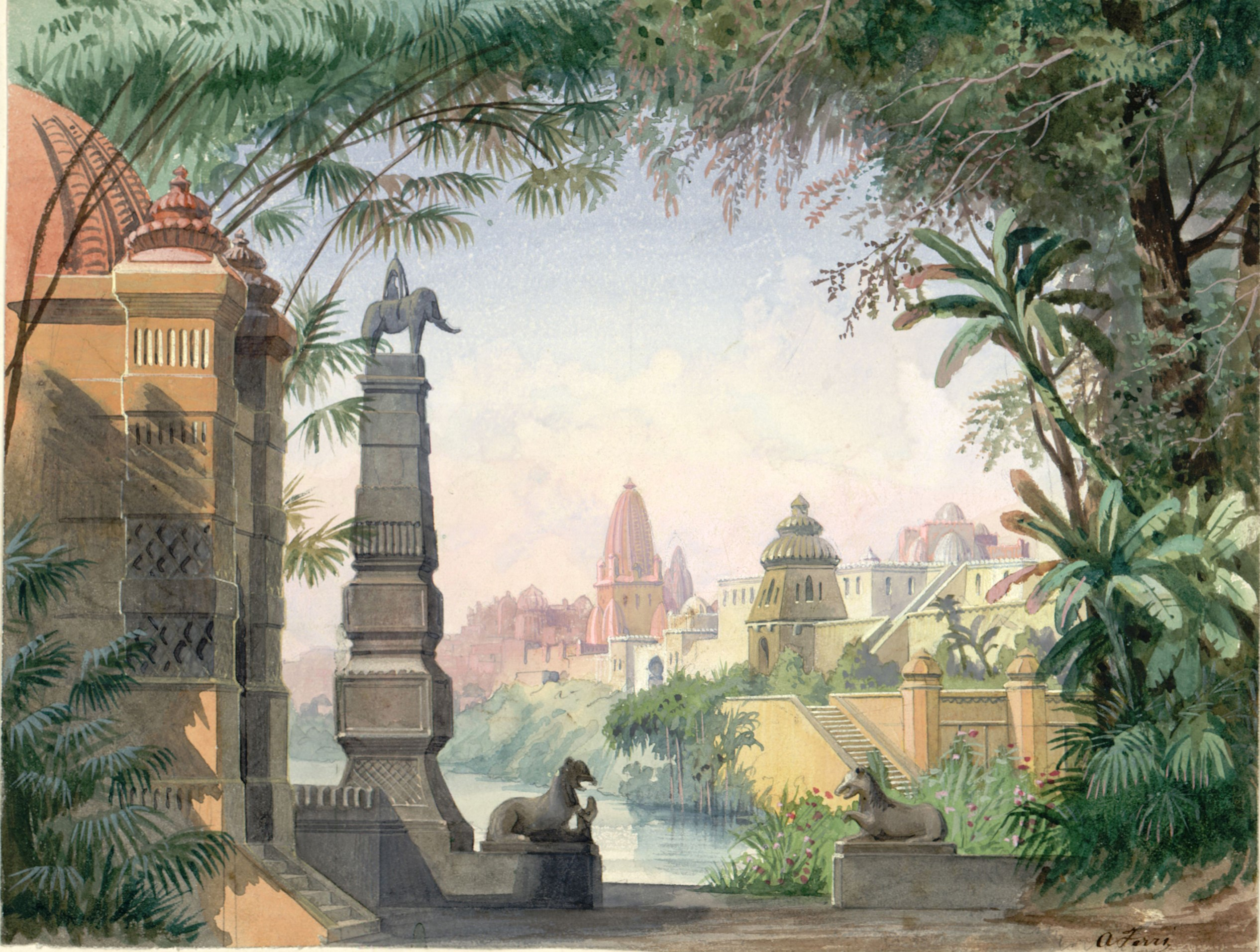
Set design by Augusto Ferri for Act One, Italian production (1878)

The citizens of Lahore gather at the temple to pray for divine protection against the Moslem invaders, and receive encouragement from Timour, the high priest. Scindia, minister of King Alim is in love with Sita, his niece, who is also a priestess at the temple. Scindia asks Timour to release Sita from her vows, and points out that she has been meeting a young man. In Indra's sanctuary, Scindia gets Sita to admit her interest in this young stranger, but she refuses to name him; Scindia accuses her of sacrilege, and the priests demand that she sing the evening prayer to lure the young man. A secret door opens and a young man appears: it is King Alim who confesses his love and asks for Sita's hand in marriage. Timour demands that the king expiate his actions by leading his army against the Muslims. Scindia schemes to arrange an ambush and kill the king.

=== Act 2 ===
Place: The desert of Thôl

At the king's encampment, where Sita has followed and pitched camp near the king as she awaits his return from the fighting, resolved to declare her love for him. The soldiers have been routed. Scindia gets them to join with him to usurp the throne. Alim enters, wounded, and realizes that Scindia must have betrayed him, he dies in Sita's arms. Scindia returns and triumphs over Alim's body; he declares himself the king and leaves for Lahore with Sita prisoner.

=== Act 3 ===
Place: The Paradise of Indra, Mount Meru

There are songs and dances by the apsaras. Alim's soul arrives but he admits to Indra that he misses the presence of Sita. Indra takes pity and agrees to restore Alim to life – as the humblest of beings – for as long as Sita lives, after which they will both die together; Alim happily agrees.

=== Act 4 ===
Place: a palace room in Lahore

Sita laments her fate and begs Indra to re-unite her with Alim. Fanfares announce the approach of Scindia, and she renounces the crown, praying for death.

Place: the palace square

Alim awakens back in Lahore at the entrance to the royal palace where the crowd is gathering for Scindia's coronation. Scindia enters, on his way to persuade Sita to marry him, but a vengeful vision blocks his path. Alim appears to the onlookers like a poor madman, and is ordered to be seized, but Timour says that he must be a visionary inspired by god. As Sita's palanquin enters, Scindia welcomes her as his queen.

=== Act 5 ===
Place: The sanctuary of Indra

Sita has sought refuge in Indra's sanctuary having fled forced marriage with Scindia. Alim is admitted to the sanctuary by Timour and the lovers meet again. Scindia arrives and threatens them both; Sita stabs herself and at once Alim again becomes a spirit, thus foiling the designs of Scindia. The temple walls change into a vision of paradise and Sita and Alim are united in celestial happiness, while Scindia falls to the ground in terror.

== Recordings ==
Year	Cast (Sitâ, Alim, Scindia)	Conductor, Opera House and Orchestra	Label
1979	Joan Sutherland, Luis Lima, Sherrill Milnes	Richard Bonynge, National Philharmonic Orchestra and London Voices	Audio CD: 433 851-2 Decca, DDD, total timing 146 min.
2004	Ana Maria Sanchez, Giuseppe Gipali, Vladimir Stoyanov	Marcello Viotti, Teatro La Fenice orchestra and chorus	Audio CD and DVD: Dynamic (critical edition edited by Marcello Viotti)
