= Giacomo Aragall =

Spanish operatic tenor

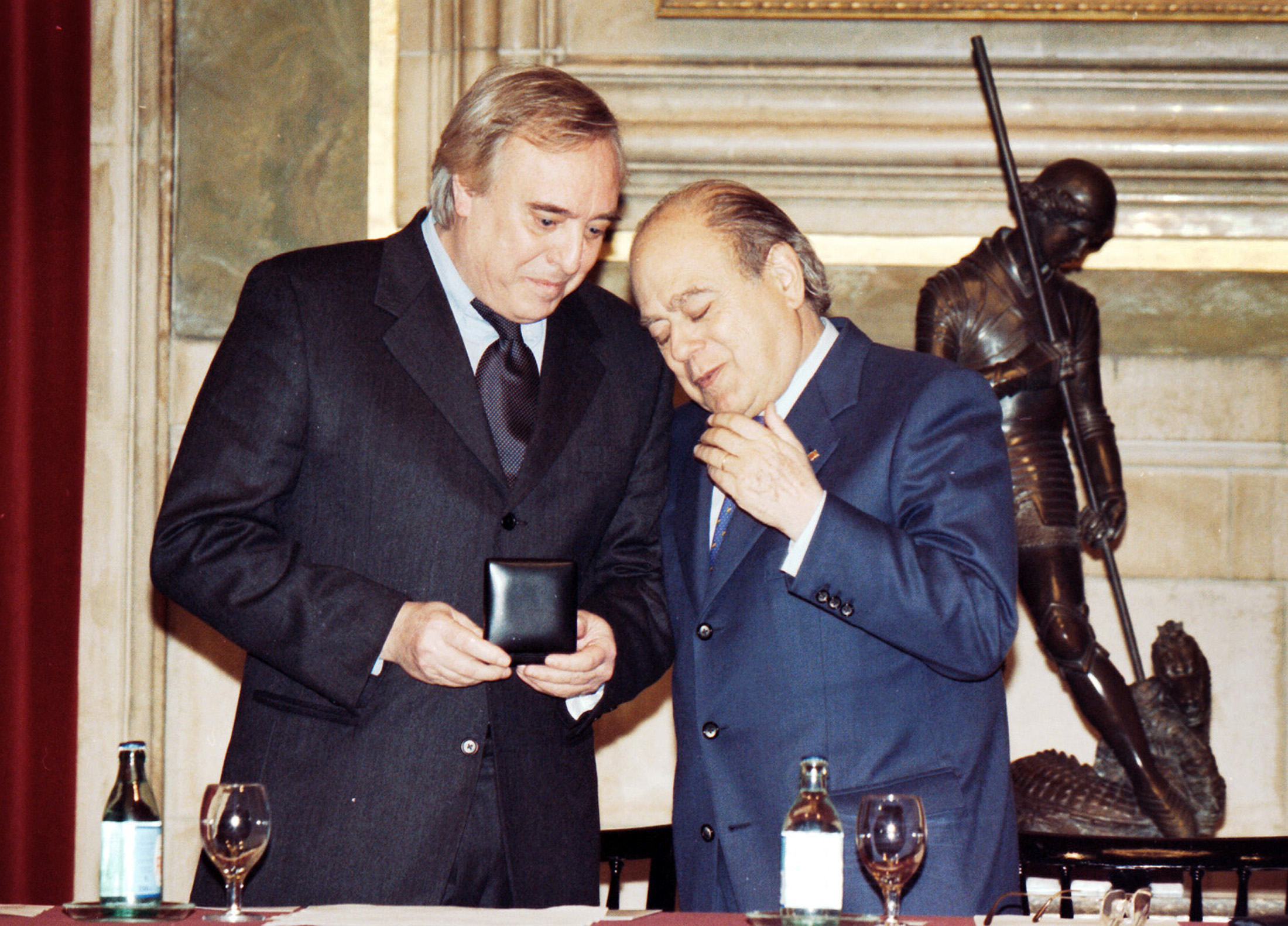
Giacomo Aragall (left)

Jaume Aragall i Garriga (Catalan pronunciation: [ˈʒawmə əɾəˈɣaʎ]; born 6 June 1939), better known as Giacomo Aragall, is a Spanish operatic tenor. He became known for his role singing Rodolfo in Puccini's La bohème in the late 1960s, and it would become one of the most frequently performed of his career. In 1994 he founded the Giacomo Aragall International Singing Competition.

== Early life and education ==
Aragall was born on 6 June 1939 in Barcelona. He became a member of the Choir of the Basilica of Santa Maria del Mar at the age of nine, and at the age of 19 he began his singing studies. He made his debut at the Gran Teatre del Liceu in the 1961–1962 season in the roles of Arlecchino in Pagliacci by Ruggero Leoncavallo and Arturo in Lucia di Lammermoor by Gaetano Donizetti.

== Career ==
Aragall's professional debut was at the Gran Teatro La Fenice, Venice, on 24 September 1963, in Verdi's opera Gerusalemme. The same year, he appeared at the Teatro alla Scala in Milan in L'amico Fritz by Pietro Mascagni, and signed a three-year contract with the theatre. In 1964 he performed at the Bavarian State Opera in Munich, and began performing in cities such as Berlin, Budapest, Venice, Genoa, Modena, Turin, Naples and Rome. In 1966 he received acclaim for his role singing Rodolfo in Puccini's La bohème at the Verona Arena and went on to sing this role in London's Covent Garden and the Metropolitan in 1968, at Buenos Aires's Teatro Colón in 1970 and in San Francisco in 1973. Rodolfo became one of his most frequently performed roles. In 1966, Aragall sang Romeo in Bellini's I Capuleti e i Montecchi at La Scala with Renata Scotto and Luciano Pavarotti.

In 1974, Aragall featured in Massenet's Esclarmonde with Joan Sutherland and Richard Bonynge in San Francisco and resumed his role singing Rodolfo in Covent Garden in 1979. In 1994 he founded the Giacomo Aragall International Singing Competition. In 1997 he toured Germany and sang the role of Pedro in Manuel de Falla's opera La vida breve at the reopening of Madrid's Teatro Real. The Vienna State Opera awarded him the kammersänger.
