= Maria Belooussova =

Russian pianist (died 2018)

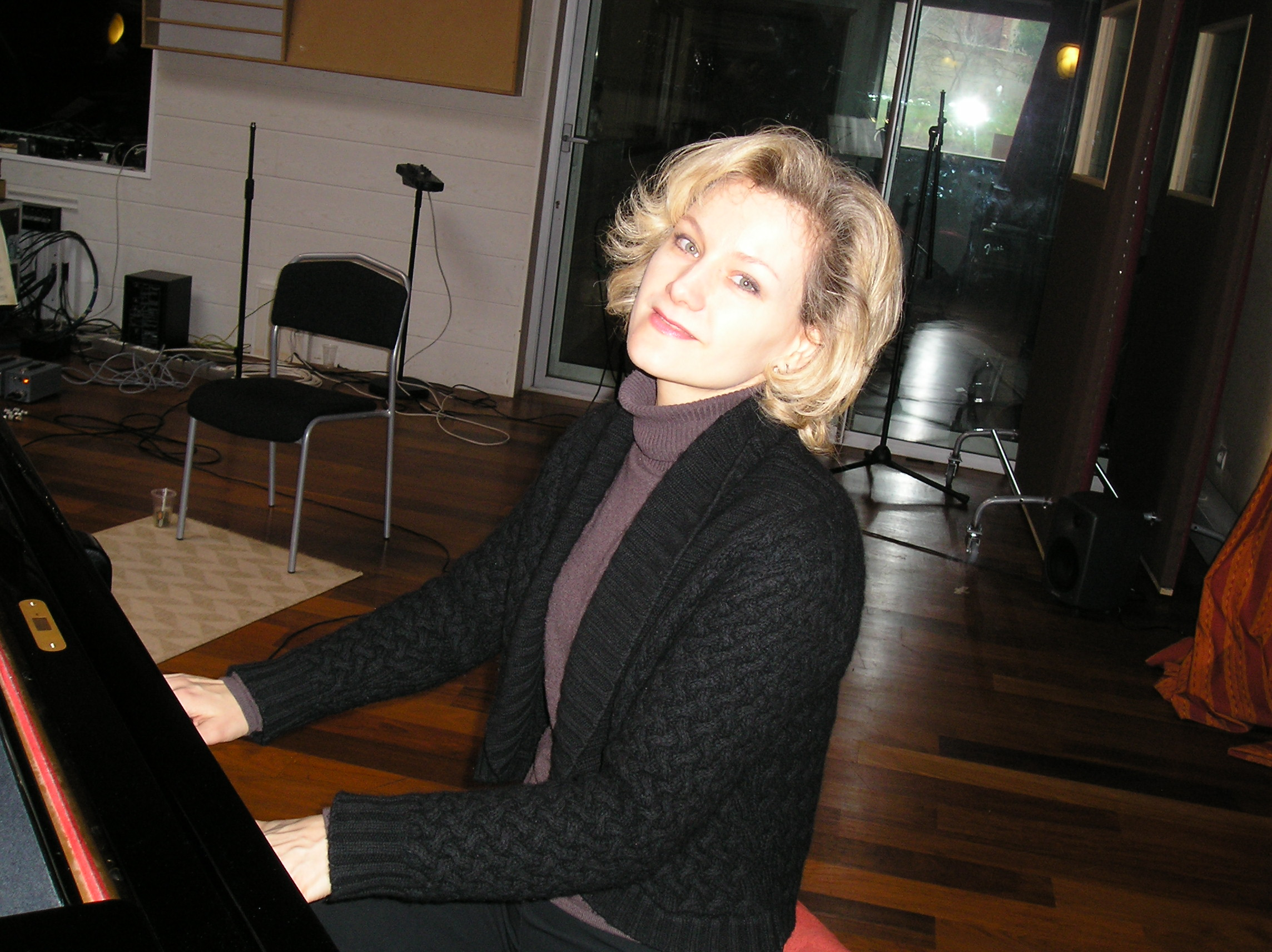

Background information
- Born: Yekaterinburg, Russia
- Origin: Russian
- Genres: Classical
- Occupation: Pianist
- Instrument: Piano
- Members: Musique Oblique, Les claviers de Giverny
- Website: www.maria-belooussova.net

Maria Belooussova was a Russian pianist. She lived and worked in Paris.

== Biography ==
Belooussova was born in Yekaterinburg and studied music there. She joined the Russian Musical Academy in Moscow, in the class of Vladimir Tropp. In 1992, she joined the National Conservatory of Music in Paris, in the class of Christian Ivaldi. From 1999, Belooussova taught chamber music at the Conservatoire de Paris. She died from cancer on May 30, 2018.

== Works ==
Belooussova was mainly interested in the chamber music repertoire. She played with many personalities including Ivry Gitlis, Bernard Greenhouse, Joseph Silverstein, Jean-Jacques Kantorow, Wolfgang Holzmair and Michel Strauss. She was also very attached to the contemporary music repertoire with the composers Krzysztof Penderecki, Sofia Goubaïdoulina, Philippe Hersant or Thierry Escaich.

In 1999, she joined the musical ensemble Musique Oblique composed of violinists Frédéric Laroque, Martial Gauthier and Daniel Vagner, cellist Diana Ligeti and clarinettist Rémi Lerner, with whom she recorded various albums.

In 2011, she created the piano duo, Les claviers de Giverny, with Raphael Drouin.

== Discography ==
- Eastern Wind, Sergueï Rachmaninov (Composer) Reinhold Glière (Composer), Maja Bogdanovic (Cello), Belooussova (Piano), Orchid Classics, February 2018
- Musique de chambre à Giverny, Franz Schubert, Robert Schumann, composers, Michel Strauss, cello, Belooussova, piano, Hybrid music, 2010
- Mélodies, duos et pièces religieuses, Emmanuel de Fonscolombe, composer, Anna-Maria Panzarella, Mario Hacquard, Belooussova, pianist, Hybrid music, 2008
- Premières mélodies du XXIe siècle, Anthony Girard, Vincent Bouchot, Denis Chouillet, Françoise Masset, Alain Rizoul, guitar, Robert Expert, Maguelone, 2008
- Quintette au bord de l'Oise : for violin, viola, cello, double bass and piano, texts by Bertrand Tavernier, photographs of Olivier Verley, Antoine Duhamel's music, Belooussova, piano, Pierre Feyler, double bass, Françoise Perrin, violin, Valhermeil Edition, 2006
- Les liaisons dangereuses : selected excerpts from the soundtrack of the film Dangerous Liaisons / Bach, Brahms, Mozart comp., Tedi Papavrami, violin, Belooussova, piano, Pan Classics, 2003
