= Luis Lima =

Argentine operatic tenor (born 1977)

Luis Lima (born 12 September 1948 in Córdoba, Argentina) is an Argentine operatic tenor, who studied in Buenos Aires under Carlos Guichandut and in Sicily under Gina Cigna. He made his opera debut in 1974, in Lisbon, in Cavalleria rusticana, and since then sang in seventy-seven performances at the Metropolitan Opera (from 1977 to 2001) in nine different roles, starting with Alfredo Germont in La traviata. He has also sung with the New York City Opera (1978–79, debuting in Madama Butterfly), at the Teatro alla Scala (first appearing in Lucia di Lammermoor, 1977) and the Royal Opera House, Covent Garden (from 1984).

In 1979, Lima recorded Massenet's Le roi de Lahore for Decca, opposite Dame Joan Sutherland. In 1988, he filmed Mozart's Così fan tutte, directed by Jean-Pierre Ponnelle and conducted by Nikolaus Harnoncourt, with Teresa Stratas as Despina and Ferruccio Furlanetto as Guglielmo. He also appears on a CD of Gemma di Vergi on CBS (now Sony) with Montserrat Caballé, Paul Plishka, and Louis Quilico, conducted by Eve Queler, and the zarzuela Bohemios with Maria Bayo on Valois.

There are also DVD releases from Covent Garden of Don Carlo with Ileana Cotrubas, Giorgio Zancanaro, and Robert Lloyd, led by Bernard Haitink, and Carmen with Maria Ewing, Leontina Vaduva, and Gino Quilico, conducted by Zubin Mehta.
