= La Vierge =

French oratorio

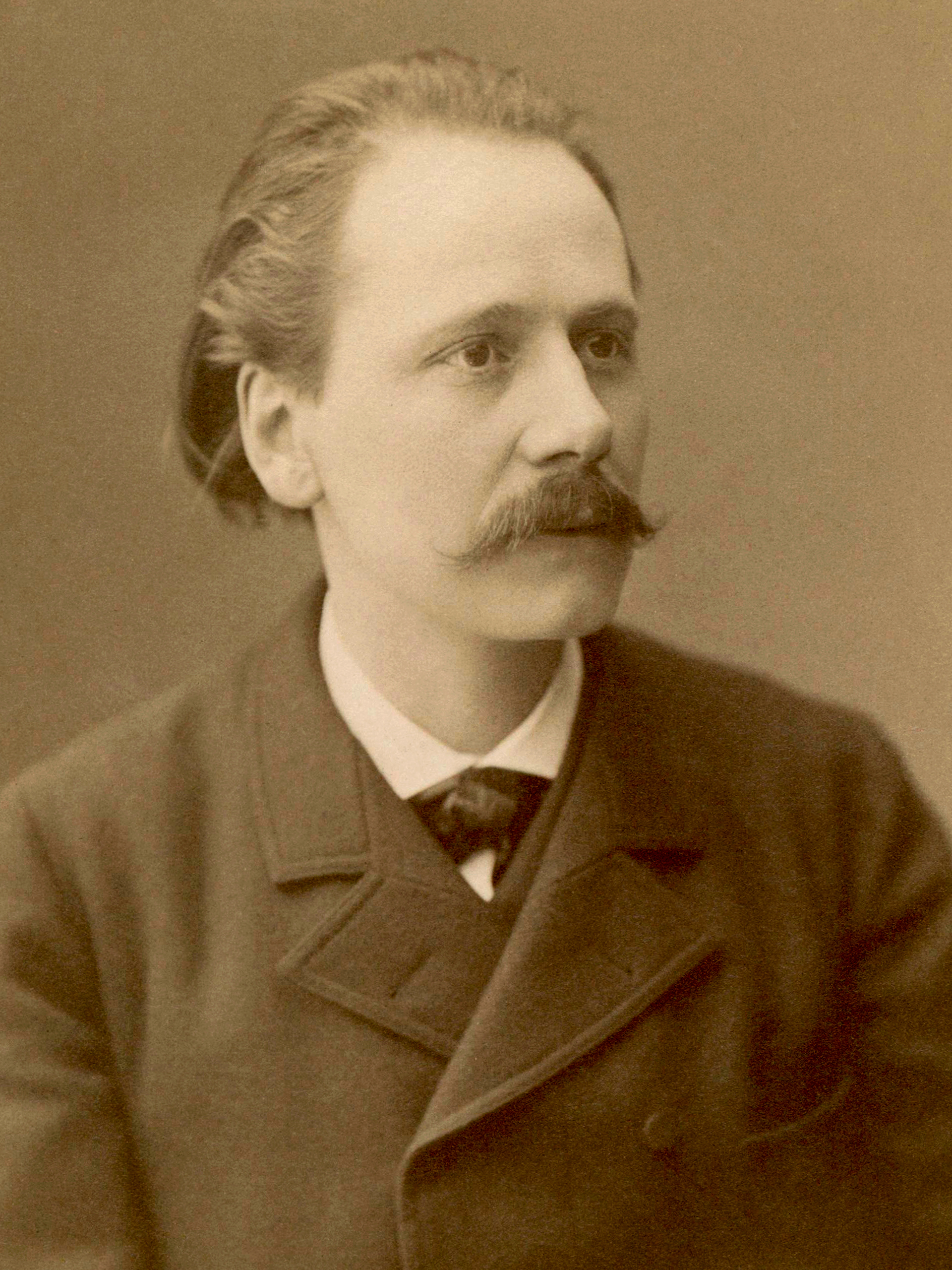
Jules Massenet in 1895

La Vierge is an oratorio (légende sacrée) in four scenes by Jules Massenet to a French libretto by Charles Grandmougin. It was first performed at the Opéra in Paris on May 22, 1880.

The oratorio is a recounting of the story of the Virgin Mary from the Annunciation to her death. In the first scene, Mary is visited by the Angel Gabriel and told that she will bear a son, Jesus. The second scene takes place at the Marriage at Cana where Jesus turns water to wine, and the third on Good Friday when Jesus is crucified. The fourth scene relates the Assumption of Mary into heaven. Although never popular as a whole, the orchestral piece "Le dernier sommeil de la vierge" (The Last Sleep of the Virgin) remains a popular encore piece to this day.

A recording conducted by Patrick Fournillier was issued by Koch Swann in 1991, and the soprano Montserrat Caballé has revived the piece in concert in recent years.
