= Maurice Renaud =

French opera singer

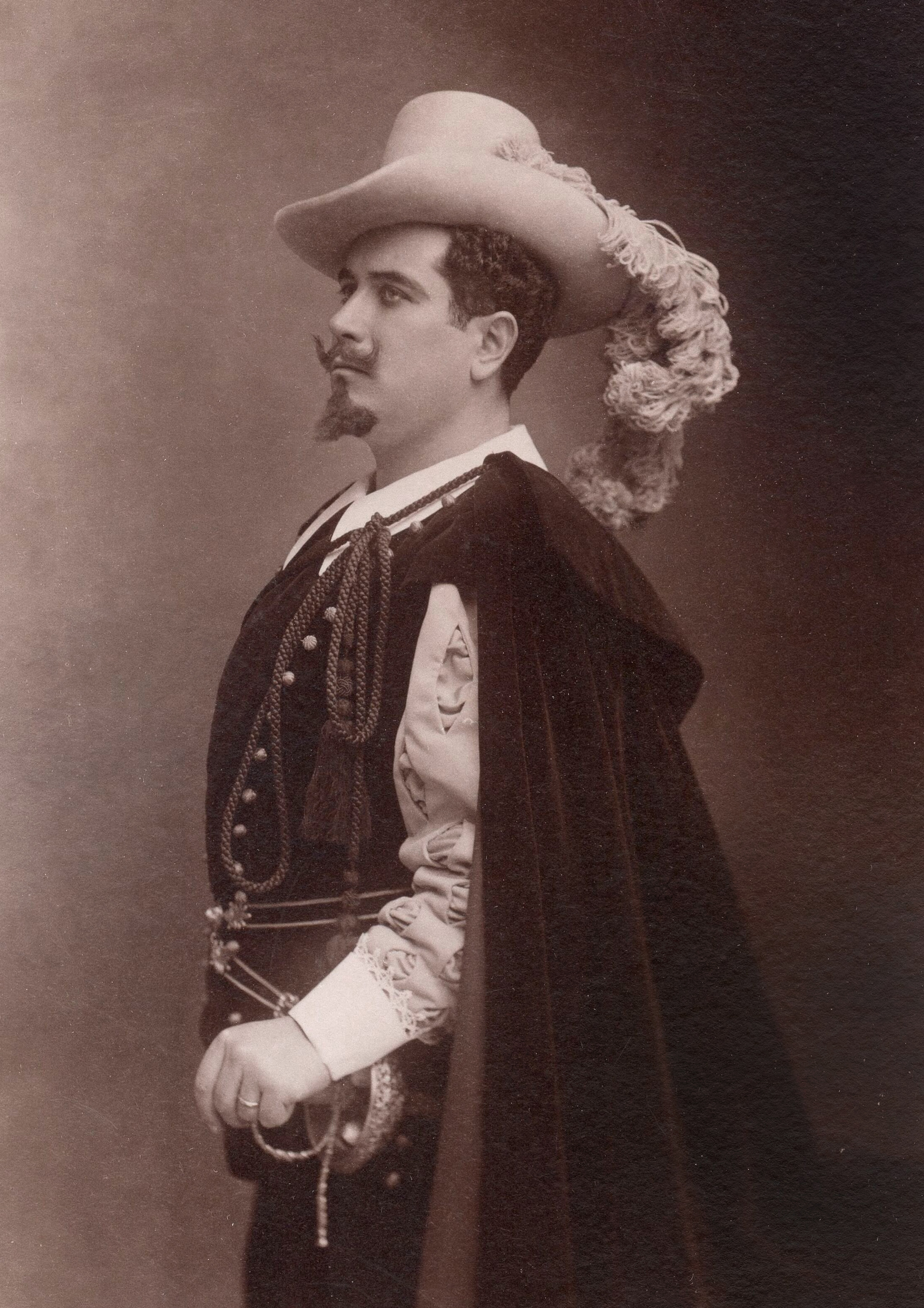
Renaud in Don Giovanni, 1896 (photo by Nadar)

Maurice Arnold Renaud (24 July 1861 – 16 October 1933) was a cultured French operatic baritone. He enjoyed an international reputation for the superlative quality of his singing and the brilliance of his acting.

== Early years ==
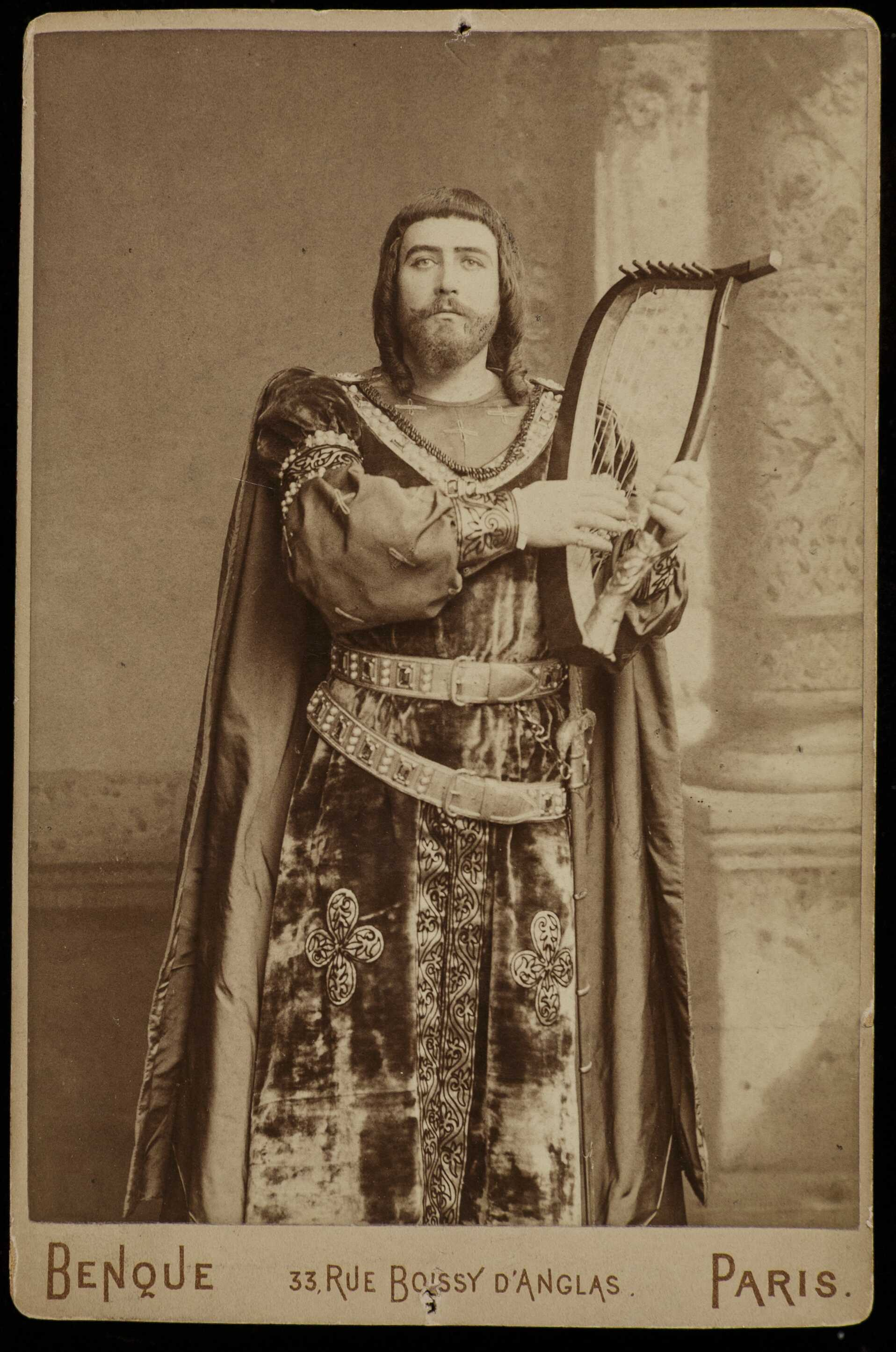
Renaud as Wolfram in Tannhäuser (photo by Wilhelm Benque)

Renaud was born in Bordeaux, as Arnaud Maurice Croneau. He studied for a year at the Paris Conservatoire, and then at the Brussels Conservatoire under Joseph Cornelis and Henri Warnots.

He made his début at the Théâtre Royal de la Monnaie, Brussels, in 1883 and remained with that company until 1890, singing in the premières of Ernest Reyer's Sigurd in 1884 and in his Salammbô in 1890, opposite Rose Caron in both. He would re-appear at the Monnaie also in the period 1908-14. In October 1890 he joined the Opéra-Comique, making his debut as Karnak in Lalo's Le roi d'Ys, and also singing title roles in Don Giovanni and Der fliegende Holländer and Scarpia in Tosca. The following year he moved to the Opéra, making his debut as Nelusko in Meyerbeer's L'Africaine. He continued to appear at the Opéra regularly until 1914.

== International career ==
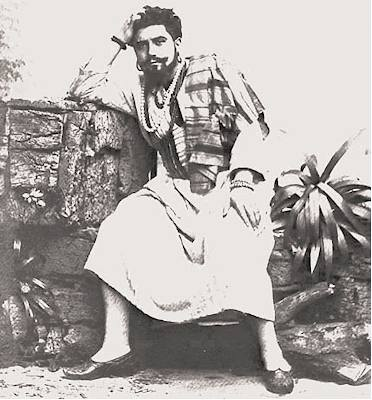
Renaud as Zurga in Bizet's Les pêcheurs de perles

Renaud's London début occurred during the Diamond Jubilee Gala at Covent Garden in June 1897. He sang in the Second Act of Tannhäuser with Emma Eames and Ernest van Dyck and in the Fourth Act of Les Huguenots with Albert Alvarez and Pol Plançon. Further performances at Covent Garden in 1897 included Don Giovanni with Ada Adini, Zélie de Lussan, and Marcel Journet. Renaud performed regularly in London until 1904 and made occasional appearances thereafter. Casts for these performances were often extraordinary: Carmen with Emma Calvé, Emma Eames, and Albert Saléza; Don Giovanni with Lilli Lehmann, Lillian Nordica or Emmy Destinn, Suzanne Adams, Zélie de Lussan and Edouard de Reszke; Manon with Mary Garden; Rigoletto with Nellie Melba or Selma Kurz, Enrico Caruso, and Marcel Journet.

Renaud toured extensively, appearing at Saint Petersburg, Berlin, Monte Carlo, where he sang in the premières of Massenet's Le jongleur de Notre-Dame (1902) and Chérubin (1905). In 1902 he sang Méphistophélès in Raoul Gunsbourg's staging of Berlioz' La damnation de Faust, both in Monte Carlo and at La Scala with Toscanini conducting.

== Renaud in New York ==
Maurice Grau, general manager of the Metropolitan Opera, signed a contract with Renaud, but various conflicts prevented the baritone from making his début at New York's premier opera house before the turn of the century. When Heinrich Conried succeeded Grau, he reneged on the contract with Renaud. The artist sued and won a substantial settlement.

In 1906, Oscar Hammerstein I signed Renaud for the Manhattan Opera House, at the urging of Nellie Melba, who loved his striking good looks and elegant Jean de Reszke-like persona. It is ironic then that Renaud's greatest triumphs at the Manhattan company would be associated with Mary Garden, a lady not known for her interest in male pulchritude. Renaud's debut there was in a memorable December 1906 Rigoletto with Melba and Alessandro Bonci as the duke. Then in November 1907 Mary Garden made her debut at the Manhattan in Massenet's Thaïs, with Renaud as Athanaël. W. J. Henderson wrote that "His Athanaël has never been rivaled. No one else succeeded in creating the same impression of intensity." Renaud's greatest parts at the Manhattan included Don Giovanni, Scarpia, Germont, Hérode in Hérodiade, and the three villains in The Tales of Hoffmann.

After Hammerstein was bought out in 1910, Renaud joined the Met, making his debut as Rigoletto on 25 November opposite Melba and Florencio Constantino. He sang with the company for two seasons, making his final appearance in March 1912 as Valentin in Gounod's Faust.

== Later years ==
Maurice Renaud occasionally performed with the Boston and Chicago-Philadelphia companies during his final years in America. On 21 November 1910, he appeared as Scarpia with Carmen Melis, later Renata Tebaldi's teacher, prompting the Boston critic Horatio Parker to write, "...this was as vivid and racking a performance of Tosca since it first came to the stage!" In his final London performances in 1911 at Hammerstein's London Opera House he sang in Hérodiade, Rigoletto, Tales of Hoffmann and Nouguès' Quo Vadis.

During the Great War, Renaud gave concerts for the troops and was wounded at the front when he and others in a trench took an artillery hit. He was left an invalid. After the War he was awarded the Légion d'honneur by the French government. In April 1919, after appearing at a Paris Opéra gala, Renaud finally retired. He appeared in a silent film in 1920. He died in Paris.

== Records ==
Maurice Renaud made 52 extant records, 45 of them for The Gramophone Company (the forerunner of EMI) and seven for Pathé. Issued between 1901 and 1908, many of them duplicate (or even triplicate) the same favourite pieces, meaning that he actually recorded only 16 arias and five songs. As the duplications were issued, earlier versions were deleted, so that some of these items are now, over 100 years later, exquisitely rare. With one exception, everything is sung in French. There are no duets or ensembles. Regrettably, arias from many of his most celebrated operatic roles were not committed to disc; but what he did record is sufficient to demonstrate his greatness as a singer and interpretive artist.

=== Reissues on modern format ===
- The Complete Gramophone Recordings 1901 - 1908 [plus one Pathé issue] Marston
- The Baritones Vol. I - 'The French School Symposium
- The Harold Wayne Collection Vol. 8 Symposium
- Souvenirs of Rare French Operas IRCC
- Reyer - Sigurd: Excerpts by Various Artists Malibran
- Covent Garden on Record Vol. I 1870 - 1904 Pearl

== Appreciation ==
Maurice Renaud was a handsome man, trim and erect, with regular features, deep-set eyes, wavey chestnut-coloured locks and a magisterial handlebar mustache that completed the picture of virile magnetism. He was a fine figure of a singer, a convincing actor on stage, praised by all the most exacting critics on two continents.

He was very much a baryton-noble in the tradition of such legendary Paris Opéra singers as Jean-Baptiste Faure (painted so masterfully by Degas) and Jean Lassalle. His voice was a luxury item of great beauty and almost ideal richness and weight for any rôle in the French operatic repertory. To Italian and German parts he brought an elegance and nobility nurtured in the school of dramatic declamation of the Académie nationale de musique, related to that of the Comédie Française and the whole historic conception of tragic and heroic performance in French literary theater.

He was also a first-rate bel canto master, utterly accomplished in matters of vocal production and breathing. This combination of declamatory and vocal command gave his singing a unique authority and brilliance. It can be stated with confidence that very, very few artists have stood on his level. As the noted New York critic Henry Krehbiel wrote: "Where Renaud sits, there is the head of the table."
