= Die schöne Lurette =

1960 film

- Directed by: Gottfried Kolditz
- Written by: Édouard Blau (libretto); Ernest Blum (libretto); Raoul Toché (libretto)
- Release date: 1960
- Country: East Germany
- Language: German

Die schöne Lurette is an East German film. It is an adaptation of the opéra comique Belle Lurette] by Jacques Offenbach. It was released in 1960, and sold 3,267,070 tickets.
