= Alfred Blau =

Alfred Blau (born Blois, 29 May 1827, died Brussels, 23 February 1896) was a French dramatist and opera librettist. He was a cousin of Édouard Blau, another French librettist of the same period.

Although born in Blois, he became "one of the most Parisians of the Parisians of Paris", although this only extended to the right bank of the city. He had trained in law and taken on a few cases but went to Paris aged 22 and soon became a part of the group of Murger, Schanne and Champfleury.

In the literary world he was known by the anagrammatic pen-name Baül. In addition to the libretti listed below, in late 1887 he was in discussions with Emmanuel Chabrier for a libretto on the subject of The Tempest by Shakespeare, but the project came to nothing.

Blau was a member of the Académie of Blois (despite believing such institutions to be redundant), and was nominated chevalier de la Légion d'honneur in 1894, two years before his death in Brussels.

== Operas to librettos by Alfred Blau ==
- Jules Duprato

Le Chanteur florentin with Édouard Blau, (1866)

- Ernest Reyer

Sigurd with Camille du Locle (1884)

- Jules Massenet

Esclarmonde with Louis de Gramont (1889)
