= Alfred Jolly =

French singer and actor

As Hérisson de Porc Epic in Chabrier's L'étoile (1877)

Alfred-Jules Jolly (20 April 1839 – 8 May 1891) was a French singer and actor. In the first part of his career he featured in operettas in Brussels and later in Paris, creating roles in works by Lecocq, Hervé and Offenbach, among others. From 1884 he switched to the non-musical theatre, based at the Théâtre du Vaudeville, starring in comedies and farces.

== Life and career ==
Jolly was born in Paris on 20 April 1839. He dabbled in several professions before entering the theatre. He made his debut in Belgium and then moved to Paris in 1866, returning to Brussels during the Franco-Prussian War of 1870–71. In Brussels he was in three world premieres of operettas by Charles Lecocq: as Sir Jonathan Plupersonn in Les cent vierges (1872), Pomponnet in La fille de Madame Angot (1872) and Boléro d'Akarazar in Giroflé-Girofla (1874).

He moved permanently to Paris in 1876, and established himself at the Bouffes-Parisiens, and then at the Théâtre de la Renaissance. In those two theatres he created roles in many comic operas including Hérisson de Porc Epic in Chabrier's L'étoile (1877), the Governor in Charles Grisart's Le Pont d'Avignon (1878), the Marquis de rues in Hervé's La marquise des rues (1879), Grippeminaud in Hervé's Panurge (1879), Malicorne in Offenbach's Belle Lurette (1880), Chateauminet in Lecocq's Janot (1881), and Prince Cornikoff in Hervé's Le vertigo (1883).

Jolly c. 1873

In 1884 Jolly abandoned the musical stage and moved to the Théâtre du Vaudeville. He was seen there as Duplantin opposite Réjane in Edmond Gondinet's Clara Soleil, and in the leading comic roles in La veuve de Damoclès (1886), Le conseil judiciaire (1886), Les surprises du divorce (1888), La sécurité des familles (1888) and Feu Toupinel (1890). His last role was Montgodin in the farce Madame Montgodin by Ernest Blum and Raoul Toché. Les Annales du théâtre et de la musique said of his performance, "You had to see Jolly – Jolly was the whole play … Jolly, bewildered. Jolly absolutely priceless."

Jolly's career was cut short by illness, and he died in Paris on 8 May 1891, aged 52. The Paris correspondent of The Era wrote of him:

He had become, in fact, one of the most finished comic actors in Paris, and one of the most popular at the same time. His remarkable talent will be missed from our stage, and especially at the Vaudeville, which remained closed the night of his funeral. M. Jolly, who was an excellent comrade, was highly esteemed in the profession.

Le Figaro said:

Jolly died at the age of fifty-two, when his talent was fully developed and authors and the public believed they could count on this precious artist for a long time to come. He leaves, among the plethora of comic actors in Paris, a void that will be difficult to fill.

== Sources ==
- Gänzl, Kurt; Andrew Lamb (1988). Gänzl's Book of the Musical Theatre. London: The Bodley Head. ISBN 978-0-370-31157-9.
- Noël, Édouard; Edmond Stoullig (1878). Les Annales du théâtre et de la musique, 1877 (in French). Paris: Charpentier. OCLC 1178149116.

- —; — (1879). Les Annales du théâtre et de la musique, 1878 (in French). Paris: Charpentier. OCLC 1178149116.
- —; — (1880). Les Annales du théâtre et de la musique, 1879 (in French). Paris: Charpentier. OCLC 1178149116.
- —; — (1881). Les Annales du théâtre et de la musique, 1880 (in French). Paris: Charpentier. OCLC 1178149116.
- —; — (1882). Les Annales du théâtre et de la musique, 1881 (in French). Paris: Charpentier. OCLC 1178149116.
- —; — (1885). Les Annales du théâtre et de la musique, 1884 (in French). Paris: Charpentier. OCLC 1178149116.
- —; — (1891). Les Annales du théâtre et de la musique, 1890 (in French). Paris: Charpentier. OCLC 1178149116.
