= Belle Lurette =

Opéra comique by Jacques Offenbach

Belle Lurette and scenes from the opera

Belle Lurette is a three-act opéra comique with music by Jacques Offenbach and words by Ernest Blum, Edouard Blau and Raoul Toché. It was first performed at the Théâtre de la Renaissance, Paris, on 30 October 1880. The composer died before the orchestration of the score was finished, and Léo Delibes completed it.

The opera depicts the romantic affairs of a beautiful Parisian laundress, known as "Belle Lurette", (Note: "Il y a belle lurette" is an old colloquial expression meaning "a long time ago" or "for ages") and the entanglements of those around her.

== Background ==
Offenbach's career had been severely disrupted by the downfall in 1870 of the Second Empire, with which he had been closely linked. By the end of the decade he had substantially restored his earlier status as a composer of popular comic operas. His last completed such work, La fille du tambour-major (1879), ran for more than 240 performances, at a time when a run of 100 performances was considered a success.

In the early 1870s Offenbach had been temporarily eclipsed by a younger rival, Charles Lecocq, who was associated with the Théâtre de la Renaissance, but by the end of the decade Lecocq's works began to find less favour among the public, and in 1880 Offenbach was delighted to accept an invitation from Victor Koning, director of the Renaissance, to write a piece for the theatre. He withdrew from Paris to Saint-Germain-en-Laye to work on the new piece and on his ambitious opera The Tales of Hoffmann. He returned to Paris in September to supervise early rehearsals of the latter at the Opéra-Comique. His already precarious health took a turn for the worse and he died in his sleep on 5 October. Offenbach's friend and former protégé Léo Delibes undertook the remaining orchestration of the score.

The work opened at the Renaissance on 30 November 1880 and ran for 82 performances, closing on 11 January 1881.

=== Original cast ===
- Malicorne – Alfred Jolly
- Campistrel – Eugène Vauthier
- Le duc de Marly – M. Cooper
- Merluchet – M. Lary
- Cigogne – M. Jannin
- Belhomme – M. Alexandre
- La Boisene – M. William
- Givry – M. Liberg
- Lenoncourt – M. Deberg
- Cadignan – M. Duchosal
- Baptiste – M. Perrenot
- Jasmin – M. Robillot
- Lafleur – M. Mercier
- Belle Lurette – Jane Hading
- Marceline – Mily-Meyer
- Friquette – Mlle Norette
- Clorinde – Lydie Borel
- Toinette – Mlle Panseron
- Manon – Mlle Rolla
- Rose – Mlle Davenay
- Madelon – Mlle Ducouret
- Bérénice – Mlle Doriani
- Nicole – Mlle Roger
- Jacqueline – Mlle Jouvenceau
- Marion – Mlle Bérette

A note in the published vocal score indicates that the rôle of the Duke of Marly may be played by a woman en travesti, as was done when the piece was first seen in Brussels, a few weeks after the Paris premiere.

== Musical numbers ==
Mily-Meyer as Marceline, 1880

- Act 1

- Overture
- Chorus – Pan! Pan! Pan! Pan!
- Chanson du jabot – Le jabot du colonel (The colonel's jabot) – Belhomme
- Trio – Nous sommes les trois amoureux (We are three lovers) – Merluchel, Cigogne, Campistrel
- Chorus of the laundresses – Cherchons donc a l'instant même (Let's seize the moment)
- Couplets de la statistique – Oui, je l'avoue avec fierté (Yes, I admit it with pride) – Malicorne
- Rondeau – Chez une baronne (At a Baronness's) – Lurette
- March and Chorus – Nous avons pris à qui mieux mieux (We are more and more taken)
- Chorus – Ta ra ta ta
- Rondo – Belle Lurette a des beaux yeux (Belle Lurette has beautiful eyes) Campistrel
- Ensemble – Hm! Quelle odeur délicieuse (Hm! What a delicious smell)
- Romance – Faut-il ainsi nous maudire (Should we so curse ourselves) – Lurette
- Finale – D'abord on doit battre (First we have to win)

- Act 2

- Entr'acte
- Chorus – Chantons au nom de l'amitié (Singing in the name of friendship) –
- Romance – Bouquets flétris (Wilted bouquets) – Le Duc, Choruss
- Couplets – Ce fut à Londres que mon père (It was in London that my father) – Marceline, Malicorne
- Ensemble and romance – Nous amenons la fiancée (We bring the bride)
- Duo – Je m'en vais leste par la ville (I'm going away to the city) – Lurette, Le Duc
- Chorus – Salut! Hommage aux époux! (Hail! Homage to the spouses!)
- Rondo and ensemble – Colett' sur le lavoir (Colett' from the laundry)
- Finale – Vous appelez? (Are you calling?)

- Acte 3

- Entr'acte
- Chorus – Vite, amusons-nous! (Quick, let's have fun!)
- Rondeau – Oui. Cette étrange aventure (Yes. This a strange adventure) – Campistrel
- Couplets – C'était le soir (It was evening) – Marceline
- Chorus – Vive ta reine du lavoir! (Long live the queen of the laundry!)
- Couplets – Amis suivant nos vieill's coutumes (Friends, following our old customs) Lurette
- Scene – He là-bas! (Hey! Down there!)
- Couplets – On s'amuse, on applaudit (We have fun, we applaud) – Lurette
- Couplet finale – Colett' sous le lavoir (Colett' from the laundry)

== Plot ==
=== Act 1 ===
The action, set in Paris during the reign of Louis XV, begins in a laundry owned by the formidable Marceline. Soldiers, led by Belhomme, come to fetch their colonel's lace jabot. The laundresses flirt with the soldiers, whom Marceline turns out. One of the laundresses, the beautiful Belle Lurette, has a trio of would-be lovers, the singer Campistrel, the poet Merluchet and the painter Cigogne, but she fends off all three. She tells fortunes, and tells her own with playing cards, which she says predict an imminent wedding for her. Marceline warns her girls of the need for laundresses to be on their guard against predatory male customers, having in her younger days been compromised by one. While Marceline is away from the premises the laundresses have an impromptu lunch with the returning soldiers. Malicorne, servant of the Duke of Marly, comes to invite Belle Lurette to marry the Duke, who, he says, has fallen in love with her at first sight. After a brief hesitation she accepts, trusting the prediction of the cards.

=== Act 2 ===
The act is set in the grand town house of the Duke of Marly. He dines with dancers from the Opéra and says goodbye to his past love life by burning strands of hair, portraits, letters and ribbons he has kept as mementos. He needs to marry urgently to comply with the terms of a large financial bequest, and intends to abandon his bride after the wedding and send her to live in the country. Belle Lurette arrives, escorted by all her friends. People dance and sing, and the duke then goes through the motions of wooing his bride-to-be. The couple go out to formalise their union in the duke's private chapel. But when Belle Lurette expects to be alone with the duke, she is confronted by Malicorne who tries to force her to retire to the provinces, far from her husband, who has slipped away quietly. She realises she has been duped. The intervention of the Belhomme patrol allows her to gain her freedom.

=== Act 3 ===
It is Mi-Carême (the middle day of Lent), the occasion for the traditional Parisian carnival of the laundresses. All the protagonists meet by moonlight at Meudon, on the banks of the Seine. Belle Lurette is the "queen of the laundry" and appears on a float in the procession. Together with her three admirers, she performs a commedia dell'arte routine. The duke appears, offended to see his wife exhibiting herself in this way. On discovering that it was she who once saved his life by standing in the freezing cold and dark to intercept him and warn him of an assassination attempt, he finds his feelings for her transformed, and he asks her to be his wife in reality as well as in name. Meanwhile, Marceline has recognised Malicorne as the man who seduced her years earlier; he makes amends by proposing marriage; she accepts.

== Later productions ==
The work was given in Brussels in December 1880, in London in July 1881, and in Vienna (as Die schöne Lurette) in May 1890. The London production was given in French by the Renaissance company, with the same performers in the main roles with the exception of the title role, sung in London by Jeanne Granier. An English version, adapted by Frank Desprez and others opened in March 1883 as Lurette, with Florence St John, Lottie Venne and Henry Bracy in the leading roles. The piece was twice adapted for the cinema in East Germany, with alterations to the original plot to point up the class conflict between the ruling élite and the proletariat. A new English version was presented by New Sussex Opera in 2021, and toured in 2022.

== Notes, references and sources ==
=== Sources ===
- Esteban, Manuel (1983). Georges Feydeau. Boston: Twain. ISBN 978-0-8057-6551-9.
- Gammond, Peter (1980). Offenbach. London: Omnibus Press. ISBN 978-0-7119-0257-2.
- Noël, Édouard; Edmond Stoullig (1881). Les Annales du théâtre et de la musique, 1880 (in French). Paris: Charpentier. OCLC 777138803.
- Noël, Édouard; Edmond Stoullig (1882). Les Annales du théâtre et de la musique, 1881 (in French). Paris: Charpentier. OCLC 777138803.
- Yon, Jean-Claude (2000). Jacques Offenbach (in French). Paris: Gallimard. ISBN 978-2-07-074775-7.
