= Edmond Vergnet =

French operatic tenor (1850–1904)

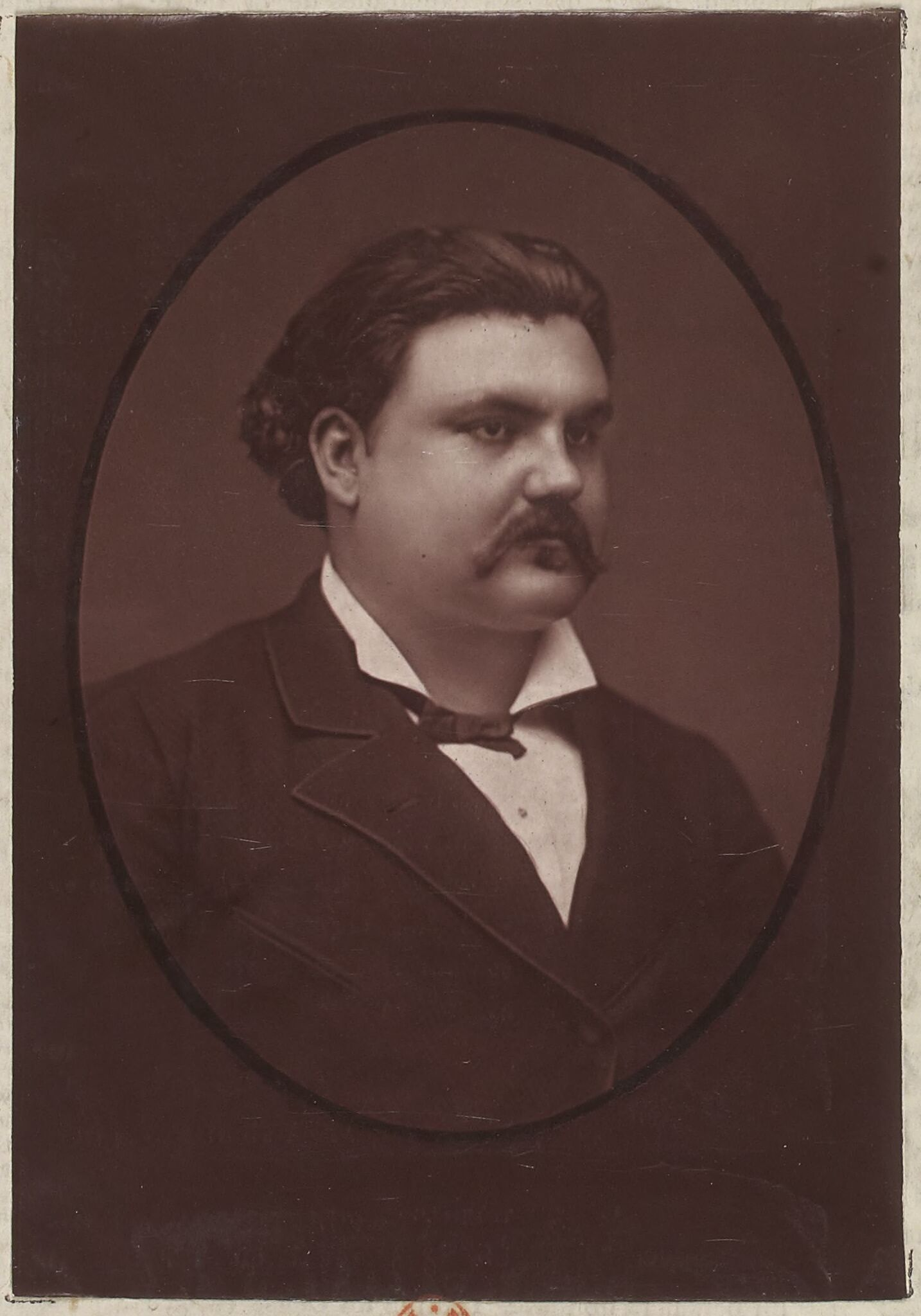
Image of Edmond Vergnet

Edmond-Alphonse Vergnet (French: [ɛdmɔ̃ vɛʁɲɛ]; 4 July 1850, Montpellier-d 24 February 1904, Nice) was a French operatic tenor.

== Biography ==
Vergnet studied singing in Paris before making his professional opera début at the Paris Opéra in 1874 as Raimbaut in Giacomo Meyerbeer's Robert le diable. He continued to sing leading tenor roles for that company for many years including the title role in Charles Gounod's Faust, Léopold in Fromental Halévy's La Juive, Ruodi in Gioachino Rossini's Guillaume Tell, Laertes in Ambroise Thomas's Hamlet, Don Ottavio in Wolfgang Amadeus Mozart's Don Giovanni, Fernand in Donizetti's La favorite, Max in Carl Maria von Weber's Der Freischütz, Alim in Jules Massenet’s Le roi de Lahore, John of Leyden in Giacomo Meyerbeer's Le prophète, Vasco da Gama in Meyerbeer's L'Africaine, Samson in Camille Saint-Saëns's Samson et Dalila and the title role in Richard Wagner's Lohengrin.

At the Théâtre de la Monnaie in Brussels, Vergnet portrayed John the Baptist in the world premiere of Massenet's Hérodiade (1881) and Shahabarim in Ernest Reyer’s Salammbô (1890). He sang at the Royal Opera House, Covent Garden (1881–2) as Radames, Faust, Belmonte and Wilhelm Meister. In 1883 he created Admetus in Alfredo Catalani’s Dejanice at La Scala. At the Opéra de Monte-Carlo (1884–9) he sang Riccardo in Giuseppe Verdi's Un ballo in maschera, the title role in Fra Diavolo, Raoul de Nangis in Les Huguenots, Edgardo in Donizetti's Lucia di Lammermoor, the Duke of Mantua in Verdi's Rigoletto, Gérald in Léo Delibes's Lakmé, and Florestan in Beethoven's Fidelio. He also sang Zarastra in the world premiere of Massenet's Le mage (1891) and Dominique in the world premiere of Alfred Bruneau’s L'attaque du moulin at the Opéra-Comique (1894).
