= Salammbô (Reyer) =

Opera by Ernest Reyer

- Opera by Ernest Reyer
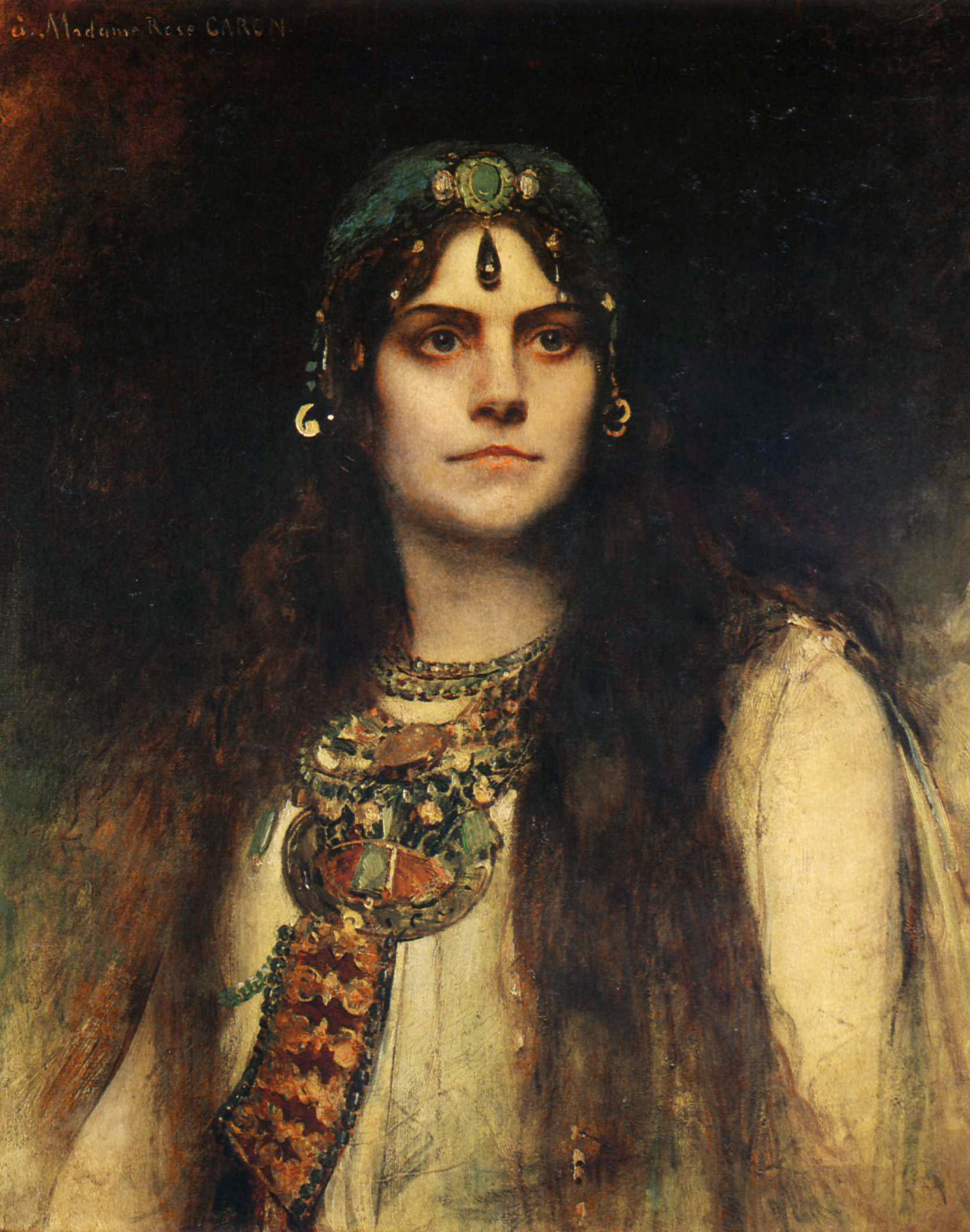
- Rose Caron in the title role, after a portrait by Léon Bonnat
- Librettist: Camille du Locle
- Language: French
- Based on: Gustave Flaubert's Salammbô
- Premiere: 10 February 1890; Théatre de la Monnaie, Brussels

Salammbô is an opera in five acts composed by Ernest Reyer to a French libretto by Camille du Locle. It is based on the novel of the same title by Gustave Flaubert (1862). Initially refused by Paris, Reyer's opera enjoyed its first performance at the Théâtre Royal de la Monnaie in Brussels, on 10 February 1890, with sets designed by Pierre Devis and Armand Lynen. The Parisian premiere at the Palais Garnier took place on 16 May 1892 with costumes by Eugène Lacoste and sets by Eugène Carpezat (Acts I and V), Auguste Alfred Rubé and Philippe Chaperon (Act II), and Amable and Eugène Gardy (Act IV).

The American premiere was at the French Opera House in New Orleans on 25 January 1900 with Lina Pacary in the title role. It was first performed in New York at the 'old' Metropolitan Opera House on 20 March 1901, with Lucienne Bréval in the title role, Albert Saléza, Eustase Thomas-Salignac, Marcel Journet, Charles Gillibert, Eugène Dufriche, and Antonio Scotti with Luigi Mancinelli conducting.

Portions of the opera were performed in 1906 in the ancient Roman Carthage amphitheatre during an event sponsored by the Carthage Institute, making it among the first pieces formally staged there since the structure was destroyed by the Vandals in AD 439.

This rarely nowadays performed opera received the last performance at the Paris Opera in 1943, and the most recent one in Marseilles on 27 September 2008, in commemoration of the 100th anniversary of Reyer's death.

== Roles ==
Role	Voice type	Premiere Cast, (Conductor: Edouard Bärwolf)
Hamilcar, Carthaginian leader	baritone	Maurice Renaud
Salammbô, a priestess, Hamilcar's daughter	soprano	Rose Caron
Taanach, Salammbo's servant	mezzo-soprano	Anna Wolff
Shahabarim, high priest of Tanit	tenor	Edmond Vergnet
Narr'Havas, King of Numidia	bass	Sentein
Giscon, Carthaginian general	bass	Edmond Peeters
Mathô, chief Libyan mercenary	tenor	Henri Sellier
Spendius, Greek slave	baritone	Max Bouvet
Autharite, Gaulish mercenary	bass	Challet

== Setting ==
- Place: Carthage
- Time: 240 BC

== Other opera adaptations ==
In 1863, Modest Mussorgsky also started writing text and music for an opera based on Flaubert's novel, but he never managed to complete the work. Other versions were written by V. Fornari (1881), Niccolò Massa (1886), Eugeniusz Morawski-Dąbrowa, Josef Matthias Hauer (1930), Alfredo Cuscinà (1931), Veselin Stoyanov (1940) and Franco Casavola (1948). Contemporary French composer Philippe Fénélon's Salammbô was first performed at the Opéra Bastille in 1998.

== See also ==
- La statue, 1861 opera by Reyer
- Sigurd, 1884 opera by Reyer
