= Albert Saléza =

French opera singer (1867–1916)

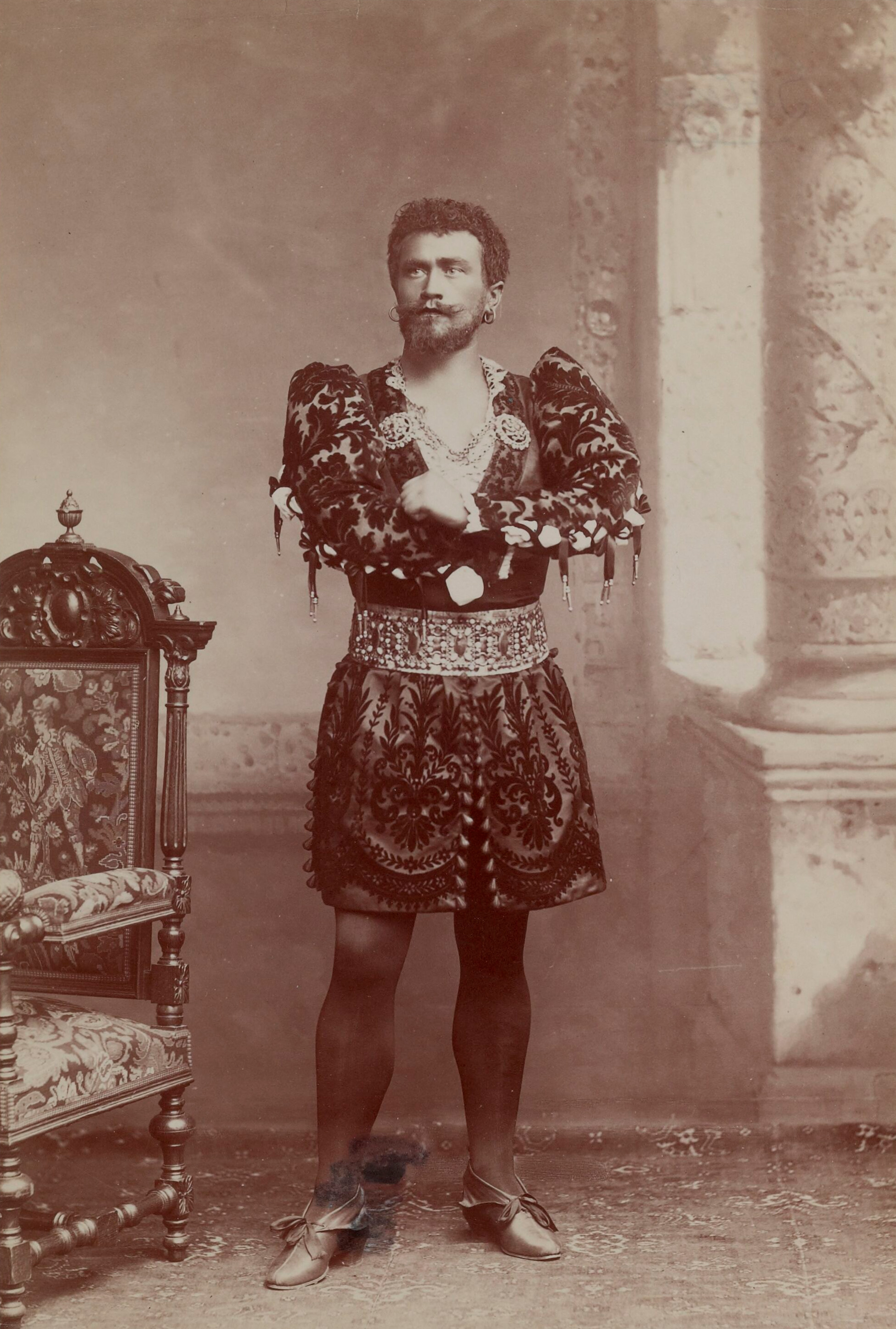
- Albert Saléza as Otello
- Born: 18 October 1867; Bruges, France
- Died: 26 November 1916 (aged 49); Paris
- Education: Conservatoire de Paris
- Occupations: Opera singer; Tenor

Albert Saléza (18 October 1867 – 26 November 1916) was a French tenor.

== Biography ==
Born in Bruges in Basses-Pyrénées, last child of a large family of 12 children, and, as an orphan from the age of 8 years old, Saléza was sent to a Girondine property of senator Auguste Calvet where he became an assistant shepherd. But the country sickness forced him to return to his native commune where he became a sandal worker. Difficulty feeding led him to accept a job as a gravel digger on the Pau-Laruns railway, then as a sandaler in Bayonne, where wages were higher.

At his places of work, his voice was noticed by two Basque music lovers, who introduced him to the director of the music school, Mr. Jubin, and then to his first teacher, Gaston Salzedo. With this one, Saléza, who had hitherto received only a basic education, made rapid progress in all fields: instruction, diction, singing, music... so much so that he won the First prize of the school in 1886, which allowed him to integrate the Conservatoire de Paris where he won again the first prize in singing and the second prize in opera before a jury composed notably of Léo Delibes and Ambroise Thomas.

On leaving the conservatory, because of his fragile health, he chose the Opéra-Comique instead of the Opera which would have been too demanding so quickly. From his first role, Mylio in Le roi d'Ys, his performance aroused the enthusiasm of the audience at the Salle Favart. From the Opéra-Comique, Albert Saléza moved on to the Opéra de Nice where he recovered his strength. He gained further renown by interpreting Faust, Roméo et Juliette, Carmen, Richard III...

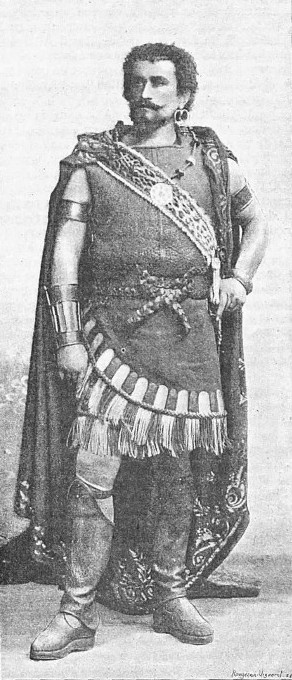
Albert Saléza in Salammbô by Benque & cie.

In 1892, Ernest Reyer noticed him and offered him the consecration by giving him a role tailored to his needs at the Paris Opera: Matho in Salammbô. The triumph he obtained allowed him to repeat success after success: Le Cid, Die Walküre, la Damnation de Faust His fame was so great that Verdi offered him the role of Otello that he performed 35 times until May 1895.

Unfortunately, health problems hit his vocal chords and forced him to stop for 2 years. In 1897, Saléza returned to the Opéra de Paris, then, in Monte Carlo, Brussels and Covent Garden of London where he sang in particular in Carmen with Emma Calvé, and Roméo et Juliette with Nellie Melba, and very often in front of the future king Edward VII. He reached the pinnacle of his glory in Chicago and the Metropolitan of New York, thanks to his interpretations in Faust, Lucia di Lammermoor, Les Huguenots…

In 1912, after all these successes abroad, he returned to France and was appointed professor of lyric declamation at the Conservatoire where his results turned out to be excellent with students who won all the first prizes. But on 26 November 1916, this new career came to a sudden halt when he collapsed during a mass in the église Saint-Charles-de-Monceau.

Saléza married in 1895 to Pauline Bonnecarrère (1875–1953) and had three children: Mylio (1896–1957), Madeleine (1899–1913), and José (1905–?). He died on 26 November 1916 in the 17th arrondissement of Paris.

== Legacy ==
An Albert Saléza fund was created from 21 handwritten notebooks relating the career of the French tenor, excerpts from press articles and photographs, all from the collection of Mylio Saléza (for photographs) and his wife Marie-Louise, who kept the memory of her father-in-law until her death in 1995.

== Sources ==
- Albert Saléza dans Théodore Baker: Biographical Dictionary of Musicians (page 806)
- Biographie d'Albert Saléza pour le fonds Saléza
