= Édouard Blau =

French dramatist and opera librettist

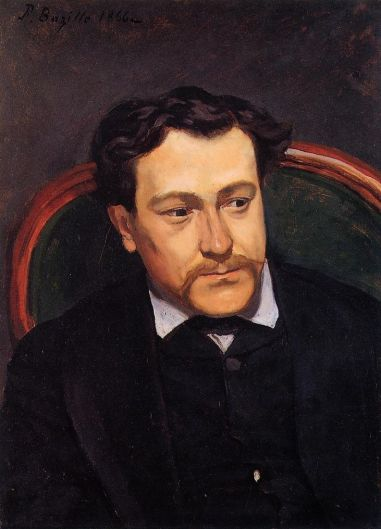
Frédéric Bazille: Portrait of Édouard Blau (1870).

Édouard Blau (30 May 1836 – 7 January 1906) was a French dramatist and opera librettist. He was a cousin of Alfred Blau, another librettist of the same period.

Going to Paris at the age of 20, he worked at the Assistance Publique but from 1870 concentrated on theatrical writing. For his libretti, he collaborated with Louis Gallet, Alfred Blau, Camille du Locle and Louis de Gramont.

== Operas to librettos by Édouard Blau ==
- Georges Bizet
  - La Coupe du roi de Thulé (1868–69)
  - Don Rodrigue (1873)
- Jacques Offenbach
  - La Marocaine (1879)
  - Belle Lurette (1880)
- Benjamin Godard
  - Dante (1890)
- Jules Massenet
  - Le Cid (1885)
  - Werther (1892)
- Édouard Lalo
  - Le roi d'Ys (1888)
