= Ella J. Bradley-Hughley =

American opera singer

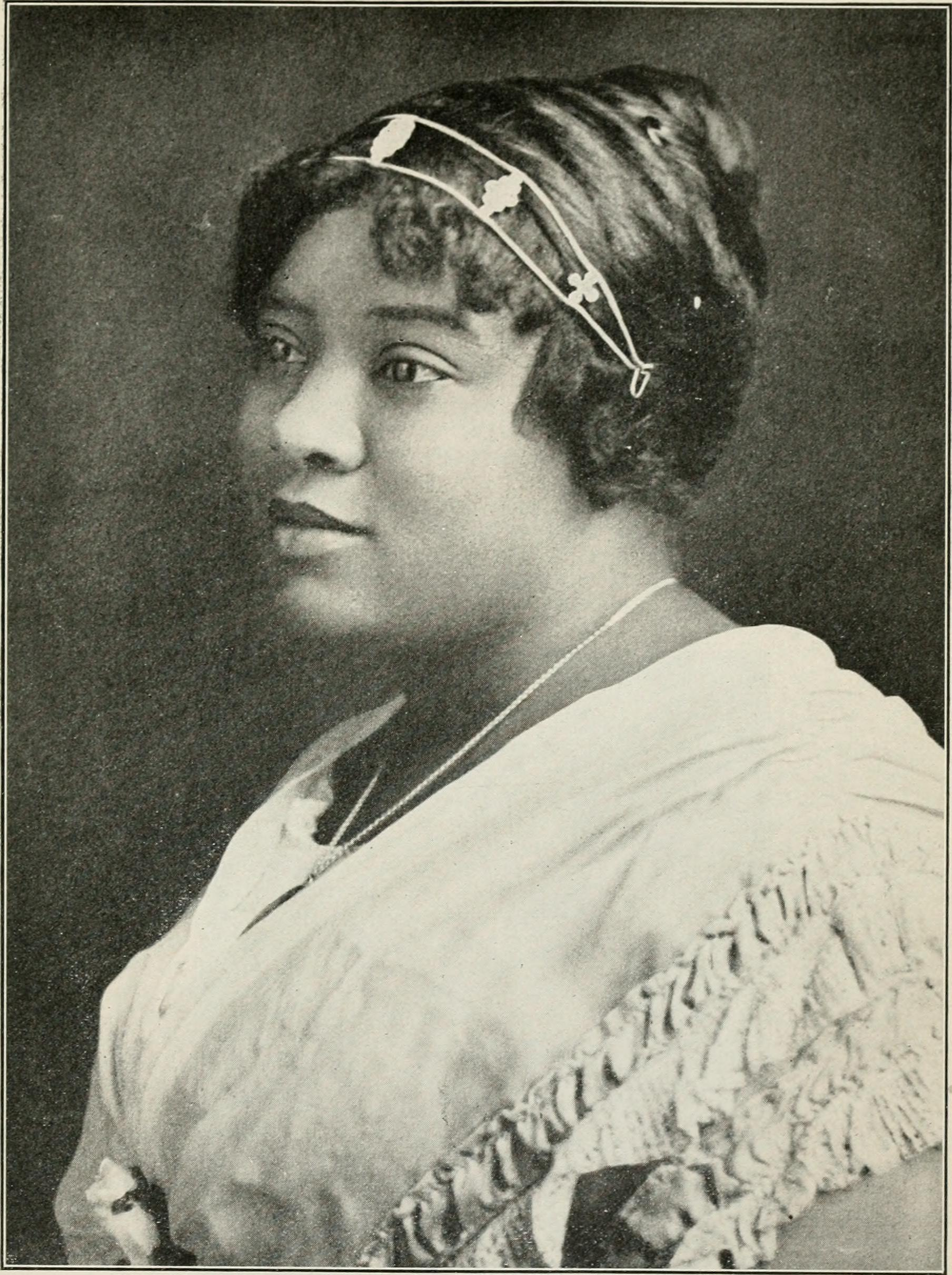
Ella J. Bradley-Hughley

Ella J. Bradley-Hughley (1889–1918) was an American choir director, and concert soprano. She was well known and active in Los Angeles between 1911 until 1918, where she was given the nickname the "Queen of Song".

== Biography ==
She was born as Ella J. Bradley on March 1, 1889, in Dallas, Texas, to a Black Christian family. She attended Bishop College in Marshall, Texas and graduated in 1907. In 1911, she married David H. Hughley in Dallas, and together they moved to Los Angeles, California shortly after marriage. In Los Angeles she studied with Armenian gospel singer, J. Jurakian; George H. Carr; and with Spanish operatic singer, Florencio Constantino.

Her first performance in Los Angeles was presented by Reverend J. T. Hill at the Wesley Chapel. She served as the department head of voice-culture department at the Wilkins Conservatory of Music (also known as the Wilkins Piano Academy), founded by William Wilkins.

She died in February 1918.
