= Sigurd (opera) =

Opera by Ernest Reyer

- Opera by Ernest Reyer
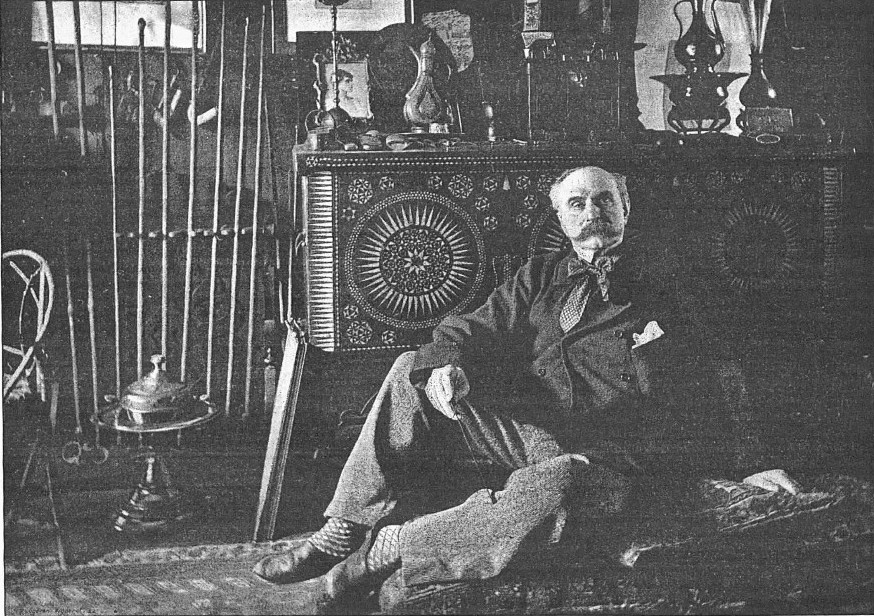
- The composer in 1893
- Librettist: Camille du Locle; Alfred Blau
- Language: French
- Based on: Nibelungenlied
- Premiere: 7 January 1884; Théatre de la Monnaie, Brussels

Sigurd is an opera in four acts and nine scenes by the French composer Ernest Reyer on a libretto by Camille du Locle and Alfred Blau. Like Wagner's Ring of the Nibelung, the story is based on the Nibelungenlied and the Eddas, with some crucial differences from the better known Wagnerian version (the role of the supernatural is limited and replaced in large part by fate; the initial version of the libretto with a prologue set in heaven was later cut out). The whole opera can best be described as an epic with techniques of the grand opera.

Initially sketched out in 1862 (and virtually completed in draft by 1867), the work waited many years before it was performed in full. Orchestration of various fragments progressed much more slowly, and as they were completed, they were sometimes performed at various concerts. Initial attempts at staging the work at the Paris Opéra failed, therefore the opera had its world premiere in the Théatre de la Monnaie in Brussels on 7 January 1884 (directed by Alexandre Lapissida). Within a year it was also performed with great success at the Royal Opera House, Covent Garden; Lyon, Monte Carlo and, finally, at the Paris Opéra on 12 June 1885, (directed there by Raoul Lapissida).

In America, the opera was first performed on 24 December 1891 at the French Opera House in New Orleans, and the Teatro alla Scala in Milan performed it in 1894. Since then it has had periodic revivals (but only in France or Monaco); then, after World War II, it was staged in 1963 and 1995 at the Opéra de Marseille (the last one with Alberto Cupido in the title role). It will be given again in Marseille in April 2025. The opera was also performed in 1973 in concert at studio 104 of the Office de Radiodiffusion Télévision Française (ORTF) in Paris (Manuel Rosenthal was conducting; (the performance was recorded) and in 1993 at Festival de Radio France et Montpellier.

== Roles ==
Roles, voice types, premiere cast
Role	Voice type	Premiere cast, 7 January 1884 Conductor: Joseph Dupont
Sigurd, Frankish hero	tenor	Julien Jourdain
Gunther, king of the Burgundians	baritone	Maurice Devriès
Hagen, warrior, companion of Gunther	bass	Léon-Pierre Gresse
Brunehild, Queen of Iceland	soprano	Rose Caron
Hilda, Gunther's sister	mezzo-soprano	Rosa Bosman
Uta, Hilda's nurse	contralto	Blanche Deschamps-Jéhin
The high priest of Odin	baritone	Maurice Renaud
Rudiger	baritone	M. Boussa
Irnfrid	tenor	Jean Goffoël
Hawart	baritone	Mansuède
Ramunc	bass	Stalport
The bard	bass	
Burgundian warriors, Burgundian people, Icelandic people, Priests, Wives of Burgundian warriors, Maids to Hilda and the Queen, Valets, envoys of Attila, etc.

In the ballets:

- Act 2: The three Norns, Valkyries, Nixes, Elves, Kobolds
- Act 3: Divertissement: Dances without Warriors

== Instrumentation ==
- 1 piccolo, 2 flutes, 2 oboes, 1 cor anglais, 2 clarinets, 4 bassoons
- 4 French horns, 2 trumpets, 2 cornets, 3 trombones, 1 tuba
- timpani, percussion, 2 harps, string section
- stage band

== Synopsis ==
Place: Worms and Iceland
Time: 5th century, time of Attila

Hilda, the younger sister of Gunther, king of the Burgundians, loves the hero Sigurd, despite the fact that she was expected to be given to Attila himself as a bride. At the instigation of her nurse (Uta) she gives Sigurd a magic potion which brings him to her feet. Sigurd, Gunther and Hagen then swear fealty to each other and set off to Iceland, where Brunehild lies asleep upon a lofty rock, surrounded by a circle of fire and some supernatural beings. There, Sigurd, to earn the hand of Hilda, must overcome those monsters. He achieves this and passes through the flames to win Brunehild for Gunther. His face is closely hidden by his visor, and Brunehild in all innocence accepts Gunther as her saviour, and gives herself to him. The secret is afterwards disclosed by Hilda in a fit of jealous rage, whereupon Brunehild releases Sigurd from the enchantment of the potion. He recognises her as the bride ordained for him by the gods, and they sing a passionate love duet, but before he can taste his new-found happiness he is treacherously slain by Gunther while hunting. His body is brought back to the palace and Brunehild mounts the funeral pyre. A powerful apotheosis ends the opera when spirits of Sigurd and Brunehild ascend to paradise, and soldiers of Attila are seen walking over corpses of Burgundians.

== Recordings ==
- Malibran Music, Dom Disques: Compilation of various fragments of the opera, made between 1910 and 1934, with César Vezzani, Marcel Journet, Marjorie Lawrence, Germaine Lubin, and others (1 CD, 74 min.)
- Le Chant du Monde, Harmonia Mundi LDC 27891719: concert ORTF, commercial recording of Sigurd, 1973, in studio, 3 CD, total 191 min), Manuel Rosenthal conducting, with the following cast: Guy Chauvet (tenor), Robert Massard (baritone), Jules Bastin (bass), Ernest Blanc (baritone), Nicolas Christou (bass-baritone), Bernard Demigny (baritone), Jean Dupouy (tenor), Claude Méloni (baritone), Jean Louis Soumagnas, Andréa Guiot (soprano), Andrée Esposito (soprano), Denise Scharley (mezzo-soprano).
- Radio broadcast of live performance at Montpellier Festival on 6 August 1993, total 176 min, with following cast: Chris Merritt (Sigurd), Michèle Lagrange (Hilda), Valérie Millot (Brunehild), Monte Pederson (Gunther), Hélène Jossoud (Uta), Marcel Vanaud (High Priest), Alain Vernhes (Hagen), Wojtek Smilek (Barde), conducted by Günter Neuhold (the performance was taped, however never released commercially).
- Grey market DVD of telecast of live performance in Marseilles on 22 June 1995 (182 min): Alberto Cupido (Sigurd), Françoise Pollet (Brunehild), Cécile Perrin (Hilda), Jean-Philippe Lafont (Gunther), Viorica Cortez (Uta), Jean-Marc Ivaldi (High Priest), Antoine Garcin (Hagen), Dietfried Bernet conducting (never released commercially).
- Extracts: "Salut! splendeur du jour", Andréa Guiot, Germaine Lubin, Régine Crespin, Françoise Pollet

== See also ==
- La statue, 1861 opera by Reyer
- Salammbô, 1890 opera by Reyer
