= Villa Certosella =

Coordinates: 40°32′49.99″N 14°14′56.66″E

Villa Certosella is a hotel in Capri, Italy. Set along the Via Tragara, it was the home of Camille du Locle when he lived in Capri. The villa was enlarged by the illustrator Jan Styka in Italian Renaissance style. Later, Edwin Cerio requisitioned the house so that it is now part of the Ignazio Cerio estate. Cerio removed the Renaissance elements, returning the house to the casa mediterranea style. The master builder, Luigi Desiderio, worked on the property.

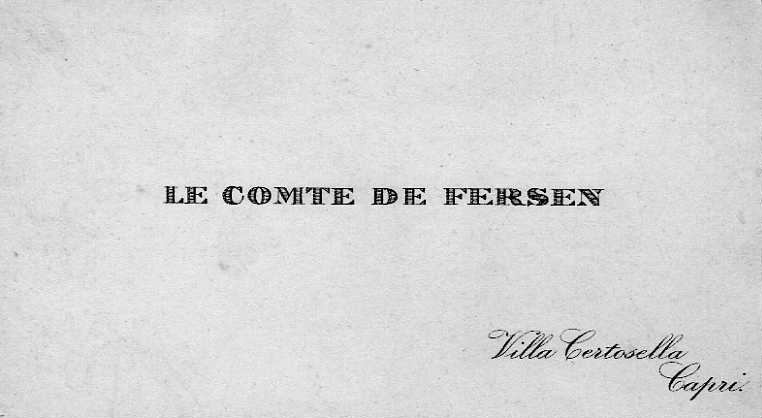
Jacques d'Adelswärd-Fersen's visiting card

Jacques d'Adelswärd-Fersen also resided at Villa Certosella before work on his Villa Lysis had been completed.

The villa is a hotel today and features notable gardens.
