= Florencio Constantino =

Spanish operatic tenor

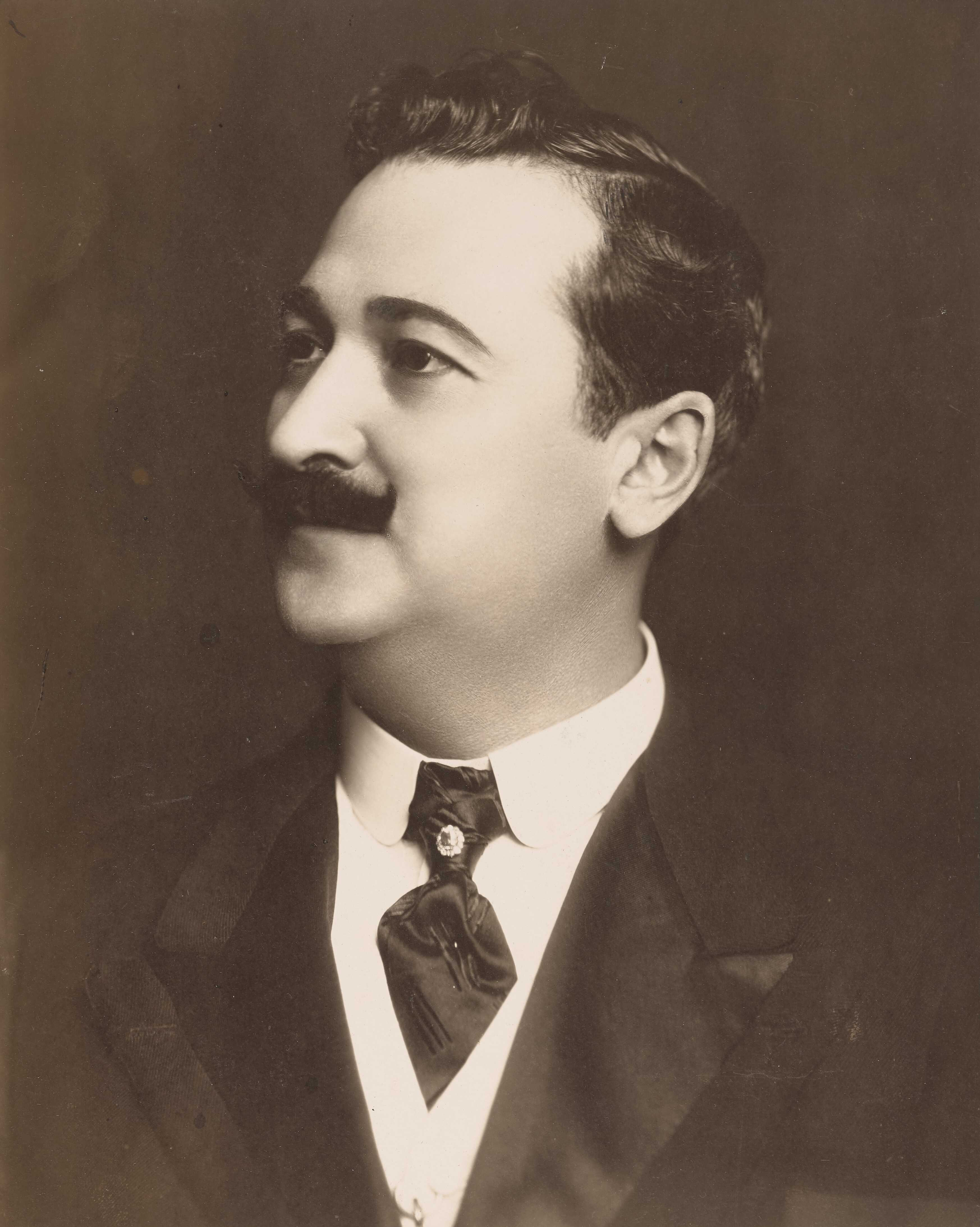
Constantino, ca. 1900–1910, by G. Moses and Son (Newberry Library, Chicago)

Florencio Constantino (April 9, 1869 – November 19, 1919) was a Spanish operatic tenor who had an active international performance career from 1892 through 1917. He was particularly admired for his performances in the operas of Giuseppe Verdi and Vincenzo Bellini; with the roles of the Duke of Mantua in Rigoletto and Arturo in I puritani being signature roles for the tenor.

Raised primarily in Argentina, Constantino began his career performing in opera houses in South America from 1892–1897 before traveling to Spain to pursue vocal training with Leopoldo Stiatesi. From 1898–1900 he appeared in leading roles in opera houses in Italy, Spain, Germany, Poland, and Russia and then resumed performing in opera houses in South America during the first years of the 20th century. He returned to Europe for a tour of Spain and Germany in 1903–1904 and then became a resident artist at the Theater des Westens in Berlin in 1904–1905.

In 1905 Constantino was committed to the Royal Opera House in London before joining English impresario Henry Russell's touring San Carlo Opera Company; a company with whom he toured the United States in 1906–1907. In 1908 he joined Oscar Hammerstein I's Manhattan Opera Company and in 1909 he became the principal tenor of the newly created Boston Opera Company; a company with whom he performed until it closed in 1915. In 1910 he made his debut with the Metropolitan Opera.

After the closing of the Boston Opera Company, Constantino moved to Los Angeles where he served as the Artistic Director of the California Grand Opera Company in 1916. In 1917 a disastrous appearance at the Saint Louis Opera led to a highly publicized lawsuit against Constantino. He left the United States for Mexico City where he suffered a mental breakdown and died at a hospital for the destitute in 1919.

== Life and career ==
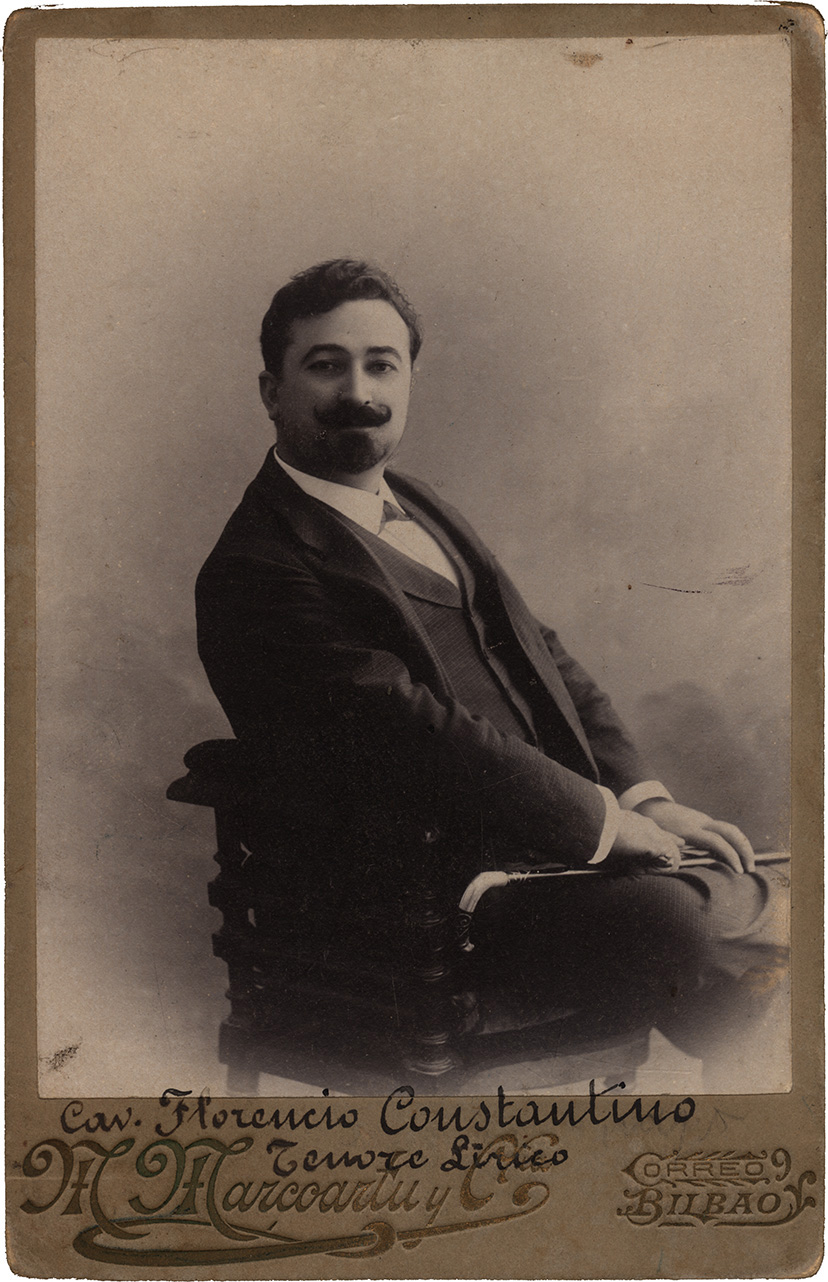
Constantino, photo by M. Marcoartu, Bilbao

Florencio Constantino was born on April 9, 1869, in Ortuella, Spain. He moved with his family to Argentina while a young child. There he began his professional life as a machinist while a teenager and then progressed to working as a ship engineer. With the assistance of a Spanish patron he obtained vocal training, and made his professional opera debut in 1889 at the Solís Theatre in Uruguay as Fernando in Gaetano Donizetti's La favorite. At that theatre he also performed the role of Lázaro in Tomás Bretón's La Dolores in 1892; a role he repeated at the Teatro Odeón in Buenos Aires later that year. In 1897 he was committed to another opera house in Buenos Aires, the Teatro Opera.

After his initial career in South America, Constantino went to Spain to pursue further vocal training with Leopoldo Stiatesi who had trained under Giovanni Battista Lamperti. He embarked on a career singing in European opera houses, achieving his first critical success as the Duke of Mantua in Giuseppe Verdi's Rigoletto at the Teatro Dal Verme in Milan in 1898. That same year he performed the role of Rodolfo in Holland's first staging of Giacomo Puccini's La bohème. In 1900 he made his debuts at the Teatro Real in Madrid, the Mariinsky Theatre in Saint Petersburg, and the Grand Theatre, Warsaw.

After this Constantino left Europe to return to South America, where he was busy performing in that continent's major opera houses during the first years of the 20th century. He returned to Europe in 1903 and had success on a concert tour of Spain and Germany in 1903–1904. He was a resident artist at the Theater des Westens in Berlin in 1904–1905 where he had critical successes as Manrico in Verdi's Il trovatore and as the Duke of Mantua.

In 1905 Constantino made his debut at Royal Opera House in London as Alfredo in La traviata with Nellie Melba as Violetta. This was followed by performances as the Duke of Mantua in Rigoletto and Don Ottavio in Mozart's Don Giovanni; both productions in which he alternated in those parts with tenor Enrico Caruso. In 1906 he was engaged by the English impresario Henry Russell for performance opposite Lillian Nordica in his touring San Carlo Opera Company (SCOC). With that company Constantino travelled to the United States, beginning his tour of that nation with the SCOC at the French Opera House in New Orleans in 1906. He returned to that theatre in 1907 to perform the role of Maurizio in the United States premiere of Francesco Cilea's Adriana Lecouvreur.

In 1908 Constantino made his New York debut at the Manhattan Opera House as the Duke of Mantua with Luisa Tetrazzini as Gilda and Mario Sammarco as Rigoletto. He had a particular triumph at that same opera house later that year as Arturo in I puritani. In 1909 he performed the role of Enzo Grimaldo in La Gioconda for the grand opening of the Boston Opera House; a performance also marking the beginning of the newly created Boston Opera Company. He continued to perform regularly with the Boston Opera Company until it closed in 1915. In 1911 his leg was injured in a stage accident involving a falling horse while performing the role of Dick Johnson in Puccini's La fanciulla del West with the Boston Opera Company. As part of the production, Constantino arrived on horseback for the scene where his character is going to his execution. During this scene the horse slipped and fell and crushed Constantino's leg. Despite the injury he finished the performance before being taken for medical treatment.

While primarily active in Boston from 1909–1915, Constantino also made appearances at other opera houses as a guest artist during this period. He performed annually at the Teatro Colón in Buenos Aires from 1909 to 1912; notably portraying Prince Sinodal in the South American premiere of Anton Rubinstein's The Demon in 1909 and the title role in that theatre's first staging of Verdi's Don Carlos in 1911. In 1910 he made his debut at the Metropolitan Opera as the Duke of Mantua to Melba's Gilda and Maurice Renaud's Rigoletto with Vittorio Podesti conducting.

After work in Boston ended, Constantino moved to Los Angeles, California, where he taught vocal lessons and served as the director at the California Temple of Arts. One of his students was Ella J. Bradley-Hughley. He was also the Artistic Director of the California Grand Opera Company for one season with whom he both directed and starred in productions of Amilcare Ponchielli's La Gioconda (as Enzo Grimaldo), Rossini's The Barber of Seville (as Count Almaviva) and Aida (as Radames) in Los Angeles in 1916.

In 1917, he was fired by the St. Louis Opera after he sang the premiere performance of Homer Moore's opera Louis XIV and clearly "did not know either the words or music". He was subsequently sued by Moore, who sought $1,200 in damages.

He had a nervous breakdown and died on November 19, 1919, in Mexico City. He died in a hospital for the poor, having been brought to that institution after being found lying ill on the street.
