= La statue =

Opera in three acts and five tableaux by Ernest Reyer

- Opera by Ernest Reyer
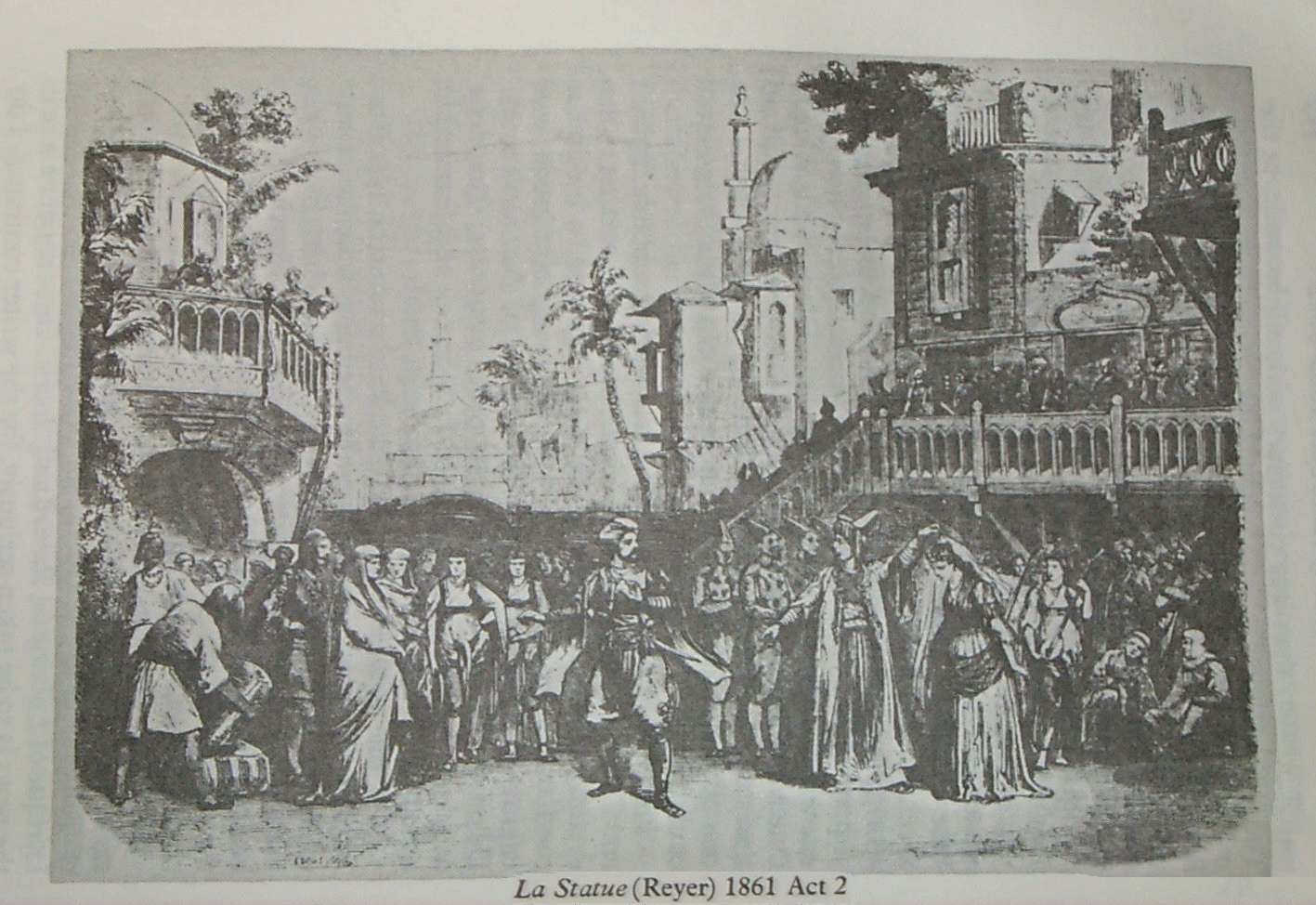
- A scene in the premiere
- Librettist: Michel Carré; Jules Barbier
- Language: French
- Premiere: 11 April 1861; Théâtre Lyrique, Paris

La statue (The Statue) is an opera in three acts and five tableaux by Ernest Reyer to the libretto by Michel Carré and Jules Barbier based on tales from One Thousand and One Nights and La statue merveilleuse, an 1810 carnival play (pièce foraine) by Alain-René Lesage and Jacques-Philippe d'Orneval.

Although in its story opera possesses a certain Oriental climate, musically it has very little resemblance to its locale, remaining in core of the French music tradition of 18th and early 19th century. It was originally conceived and performed as an opéra comique (with some spoken dialogue instead of all recitatives).

== Performance history ==
The opera received its premiere at the Théâtre Lyrique on 11 April 1861 and was very successful (Jules Massenet, who at that time himself participated in that performance (playing timpani in the orchestra), described it as "a superb score and tremendous success"). Until the year 1863 it received total of 59 performances, impressive figure for those times. It was then performed in Brussels at La Monnaie in 1865, at the Opéra-Comique in Paris in 1878, Monte Carlo in 1890 and finally in completely revised version the Paris Opéra in 1903 (at that time receiving only just 10 performances). Since that time it has slipped into total oblivion and has not been performed ever since.

== Versions ==
La statue is known to have two distinct versions. Both versions have three acts in common, but in the revised one most of the music from act 2 was substantially altered, the comic element being completely removed. Although even in original version optional first ballet was included, in later version it was substantially expanded (long second ballet was added in place of the cut vocal music: the Duo bouffe (between Kaloum and Amgiad), Margyane's Romance (or aria), and Selim's Cavatina. Pages of choral music were significantly altered or cut. Only the second part of that act, starting from Margyane's Strophes and the Finale was mostly preserved. Also, in the revised version, the Mouck's couplets from the first act and the small incidental role for Ali (the second tenor) from the second act were eliminated.

== Timing ==
Based on approximate estimate from playback of the vocal and piano reduction scores, total timing of the piece is as follows:

- Act 1 – 53 minutes
- Act 2 – 57 minutes (including ballet 37 min. in the final version for the Opéra)
- Act 2 – 47 minutes (in the original version, without ballet)
- Act 3 – 34 minutes

== Roles ==
Roles, voice types, premiere cast
Role	Voice type	Premiere cast, 11 April 1861 Conductor: Adolphe Deloffre
Margyane	soprano	Marie-Julie Baretti
Sélim	tenor	Jules-Sébastien Monjauze
Mouck	tenor	Adolphe Girardot
Amgiad	bass (or baritone)	Mathieu-Émile Balanqué
Kaloum-Barouck	baritone (or comic bass)	Émile Wartel
Ali	tenor	Jean-Blaise Martin

== Instrumentation ==
The opera is orchestrated for the following forces:

- Woodwinds: 2 flutes (incl. piccolo), 2 oboes, 2 clarinets, 2 bassoons
- Brass: 4 French horns, 4 trumpets, 4 trombones
- Timpani, percussion
- Strings, 2 harps

== Synopsis ==
=== Act 1 ===
Time: Legendary
Place: Damascus, Arabian desert

A young Arab of the town of Damascus, Sélim, very rich and very voluptuous, is bored, because he exhausted with the fortune his father left him the source of any pleasure. Now, with others, he is seen engaged in opium smoking (Choir "Ô vapeur embaumée"). Overwhelmed with languor, without illusions, and soon running out of money, Sélim is not quite sure what folly to engage next, when the mighty genie Amgiad presents himself in the form of a dervish.

He tells him first everything which he must say about the dervish who, as the rule, is doomed to poverty and wisdom, and then he adds: "the powerful genie Amgiad, the protector and friend of your family, sends me to you to tell you he has pity on thy fate. If you want a little help and follow my advice, I'll get you to the center of the earth where you will find all the riches you can imagine." He exacts then a pledge on Sélim to meet him at the certain place and hour and disappears. With these promises that excite the imagination of an Arab, Sélim comes to senses and rushes in the desert in pursuit of the chimera.

Followed by his faithful slave Mouck, Sélim arrives exhausted at the ruins of the ancient city of Baalbek. There he meets a young girl beside a fountain (duet "Mais, je veux te connaître"). The girl offers him refreshing drink, and he, after quenching his thirst, feel the natural desire to see features of the young stranger who has been so compassionate. Margyane is her name. She is poor, her mother died when she was young, and now even her father is no more, so she is on the way to join her uncle in the Holy City. The caravan is waiting. She resists his advances at first, but word by word she is overwhelmed by intimate atmosphere and his boldness and her heart slowly yields to him. On request of Sélim she shows him her smile after lifting her veil a little. He declares his love to her. They kiss. But that is too much for her at the moment. Doubting him and afraid, fighting her own passion and natural desires, she withdraw and goes away leaving confused Sélim behind.

In meantime the all watchful Amgiad appears at that same place, as it is exactly the place where they arranged previously their meeting. Once again he assures pledge from Sélim that the treasury is really all what he wants but, being a witness to the conclusion of the romantic encounter, warns him of power of love. But disappointed with his not quite successful conquest and deeply unsatisfied Sélim says he is ready and determined. By the power of his magic, Amgiad opens for him the gate to the underground kingdom and Sélim jumps there promptly to fulfill his destiny. In meantime Margyane returns and, not seeing him around anymore, disappointed ("Hélas! il n'est plus là..."), joins the caravan to her far destination.

When Sélim returns, overwhelmed and dazzled, he enthusiastically reports to his servant what he just saw:

Down there, among other wonders, stand twelve statues carved in gold and diamonds and the thirteenth pedestal empty still with the statue missing but more he looked at it the more it occurred of unparalleled richness and beauty. That thirteenth statue worth not enough of whole treasure even a king would pay will be granted to him, Sélim, if he agrees to marry an innocent and poor girl whom he will then be obliged to deliver there, pure and chaste. That promise he granted to the spirits of earth, not realizing as yet awaiting him a twist.

=== Act 2 ===
Place: Mecca

In the next act we are transported into the Holy City of Mecca, to the mansion of an old rich merchant of olives, Kaloum-Barouck, where wedding ceremony is under way. Following the advice of the "dervish," Sélim did ask to marry the niece of Kaloum-Barouck. (In the original Théâtre Lyrique version it was Mouck who came here first to ask, in the name of his master, for the hand of his niece in marriage. But violent Kaloum, who planned to marry his niece himself, welcome the messenger with sticks instead. Only by intervention of Amgiad the trouble is averted, as he arrives here as Kaloum's identical double, causes his total confusion and finally throws him out of the house, and – as Kaloum – sanctions the marriage of young lovers.)

The long and elaborate ballet scene follows. When the ceremony is concluded in the presence of the Qadi (Amgiad himself in disguise), and when at last Sélim is allowed to see the face of his wife, he recognizes her at once: Alas! The girl he met in the desert, Margyane, whom he loves and who now loves him in return! At the climax of the whole scene he, deeply and mysteriously shaken to all present, recollects suddenly, to his horror, the promise he once granted to the underground guardians that he must now fulfill under the pain of eternal punishment: to surrender his new and only love as a payment for the treasure he previously so desired. He does not dare as yet to make the full admission of his horrible situation to Margyane, however, as the act ends.

=== Act 3 ===
Place: Arabian desert

Sélim is traveling in the desert with his servant and newly wed wife, Margyane. Among violent storm (simoom), a desperate fight undertakes in the soul of Sélim between his love for Margyane and the promise he had made to Amgiad and underground spirits. He now confesses to her, asking for forgiveness, cursing his former folly and desire for riches, now conjuring his fidelity, pledging that he is determined, by all cost, to keep her instead. In the middle of his struggle, when he convinced her of his love (their second love duet), Amgiad appears suddenly, as previously under the disguise of the dervish, coming now to claim his prey. They are left alone. But no threats, no arguments from Amgiad, no scary voices of underground spirits warning him of eternal punishment for breaking his vow are enough for Sélim to betray his love now. Seeing such determination Amgiad is almost ready to leave when Margyane, who witnessed half of their conversation and horrific voices, suddenly bars his exit, demanding that he rather should take her, that she does not desire to be an object for breaking such terrible vow, stating that she, from pure love to him, will rather willingly sacrifice herself than be the cause of his eternal punishment. Sélim draws his dagger, ready to defend her with his own life. But one sign of hand from Amgiad is enough to stop such silly move short: he then plunges Sélim in a gentle sleep taking away tearful Margyane.

Sélim wakes up soon after they left, barely remembering what happened to him. Now underground voices announce that since he fulfilled his pledge after all, and the magical thirteenth statue belongs to him. To his horror he fully recollects and, discovering Margyane gone, full of love and rage, cursing his previous folly and desire, he takes his servant and they rush to collect the promised riches, but with the wild determination to smash the statue which cost him so dearly. But at the crucial moment when he is about to strike the fatal blow of destruction, he sees rising empty pedestal and Margyane herself standing there, smiling and promptly falling into his arms. Among general jubilation, Amgiad appears in magnificent costume of the genie, the master of all jinni, and he says these words, which form the conclusion and the moral of the fable:

Il est un trésor
Plus rare que l'or
De toute la terre,
Plus pur que le jour:
C'est le doux mystère
Qu'on appelle amour.

It is a treasure
Rarer than gold
Of all the Earth.
More pure than the day:
It's sweet mystery
Called love.

== Recordings ==
Although no known commercial recording made by live orchestras of it exists, complete recordings of music of La statue were made and they are now available: a free recording (arrangement for piano sextet) available at IMSLP, and a commercial recording using VST in new orchestration done by Voytek Gagalka at Amazon.com.

== See also ==
- Sigurd, 1884 opera by Reyer
- Salammbô, 1890 opera by Reyer
