= Camille du Locle =

French theatre manager and librettist

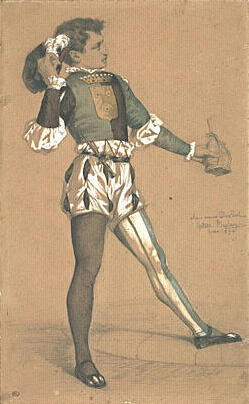
Portrait by Gustave Boulanger, Rome (1854)

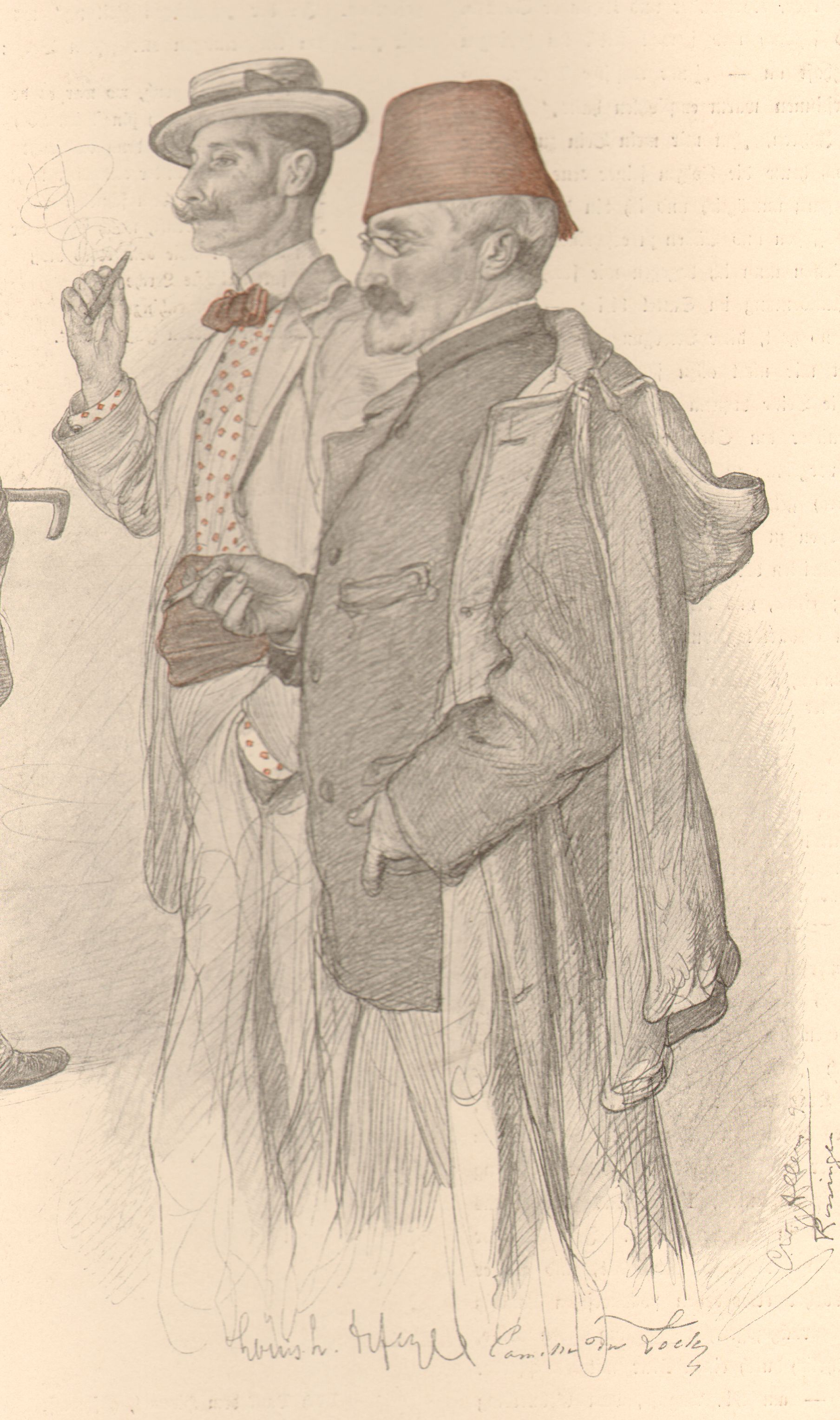
Camille du Locle (right; 1893)

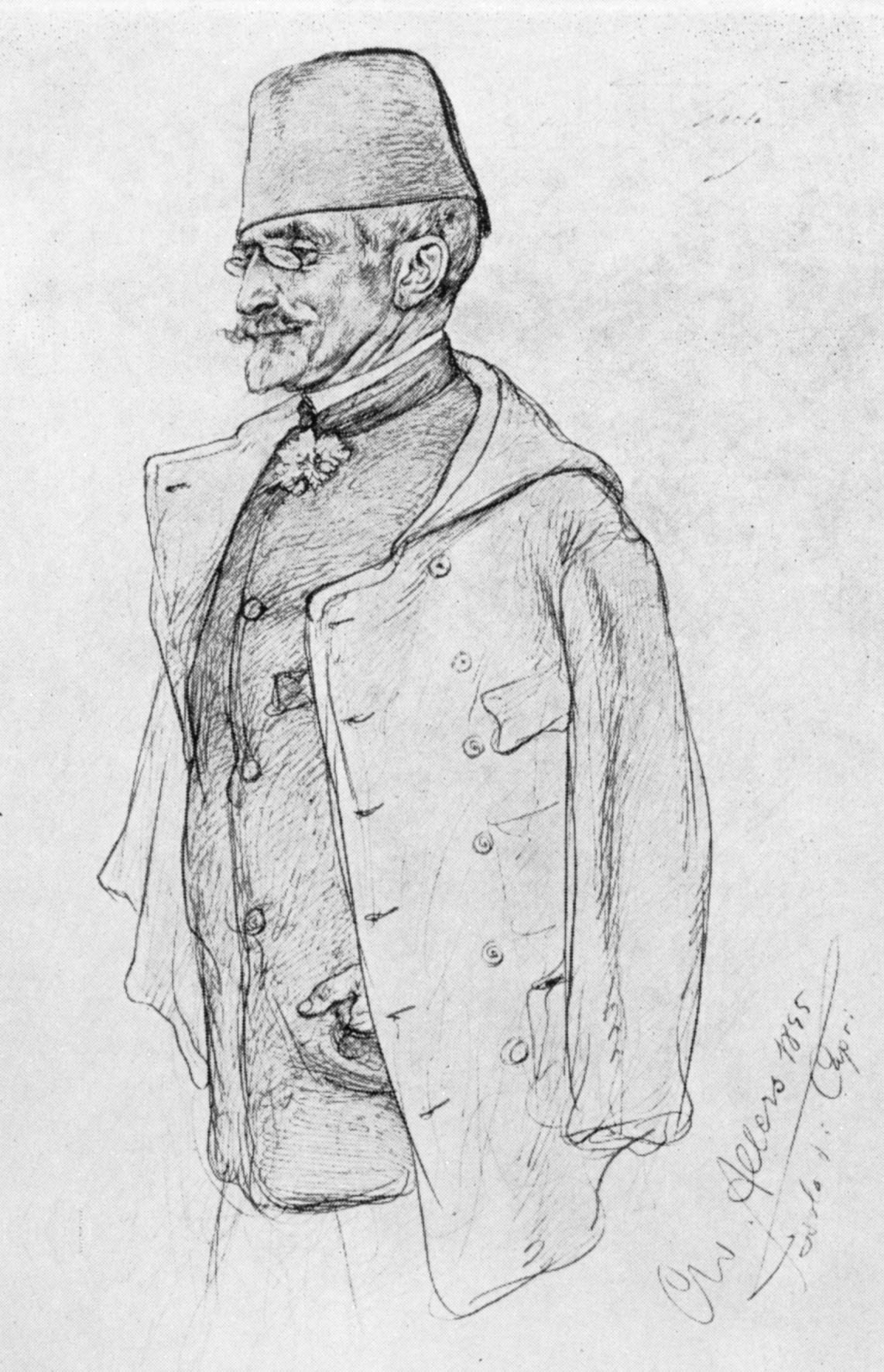
Camille du Locle (1895)

Camille du Locle (16 July 1832 – 9 October 1903) was a French theatre manager and a librettist. He was born in Orange, France. From 1862 he served as assistant to his father-in-law, Émile Perrin, at the Paris Opéra. From 1870, he was co-director at the Opéra-Comique with Adolphe de Leuven, and sole director from 1874 to 1876. He is best remembered for mounting the original production of Bizet's Carmen in 1875.

Du Locle was responsible for completing the libretto of Giuseppe Verdi's Don Carlos (1867) after the death of Joseph Méry. He also played a key role in the genesis of Aida in 1869–70.

According to Charles Pigot, Du Locle inspired the subject, words and music of Bizet's Djamileh (1872). He was a pall-bearer at Bizet's funeral in 1875 and made a speech at his interment at Père Lachaise.

In 1876, a financial dispute arose with Verdi, and Du Locle moved to Capri, where he constructed and lived in the Villa Certosella, now a hotel. In Capri he was known for his reclusiveness, short temper, and sharp tongue. He often went around in a French suit, causing him to be regarded as a bit eccentric. One day he started attracting attention by wearing a suit and cape made of rough, uncoloured wool, a fabric usually only worn by fishermen. Soon many of the Germans and English on the island adopted attire made of similar material, which stimulated a local industry of hand-woven wool cloth which persisted until machine-made fabrics took over several decades later.

His friendship with Ernest Reyer led to him providing libretti for Sigurd (1884) and Salammbô (1890).

Du Locle died in Capri in 1903.

== Bibliography ==
- Budden, Julian (1985). Verdi. London: J M Dent & Sons. ISBN 9780195323429.
- Dean, Winston (1975). Bizet. Lond, Melbourne, and Toronto: J. M. Dent & Sons. ISBN 9780460031639.
- Huebner, Steven (1992). "Du Locle, Camille", vol. 1, p. 1272, in The New Grove Dictionary of Opera, four volumes, edited by Stanley Sadie. London & New York: Macmillan. ISBN 9780935859928. ISBN 9780195221862 (1998 paperback). Online reprint, Grove Music Online (subscription, Wikilibrary access, or UK public library membership required)
- Steegmuller, Francis, editor and translator (1982). The Letters of Gustave Flaubert: 1857-1880. Cambridge, Massachusetts: Harvard University Press. ISBN 9780674526402.
