= Rose Caron =

French opera singer (1857–1930)

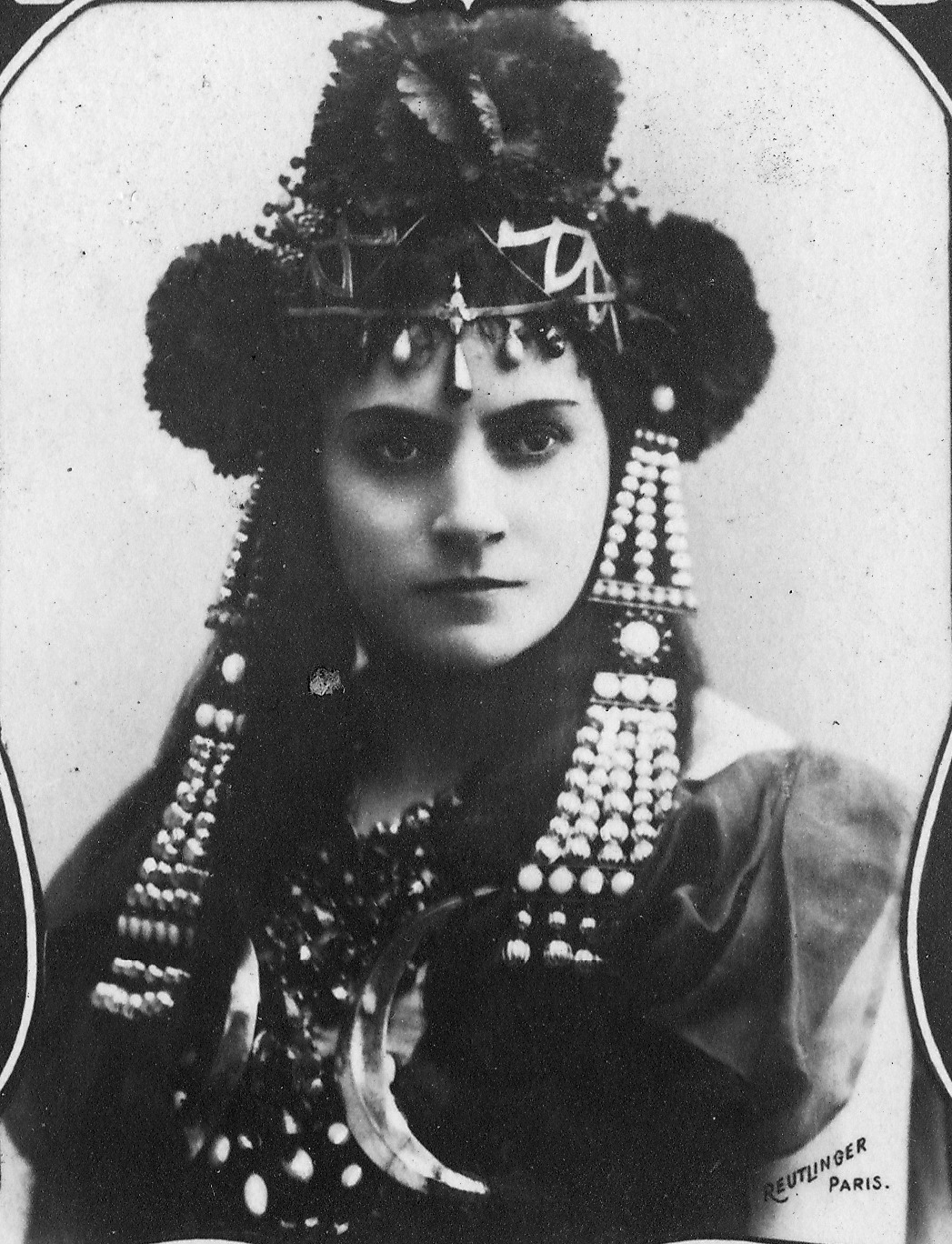
- Caron, 1900
- Born: 17 November 1857; Monnerville, Second French Empire
- Died: 9 April 1930 (aged 72); Paris, French Third Republic
- Education: Paris Conservatoire

Rose Caron (17 November 1857 – 9 April 1930) was a French operatic dramatic soprano.

== Early life ==
Caron was born on 17 November 1857 in Monnerville. She studied at the Paris Conservatoire, but was not accepted into the Paris Opera. Her husband, an accompanist, encouraged her to take lessons from Marie Sasse. With Sasse's help, Caron secured engagements at the opera in Brussels following her concert debut in 1880.

== Career ==
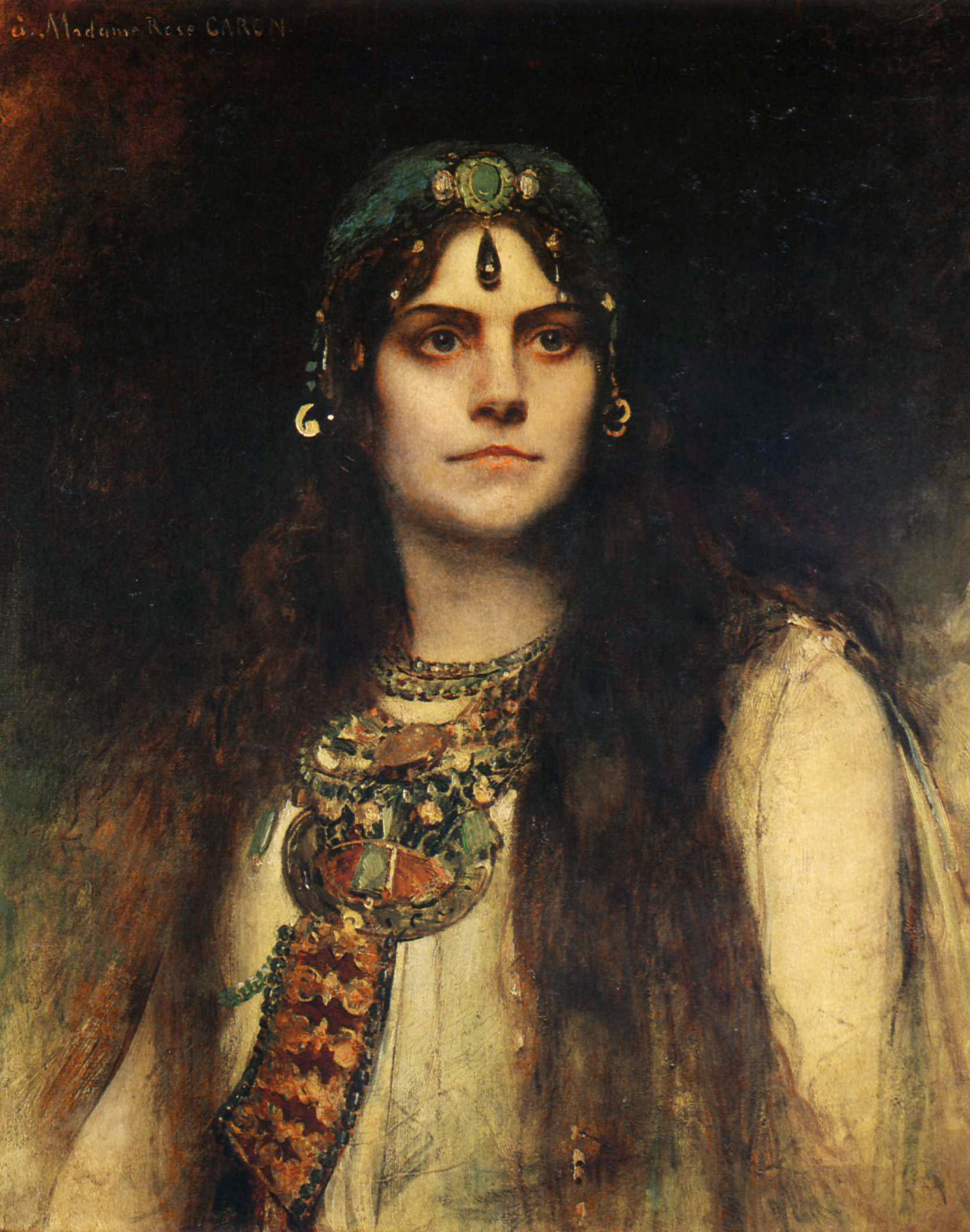
Caron in the role of Salammbo, by Léon Bonnat.

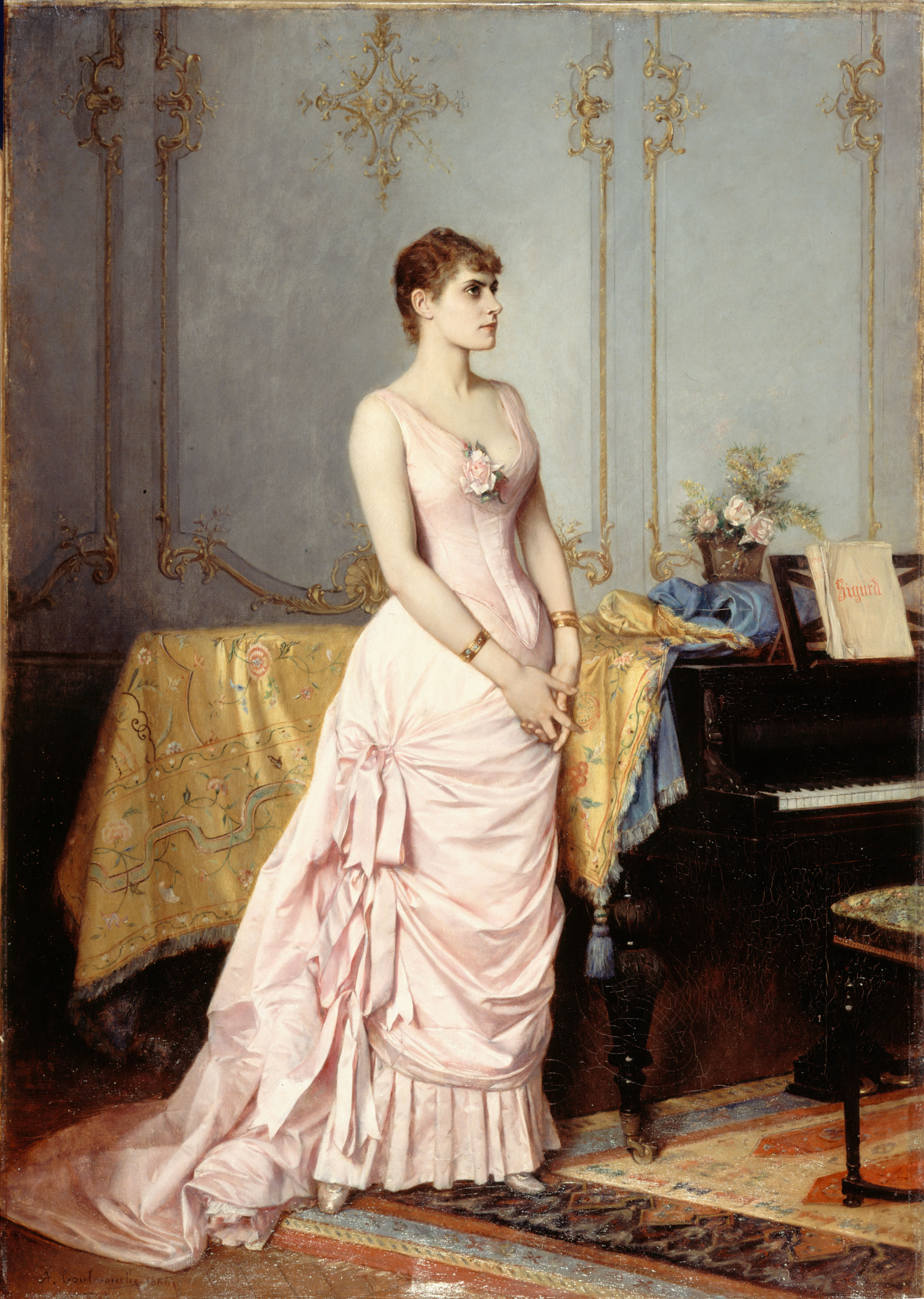
Rose Caron, by Auguste Toulmouche

Her operatic debut in Brussels was as Alice in Meyerbeer's Robert le Diable. She went on to perform as Salomé in Massenet's Hérodiade and Marguerite in Gounod's Faust. Ernest Reyer took notice of her talent and chose her play the role of Brunehild in Sigurd in 1884 (with a Paris premiere in 1885). In 1888, she originated the role of Laurence in Benjamin Godard's Jocelyn at La Monnaie de Munt in Brussels. In 1890, Caron also originated the title role in Reyer's Salammbo in Brussels.

In 1885, she began singing at the Paris Opera, where she became the chief rival of Lucienne Bréval. Caron was the first in Paris to sing Desdemona in Verdi's Otello. Her repertoire included several Wagnerian roles, including Sieglinde in Die Walküre, as well as Rachel in Halévy's La Juive and Valentine in Meyerbeer's Les Huguenots. At the Opéra-Comique, she sang Léonore in Beethoven's Fidelio (in 1898) and the title roles in Gluck's Iphigénie en Tauride and Orphée.

Caron sang in the first performance of Debussy's L'enfant prodigue on 27 July 1884, as part of the composition competition of the Prix de Rome in Paris.

Caron sang a few times with the Société des Concerts du Conservatoire: in December 1885/January 1886, she performed airs from Der Freischütz by Weber and La vestale by Spontini; at the official concert of the Exposition Universelle on 20 June 1889, fragments from Ambroise Thomas's Psyché and excerpts from Reyer's Sigurd; and in March 1895, scenes from Gluck's Alceste.

She also sang Marguerite in the stage premiere of Berlioz's La damnation de Faust at Monte Carlo in 1893 with famous tenor Jean de Reszke in the title role.

After 1895, she reduced her public appearances considerably and concentrated on teaching at the Paris Conservatoire (1904–09) and then as a private tutor. One of her pupils was soprano Alice Zeppilli. She left a few recordings dating from 1902 for Zonophone, where she sounds in good voice, and the recording is fairly forward. Her 1903 and 1904 recordings, for French Fonotipia, show the faults associated with many of those recordings, and do a disservice to Caron's art.

== Personal life ==
During her lifetime, Caron was linked with French statesman Théophile Delcassé and the Prime Minister of France Georges Clemenceau.

She died in Paris at the age of 72 and was buried at the Monnerville Cemetery.

== Gallery ==
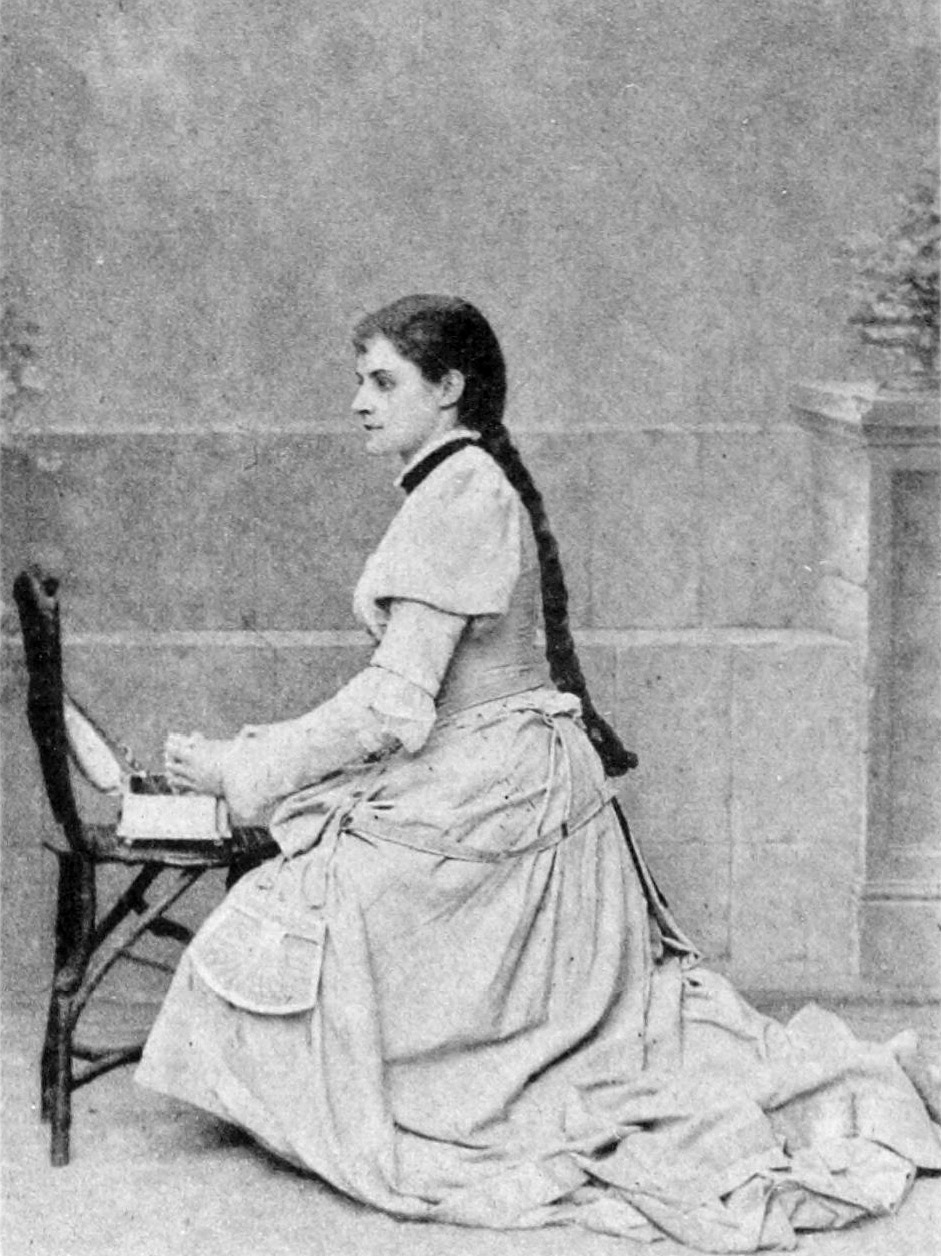
As Marguerite in Gounod's Faust for the gala 1,000th performance at the Paris Opera on 14 December 1894

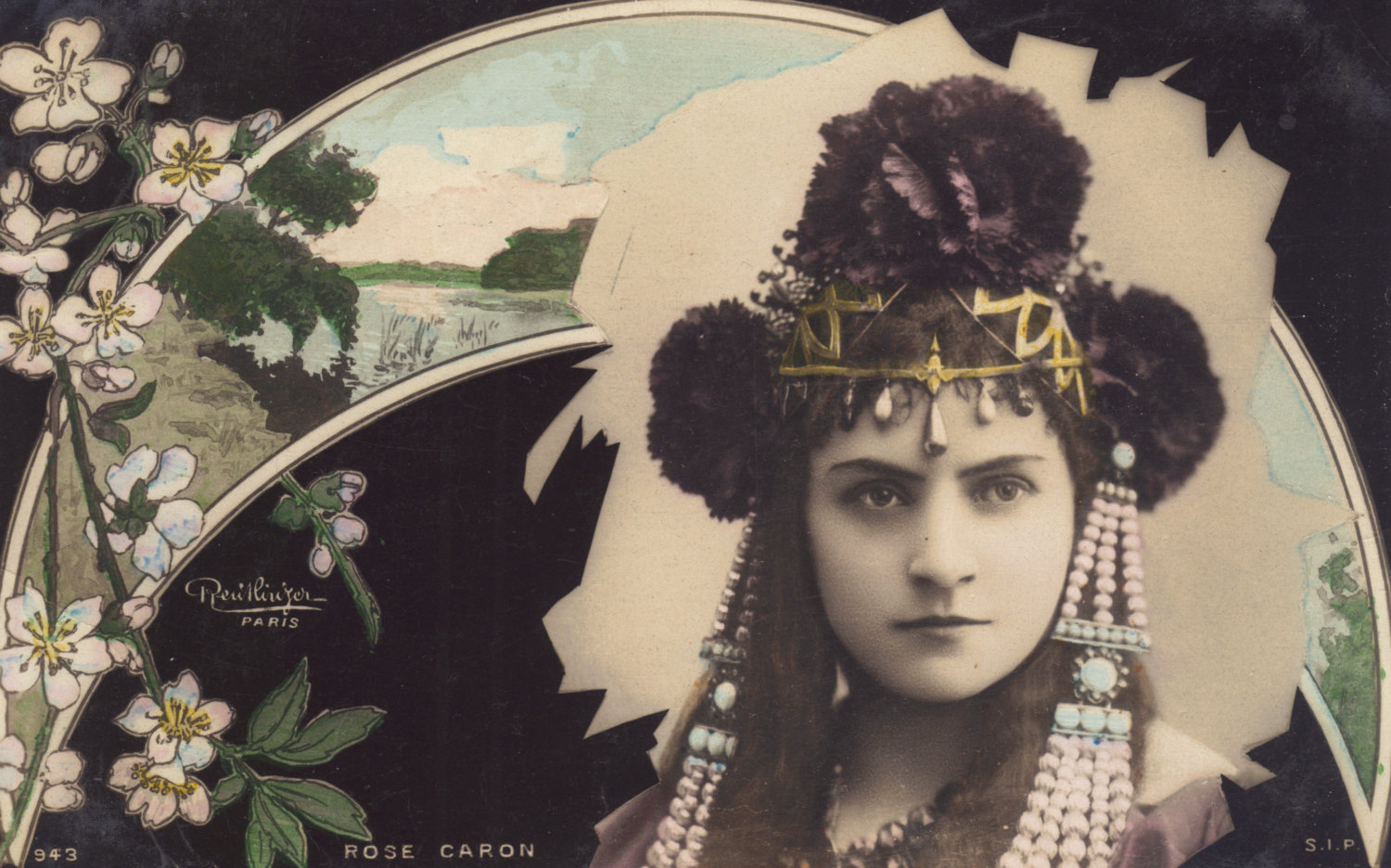
Rose Caron, by Reutlinger, circa 1905

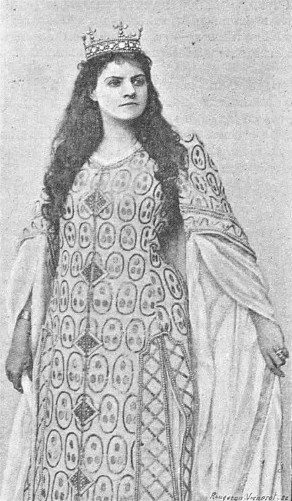
In Lohengrin, by Wilhelm Benque, 7 January 1893
