= Henri Warnots =

Belgian opera singer (1832–1893)

Henri Warnots (or Henry Warnots; 11 July 1832 – 27 February 1893) was a Belgian operatic tenor, composer and academic.

== Life ==
Warnots was borm in 1832 in Brussels; he was taught music first by his father, and in 1849 entered Brussels Conservatoire, studying harmony, piano and singing. He first appeared in opera in 1856 in Liège as a light tenor, and was afterwards engaged in theatres in Belgium, Holland and France. In August 1862 he appeared at the Opéra-Comique, Paris, in Boieldieu's Jean de Paris. At Strasbourg in January 1865, an operetta of his composition, Une Heure du Mariage, was performed. In 1867 he was engaged at the National Flemish Theatre, Brussels, where in October he sang in Flemish the leading role in Karel Miry's Frans Ackermann.

In December 1867 he was appointed professor of singing at Brussels Conservatoire, and retired from the stage. In 1869 he was appointed director of the orchestra of the Brussels City Musical Society, which staged operas under his direction including Samson and Delilah by Saint-Saëns and The Damnation of Faust by Berlioz. In 1870 he founded a school of music at Saint-Josse-ten-Noode-Schaerbeek in Brussels.

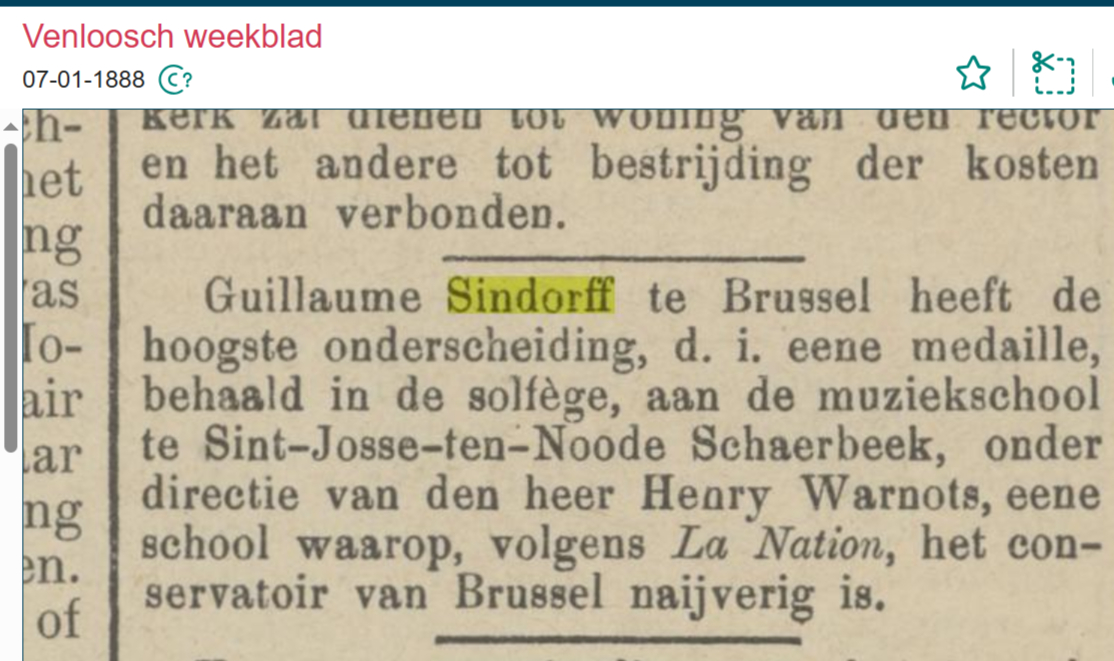
Delpher.nl - Henry Warnots rewards Guillaume (Willem) Sindorff

Warnots died in Brussels in 1893. His daughter Elly Warnots (born 1857) was an opera singer, appearing in Belgium, Italy and England.

== Compositions ==
In addition to Une Heure du Mariage, Warnots composed a Cantate Patriotique for soloists, choir and orchestra, performed in 1867 in Ghent.
