= Raoul Toché =

French playwright and journalist (1850–1895)

François-Frédéric-Raoul Toché (7 October 1850 – 18 January 1895) was a French playwright and journalist.

== Life and career ==
Toché was born on 7 October 1850 in Rueil, now known as Rueil-Malmaison, near Paris. As a playwright he is known for his collaborations with Ernest Blum. He also collaborated with Émile de Najac and Paul Siraudin. He contributed to libretti for Jacques Offenbach, Gaston Serpette and Théodore Dubois.

As a journalist he edited Le Gaulois under the pseudonym "Frimousse". His other pen names included Escopette, Raoul Tavel, Robert Triel and Gavroche. Between 1881 and 1885 he published annual retrospectives of theatrical productions in Paris

Toché was made a chevalier of the Legion of Honour in 1893. In desperate financial straits, caused by gambling debts, he killed himself on 18 January 1895 at Chantilly by shooting himself in the head.

== Stage works ==
Works to which Toche contributed include:

- 1877 – Chanteuse par amour
- 1878 – La revue des Variétés
- 1880 – Belle Lurette
- 1881 – La Noce d'Ambroise
- 1884 – Le Château de Tire-Larigot
- 1885 – Le Gazier
- 1885 – Le Petit chaperon rouge
- 1888 – Les Femmes nerveuses
- 1889 – Le Parfum
- 1890 – Les Miettes de l'année
- 1890 – Le Collectionneur
- 1890 – Le Cadenas
- 1890 – Paris fin de siècle
- 1892 – Le Monde ou l'on flirte
- 1893 – La maison Tamponin
- 1893 – Les Femmes des amis
- 1894 – Madame Mongodin.

Source: Bibliothèque nationale de France, and The New York Times.
