= Ernest Blum =

French playwright (1836–1907)

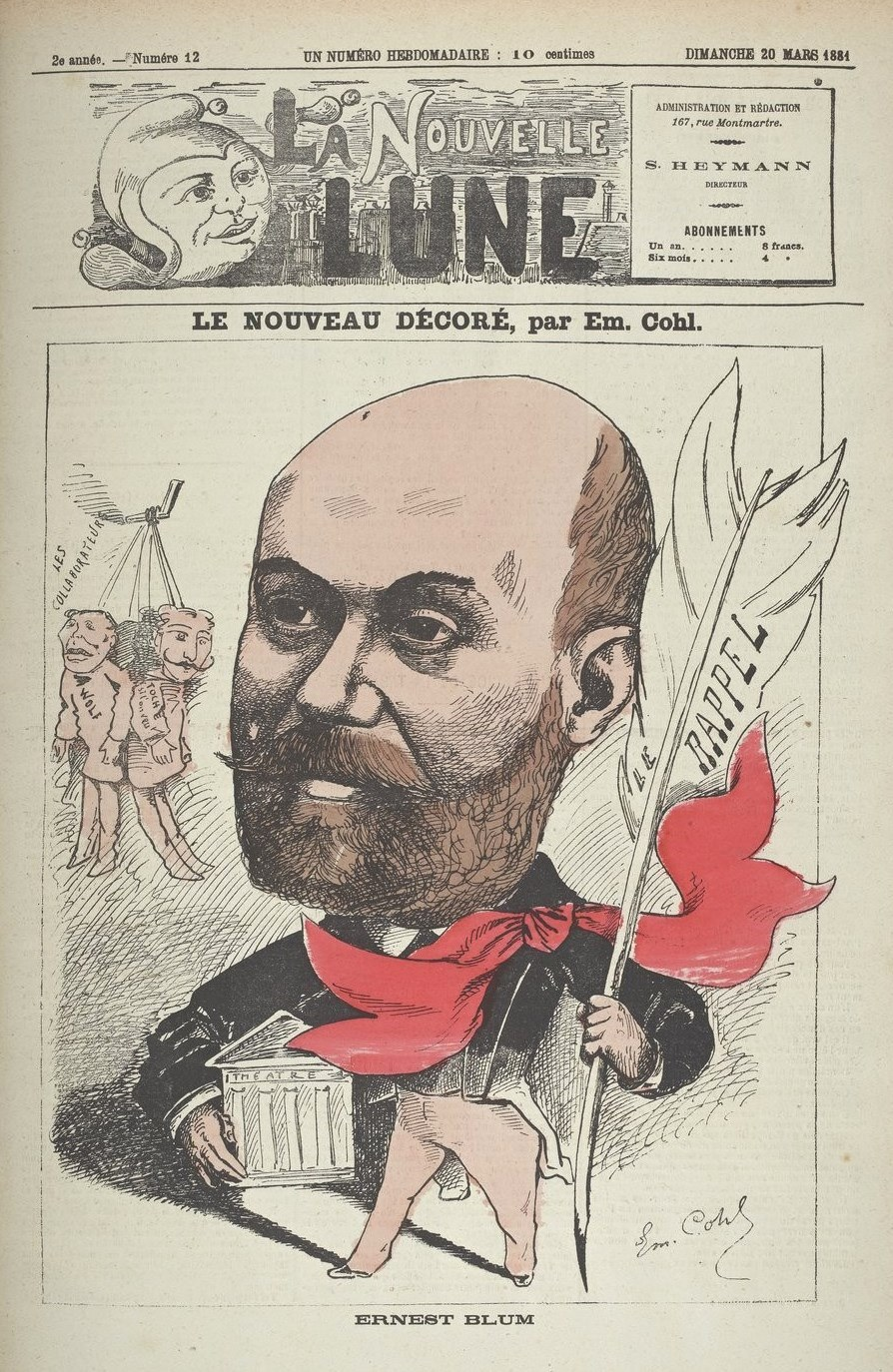
Caricature of Ernest Blum by Émile Cohl (La Nouvelle Lune, 20 March 1881

Ernest Blum (15 August 1836 – 18 September 1907) was a French playwright.

== Biography ==
He made his debut as a writer at the age of sixteen with Une femme qui mord. As a journalist, he was associated with Le Charivari, Le Rappel, Le Gaulois, and other publications. Many of his dramatic works were written in collaboration with Clairville, Flan, Monnier, Brisharre, Eugène Labiche, Raoul Toché, Auguste Anicet-Bourgeois and others. The drama of Rose Michel (1877), of his own composition, ensured his place among the most successful French dramatists of the time. Among the other noteworthy vaudevilles, librettos, and dramas of this versatile writer are the following: Les noces de diable (1862), Rocambole (1864), La jolie parfumeuse (1874), Espion du roi (1876), Le petit chaperon rouge (1885), Les femmes nerveuses (1888), La rieuse (1894), Le carillon (1897), Un soir d'hiver (1903) and Le jeu de l'amour et de la roulette (1905).

== Bibliography ==
- Gilman, D. C.; Peck, H. T.; Colby, F. M., eds. (1905). "Blum, Ernest" . New International Encyclopedia (1st ed.). New York: Dodd, Mead.
- Rines, George Edwin, ed. (1920). "Blum, Ernest" . Encyclopedia Americana.
