= Ernest Reyer =

French opera composer and music critic

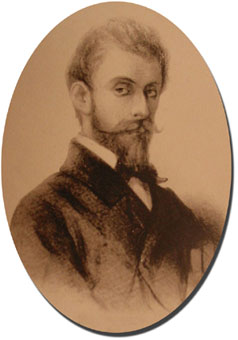
Ernest Reyer, about 1848

Louis Étienne Ernest Reyer (1 December 1823 – 15 January 1909) was a French opera composer and music critic.

== Biography ==
Ernest Reyer was born in Marseille. His father, a notary, did not want his son to take up a career in music. However, he did not actively block his son's ambitions and allowed him to attend classes at the Conservatoire from age six to sixteen. In 1839, when he was 16 years old, Ernest traveled to north Africa to work under his brother-in-law, head of accounting for the Treasury Department in Algeria. The job was not a good fit with Reyer's nonchalant and undisciplined temperament. From administrative documents, it is apparent that Reyer wrote innumerable youthful essays and stories, and original dance pieces. Some of his early compositions achieved local notoriety and received favorable comments in the Algerian press, including a Mass performed at the cathedral that was performed for the arrival of the Duke of Aumale in 1847.

Reyer returned to Paris during the events of 1848. During this period, he was introduced to various eminent artists, including Gustave Flaubert and Théophile Gautier. Southern France and Provence held its allure, and Reyer returned there to socialize with local people with whom he loved to play dominoes while smoking a pipe. He said that his pipe was his best source of inspiration.

His aunt, Louise Farrenc, professor of piano at the Conservatoire and a talented composer in her own right, directed Reyer's early musical studies. In 1850, he composed a symphonic ode entitled Le Sélam for soloists and chorus to words by Gautier. Four years later, in 1854, he composed music for an opera in one act, Maître Wolfram ("Master Wolfram"), whose libretto was by Joseph Méry. Hearing a performance of this work at the Opéra Comique, Berlioz recognized Reyer's talent. He said that Reyer's output had "nothing in common with the somewhat affected, somewhat dilapidated approach the Paris muse [...]. His melodies are natural [...]. There's heart and imagination there."

Gradually, some fame came Reyer's way. In 1857, the critic Charles Monselet wrote: "Is this a musician who writes, or a writer who makes music? I do not know, but I am hopeful that this spirited boy will make his way to singing and writing." Admittedly, Reyer was not (yet) unanimously praised and some critics pointed-out that his orchestration had not achieved a level of musical genius.

The following year he composed a ballet, Sacountalâ, with a story, once again, by Gautier, the plot of which was based on Kālidāsa's Shakuntala. The ballet was given twenty-four performances through to 1860.

In 1861, Reyer composed an opéra-comique in three acts and six scenes, La statue ("The Statue"), whose plot was inspired by "One Thousand and One Nights" (also knowns as: "Arabian Nights") with a libretto by Michel Carré and Jules Barbier. It was premiered in Théâtre Lyrique in Paris on April 11, 1861. In less than two years, La statue achieved sixty performances, an impressive figure for the period.

Reyer's work was finally universally recognized in 1862, and the composer from Marseilles became a chevalier of the Legion of Honour. The same year, he composed Érostrate, an opera in two acts, which was played in August 1862 in Baden-Baden, under the auspices of great families in Europe, which earned him the distinction of receiving the Red Eagle from the hands of the Queen of Prussia.

Little by little, however, his reputation began to decline. The same Érostate failed completely in Paris and was staged for only three performances, which deprived the work of a possible production at the Opéra.

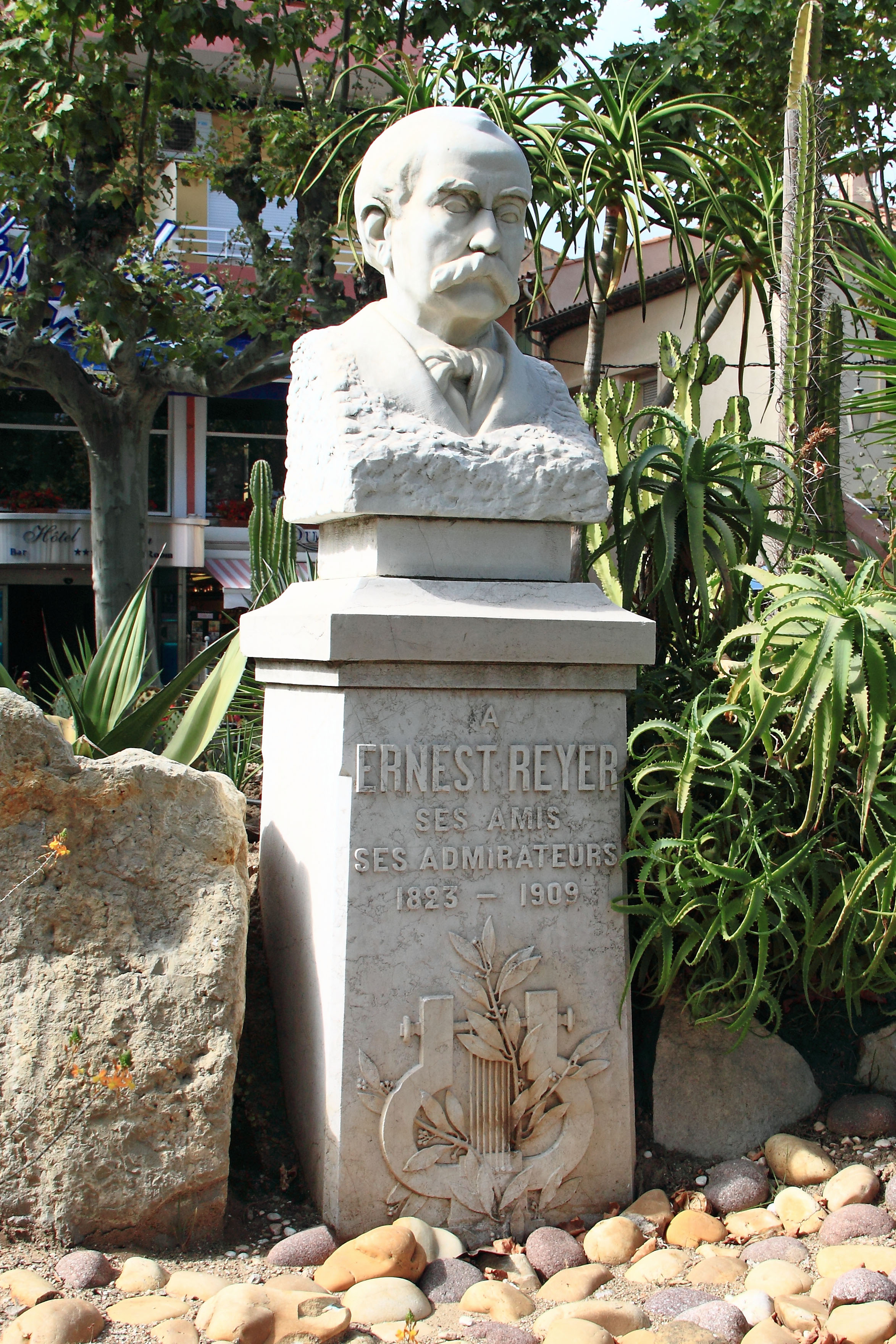
The bust of Reyer, located in Le Lavandou where he died in 1909.

The best-known of his five operas is Sigurd (1884); it was quite popular in France during its initial production there (it had its premiere in Brussels at the Théâtre de La Monnaie in January 1884), and is sometimes (although rarely) revived. Sigurd is based on the Scandinavian legends of the Edda Völsunga saga (Nibelungenlied), the same source which Richard Wagner drew upon for the libretto for his Ring cycle. The music of Sigurd, however, is quite unlike the music of Wagner. While Reyer admired Wagner, he developed his music more along the lines of his mentor, Hector Berlioz. Listening to Sigurd, one cannot help but hear echoes of Les Troyens or Benvenuto Cellini, imbued with the same heroic musical posture.

Reyer's last opera was Salammbô (1890), based on the novel by Gustave Flaubert, which achieved 46 performances from May to December 1892. The work had been composed several years earlier but had been met with initial resistance by administrators, as had Sigurd. It was first performed at the Théâtre de la Monnaie in Brussels in 1890, and at the Théâtre des Arts in Rouen.

Unable to live on the proceeds from his operas, Reyer succeeded Berlioz as music critic at the Journal des débats. He also worked as the librarian at the Académie de musique.

Reyer died in Le Lavandou, in the south of France, ~80 km east of Marseilles.

== Selected compositions ==
- Chœur des buveurs et chœurs des assiégés, ca. 1848.
- Le sélam, 1850.
- Maître Wolfram, 1-act Opéra Comique, 1854.
- Sacountalâ, ballet 1858.
- Chant des paysans (from Les Volontaires de 1814 by V. Séjour), 1861.
- La statue, 1861.
- Erostrate, 1862.
- L'hymne du Rhin, words by Méry, 1865.
- La Madeleine au désert, poems by Ed. Blau, 1874.
- Marche tzigane.
- Recueil de mélodies et de fragments d'opéras.
- Sigurd, 1884.
- Salammbô, 1890.
- Tristesse, poems by Ed. Blau, 1884.
- L'homme, poems by G. Boyer, 1892.
- Trois sonnets, poems by C. du Locle.

== Selected writings in French ==
- Notes de musiques, Charpentier, 1875.
- Notice sur Félicien David, Académie des Beaux-Arts, 17 November 1877.
- Berlioz, Revue des Revues, 1 January 1894.
- Quarante ans de musique (1857–1899), posthumous publication with preface and notes by Henriot, Calmann-Lévy, 1910, in-8°.
