= Dominique-Alexandre Parodi =

French poet

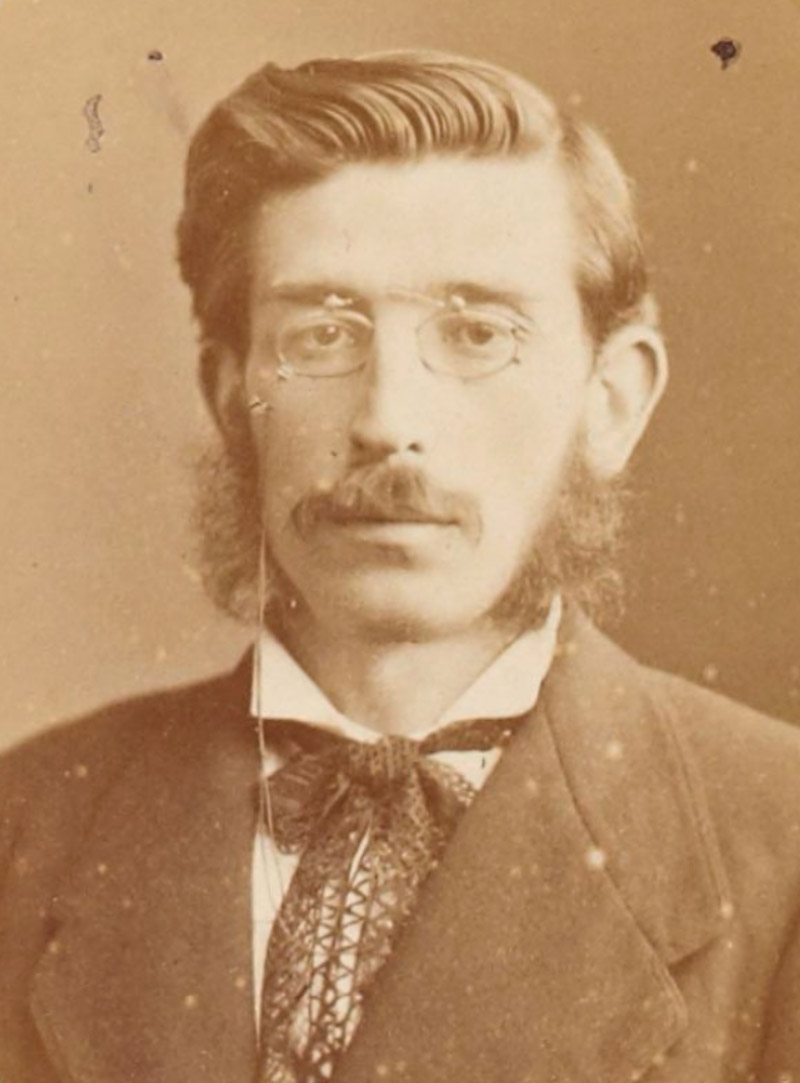
Dominique-Alexandre Parodi c.1880

Dominique-Alexandre Parodi (Domenico Alessandro Parodi in Italian publications) (b. 15 October 1840 – d.1901), known as Alexandre (Alessandro), was a naturalised French writer, poet and dramatist of Graeco-Italian extraction.

== Biography ==
He was born in Chania, Crete, to Margarita Vitale and Domenico Parodi. His mother was from Smyrna (now İzmir) in western Anatolia and his father was Genoese, born in Loano, Liguria. He was the fourth of seven children. He lived in Smyrna from 1843 until 1861. He moved to Milan and then Genoa where he married Vittoria d'Aste, daughter of the playwright Ippolito d'Aste and granddaughter of the Genoese printer Antonio Ponthenier. They had two sons: Dominique Hippolyte Tite Marius (b.1870, Genoa) a philosopher and educational administrator, and Hippolyte (b.1874, Bois-Colombes) a pioneering civil electrical engineer.

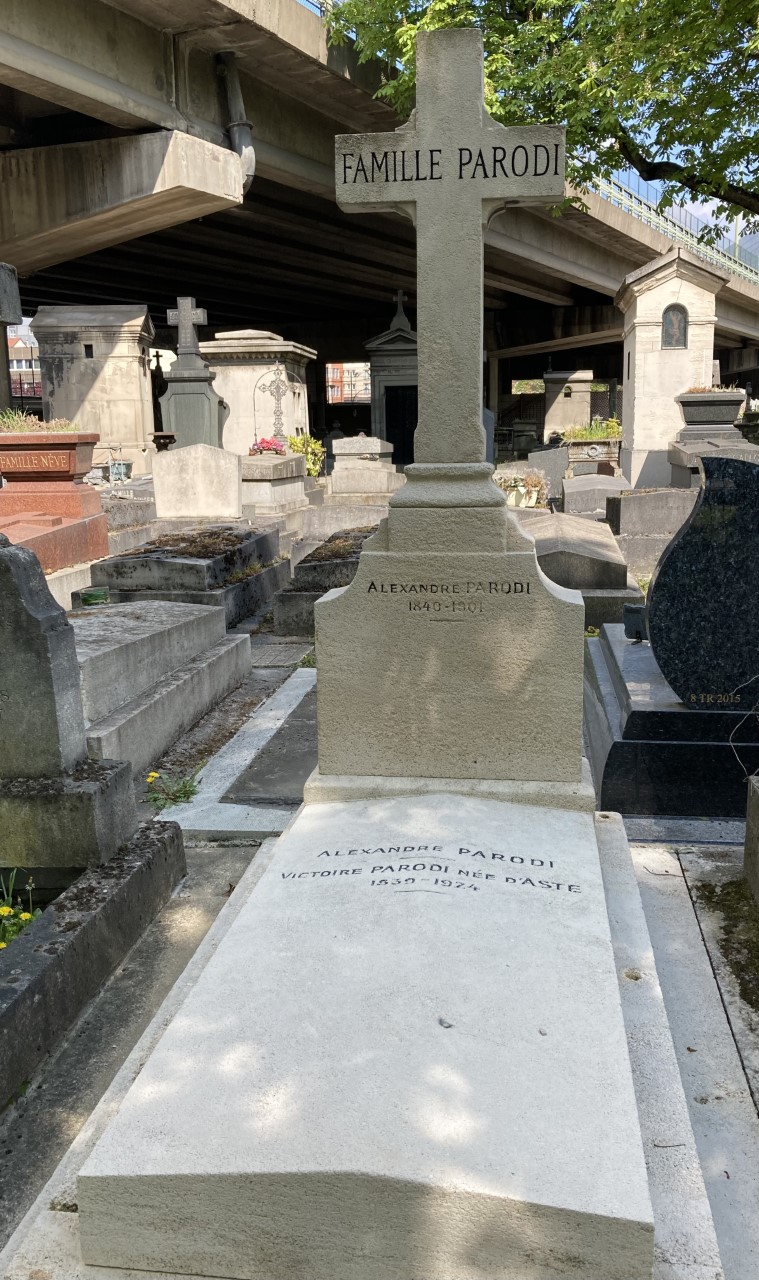
Grave of Victoire (Vittoria) and Dominique-Alexandre Parodi in Batignolles

He worked as a journalist and columnist for several Italian newspapers, including L'Illustrazione Italiana. He settled permanently in Paris in 1871 (and became a naturalized French citizen in 1881) having published his first book in France in 1865. He continued to write poetry and articles for Italian journals, particularly in L'Illustrazione under titles such as Notizie Letterarie (Literary notices) and Corriere di parigi (Paris Courier). He penned various plays, often in verse, some of which were put to music and in the case of Rome vaincue later transformed into an opera, Roma. He became an inspector of municipal libraries in 1886. He died in Paris in 1901. He was buried in the Cimetière des Batignolles), Paris, survived by his wife and two sons.

== Written works ==
=== Poetry ===
- Passions et Idées (1865) Paris, E.Dentu
- Nouvelles Messéniennes, 1867, Brussels, Genoese edition for the benefit of Cretans.
- Cris de la chair et de l'âme(1883) Paris, E.Dentu

=== Plays ===
- Rome vaincue, a tragedy in verse in five acts (1876) Paris, E. Dentu. Performed at the Comédie française on 27 September 1876 with Sarah Bernhardt. It was later translated into Italian by Ippolito Tito D'Aste and played from 1902, then adapted for opera by Jules Massenet under the name Roma, with a libretto by Henri Caïn (1912) Paris, C.Lévy.
- Ulm le parricide, a tragedy in verse (1872) Paris, Michel Lévy frères. Performed first on 1 May 1870 at the Matinées Ballande (organised by impresario Hilarion Ballande) at the Gaîté theatre, with Paul Félix Taillade.
- Sephora, mystère, a biblical poem in two acts (1877) Paris, E.Dentu
- Le Triomphe de la paix, symphonic ode in three parts (1878) Paris, E.Dentu. Performed with music by Samuel David, 18 February 1879, Théâtre lyrique Ventadour.
- L'Inflexible, a drama, 8 November 1884
- La Jeunesse de François Ier. Marignan-Pavie (1515–1525), a historical tragedy in verse in three acts (1884) Paris, E.Dentu
- La Reine Juana, a drama (1893) Paris, E.Dentu. Performed at the Comédie française, 6 May 1893, directed by Frédérique Febvre avec Mlle Brandis in the role of Floresta, M. Leitner in the role of Ferdinand d'Aragon.
- La Juive de Grenade qui devient ensuite Dom Ruy, a drama, performed at the Comédie française
- Les Rivales
- Le Pape, a tragedy in five acts (1899) Paris, A.Hennuyer
- (Translation) Francesca di Rimini, a tragedy by Silvio Pellico.

=== Books ===
- The Last of the Popes, his first French novel, written anonymously in L'Illustrazione.
- Le Théâtre en France(1885), Paris, A.Hennuyer

== Legacy ==
The Rue du Canal Saint-Martin in Paris was renamed Rue Alexandre-Parodi in 1904 in his honour.
