= Albert Vaguet =

French singer

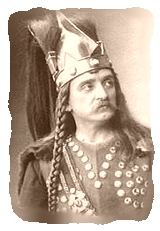
- Vaguet in Les Barbares, 1901
- Born: 15 June 1865; Elbeuf, France
- Died: 12 February 1943 (aged 77); Pau
- Education: Conservatoire de Paris
- Occupations: Opera singer; Tenor
- Organizations: Paris Opera
- Awards: Second prize for singing, opera and opéra comique from the Conservatoire de Paris

Albert Vaguet (15 June 1865 – 22 February 1943) was a French opera singer (tenor).

== Youth ==
Vaguet was born in Elbeuf (Seine-Maritime). Very young, he started singing in concerts of his hometown (church and municipal band). He was ten years old when his mother died and to help his father feed his brothers and sisters he worked as a day labourer on the quays of the Seine. He was noticed in 1885 by a journalist from the Journal d'Elbeuf.

He entered the Conservatoire de Paris in 1886. The following year, while serving in the 119th infantry regiment of Évreux, he performed in an exhibition at Le Havre where he was nicknamed "the Military Tenor" by the local press.

== The Conservatoire de musique ==
In 1889 he obtained the first singing and opéra comique runner-up, and the second opera runner-up in 1889. The following year, he left the Conservatory after winning second prizes in singing, opera and opéra comique.

Despite these second prizes - and against the advice of the critic who reproached him not being able to "get over an air without giving the flock a nest of ducks" - Pierre Gailhart, the director of the Opéra Garnier decided to trust him and engaged him as tenor. He then joined the tenors Duc, Escalaïs, Vergnet, Affre, Gérôme, Téqui, Piroia, Voulet, Devriès and Idrac.

== Opéra Garnier ==
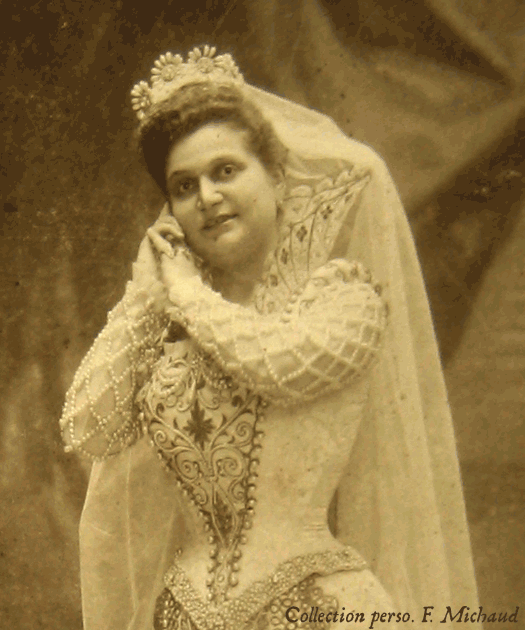
Alba Chrétien in 1894

Albert Vaguet performed for the first time on 29 October 1890 at the Palais Garnier in the role of Faust by Charles Gounod, a part he held more than 300 times. He played many roles among the works Das Rheingold, Die Meistersinger von Nürnberg by Wagner, Gwendoline by Emmanuel Chabrier, Thaïs by Jules Massenet, Otello by Verdi etc.

It was on the occasion of Déidamie in 1893 that he met Albertine Marie Chrétien, better known by her stage name Alba Chrétien, born in Paris on 8 March 1872. They married on 30 June 1894 in Paris and had two daughters.

They sang at the Orchestre de la Société des Concerts du Conservatoire and the Opera until 1903 for Albert and 1904 for Alba.

== After the Opéra ==
They settled in Nay, near Pau, in 1906. Albert, however, continued to record cylinders then 78 rpm for Pathé, and Alba to give singing lessons.

Albert and his wife died in Pau on 22 February 1943 and 28 February 1963 respectively.

== Epilogue ==
Albert Vaguet has recorded many cylinders and records for Pathé. It is not very difficult to obtain them in specialized stores. On the other hand, it is much more complicated to listen to them without damaging the support. Unfortunately, there is no compilation of his performances recorded on a modern medium, with Pathé still asserting his rights ("they will expire around 2020").

The master cylinders and discs (the originals held by Pathé) have suffered from inadequate storage conditions and are in fact irreparably altered.

== Sources ==
- L'Almanach des spectacles
- L'Année musicale
- La Nouvelle Revue
- Revue internationale de musique française, No 26
- and family documents, or delivered by J. -P. Meslin

=== Bibliography ===
- Jean-Pierre Meslin, "Albert Vaguet, un Elbeuvien sur la scène de l'Opéra de Paris", in Revue généalogique normande ISSN 0294-7382, No 92, 2004
