= Jean-François Delmas (bass-baritone) =

French opera singer

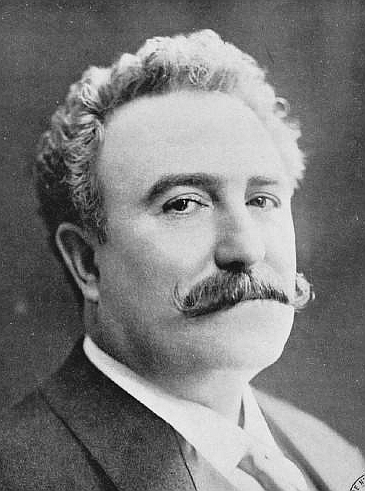
Jean-François Delmas circa 1908

Jean-François Delmas (14 April 1861 – 29 September 1933), or Francisque Delmas was a French bass-baritone who created roles in many French operas including Athanaël in Thaïs.

Delmas was born in Lyon and studied at the Paris Conservatoire winning first prizes for operatic singing. He made his debut in 1886 as Saint-Bris in Les Huguenots at the Paris Opéra. He remained with that company until 1927 and rarely sang outside France. He was known for the power and evenness of his voice with a sonorous quality in the bass range and an extended upper register, which allowed him to sing classic baritone roles such as Iago. Outside France he appeared at the Mariinsky in St Petersburg, the San Carlo in Lisbon, and the Monte Carlo Opera House in Monaco. His recordings for G&T, Pathé, Zonophone, Fonotipia, Odéon, and Opéra-Saphir are highly sought after by collectors.

He also created roles in Le Mage (Amrou), Messidor (Mathias), L'etranger (l'Etranger), Ariane (Périthoüs), Monna Vanna (Marco Colonna), Roma (Fabius), and sang in the Paris premiere of Fervaal (Arfagard).

Delmas died in Saint-Alban-de-Montbel (near Chambéry) at the age of 72, and is buried in the Cimetière Saint-Vincent de Montmartre with his wife, the soprano Blanche d'Ervilly (1853–1920).

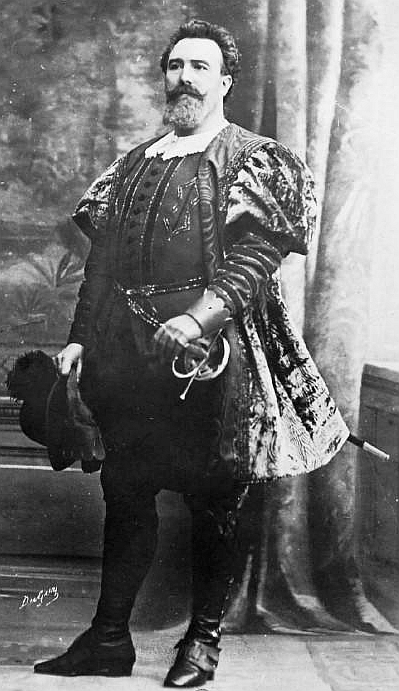
Francisque Delmas in Patrie! by Émile Paladilhe en 1907

== Repertoire ==
Repertoire
Role	Opera	Composer
Méphistophélès	La damnation de Faust	Berlioz
Mathias	Messidor	Bruneau
Gervais	L'Ouragan	Bruneau
Stratoklès	Briséïs	Chabrier
Arfagard	Fervaal	d'Indy
L'Étranger	L'Étranger	d'Indy
Hermit	La légende de Saint-Christophe	d'Indy
Malek	Antar	Dupont
Oedipus	Œdipe	Enescu
Akiba	Le fils de l'étoile	Erlanger
Marco Colonna	Monna Vanna	Février
High Priest	Alceste	Gluck
Hidraot	Armide	Gluck
Méphistophélès	Faust	Gounod
Frère Laurent; Capulet	Roméo et Juliette	Gounod
Henri	Le Roi de Paris	Hüe
Miguel	La Catalane	Le Borne
Fonfrède	Les Girondins	Le Borne
Tonio	Pagliacci	Leoncavallo
Phur	Astarté	Leroux
Don Diego	Le Cid	Massenet
Athanaël	Thaïs	Massenet
Emperor Phorcas	Esclarmonde	Massenet
Amrou	Le Mage	Massenet
Périthoüs	Ariane	Massenet
Fabius Maximus	Roma	Massenet
Jacob	Joseph	Méhul
Count of Saint-Bris	Les Huguenots	Meyerbeer
Don Giovanni; Leporello	Don Giovanni	Mozart
Count of Rysoor	Patrie!	Paladilhe
Charlemagne	La fille de Roland	Rabaud
Thésée	Hippolyte et Aricie	Rameau
Hagen	Sigurd	Reyer
Nar-Havas	Salammbô	Reyer
Gessler	Guillaume Tell	Rossini
High Priest	Samson et Dalila	Saint-Saëns
Henry VIII	Henry VIII	Saint-Saëns
Scaurus	Les barbares	Saint-Saëns
Auguste	La gloire de Corneille	Saint-Saëns
Monsoreau	La dame de Monsoreau	Salvayre
Pierre	La forêt	Savard
Il Re	Aida	Verdi
Jago	Otello	Verdi
Landgraf Hermann	Tannhäuser	Wagner
Heinrich der Vogler	Lohengrin	Wagner
Kurwenal	Tristan und Isolde	Wagner
Hans Sachs	Die Meistersinger von Nürnberg	Wagner
Wotan	Das Rheingold	Wagner
Wotan	Die Walküre	Wagner
Wotan	Siegfried	Wagner
Hagen	Götterdämmerung	Wagner
Gurnemanz	Parsifal	Wagner
Kaspar	Der Freischütz	Weber

== Sources ==
- Landru, Philippe, Cimetière Saint-Vincent de Montmartre, Cimetières de France et d'ailleurs, 2009
- Giroud, Vincent, Liner Notes: Meyerbeer on Record 1899-1913, Marston Records, 2009
- Steane, J. B., "Delmas, Jean-François" in Laura Williams Macy (ed.), The Grove Book of Opera Singers, Oxford University Press, 2008, P. 115. ISBN 0-19-533765-4
- Warrack, John Hamilton and West, Ewan (eds.), "Delmas. Francisque", The Concise Oxford Dictionary of Opera, Oxford University Press, 1996, pp. 121–122. ISBN 0-19-280028-0
