= Valentin Duc =

French opera singer (1858–1915)

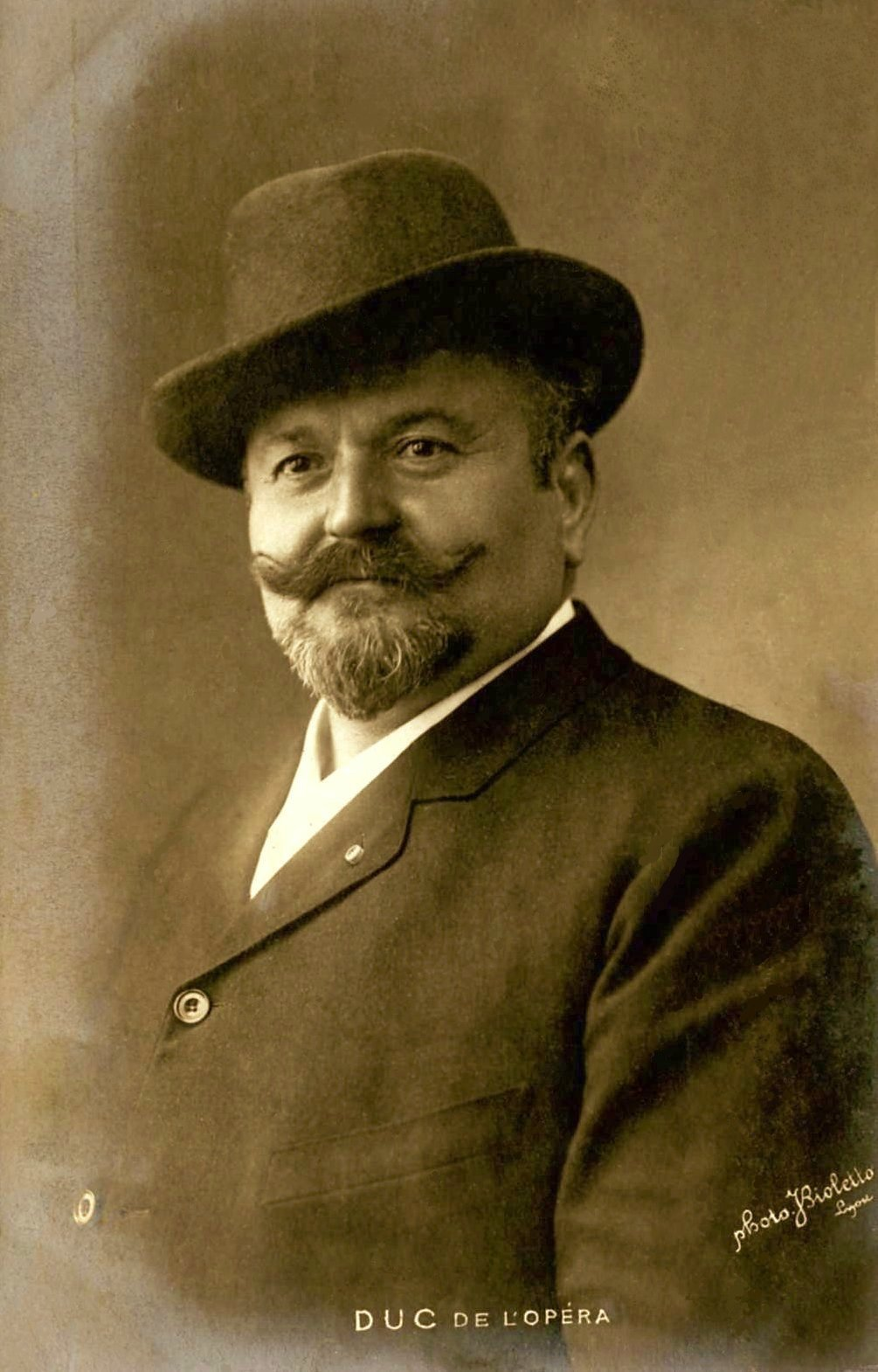
- Valentin Duc, by J. Bioletto (photographer in Lyon in 1901-1902).
- Born: 24 January 1858; Béziers, France
- Died: 23 February 1915 (aged 57); Béziers
- Education: Conservatoire de Paris
- Occupations: Opera singer; Tenor

Joseph Valentin Duc (24 January 1858 – 23 February 1915) was a French operatic tenor.

Valentin Duc is known for the creation of Karloo in Patrie! by Émile Paladilhe (20 December 1886), Déjanire by Camille Saint-Saëns (1898) with a revival at the Odéon in November 1898, Prométhée by Gabriel Fauré (1900), Messaline by Isidore de Lara (1903), Les Hérétiques by Charles-Gaston Levadé (29 August 1905).

== Biography ==
Born in Béziers, Joseph Valentin Duc was a French singer, operatic forte ténor. He is known for his repertoire at the Opéra de Paris, the Théâtre des Arènes in Béziers and world tours that took him from Monte Carlo to St. Petersburg, from Baltimore to Seville...

Son of Valentin Duc (or Duch) and Marie Fabre, originating from Tignes (Kingdom of Sardinia), he was the third in a line of eight children. These parents moved to Béziers in 1850, joining a previously established Duc branch (Jean Duc, trader, spouse Anne-Marie Gayraud, and Laurent Duc, everyday worker), spouse Marie Peronne). In the Census Table of Class 1878, he is noted as postilion of occupation on that date. He left Béziers in 1879 for his military service at Rochefort. His fencing practice must have encouraged his stage fluency in performances of historical opera. He was spotted by Cazeaux.

He was in Paris in 1883, staying at 56 bd Richard Lenoir (27 October 1883) and received at the Conservatoire de Paris (Cf. § 2.1. Formation). On leaving the conservatory on 3 June 1885, he resided at 16 bd Montmartre. On April 30, 1891, he married Marie Catherine Plomteux, annuitant (born 29 December 1850 in Hannut, Belgium). They resided at 29 place du Marché-Saint-Honoré. He then legitimized Robert, born 29 November 1890, by this act.

Leaving the Opera in 1893, he then resided in Béziers "villa Frescaty" at 29 rue des Saint-Simoniens. He remained there until his death on 23 February 1915. Although he resided in town, he only sang at the Grand-Théâtre during exceptional events. He never belonged to the permanent troupe.

== Career ==
=== Training ===
Before his Conseil de révision in 1878 (sortition in 1879), his musical studies probably took place at Béziers in the orpheonic framework and possibly in the choirs or small roles of the Grand Théâtre de Béziers. In 1882, he was admitted to the Conservatoire de Paris, in Bussine's singing class and Obin's opera class. (1st runner-up at the end of the first year). He was a resident of the town of Béziers as soon as 1882.

After leaving the Paris Conservatoire on 25 July 1885, Valentin Duc obtained the first prize for singing in front of a jury presided by Ambroise Thomas and including Massenet, Delibes, Guiraud, etc. generally acclaimed by the press (despite a very negative article in Le Figaro).

In the same promotion, he obtained first prize for opera in front of the same jury, supplemented by a few performers (Auguste Vitu in Le Figaro dated 31 July 1885 took the opposite opinion of his previous article).

=== Repertoire ===
==== Repertoire at the Paris Opera ====
Valentin Duc made his debut as Arnold in Guillaume Tell (August 1885). He sang Eleazar in La Juive (1885), Raoul of Les Huguenots (1886), Rodrigue of Le Cid (1886), Robert in Robert le diable (1888), Jean in Le Prophète (1889, Radamès in Aida (1890), Vasco in L'Africaine (1890), a role in Sigurd (1890), and finally Zarastra in Le Mage (1891).

After the fire of the Opera's sets in 1893, he left the troupe to begin his world tours.

==== Tours in province and abroad ====
According to the records of the management of the Grand Théâtre de Béziers, the articles of L'Hérault (1884-1891) and his important family correspondence by postcard it is possible to establish this list:

- 5 September 1884: benefit for the poor concert in Béziers (Grand-Théâtre).
- 30 April 1886: passage in Les Huguenots, concert-recital in Béziers (Grand-Théâtre), he sings in church and for the benefit of the poor.
- 18 March 1887: passage in Guillaume Tell, concert-récital in Béziers (Grand-Théâtre).
- 1 June 1888: concert-récital in Béziers (Grand-Théâtre).
- April 1890: passage in La Juive in Béziers (Grand-Théâtre).
- April 1891: performance in Béziers (Grand-Théâtre) with the troupe of Montpellier, he sings Le Cid by Massenet.
- 1895: Uruguay and Argentina Tour (Montevideo and Buenos Aires): He sings in Italian: Aida, Les Huguenots; Otello (only in Montevideo), Guillaume Tell, La Juive and L'Africaine
- 1896: concert of the Lyre Biterroise in Béziers (Grand-Théâtre).
- April 1897 (?): Moscow.
- 28-29 August 1898: he sings Hercules during the premiere of Déjanire.
- 1899:
  - 1899: in residence at Cairo.
  - 27-29 August 1899: he sings again the soli of Hercules during the revival of Déjanire.
- 1900:
  - 30 January 1900: Sampier Darena (sic).
  - 2 February 1900: Genova.
  - February 1900: tour in Italy - Parme, Turin, Rome, Naples, Bologne, Florence, Monaco-Monte-Carlo ("Great success yesterday in William Tell, I'm still singing on Tuesday and I hope to be in Béziers on Thursday."), Nice - Marseille.
  - 26 and 28 August 1900: he sings Kratos during the premiere of Prométhée.
  - September 1900: Aix-les-Bains.
- 1901:
  - February 1901: "We embarq for Baku."
  - 28 February 1901: in Yalta ("We enter the port of Novorossik") - Odessa.
  - 7 March 1901: Theatre of Tiflis.
  - 1 April 1901: "I went to Baku to give a concert where I had a great success." He plans to leave for Karkov for about ten days and 2 performances before the return to Paris.
  - April 1901: on his way back from Russia he stopped in Warsaw, Cologne, Hanover.
  - 22 September 1901: he sings Les Huguenots in Tiflis before leaving for Baku.
  - 31 December 1901: New-York – Departure for New Orleans.
- 1902:
  - 5 January 1902: He sings La Juive in New Orleans.
  - 19 February 1902: départure for Galvaston (sic), Texas.
  - March 1902: Chatta Nooga (sic) – Birmingham – Atlanta – Washington – Baltimore.
  - 19 April 1902: he sings the Ave verum by Pessard at the inauguration of Agde's grand organ.
  - 28 June 1902: Vichy ("I will leave Wednesday at 4:00 a. m. for Béziers where I will arrive at 6:00 a. m. Thursday morning. I'll spend three or four days"). He sings in Guillaume Tell.
  - 30 August 1902: Seville – Cadix. He plans to be in 10 days in New York, then Havana and Mexico City.
- 28 August 1904: he sings Renaud during the first performance of Armide at the Théâtre des Arènes, in front of more than 12,000 spectators. On August 30, the second performance of "Armide" is interrupted by rain from the first act, so he sang again the next day.
- 1906:
  - 26 March 1906: he sings a tune of Sigurd at the Théâtre des Célestins at a Lyonnaise Harmony gala evening.
  - 19 May 1906: he sings Les Huguenots in Romans.
- 28 July 1907: Carcassonne.

His career ended at the age of 50 in 1908, following a family event. He is buried in the old cemetery of Béziers.

==== Style - Esthetics ====
He embodies the forte tenor of romantic opera, like Agustarello Affre or Léon Escalaïs.

== Iconography ==
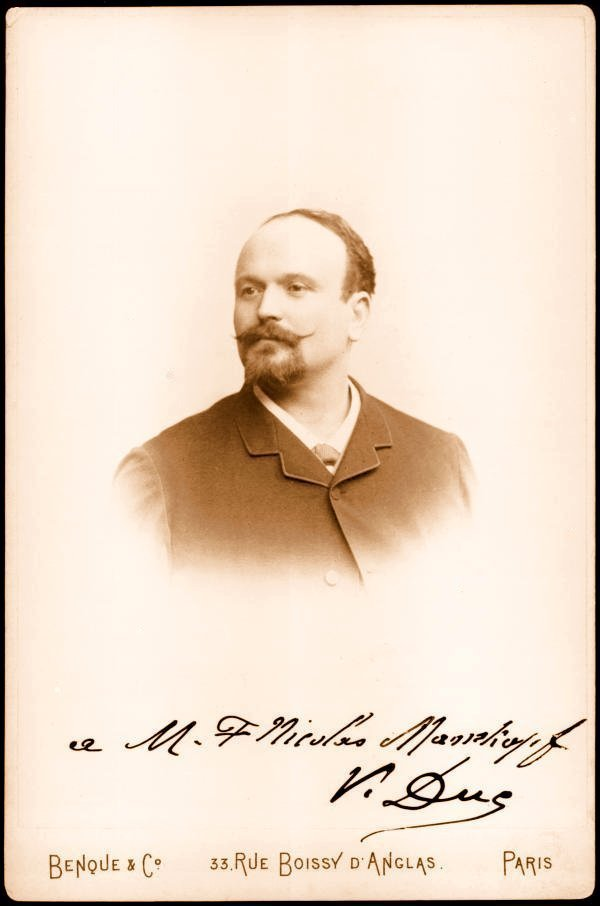
Valentin Duc, by Wilhelm Benque photographer in Paris (c. 1890)

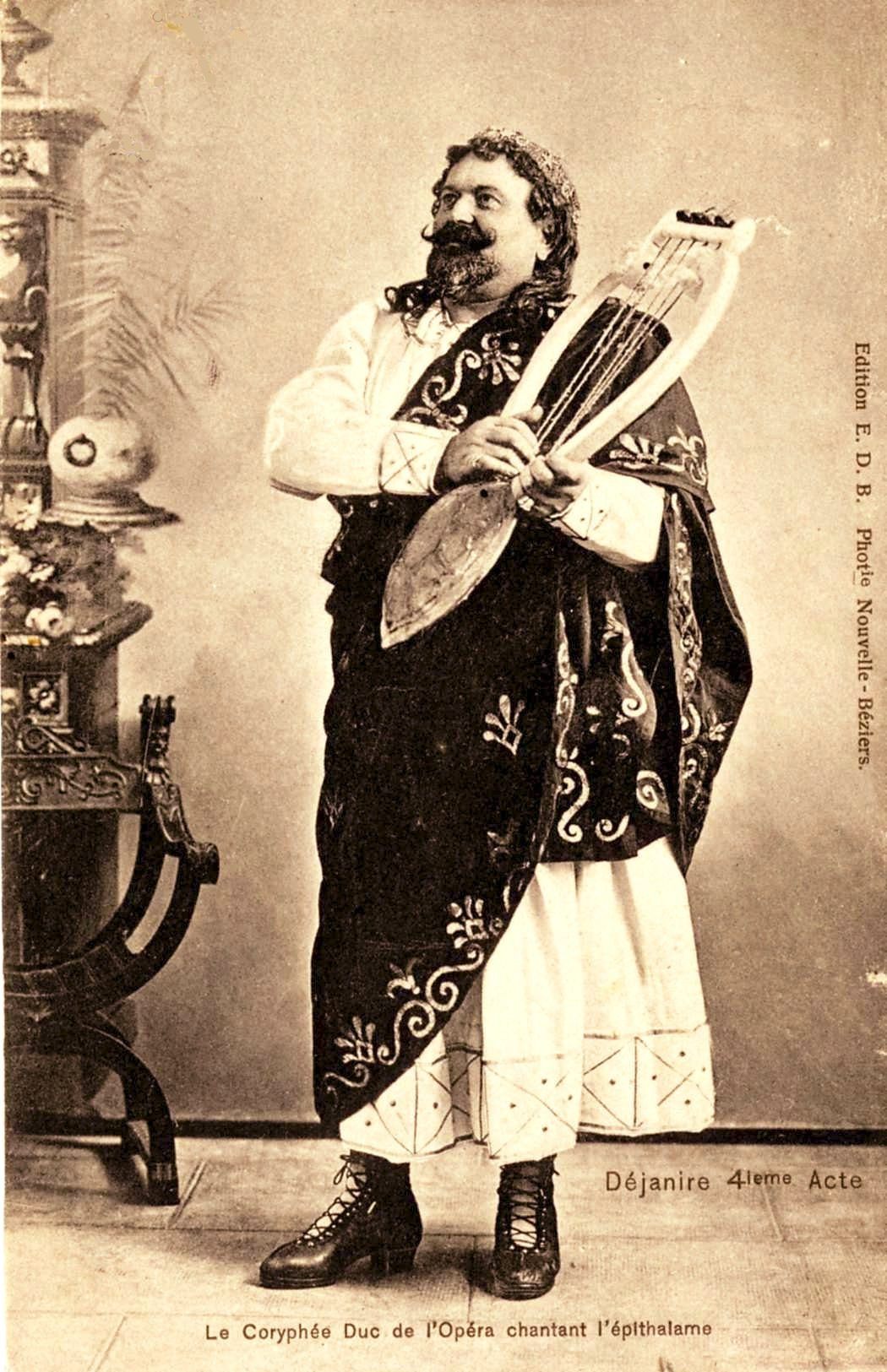
Valentin Duc, performing Déjanire, 1898–1899

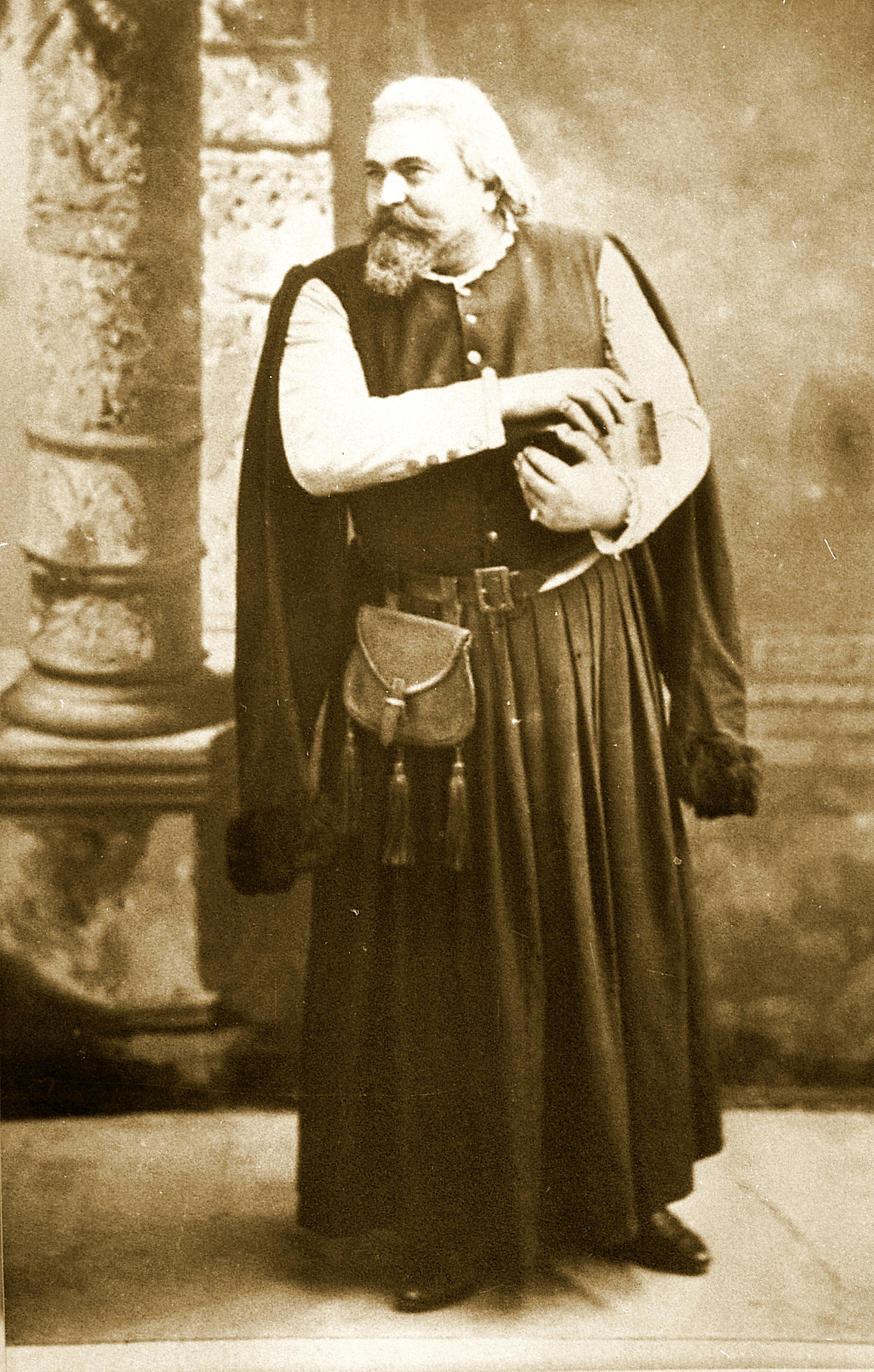
Portrait of Valentin Duc in stage costume

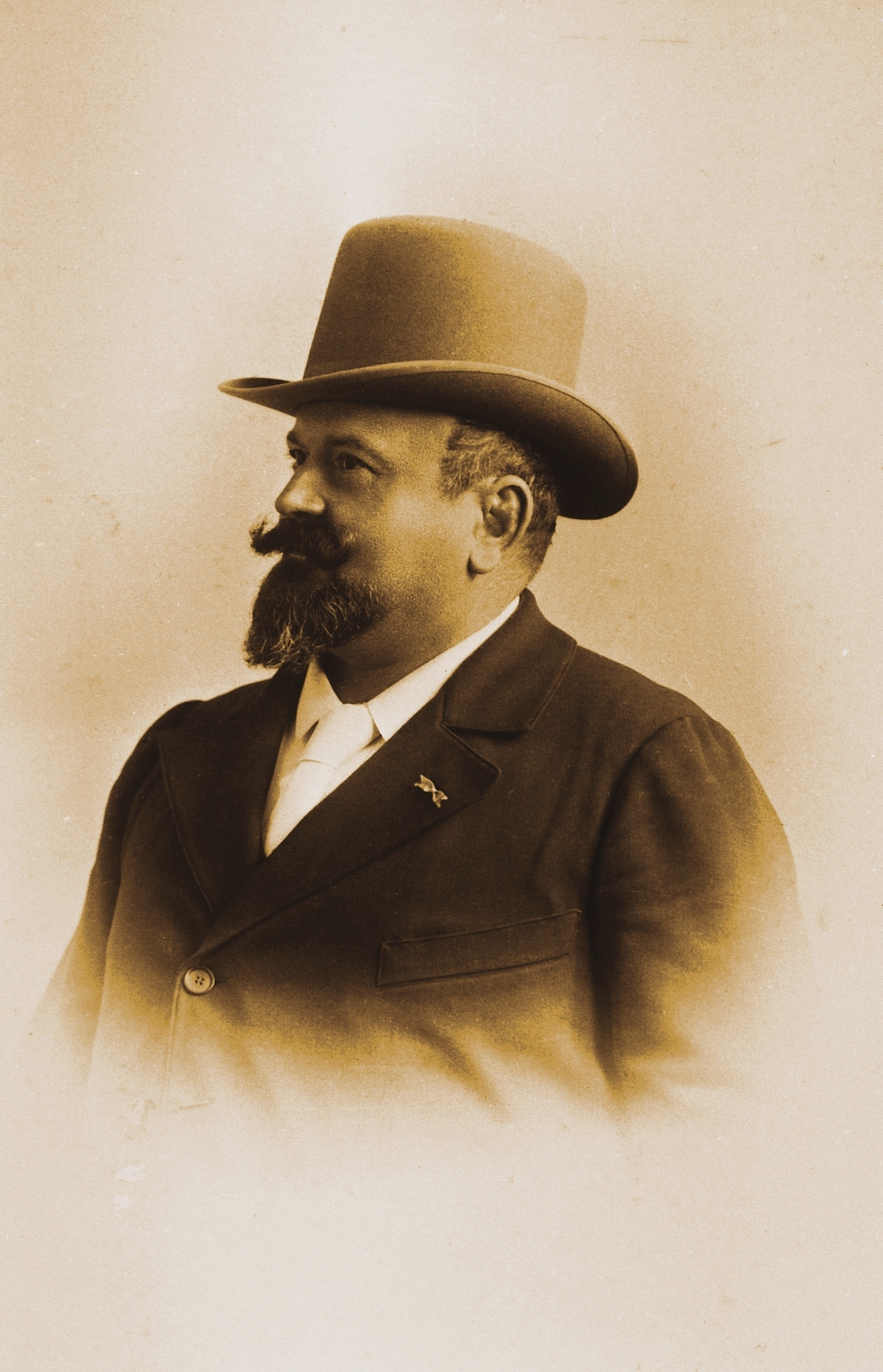
Portrait of Valentin Duc after 1907

=== Discography ===
There is no known sound recording of Valentin Duc, unlike other Biterrean tenors of this period (for example Agustarello Affre, or Léon Escalaïs).

=== Bibliography ===
- Larousse du XIXe, (2nd supplement).
- Stéphane Wolff, L'opéra au Palais Garnier (1875-1962). Paris, 1962.
- Jacqueline Gachet, Les représentations lyriques aux arènes de Béziers de 1898 à 1911. Paris, 1976 (dir.: Jacques Chailley).
- Janine et Alex Bèges, Mémoire d'un théâtre. Béziers, Société de Musicologie du Languedoc, 1987.
- Michel Viala, Mémoire en images Béziers. St.-Cyr-sur-Loire, éd. Alan Sutton, 2003; vol. 2, (p. 93 and 96): Valentin Duc.
- Pierre Clerc, Dictionnaire de biographie héraultaise, t. 1 : A-G, art. Valentin Duc, (p. 724). Presses du Languedoc, 2012.
- Alex Bèges, Jacqueline Pech, Un siècle de spectacles, de divertissements & de plaisirs à Béziers (1860-1960) - Théâtres, Cinémas, Concerts, Cafés. XXIVe Cahier de la Société Archéologique, Scientifique & Littéraire de Béziers, 2012 (for his numerous references and biographies of artists).

== See also ==
- Laurens, for one of his residences.
