= Henri Kowalski =

French pianist and composer

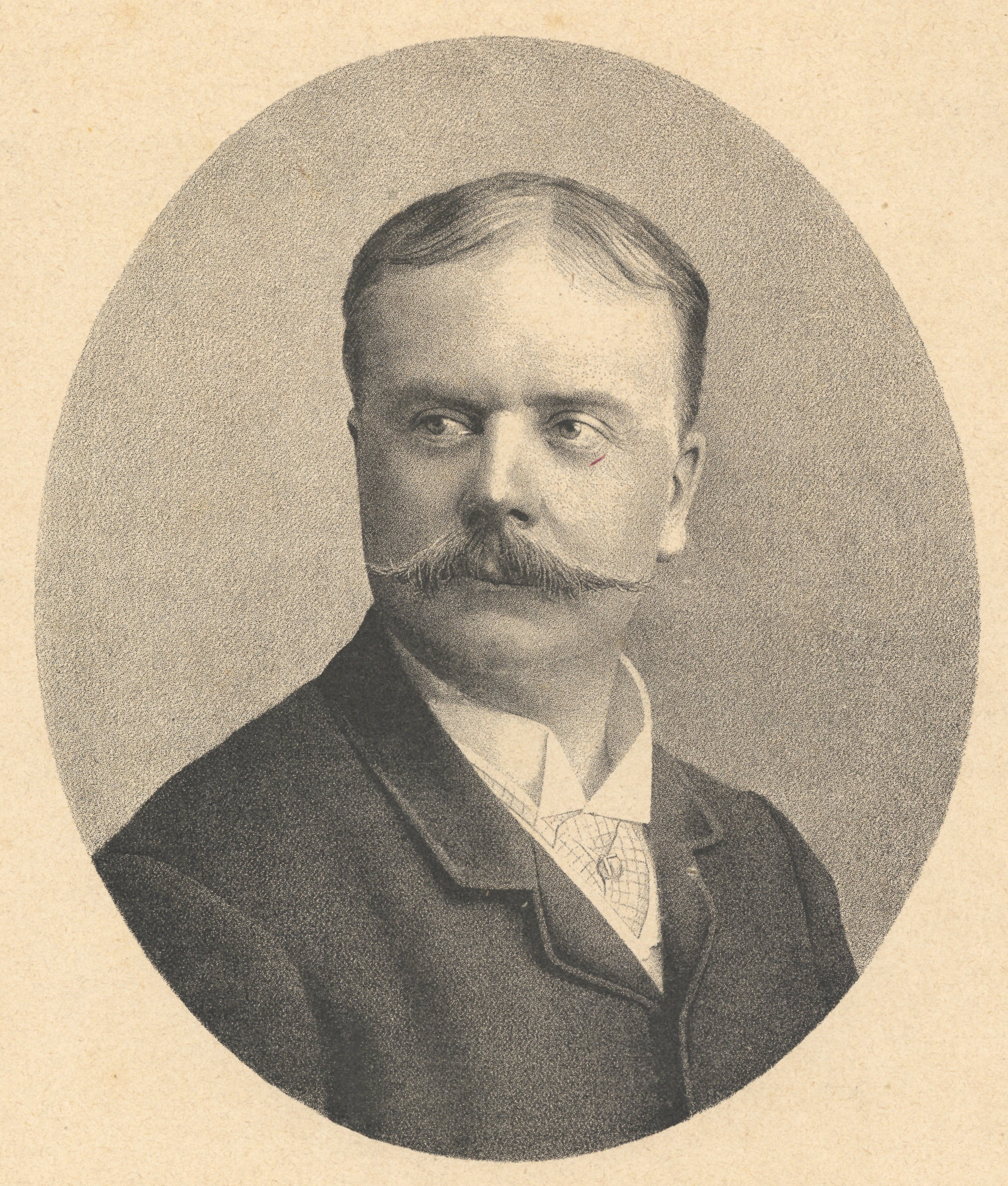
Henri Kowalski, c.1880

Henri Kowalski (April 1, 1841, in Paris, France – July 8, 1916, in Bordeaux, France) was a French pianist and composer. Born in Paris to a French mother and Polish father, Kowalski studied piano at the Paris Conservatoire with Michele Carafa and Samuel David; although he was asked to leave in 1860 for failure to attend regularly. His work includes the opera Gilles de Bretagne (1877). A regular traveller, he lived in Australia from 1885 to 1896. He published in 1872 his impressions of his travels in the United States, which includes a list of his musical compositions.

== Works ==
- Nuit Australienne
- Belles of Melbourne
