= Alfredo Leonardo Edel =

Italian painter and costume designer

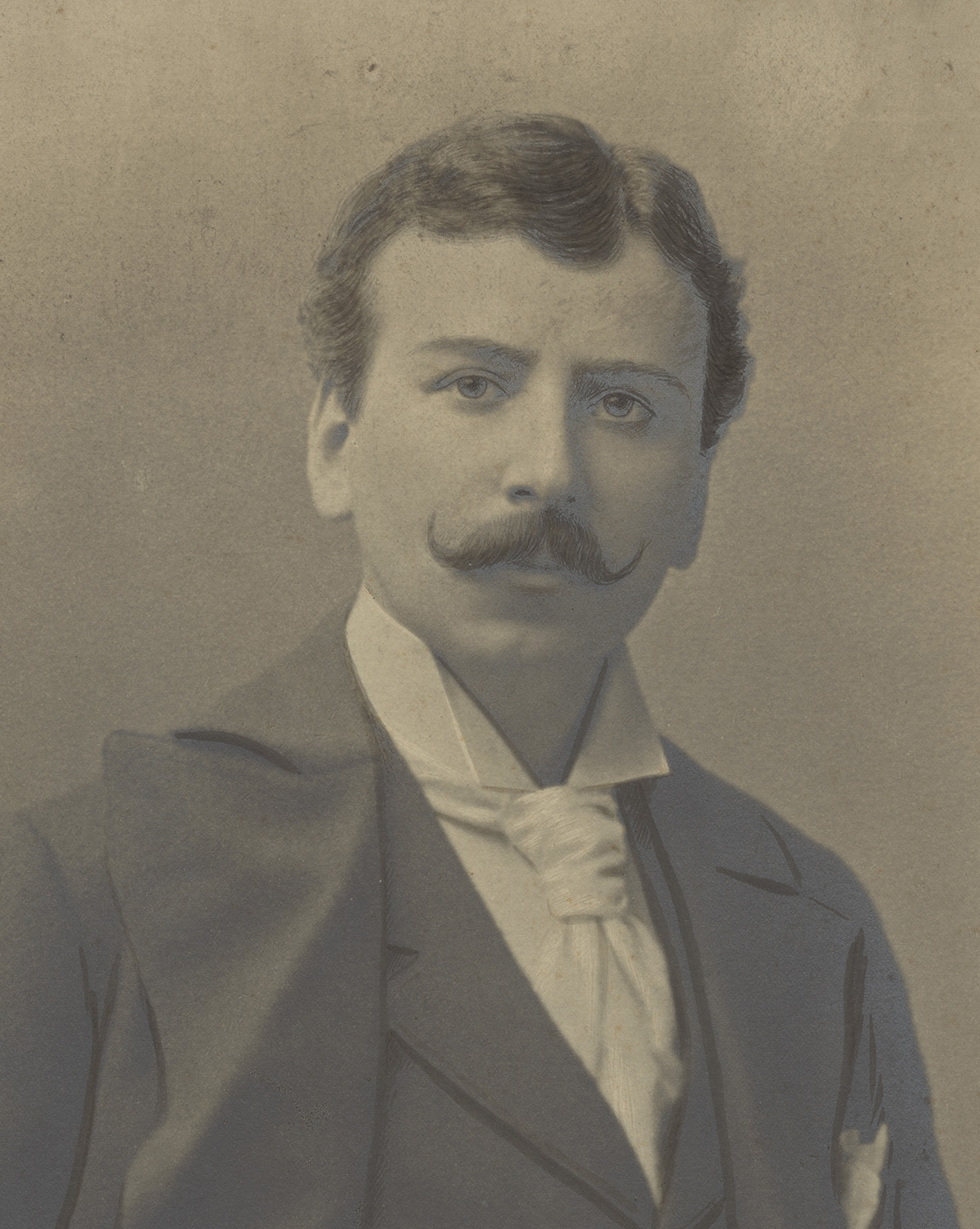
Alfredo Edel

Poster for Le mage, 1891

Alfredo Leonardo Edel (1856–1912), sometimes credited as Alfredo Edel Colorno, was an Italian costume designer popular during the late 19th and early 20th century.

Edel was born 15 May 1856 in Colorno, Italy, the son of Giuseppe and Clementina Naudin. His father was an amateur painter, his sister was a professional artist, and the family was descended from the miniaturist and royal painter Giuseppe Naudin (1792–1872). Early on, Edel studied under Pancrazio Soncini and set designer Girolamo Magnani.

He worked at the La Scala opera house in Milan where he became noted for his collaborations with Luigi Bartezago and Luigi Manzotti.

Edel designed costumes for theater productions and designed advertisements for operas and social events. Edel was in charge of color and costume theme for a spectacle titled "America" which was part of Chicago's Columbian Exposition in 1893. Edel's costumes were also featured at the Hippodrome in New York during 1904 after the artist traveled to the United States. The artist is best remembered for his harmonious and often bold color combinations and themes.

In 1890, Edel moved to Paris, France while also working in Milan and London. He was a founding member of the third Eccentric Club in London.

Edel was married to Fiorenza Parker. He died on 16 December 1912 in Boulogne-sur-Seine, France.

== Gallery ==
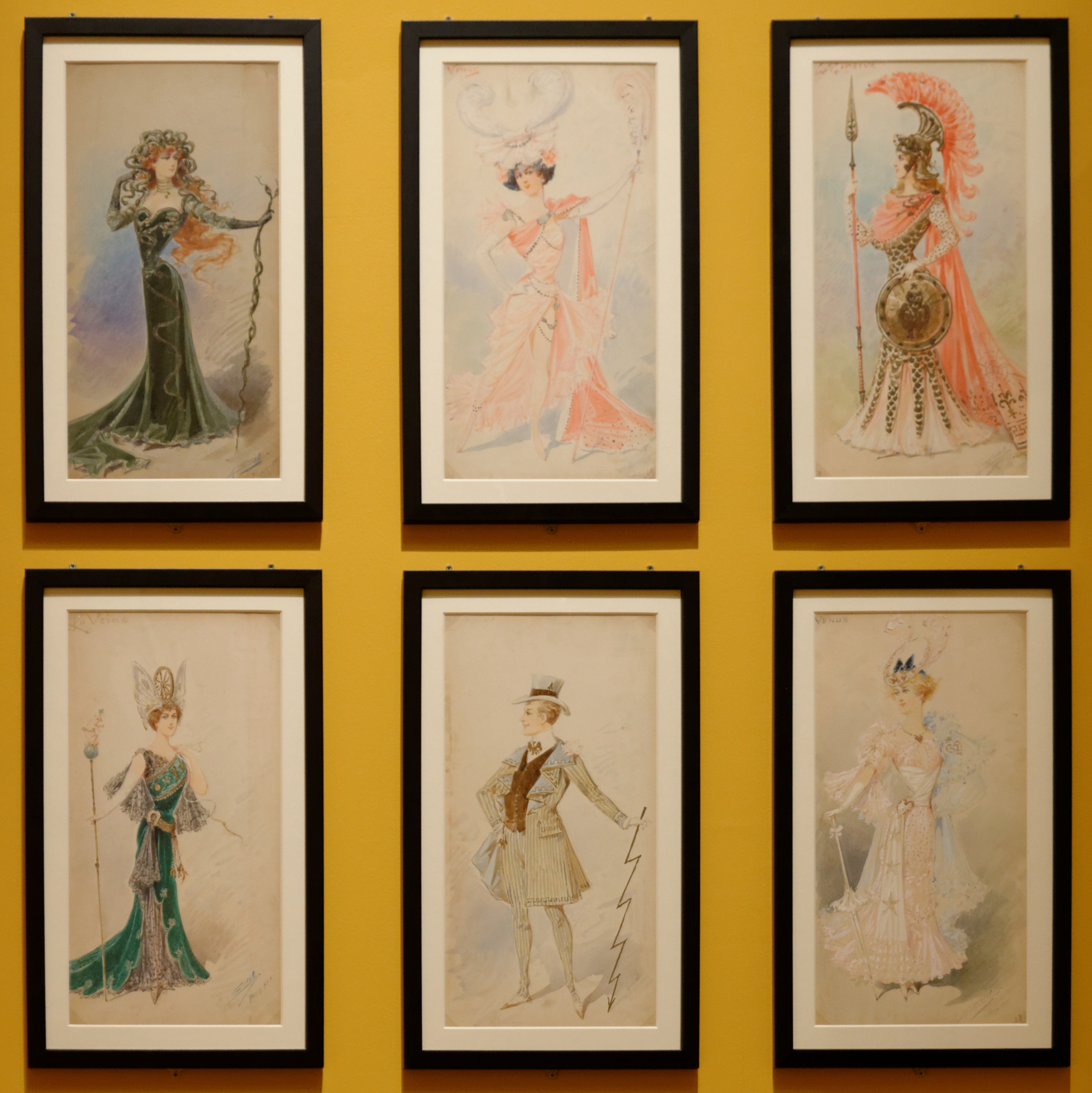
