= Henri Cain =

French dramatist, opera and ballet librettist

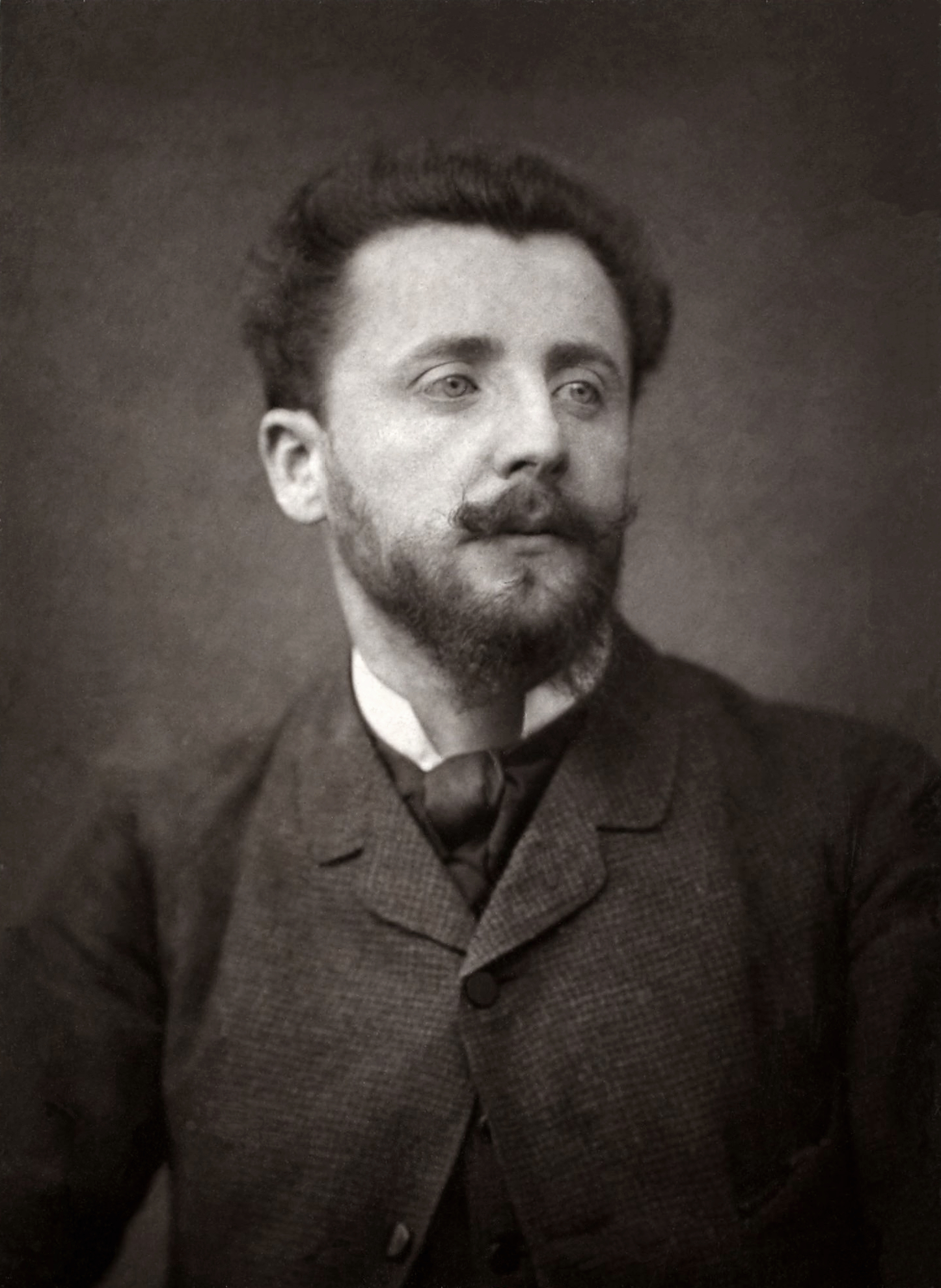
Henri Caïn in 1882

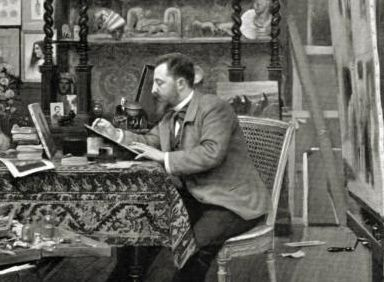
Portrait of the French dramatist and librettist Henri Cain sitting at his desk; published in the theatrical magazine Le Théâtre, July 1899

Henri Cain (11 October 1857 – 21 November 1937) was a French dramatist, opera and ballet librettist. He wrote over forty librettos from 1893 to his death, for many of the most prominent composers of the Parisian Belle Epoque.

Cain was born in Paris, the son of the sculptor Auguste Cain and brother of the painter Georges Cain. He studied painting in the studios of Jean-Paul Laurens and Édouard Detaille. He was married to the soprano Julia Guiraudon.

Close to Edouard de La Gandara, Jean Dara when he worked with Sarah Bernhardt, Henri Cain was an admirer of several major contemporary painters and sculptors such as Antonio de La Gandara and Jean Carriès.

Antar, with music by Gabriel Dupont can be heard on YouTube.

== Operas (and ballets) to librettos by Henri Cain ==
- Benjamin Godard

La vivandière (1893)

- Jules Massenet

La Navarraise (1894)
Sapho (1897)
Cendrillon (1899)
Cigale, ballet (1904)
Chérubin (1905)
Don Quichotte (1910)
Roma (1912)

- Camille Erlanger

Le juif polonais (1900)
Bacchus triomphant (1909)

- André Messager

Une aventure de la Guimard, ballet in one act (1900)

- Charles-Marie Widor

Les pêcheurs de Saint-Jean (1906)

- Umberto Giordano

Marcella (1909)

- Henry Février

Agnès dame galante (1912)
Carmosine (1913)
Gismonda (1919)

- Franco Alfano

Cyrano de Bergerac (1936)

- Jean Nouguès

Quo Vadis (1908)
