= Florian Sempey =

French operatic baritone

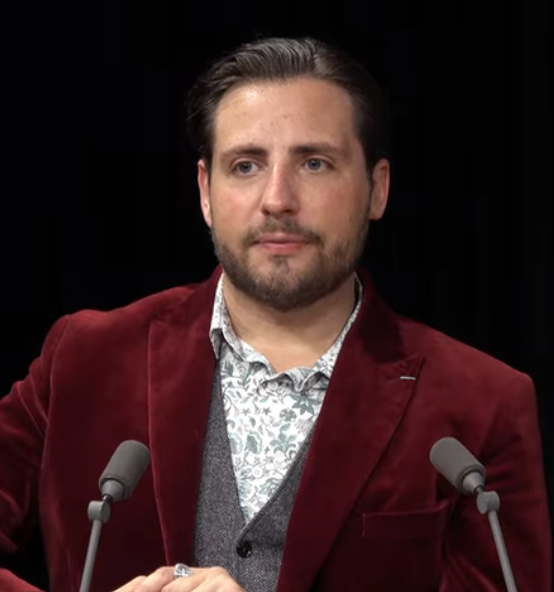
- In a 2026 interview
- Born: 29 January 1988 (age 38)
- Occupation: Opera singer

Florian Sempey (born 29 January 1988) is a French operatic baritone.

== Career ==
Florian Sempey studied piano and voice at the conservatoire in Libourne and then singing at the Bordeaux Conservatory. He made his debut at the age of 21 in the role of Papageno in Mozart's The Magic Flute at the Bordeaux Opera. He then entered the Atelier Lyrique, the young artists programme of the Paris Opera, for two years. He appeared as Figaro in Rossini's The Barber of Seville at the Paris Opera, a role which he also performed at the Royal Opera House, the Rossini Opera Festival in Pesaro, the Rome Opera and numerous other leading opera houses. He has also appeared at the Paris Opera in roles including Papageno, the Count of Nevers in Meyerbeer's Les Huguenots and Dandini in Rossini's La Cenerentola. He sang the role of Pollux in Rameau's Castor et Pollux at the Opéra-Comique in Paris, Valentin in Gounod's Faust with the Dutch National Opera, the title role in Ambroise Thomas' Hamlet and Alphonse XI in Donizetti's La Favorite at the Deutsche Oper Berlin and Enrico in the same composer's Lucia di Lammermoor at Opéra d'Avignon, as well as numerous other roles at leading opera houses. He regularly appears in a wide repertoire of concert performances both with solo piano and orchestra.

== Selected recordings ==
- Le mage, Massenet. CD:Ediciones Singulares 2013
- Dardanus, Rameau. DVD:Harmonia Mundi 2016
- Les pêcheurs de perles, Bizet. CD:Pentatone
- Figaro in The Barber of Seville, Rossini. DVD:Naxos Cat:2110592 2019
