= Messidor (opera) =

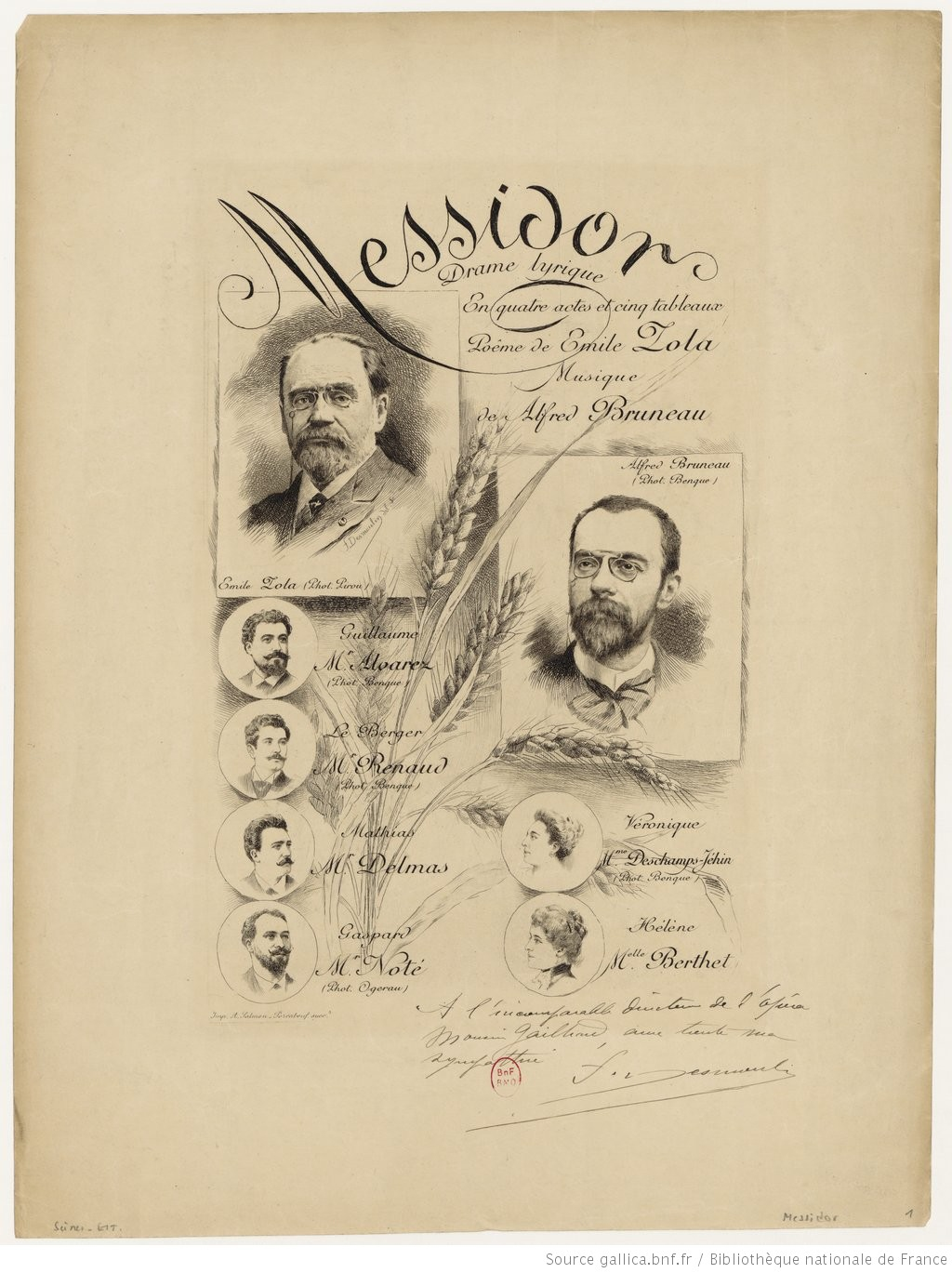
Title page Messidor

Messidor is a four-act operatic drame lyrique by Alfred Bruneau to a French libretto by Émile Zola. The opera premiered on 19 February 1897 in Paris. The opera title comes from the tenth month of the French Republican Calendar.

Although initially successful, the popularity of Messidor was adversely affected by the Dreyfus Affair which was occurring at the time of the opera's premiere. Because both Bruneau and his good friend Zola were active supporters of Alfred Dreyfus during his trial for treason, the French public did not welcome the composer's music for several years afterward. "Adieux du berger" and "Chanson du semeur" (from act II) and the prelude to act IV remained popular, though.

The collaborations between Bruneau and Zola, of which Messidor is the most notable, were considered an attempt at a French alternative to the Italian verismo movement in opera.

== Roles ==
Role	Voice type	Premiere Cast, 19 February 1897 (Conductor: Paul Taffanel)
Gaspard	bass	Jean Noté
Guillaume	tenor	Albert Alvarez
Mathias, Guillaume's cousin	baritone	Jean-François Delmas
Véronique, Guillaume's mother	mezzo-soprano	Blanche Deschamps-Jéhin
Hélène, Gaspard's daughter	soprano	Lucy Berthet
Le berger	tenor or baritone	Maurice Renaud
Le prêtre	tenor or bass	Gallois
Chorus: Peasants, workers, children, Rogation procession

== Synopsis ==
Set in Ariège, a region in the south-west of France, the opera tells the story of a greedy peasant, Gaspard, who has appropriated for himself a gold-bearing stream, which had previously provided income for the entire community. His daughter, Hélène, and Guillaume, a young and virtuous man, fall in love, but Guillaume's mother, Véronique, has accused Gaspard of murdering her husband. Ultimately Gaspard's mining operation fails, and his cousin Mathias is found to be the real murderer.

== Vocal score ==
The vocal score was published in 1897 and is now available online Messidor, at IMSLP.
