= La Terre Promise =

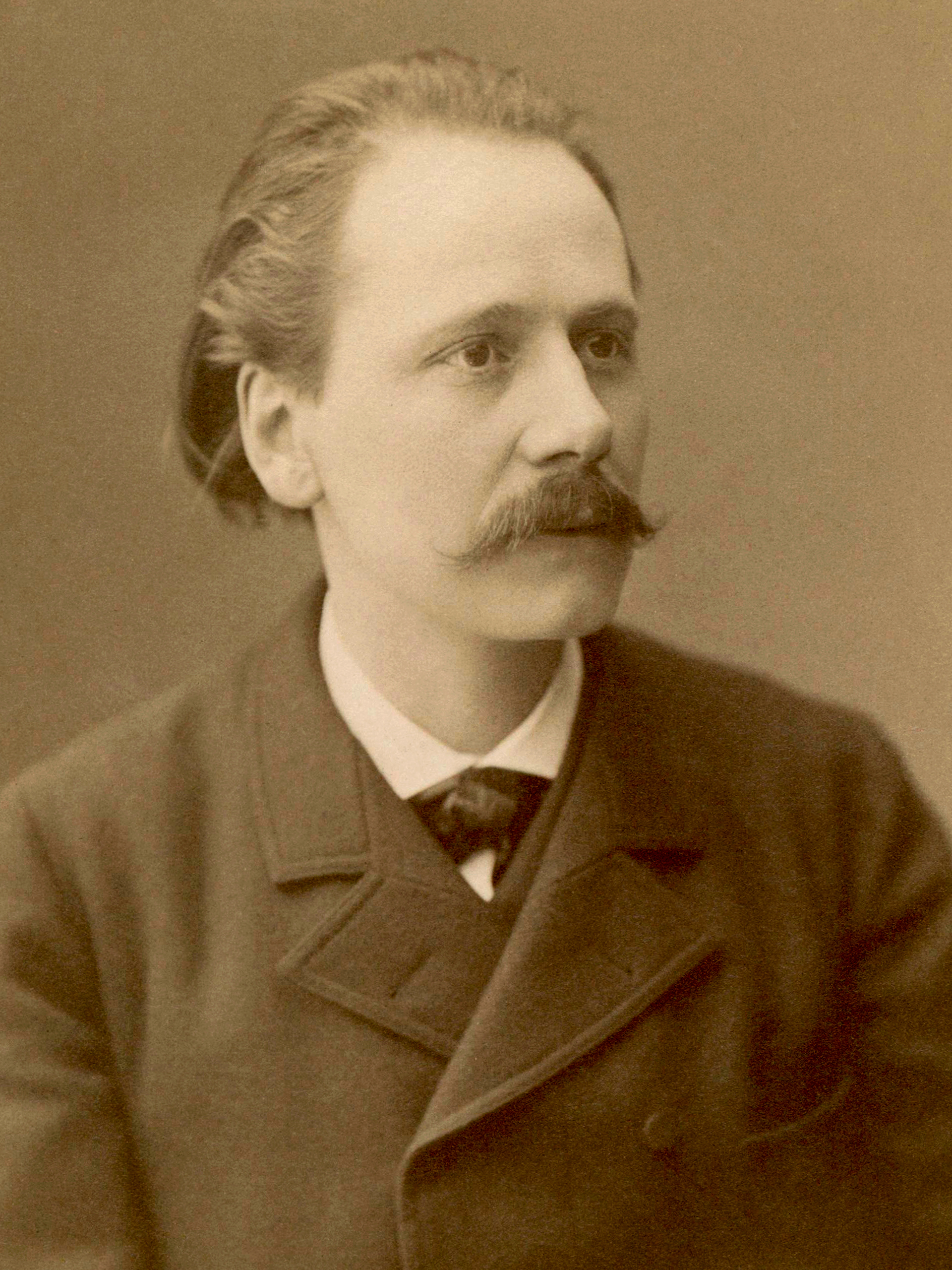
Jules Massenet in 1895

La Terre Promise is an oratorio in three parts by Jules Massenet to a French libretto by the composer based on the French translation of the Vulgate by Silvestre de Sacy. It was first performed at L'église Saint-Eustache in Paris on March 15, 1900, with Jean Noté, baritone, Lydia Nervil, soprano, and the orchestra and chorus totaling 400, directed by a former pupil of Massenet, Eugène d'Harcourt. The work was preceded at its first performance by the French premiere of Das Liebesmahl der Apostel (given as La dernière Cène des Apôtres).

The oratorio's three parts relate scenes from the Old Testament. The first part (Moab - L'Alliance) depicts Moses' pact with God: that the Jews will obey His law if He allows them passage across the river Jordan to the promised land. The second part (Jéricho - La Victoire) recounts the fall of Jericho, and in the third (Chanaan - La Terre Promise) the Jews reach Canaan and sing a hymn of praise to God.

In a rare modern performance La Terre Promise was part of the 1992 Massenet Festival, (with Laurent Naouri among the cast).
