= Alba Chrétien-Vaguet =

French operatic soprano

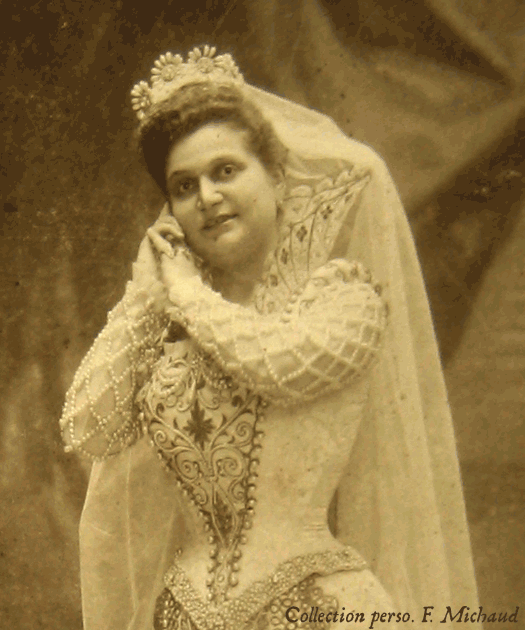
Chrétien-Vaguet as Valentine, in Les Huguenots, 1894.

Albertine Marie Chrétien-Vaguet (8 March 1872 – 28 February 1963) was a French operatic soprano.

Chrétien-Vaguet was born in Paris. She studied the piano at the Conservatoire de Paris and began her career at La Monnaie in Brussels in 1891.

Chrétien-Vaguet's first operatic appearance in Brussels was as Alice in Robert le Diable, (7 September 1891); she followed this with roles in le Rêve, Yolande by Magnard (creating the title role on 27 December 1892), and Charlotte in Werther. Her debut at the Paris Opéra was again as Alice in Robert le Diable on 31 July 1893, going on to sing in Lohengrin, Les Huguenots, la Walkyrie, Djelma, and the premiere of Deïdamie (1 December 1893).

She married Albert Vaguet (1865–1943), a tenor of the Opéra de Paris, with whom she had sung in the première of Deïdamie, on 30 June 1894 in Paris.

Chrétien-Vaguet sang Thanastô in the first (concert) performance of Chabrier's Briséïs on 13 January 1897, as well as in the first French staged performance on 8 May 1899 (in which her husband sang Hylas).

She took part in concerts given by the Société des Concerts du Conservatoire in February 1894 (Le Paradis et la Péri by Schumann, with Vaguet also taking part), and January and February 1901 (excerpts from Armide by Gluck). She died, aged 90, in Nay, near Pau.
