= Laurent Campellone =

- Born: January 23, 1972 (age 54); Ollioules, France
- Genres: Classical music
- Occupations: Conductor, General Manager of the Opéra de Tours
- Website: https://www.laurent-campellone.com

Laurent Campellone (born January 23, 1972) is a French conductor.
Known around the world for his expertise in the French opera of the Romantic era, he is often compared to Michel Plasson. Critics consider him today as "one of the best defenders in the world" of this repertoire.
He is currently the General Manager of Opéra de Tours.

== Biography ==
=== Studies ===
Campellone first studied violin, tuba, percussion and singing. While completing his Philosophy studies, he trained as a conductor at the Conservatoire Frédéric Chopin in Paris. In 2001, he was awarded, by unanimous vote, the First Prize at the 8th edition of the EU Young Conductors international Competition, in Spoleto, Italy.

=== Guest conductor ===
Campellone has conducted over 300 different orchestra and lyric works in prestigious opera houses and with renowned orchestras, amongst which the Bolshoi of Moscow, where he made his debut in 2012 with a new production of La Traviata staged by Francesca Zambello; the Deutsche Oper Berlin; the Théatre national de l’Opéra Comique, the Opéra national de Lorraine; the Monte Carlo Opera; the Bavarian Radio Symphony Orchestra; the Radio-France Philharmonic Orchestra; the Brazilian Symphony Orchestra; the Toulouse Capitole National Orchestra and the Malaysian Philharmonic Orchestra. He is also a regular guest conductor at the Berlioz Festival, the La Chaise-Dieu Festival and other French festivals.

=== Director ===
==== Opéra de Saint-Etienne ====
From 2004 to 2015, Campellone was music director of the Opéra de Saint-Etienne. During his term, he carried on the Opera's policy of rediscovering forgotten 19th century French masterpieces, thus conducting many rare lyric works by Massenet (Le Mage, Le Jongleur de Notre Dame, Sapho, Ariane...), Gounod (Polyeucte, La Reine de Saba), Lalo (Le Roi d’Ys) and Saint-Saëns (Les Barbares), a repertoire in which he has been said to "have no equals". This passion for the lesser-known parts of the French romantic repertoire did not preclude his offering noted interpretations of such operatic staples as Madama Butterfly or Rigoletto.

==== Opéra de Tours ====
In September 2020, he was appointed General manager and music director of the Opéra de Tours. His first season (2021), which was commended for its quality and novelty, breathed new life into a house that had suffered greatly from years of mismanagement and from the COVID-19 pandemic. Continuing his exploration of the French repertoire, he conducted the first stagings of Saint-Saëns' La Princesse Jaune and Bizet's Djamileh after years of neglect. He is also the first to hire formally Glass Marcano, the first black woman conductor in France: she is principal guest conductor for the 2022 season.

== Discography ==
Among his recordings, three were particularly acclaimed by the critics :

- Massenet: Le Mage, Bru-Zane, 2013
- Saint-Saëns: Les Barbares, Bru-Zane, 2014
- Offenbach: Offenbach Colorature, Alpha-Classics, 2019 awarded Diapason d'Or of the year.
- Massenet : Ariane, Bru-Zane, 2023. Diapason d’or

== Honors ==
- Prix de la personnalité musicale de l'année du Syndicat de la critique (2014)
- Officier des Arts et des Lettres
