= Patrie! =

1886 French-language opera by Émile Paladilhe

- Opera by Émile Paladilhe
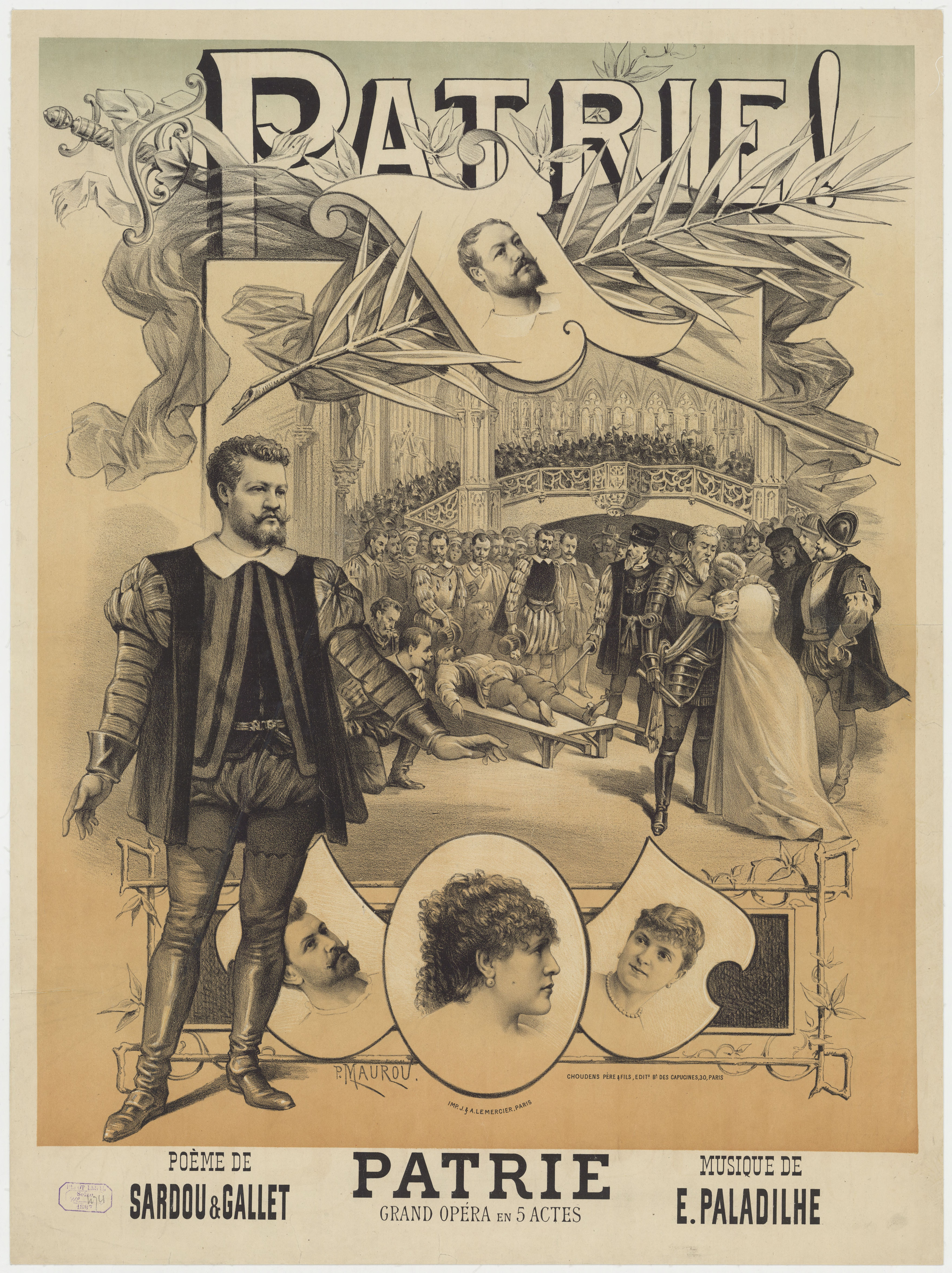
- Poster for the 1886 premiere
- Librettist: Victorien Sardou, Louis Gallet
- Language: French
- Based on: Patrie! (1869 play by Sardou)
- Premiere: 16 December 1886; Opéra Garnier

Patrie! is an 1886 French-language opera in five acts by Émile Paladilhe with a libretto by Victorien Sardou and Louis Gallet based on the play by Sardou about a 16th-century revolt of Flemish nobles in Brussels. The opera was Paladilhe's greatest popular success and was one of the last in the style of grand opera to premiere at the Paris Opéra.

== Performance history ==
The opera was premiered on 16 December 1886 by the Opéra at the Palais Garnier in Paris. The mise-en-scène was by Pedro Gailhard, and the choreography, by Louis Merante. The opera was last performed at the Garnier on 9 August 1919, its 93rd performance.

The opera has also been performed outside of France, in Prague (28 April 1887, in Czech), Ghent (25 January 1888), Antwerp (6 March 1888), Rome (23 November 1889, in Italian), Hamburg (1 January 1890, in German), Amsterdam (1 September 1898, in Dutch), Geneva (19 February 1901), and Brussels (10 September 1931).

== Roles ==
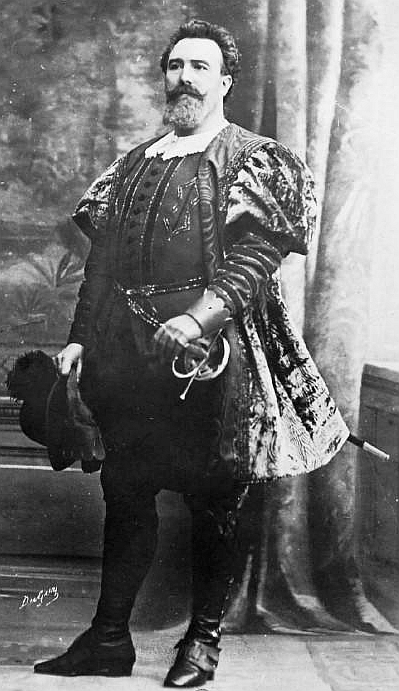
Francisque Delmas as the Count of Rysoor in the Paris revival of 1907

| Role | Voice type | Premiere cast, 16 December 1886 Conductor: Jules Garcin |
|---|---|---|
| Delorès | soprano | Gabrielle Krauss |
| Rafaela | soprano | Rosa Bosman |
| Count of Rysoor | baritone | Jean Lassalle |
| Karloo | tenor | Valentin Duc |
| Duke of Alba | bass | Édouard de Reszke |
| La Trémoïlle | tenor | Muratet |
| Jonas | baritone | Bérardi |
| Noircarmès | bass | Auguste Dubulle |
| Rincon | bass | Sentein |
| Vargas | tenor | Étienne Sapin |
| Delrio | bass | Crépeaux |

== Recordings ==
- "Pauvre martyr obscur", sung by the baritone Rysoor
- "Ah! Maintenant à moi!..., duet of Dolorès & Rysoor
