= Tours Opera =

- Opéra de Tours
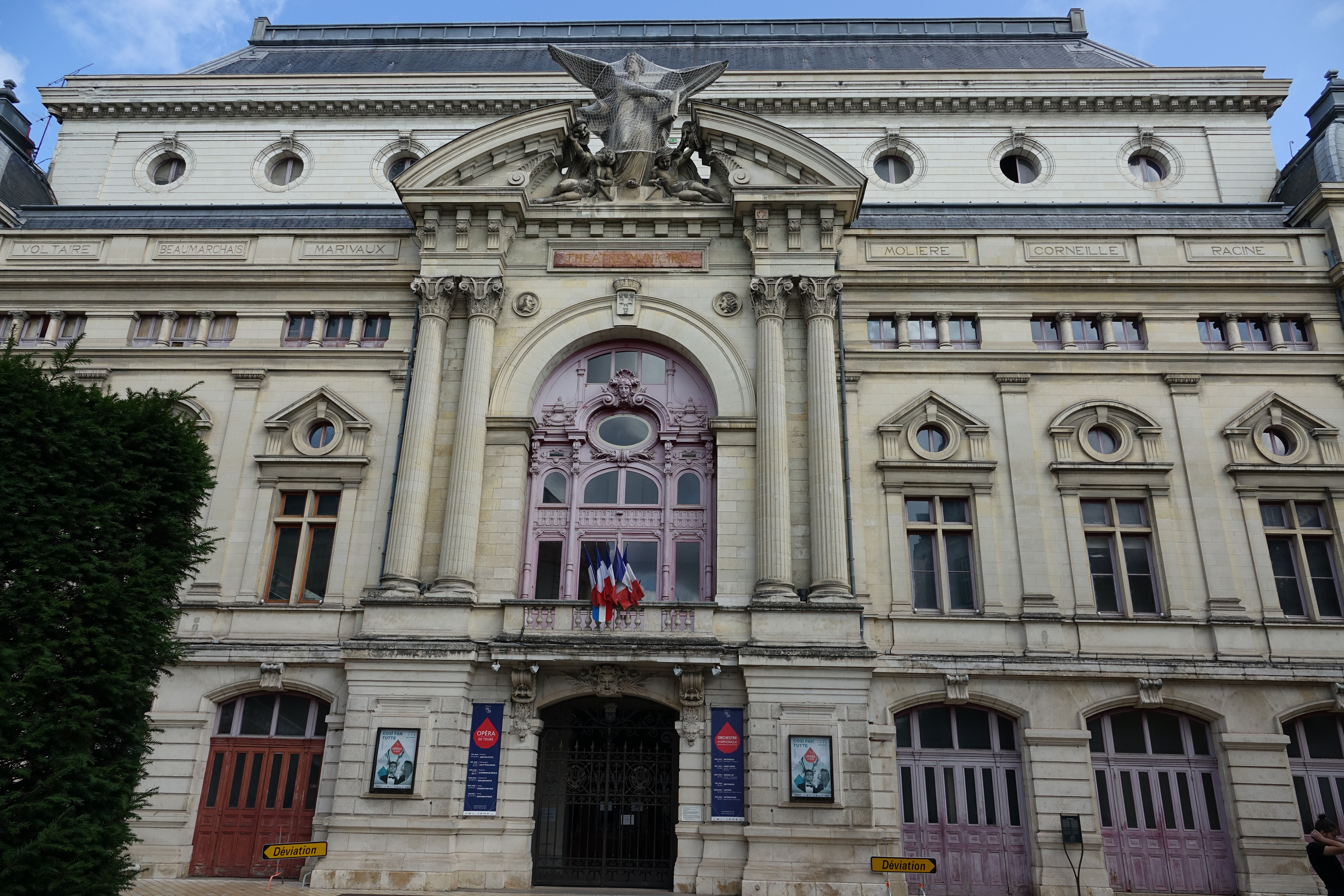
- Southern façade of the Grand Théâtre
- Type: Opera company
- Location: Tours, France
- Website: operadetours.fr

The Tours Opera (French: Opéra de Tours, French pronunciation: [ɔpeʁa də tuʁ]) is an opera company in Tours, France. It is housed in the Grand Théâtre de Tours, which is its main performance venue. The company administers a choir and the Orchestre Symphonique région Centre-Val de Loire/Tours. Laurent Campellone is its general manager since 2020.

== History ==
In 1791, during the selling of the biens nationaux, citizen Bucheron acquired the Cordeliers' Church and transformed it into a 800 seats theatre that opened in 1796. At the beginning, both operas (Mozart, Rossini…) and plays (Molière, Marivaux...) where performed. As numerous projects for a new municipal venue were abandoned due to a lack of resources, the city decided to buy Bucheron's theater in 1867. Leon Rohard supervised the renovation and achieved a modern building that burned to the ground eleven years after the inauguration. Following a competition in which Charles Garnier was a member of the jury, Jean-Marie Hardion and Stanislas Loison were commissioned by the municipality. Equipped to accommodate 973 spectators, the theater known today as the Grand Théâtre de Tour, opened in 1889. The Grand théâtre, adapting its schedule, remained open for much of both world wars and saw a peak of activity during the années folles.

== Programming ==
The Tours Opera produces, on average, six operas each season, hosts recitals with renowned artists, and offers over 30 symphonic concerts both in Tours and in the greater region.
