= Wilhelm Benque =

French photographer (1843–1903)

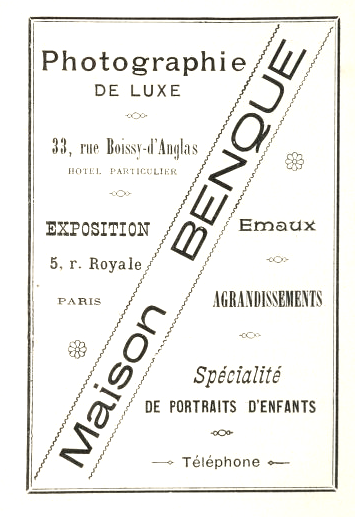
Advertisement for the Maison Benque from 1897.

Wilhelm Benque (1843-1903) was a French portrait photographer of German origin, belonging to an important dynasty of photographers, the Benques.

== Biography ==
Wilhelm Benque, known as "the Younger", descended from a family from Ludwigslust (Mecklenburg, Germany). His uncle, the landscape designer Wilhelm Friedrich Alexander Benque (1814-1895), had a younger brother, Christian Benque (1811-1883) whose son, Franz Benque (1841-1921) became a photographer, first in Hamburg (1869-1870), then in Brazil (from 1878) before finally settling in Trieste. From the 1880s onwards, the Benques represented a dynasty of photographers, with a presence on three continents. When Wilhelm Benque arrived in Paris, he was associated with one of the members of the Benque family, Franz Wilhelm Benque (1857-1912), son of the landscape photographer Wilhelm Benque.

In the 1880s and 1890s, the Benques established their studio in Paris at 33, rue Boissy-d'Anglas under the name Benque, Benque et Cie. A successful venture, they occupied a private mansion at this address, targeted a luxury clientele, and even opened an exhibition store at 5 rue Royale.

In the meantime, the company joined forces with two other photographers, named Klary (?-?) and Kneubuhler (1816-1880), and the name became Benque & Klary for a time until it was taken over by Matuszewski after 1902.

The Benques also opened a second studio in Nice around 1883-1884.

Benque was particularly active with personalities linked to the world of opera and the Parisian stage. They took well-known photographs of Louise Abbéma, Valentin Duc, Eleonora Duse and Cléopâtre-Diane de Mérode when she was promoted to "grand sujet" among the ballerinas in 1896.

The Benque studios enjoyed an international reputation by the end of the 19th century.
