= Roma (opera) =

Opera by Jules Massenet

- Opera by Jules Massenet
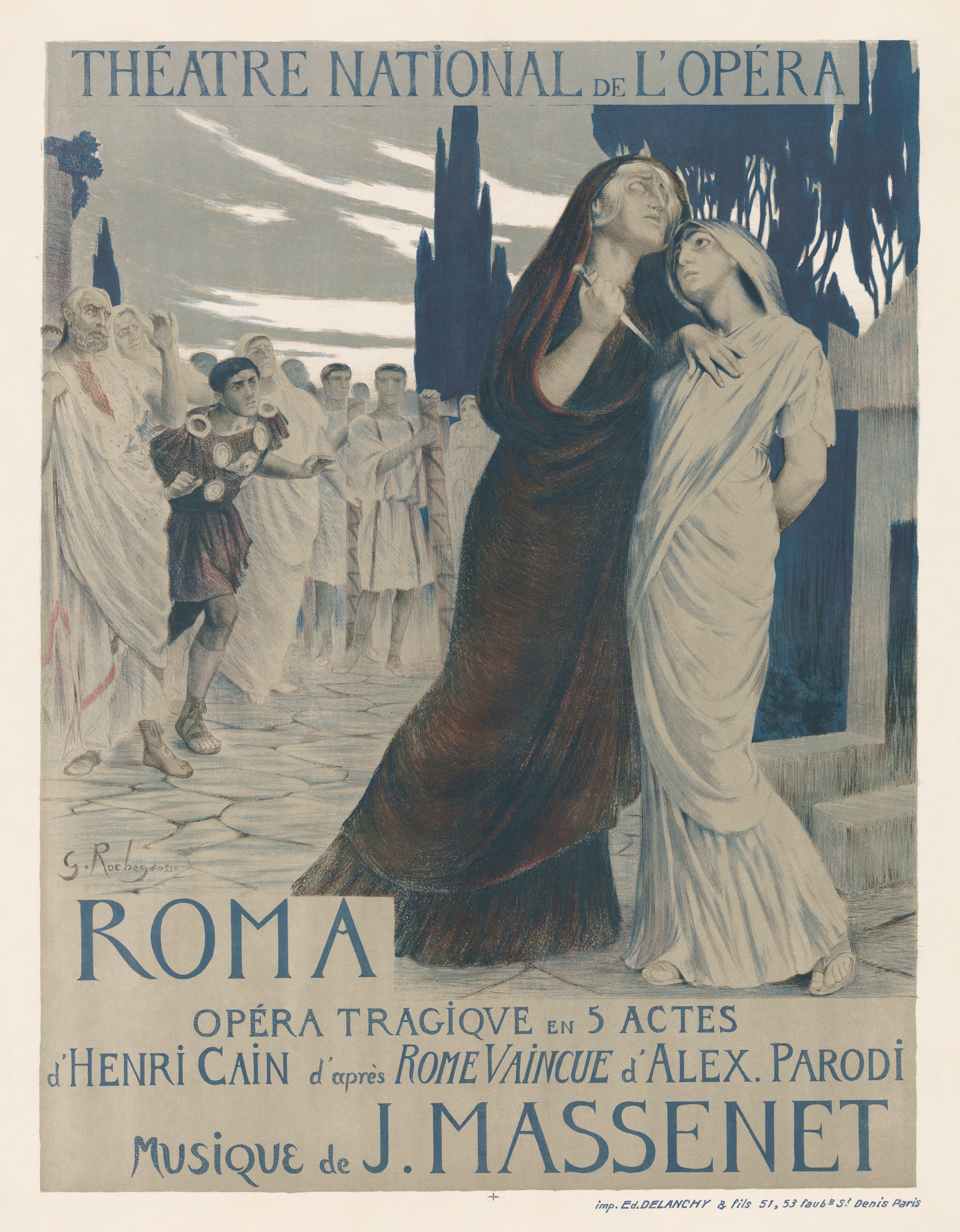
- Poster by Georges Rochegrosse for the Paris première
- Librettist: Henri Cain
- Language: French
- Based on: Rome vaincue by Dominique-Alexandre_Parodi
- Premiere: 17 February 1912; Opéra de Monte Carlo

Roma is an opera in five acts by Jules Massenet to a French libretto by Henri Cain based on the play Rome vaincue by Dominique-Alexandre Parodi. It was first performed at the Opéra de Monte Carlo on 17 February 1912.

Roma was the last opera by Massenet to premiere in his lifetime. Three operas were subsequently premiered posthumously: Panurge (1913), Cléopâtre (1914) and Amadis (1922). The piece has not survived into the modern operatic repertoire, but has been revived recently and recorded by the Teatro la Fenice in Venice.

== Roles ==
Role	Voice type	Premiere Cast, 17 February 1912 (Conductor: Léon Jehin)
Lentulus	tenor	Lucien Muratore
Fabius Maximus	baritone	Jean-François Delmas
Fausta	soprano	Maria Nikolaevna Kuznetsova
Lucius Cornélius	bass	Pierre Clauzure
Posthumia	contralto	Lucy Arbell
Junia	soprano	Julia Guiraudon
Vestapor	baritone	Jean Noté
The Grand Vestal	soprano	Éliane Peltier
Galla	soprano	Doussot
Caïus	baritone	Kozline/Skano
An old man	baritone	Gasparini
Chorus: Senators, Priests, Vestal virgins, people.

== Synopsis ==
The story takes place in ancient Rome, following the Carthaginian triumph at the Battle of Cannae. Fausta, daughter of Fabius, has allowed the sacred fires to burn out at the Temple of Vesta, profaning the sanctuary. After failed attempts to escape her fate, to be buried alive wrapped in a black veil, Fausta returns to Rome to accept her punishment. As she is being led to execution, her blind grandmother, Posthumia, hands her Fabius' dagger. Fausta's hands are bound, however, and Posthumia must kill her granddaughter to spare her from the burial and expiate the sacrilege.
