= Jean Noté =

Belgian operatic baritone (1858–1922)

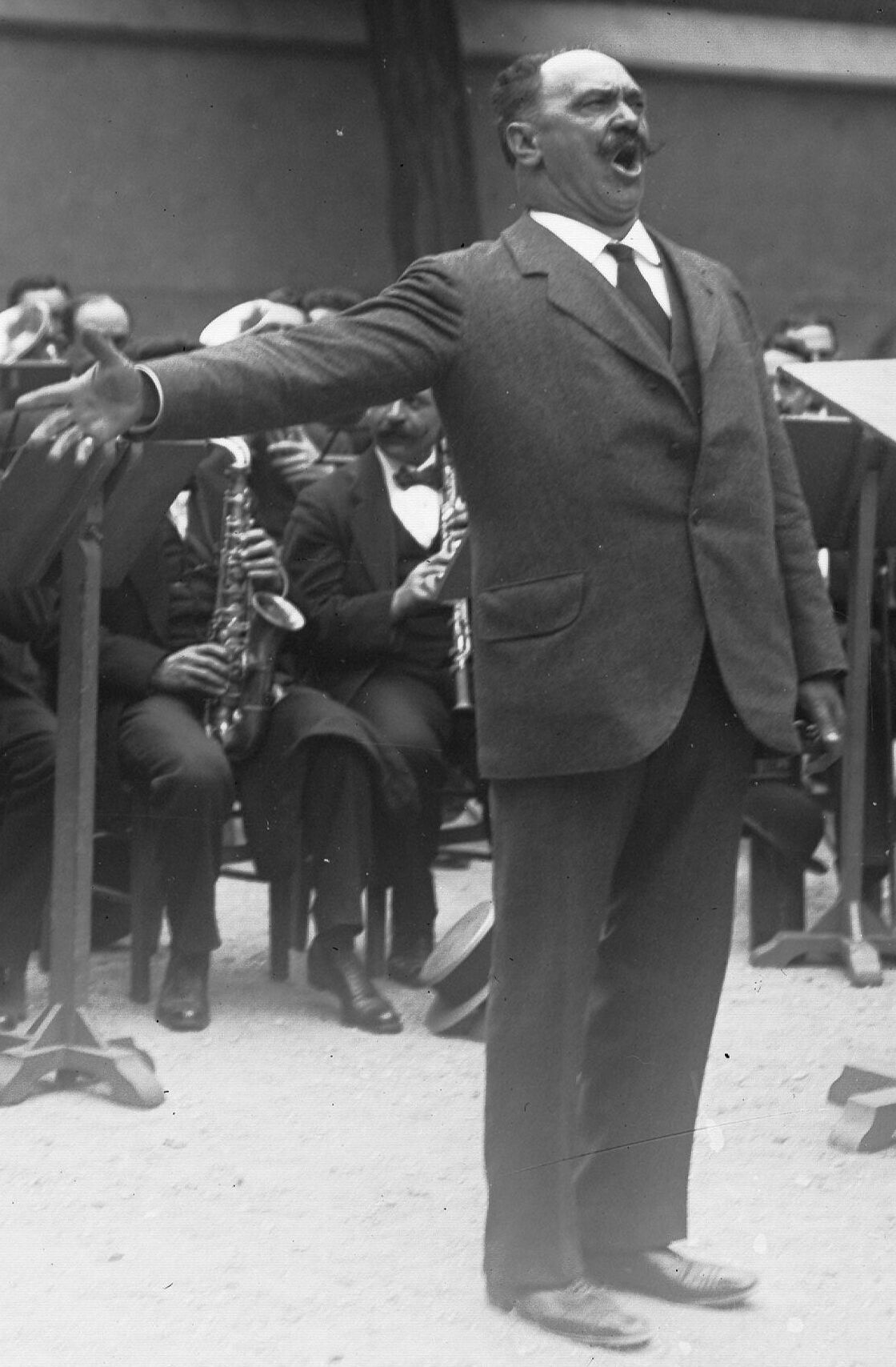
- Jean Noté in 1915

Background information
- Born: 6 May 1858; Tournai, Belgium
- Died: 1 April 1922 (aged 63); Brussels, Belgium
- Genres: Opera (Classical music)
- Occupation: Opera singer (Baritone)

Jean-Baptiste Noté (6 May 1858 in Tournai – 1 April 1922 in Brussels) was a Belgian operatic baritone. He graduated from the Royal Conservatory of Ghent in 1884 with first prizes in singing and lyrical declamation. He made his professional opera debut in 1885 at the Opéra de Lille as Lord Enrico Ashton in Gaetano Donizetti's Lucia di Lammermoor. From 1887–1889 he was committed to the Théatre Royal in Antwerp. He then became a member of the Opéra National de Lyon where he had major success in the operas of Richard Wagner; especially the parts of Friedrich of Telramund in Lohengrin and Wolfram von Eschenbach in Tannhäuser. He was also admired at that theatre as Roland in Jules Massenet's Esclarmonde. He left Lyon in 1893 to join the roster of principal artists at the Paris Opera where he remained for the rest of his career. He made his debut in Paris in the title role of Giuseppe Verdi's Rigoletto. He continued to perform with that company up until his death.

He sang in the premiere of Massenet's La Terre Promise in 1900, as well as the composer's Roma and Bruneau's Messidor.

He made many gramophone records in the early years of recordings. These covered operatic roles and melodies and included the death of Valentin from Faust, the Air du toréador from Carmen, 'Vision fugitive' from Hérodiade, the Chanson bachique from Hamlet, La Marseillaise, 'Adamastor, roi des vagues' from L'Africaine, 'Lorsqu'à de folles amours' from La Traviata, 'Sois immobile' from Guillaume Tell and 'Pour faire un brave Mousquetaire' from Les Mousquetaires au couvent. Songs he recorded include Les rameaux and Charité by Fauré, Le soir and Prière by Gounod and Noël païen and Pensée d'automne by Massenet.

Noté singing "La Marseillaise" in 1907
