= Le Mage =

Opera by Jules Massenet

- Opera by Jules Massenet
- Poster by Alfredo Edel, 1891.
- Librettist: Jean Richepin
- Language: French
- Premiere: 16 March 1891; Paris Opéra

Le Mage ("the Magus") is an opera in five acts by Jules Massenet to a French libretto by Jean Richepin. It was first performed at the Paris Opéra in Paris on 16 March 1891 in costumes by Charles Bianchini and sets by Auguste Alfred Rubé, Philippe Chaperon and Marcel Jambon (Act I), Amable and Eugène Gardy (Act II), Alfred Lemeunier (Act III), and Jean-Baptiste Lavastre and Eugène Carpezat (Acts IV and V).

Since its premiere run of 31 performances Le Mage has been rarely performed (it was seen in The Hague in 1896), and it is one of Massenet's least known operas. However, it falls squarely in the middle of his most productive period. A rare complete concert performance took place in Saint-Étienne in 2012.

One writer described Zarastra as "one of the most fiendish roles Massenet ever conceived for tenor", adding that the composer "covers all the ground required by a commission from the Opéra, with solos and ensembles, a ballet and spectacular scenic effects. The massive concertato that concludes the second act shows that the composer could still encompass the grand manner, while the duet for Varedha and Amrou, with its Verdian colouring, must have been a real crowd-pleaser".

== Roles ==
Role	Voice type	Premiere cast, 16 March 1891 (Conductor: Auguste Vianesi)
Anahita	soprano	Maria Lureau-Escalaïs
Varedha	mezzo-soprano	Caroline Fiérens-Peters
Zarastra	tenor	Edmond Vergnet
Amrou	baritone	Jean-François Delmas
Le roi d'Iran	bass	Jean Martapoura
Touranien prisoner	tenor	Agustarello Affre
Iranian chief	bass	Voulet
Herald	bass	Charles Douaillier
Touranien chief	bass	Ragneau
A ballerina		Rosita Mauri

== Synopsis ==
=== Act 1 ===
At dawn in the camp of the Persian general Zarastra

Zarastra has just defeated the Turanians. Amrou, Persian high priest to the Daevas (the supposed gods of pre-Zoroastrian Persia), enters with his daughter, Varedha, priestess of Djahi, goddess of love. Varedha declares her love for Zarastra. He however loves the captive Turanian queen, Anahita; she is in love with him but rejects him rather than betray her countrymen.

=== Act 2 ===
Scene 1: In a subterranean chamber in the Djahi temple

Amrou enters looking for Varedha, and promises vengeance on Zarastra for spurning his daughter.

Scene 2: In the square of Balzhdi

Zarastra, hailed by the courtiers and priests, presents before the Persian king the treasures and captives he has taken. As the prize of his victory he requests to take as wife Anahita. Amrou objects to the union – Zarastra promised to marry Varedha. Although the general denies this, Amrou convinces everyone that he has broken his word, and Zarastra is banished.

=== Act 3 ===
On a holy mountain – sacred to the god of fire

Zarastra is worshiped now as a magus, and prays. His meditation is broken by Varedha who has pursued him to the mountain and swears her love for him. She finally says that Anahita is about to marry the king.

=== Act 4 ===
The temple of Djahi

There are dances in preparation for the wedding. But Anahita refuses to marry the king, who nonetheless tries to proceed with the ceremony. Anahita threatens an uprising, and Touranian soldiers burst in and overrun the city.

=== Act 5 ===
The ruins of Balzdhi

Zarastra is devastated and walks in the ruins. He finds the bodies of the king and the high priest. He does not find the body of his beloved. At a fanfare and Anahita enters and repeats her love for Zarastra. Varedha comes to and, seeing the couple, curses them. Flames re-ignite, but a prayer by Zarastra moves the god Ahura Mazda to stop the flames so that the lovers may leave the temple. Varedha expires.

== Recordings ==
- Le Mage – Catherine Hunold (soprano) Anahita, Kate Aldrich (mezzo-soprano) Varedha, Luca Lombardo (tenor) Zarâstra, Jean-François Lapointe (baritone) Amrou, Marcel Vanaud (baritone) Le Roi d'Iran, Julien Dran (tenor) prisonnier Touranien, Florian Sempey (baritone) Chef Touranien. Opéra-Théâtre de Saint-Étienne dir. Laurent Campellone, concert performance 11 November 2012, sponsored Palazzetto Bru Zane. 2CDs Ediciones Singulares 2013.

Arias:

- "Ah! Parais!": Agustarello Affré, (Pathé 1903).
- "Soulève l'ombre de ses voiles" (Act 3): Edmond Clément, Orchestre, (Pathé recording, 1919)
