= Enrico Bartezago =

Italian painter (1849– c. 1937)

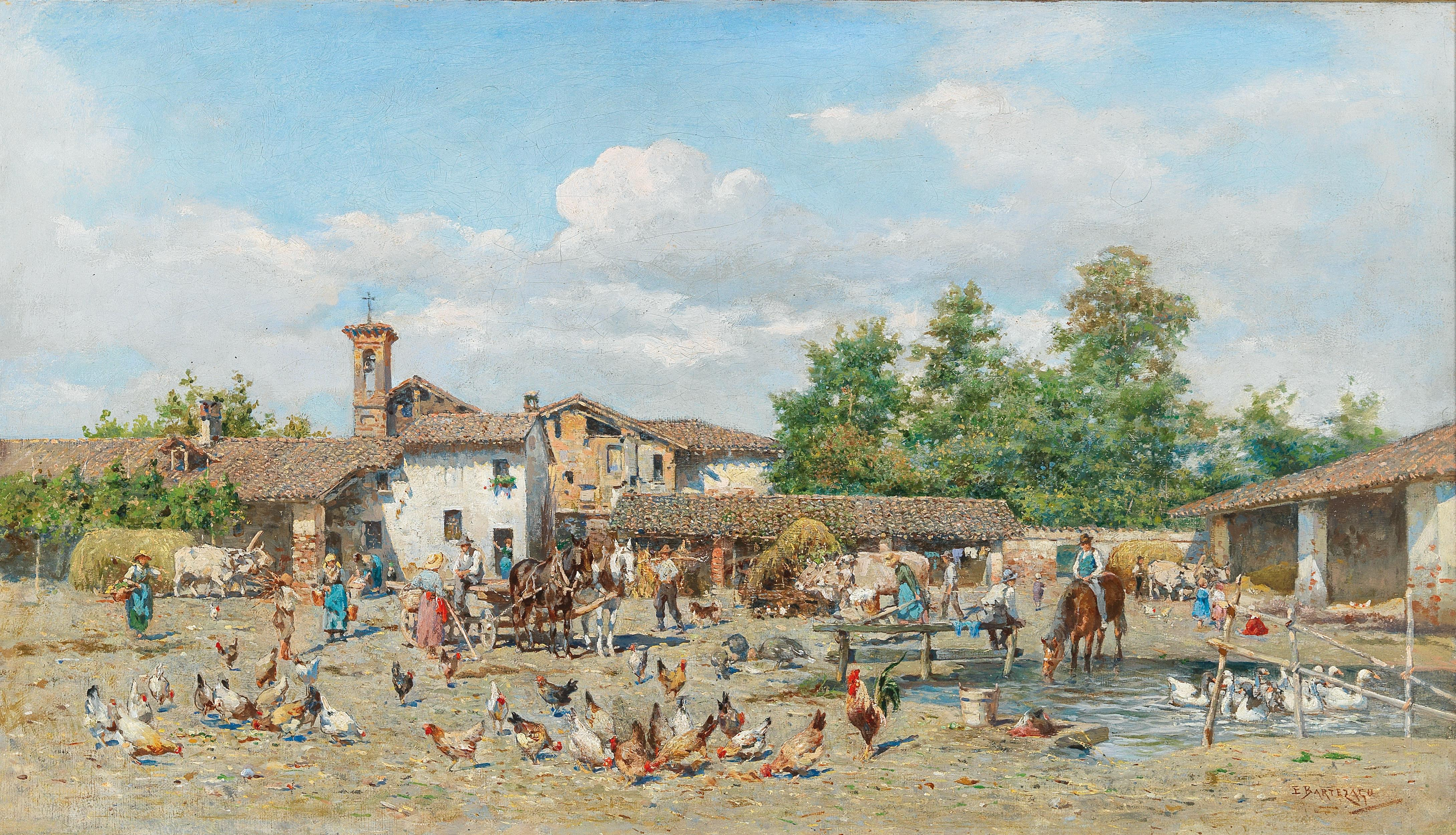
Colourful Village Life (oil on canvas)

Enrico Bartezago (Lugano, 1849 – c. 1937) was an Italian painter, active in Milan, painting genre scenes, Portraits, and watercolors. In the exhibition of Paris of 1878, he displayed L' aia d' una fattoria lombarda. At the Mostra di Venezia of 1887, he exhibited La scimmia. Other works include Mercato a Varallo and Nemici. In 1891–92, he won the Mylius prize from the Academy at Milan for genre painting for his Alpine Pennine.

His twin brother Luigi Bartezago (he appears to have also died the same year) was a painter, lithographer, photographer, and costume designer for the Teatro La Scala of Milan starting in the 1870s. It is said that he also signed his vedute as Bartezaghi, Battezzati. He painted in the style of Luigi Bisi. He exhibited at the Brera Academy from 1851 to 1894, with works such as Veduta di S. Lorenzo in Milano, presa dalla Vetra (1851); L'interno della chiesa di Sant'Alessandro in Milano (1853), Veduta dell'Albergo di Bellagio (1851), and Veduta del Palazzo ducale di Venezia, con temporale (1862).
