= Les barbares =

Opera by Camille Saint-Saëns

- tragédie lyrique by Camille Saint-Saëns
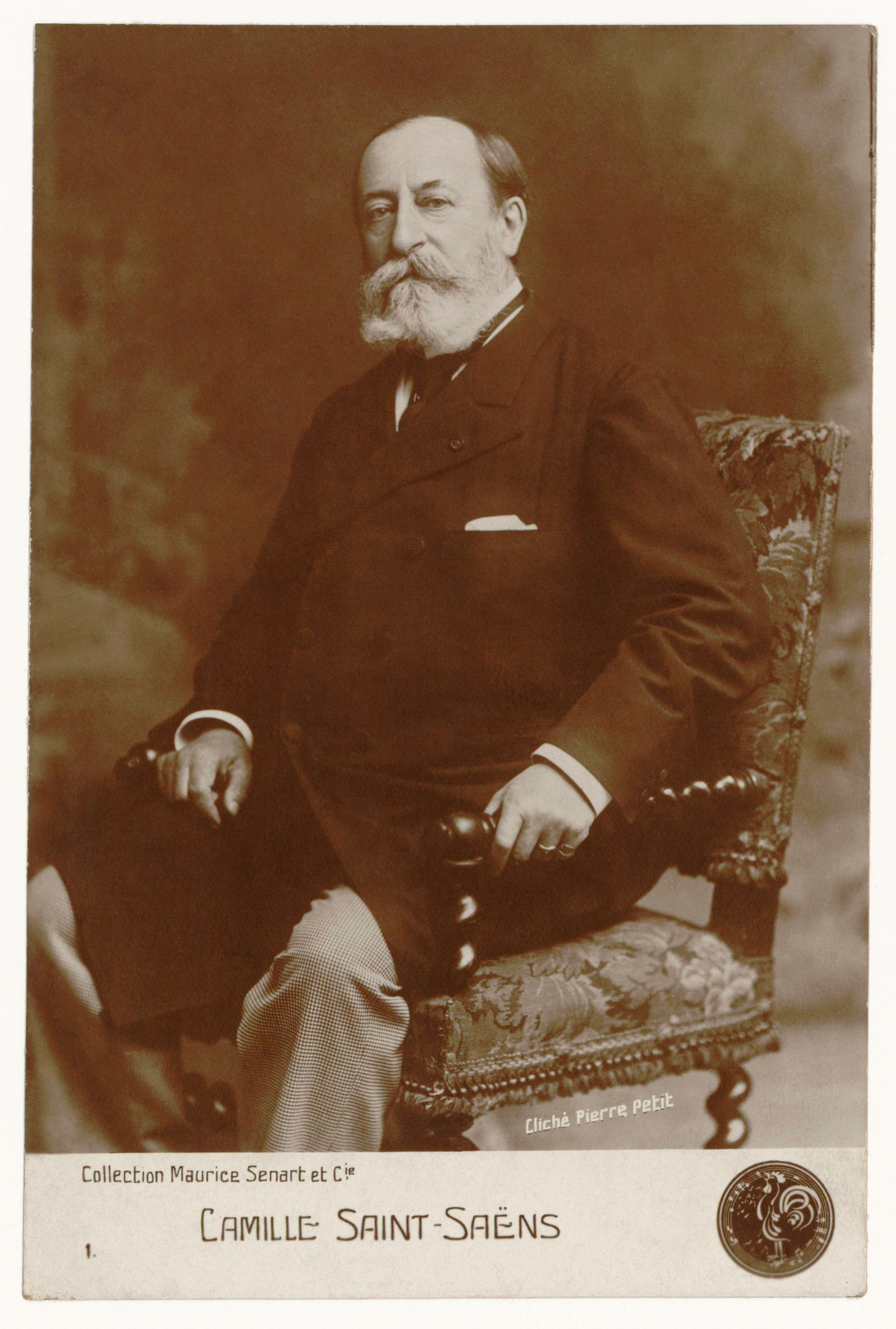
- The composer in 1900, photographed by Pierre Petit
- Librettist: Victorien Sardou; Pierre-Barthélemy Gheusi
- Language: French
- Premiere: October 1901; Palais Garnier, Paris

Les barbares is a 1901 tragédie lyrique in 3 acts by Camille Saint-Saëns to a libretto by Victorien Sardou and Pierre-Barthélemy Gheusi. The opera was originally intended for the Roman theatre of Orange, in Provence, but instead premiered at the Paris Opéra Palais Garnier in October 1901.

== Roles ==
- Floria - chief vestal virgin (soprano)
- Marcomir - leader of the Barbarians (tenor)
- Le Récitant (bass)
- Scaurus (bass)
- Le Veilleur (tenor)
- Hildibrath (baritone)
- Livie (contralto)
- Germains, légionnaires, romains, habitants d'Orange, vestales, femmes, enfants gallo-romains.

== Recordings ==
- Les Barbares : Catherine Hunold (Floria), Julia Gertseva (Livie), Edgaras Montvidas (Marcomir), Jean Teitgen (Le Récitant / Scaurus), Shawn Mathey (Le Veilleur), Philippe Rouillon (Hildibrath / Le Grand Sacrificateur), Tigran Guiragosyan (Premier Habitant), Laurent Pouliaude (Second Habitant), Ghezlane Hanzazi (Une Femme) Choeur Lyrique et Orchestre Symphonique Saint-Étienne Loire, conducted Laurent Campellone. Ediciones singulares. 2015
