= Le Théâtre (magazine) =

Defunct French lifestyle magazine

'Le Théatre'
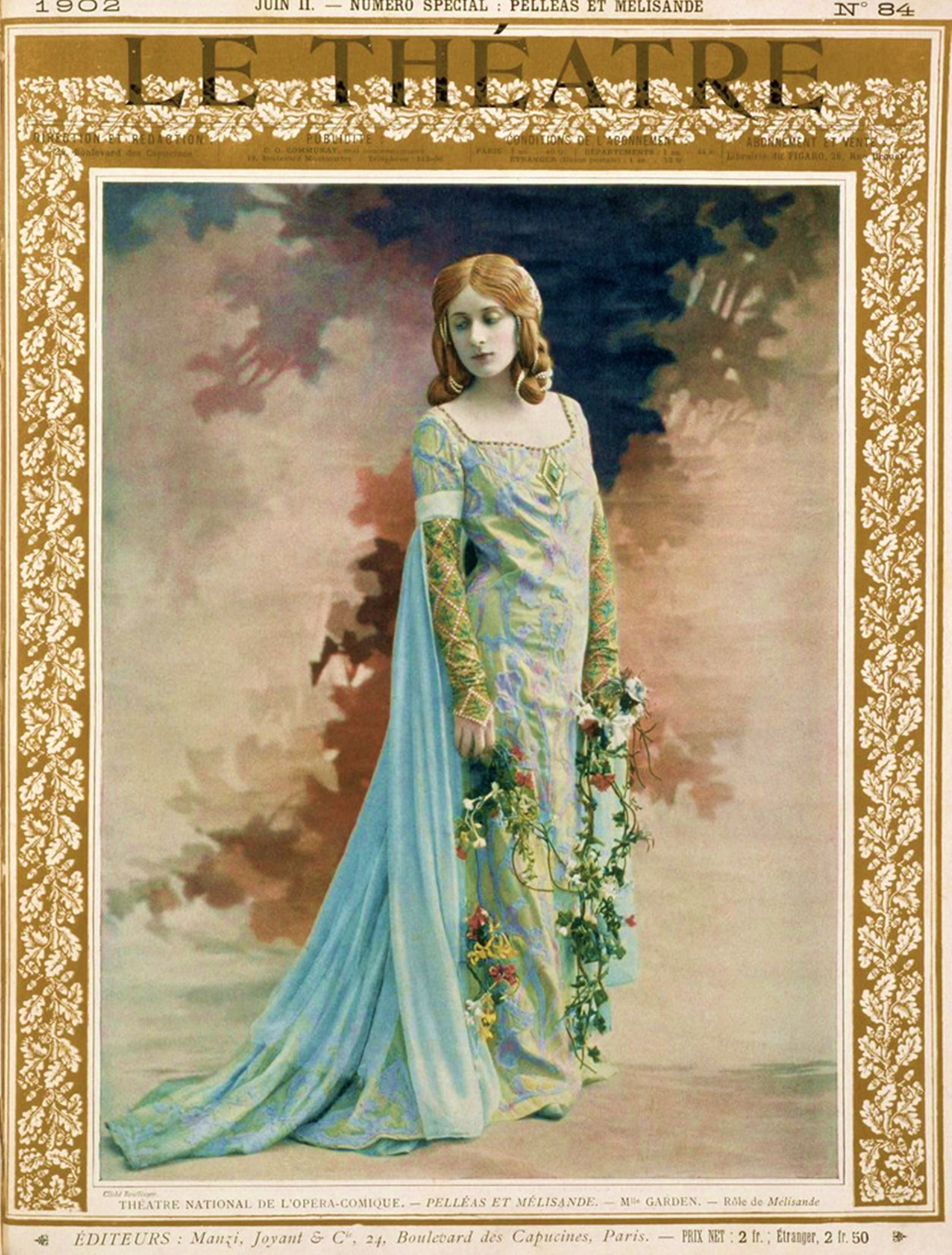
- The singer Mary Garden on the cover of the magazine Le Théâtre, n°84, June 1902.
- Categories: Cultural
- Frequency: Biweekly
- Publisher: Goupil & Cie
- Founder: Michel Manzi
- First issue: 1898
- Country: France
- Based in: Paris
- Language: French

Le Théâtre was a French cultural magazine created in 1898 as a monthly, then fortnightly until July 1914.

== History ==
Le Théâtre was a periodical launched by Goupil & Cie, which also published Les Arts and La Mode. Its issues were bound in semi-annual books of 27 centimeters (11 in) by 35 centimeters (14 in), a presentation similar to that of the famous newspaper of the time, L'Illustration. Like L'Illustration, Le Théâtre was abundantly illustrated with high quality black and white photos. In 1900, the magazine often featured full-page color photographs, especially on the front cover. Le Théatre's editorial office was located on 24 Boulevard des Capucines in the 9th arrondissement of Paris. Its founder and director was the Franco-Napolitan photoengraver Michel Manzi (1849–1915), who was also the director of the Ateliers d'Asnières where the newspaper was printed by the successors and buyers of the Goupil house.
