= Jean Dara =

Jean Dara (1862–1944). was the stage name of the actor Edouard de La Gandara, brother of painter Antonio de La Gandara.

Jean Dara was born in Paris. He worked with Sarah Bernhardt for several years in Paris, London, and the United States of America. Some of the characters he played were: - Georges in Spiritisme by Victorien Sardou - Comte de Sedlinsky in L'Aiglon by Edmond Rostand - Trevilhac in La Tosca by Victorien Sardou - Cardinal Cibo Malaspina in Lorenzaccio by Alfred de Musset - Fray Théofilo Harra in La Sorcière by Victorien Sardou.

When his brother died, Edouard de La Gandara ended his theatre career to focus on his antiques business located at the fashionable Quai Voltaire in Paris. He remained close to a number of writers, actors and actresses until his death. They include Colette, Paul Fort, Abel Hermant, Robert de Montesquiou, Georges Lecomte, René Fauchois, Cécile Sorel, Mary Marquet, Jacques Deval, Anna de Noailles, Édouard Henriot, Maurice Donnay, Marie Samary, Marie Leconte, Simone, Albert Flament, and J.-H. Rosny.

Dara is buried at Père Lachaise Cemetery in Paris.
