= Samuel David =

French composer (1836–1895)

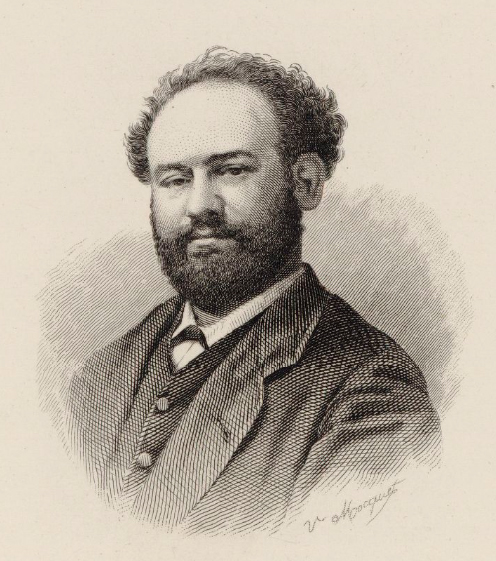
Samuel David

Samuel David (12 November 1836 – 3 October 1895) was a French composer.

== Life ==
Born in Paris, David studied harmony with François Bazin and musical composition with Jacques Fromental Halévy at the Conservatoire de Paris. At the age of thirteen he received a first prize in solfège. in 1858 he won the Premier Grand Prix de Rome with the cantata Jephté after Émile Cécile.

From 1856 David was choirmaster at the Théâtre-Lyrique. That same year, his operetta Peau de l'ours was also performed at Les Folies-Nouvelles. At an international choir festival in Paris, in which 6000 singers took part, his composition Le Génie de la terre was performed in 1859 and awarded a gold medal.

After his stay at the Villa Medici in Rome (1859–60), which was associated with the Prix de Rome, David became music professor at the Collège Sainte-Barbe. From 1872 he was responsible as directeur de la musique des temples consistoriaux for the liturgical music in the large Grand Synagogue of Paris in the Rue de la Victoire. After his death Jules Franck succeeded him in this position.

In addition to choral works, David composed four symphonies as well as numerous operettas and operas, of which only Mademoiselle Sylvia (after Narcisse Fournier) was performed at the Opéra-Comique in 1868 during his lifetime. In 1862 his music pedagogical writing L’Art de jouer en mesure was published.

David died in Paris in 1895.

== Operas and operettas ==
- Les Chevaliers du poignard, comic opera in two acts, 1864
- Mademoiselle Sylvia, 1868
- Tu l'as voulu, 1869
- Le bien d'autrui, 1869
- Un caprice de Ninon, 1871
- Caprice de Ninon, 1874
- La Fée des bruyères, comic opera in three acts, 1878
- La Gageure, comic opera in three acts
- Maccabei, Italian opera in four acts
- Une Dragonnade, comic opera in one act
- L'Education d'un prince, comic opera in one act
- Absalon, comic opera in one act
- Les Changeurs, comic opera in one act
