= Émile Paladilhe =

French composer (1844–1926)

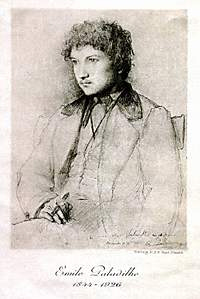
Émile Paladilhe

Émile Paladilhe (3 June 1844 – 6 January 1926) was a French composer of the late romantic period. He is best known for his opera Patrie!, which premiered successfully at the Paris Opera.

== Biography ==
Émile Paladilhe was born in Montpellier. He was a musical child prodigy, and moved from his home in the south of France to Paris to begin his studies at the Conservatoire de Paris at age 10. He became an accomplished pianist, and was the youngest winner of the Prix de Rome, three years after Bizet, in 1860. For a time Galli-Marié was his lover, and she helped create some of his works. Paladilhe married the daughter of the librettist Ernest Legouvé. He formed a friendship with the elderly Charles Gounod.

== Works ==
He wrote a number of compositions for the stage, a symphony, over a hundred mélodies, piano works, and a wide range of sacred music, including cantatas, motets, masses, chorales, and a noted oratorio, Les Saintes-Marie de la mer.

His opera Patrie! of 1886 was his greatest success, and was one of the last grand operas to premiere at the Paris Opéra. It was a piece d'occasion, created for a gala in honour of the French colony in Monaco, but had a Flemish-nationalist theme. The librettists were Victorien Sardou and Louis Gallet

A few of Paladilhe's works for solo woodwind and solo voice are still performed today, the most notable being his Solo pour hautbois, alternatively titled Solo de concert, written in 1898.

== Operas ==
- La fiancée d'Abydos, 1864–66, fragments
- Le passant, opéra-comique in one act, (F. Coppée), first performed (f.p.) Opéra-Comique, 24 April 1872
- L'amour africain, opéra-comique in two act, (E. Le Gouvé), f.p. Opéra-Comique, 8 May 1875
- Suzanne, opéra-comique in 3 acts, (de Lockroy & Cormon), f.p. Opéra-Comique, 30 December 1878
- Diana, opéra-comique in 3 acts, (Regnier & Normand), f.p. Opéra-Comique, 23 February 1885
- Patrie!, grand opera in 5 acts, (Sardou & Gallet), f.p. Opéra de Paris (Palais Garnier), 16 December 1886
- Vanina, opéra in 4 acts, (Legouvé & Gallet), composed 1890 (unperformed)
- Dalila, opéra in 3 acts, (Feuillet et Gallet), composed 1896 (unperformed)
