= Agustarello Affre =

French operatic tenor

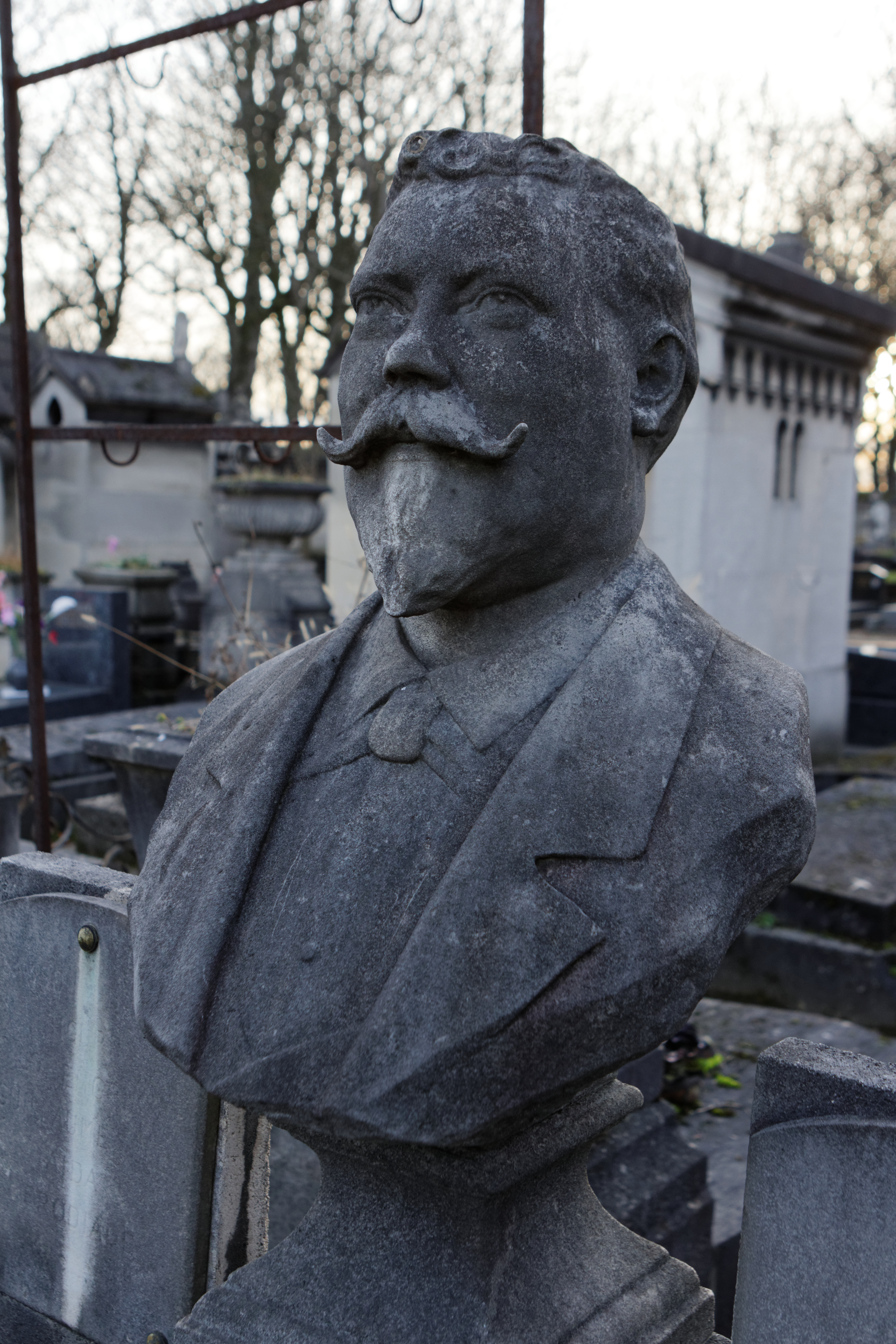
Tomb of Affre

Agustarello Affre (23 October 1858 - 27 December 1931) was a French operatic tenor. He possessed a powerful, firm and exceptionally beautiful voice which garnered him the nickname the "French Tamagno" in comparison to the great Italian tenor. He was one of the leading operatic tenors in Paris from 1890 to 1911. He spent the last years of his career singing and directing operas in the United States. After World War I, he lived in retirement in France.

== Life and career ==
Born Auguste Affre in Saint-Chinian, Affre was trained at the Conservatoire de Toulouse and the Conservatoire de Paris. He studied singing with Edmond Duvernoy and Pierre Gailhard. After singing in theatres in the French provinces, he made his debut in Paris at the Opéra in 1890 as Edgardo in Gaetano Donizetti's Lucia di Lammermoor opposite Nellie Melba in the title role, who also made her debut. He remained a leading tenor at that opera house for the next 20 years, portraying such roles as Arnold Melchtal in William Tell, Belmonte in Die Entführung aus dem Serail, the Duke of Mantua in Rigoletto, Eléazar in La Juive, Fernand in La favorite, Jean de Leyde in Le prophète, Radames in Aida, Raoul de Nangis in Les Huguenots, Renaud in Gluck's Armide, Vasco da Gama in L'Africaine, and the title roles in Lohengrin and Sigurd. He created the role of the Touranien prisoner in the world premiere of Jules Massenet's Le mage in 1891.

Outside of Paris, Affre appeared as a guest artist at the Opéra de Marseille, Opéra National de Lyon, and the Théâtre du Grand Cercle in Aix-les-Bains. In 1900 he performed at La Monnaie in Brussels. In 1909 he appeared at the Royal Opera House in London as Samson in Samson et Dalila and in the title role of Gounod's Faust. He recorded extensively for Pathé, including the roles of Don José in Georges Bizet's Carmen (1911) and Roméo in Gounod's Roméo et Juliette (1912) in the company's "Le Théâtre chez soi" ("Your Theater at Home") full-length opera and drama series. In 1911 he moved to the United States where he was heard in operas in New Orleans, San Francisco, and in Havana. He became director of the French Opera House in New Orleans in 1913 when it came under the ownership of Tulane University, remaining there until 1915. He died in Cagnes-sur-Mer in 1931 at the age of 73. He is buried at the Père Lachaise Cemetery in Paris.

In contemporary sources, including those written by the tenor himself, his stage name is spelled "Gustarello". The spelling "Agustarello" appears only posthumously, and is presumably an error. In contemporary reviews, on record labels and in the tenor's own spoken introductions to many of his sound recordings, he is simply "Monsieur Affre".
