= Abigaille Bruschi-Chiatti =

19th-century Italian opera singer

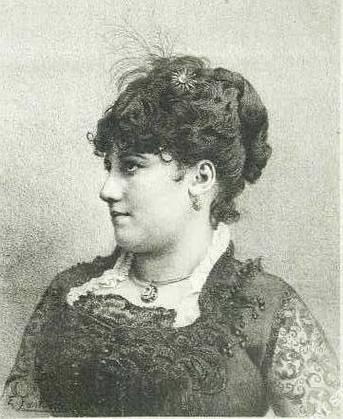
- Portrait from Il Teatro Illustrato, 1887
- Born: c. 1855; Arezzo, Italy
- Died: after 1888
- Occupation: Opera singer (soprano)
- Years active: 1877–1888

Abigaille Bruschi-Chiatti (c. 1855 – after 1888) was an Italian soprano who sang in the principal opera houses of Italy as well as in Latin America and at the Teatro Real in Spain. Amongst the roles she created were Amelia di Egmont in the 1882 posthumous premiere of Donizetti's Il duca d'Alba and Élisabeth de Valois in the 1884 revised version of Verdi's Don Carlos.

== Life and career ==
Bruschi-Chiatti was born in Arezzo and initially studied singing there with Giovanni Guidieri. In 1871 she was accepted at the Regio Istituto Musicale di Firenze (now known as the Conservatorio Luigi Cherubini) where she studied under Giuseppe Ceccherini. One of her earliest appearances in a major role was as Aida at the Teatro Vittorio Emanuele in Messina in 1877. By 1879, she was singing at the Teatro Regio di Torino where she created the role of Ero in Giovanni Bottesini's Ero e Leandro and sang the role of Sulamith in the theatre's first performance of Goldmark's Die Königin von Saba. The critic reviewing the premiere of Ero e Leandro for Nuova Antologia praised the young singer for the beauty of her voice and its evenness throughout the registers as well as her elocution and phrasing.

Later in 1879 she sang in Buenos Aires at the Teatro Colón and in Rio de Janeiro at the Theatro Dom Pedro II with Angelo Ferrari's Italian opera company whose singers included Francesco Tamagno. On her return to Italy she sang Rachel in Halévy's La Juive at the Teatro Apollo in Rome during the 1881/82 season and at La Scala in the 1882/83 season. In 1882, she created the role of Amelia di Egmont in the posthumous premiere of Donizetti's Il duca d'Alba at the Teatro Apollo. In his review of the premiere, the critic for La Gazzetta Musicale di Milano wrote: "Signora Bruschi-Chiatti with her beauty and a voice that was brilliant, fresh, robust and a true soprano ... sang with warmth and passion."

On 10 January 1884, Bruschi-Chiatti appeared at La Scala as Élisabeth de Valois in the premiere of Verdi's revised version of Don Carlos with Francesco Tamagno in the title role. Contemporary accounts noted that she had very evident stage fright on the opening night (a problem she also had at the premiere of Il duca d'Alba) which negatively impacted her performance in the first three acts. However, she had overcome it by the final act and received great applause and requests for an encore after her performance of the aria "Tu che le vanità". She appeared again at La Scala later that season in the title role of Verdi's Aida. During the course of her career her other Verdian roles included Amelia in Un ballo in maschera, Leonora in La forza del destino, and Leonora in Il trovatore.

In the later years of her career, Bruschi-Chiatti also appeared at the Teatro Real in Madrid, notably in an acclaimed performance La Juive in 1887. She was scheduled to sing Aida at the Teatro Argentina in Rome during the autumn of 1888, but withdrew from the production after becoming ill during the rehearsals.
