= Le duc d'Albe =

1882 opera by Gaetano Donizetti

Le duc d'Albe Il duca d'Alba
- Opera by Gaetano Donizetti
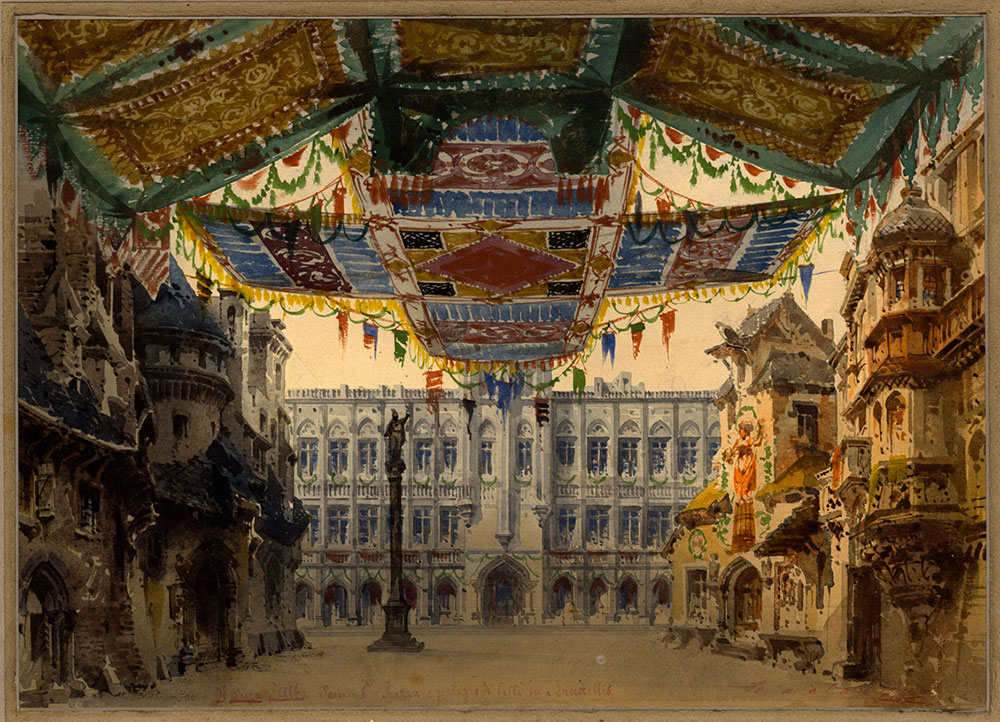
- Set design for the 1882 premiere, by Carlo Ferrario
- Librettist: Eugène Scribe; Charles Duveyrier
- Premiere: 22 March 1882; Teatro Apollo, Rome

Le duc d'Albe (its original French title) or Il duca d'Alba (its later Italian title) is an opera in three acts originally composed by Gaetano Donizetti in 1839 to a French language libretto by Eugène Scribe and Charles Duveyrier. Its title, which translates as The Duke of Alba, refers to its protagonist Fernando Álvarez de Toledo, 3rd Duke of Alba. The work was intended for performance at the Paris Opéra. However, William Ashbrook notes that "Rosine Stoltz, the director's mistress, disliked her intended role of Hélène and Donizetti put the work aside when it was half completed".

Donizetti then abandoned the score in favour of continuing to work simultaneously on both L'ange de Nisida (later became La favorite), and thus it was nearly 34 years after the composer's death that it was completed by his former pupil Matteo Salvi and received its first performance in an Italian translation and under its Italian title Il duca d'Alba at the Teatro Apollo in Rome on 22 March 1882 with Leone Giraldoni in the title role, Abigaille Bruschi Chiatti as Amelia di Egmont, and Julián Gayarre as Marcello.

It received almost no performances in Italian until the mid-20th century and was only given its first performances in French in May 2012.

== Composition history ==
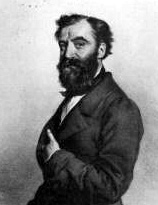
Matteo Salvi who completed Donizetti's score for the opera's 1882 posthumous premiere

The opera had been originally commissioned for the Paris Opéra in 1839, and Donizetti worked on it throughout most of that year. However, he abandoned the project with only the first two acts completed, plus notes for the melodies and bass lines for acts 3 and 4. The opera remained unfinished at the time of his death in 1848.

Although abandoned for the Opéra and still incomplete, Donizetti felt that his contract for this opera had been broken and, in late May 1845, decided to leave Vienna for Paris where he would claim a forfeit from the Opéra for its non-production, which was still unfinished, as was the libretto. He left Vienna for the last time on 10 July 1845, but appears to have done nothing about the claim when he arrived in Paris, and his final illness soon claimed him.

In 1855, Scribe and Duveyrier's libretto was transferred to Verdi's opera Les vêpres siciliennes, with the setting changed from the Spanish occupation of Flanders in 1573 to the French occupation of Sicily in 1282.

In 1881 Matteo Salvi, a former pupil of Donizetti's, completed the opera from Donizetti's notes with the help of Amilcare Ponchielli, Antonio Bazzini and Cesare Domeniceti. Angelo Zanardini translated Scribe's libretto from the original French into Italian. The names of the two lovers 'Henri' and 'Hélène' (which by that time had been used in Les vêpres siciliennes) were changed to 'Marcello' and 'Amelia'.

When Donizetti abandoned the opera, he re-cycled the famous tenor aria, 'Ange si pur' ( 'Spirto gentil' in the Italian version) for his 1840 opera La favorite. For the premiere, Salvi composed a replacement aria, 'Angelo casto e bel'. He also added recitatives and combined acts 3 and 4 into a single final act.

== Performance history ==
Original French version

In May 2012 Vlaamse Opera in Antwerp and Ghent presented the first performances of the original French opera in a four-act version, which had been completed in 2012 with additional music by Giorgio Battistelli. It used the critical edition prepared by musicologist Roger Parker who has written extensive notes on the evolution of this original version. The French version featured George Petean as the Duke and Rachel Harnisch as Hélène d'Egmont. and it was conducted by Paolo Carignani.

Julián Gayarre who created the role of Marcello in 1882

Italian version

The opera has only been rarely performed since 1882 and "no one seems even to have remembered its existence, until, that is, Fernando Previtali discovered the battered full-score used by the conductor at that momentous prima on a market stall in Rome [on 12 January 1952]". Prof. Alexander Weatherson of London's Donizetti Society, in his study of the opera's performance history notes that:

Performance history insists that it was under the baton of Fernando Previtali that the treasured score of Il duca d'Alba was brought back to life, complete, in a concert performance in that same city of Rome where it had been discovered on that famous market stall. But this is far from correct. That rebirth version was already abridged, the opera was given in three acts, not four.

However, there was a major revival of the Italian version at the 1959 Festival dei Due Mondi in Spoleto, after conductor Thomas Schippers rediscovered the score (originally found in 1952), reworked it by removing most of Salvi's additions and reconstructing the final acts himself from Donizetti's notes. All the same, Weatherson has also stated:

At the Teatro Nuovo of Spoleto on 11 June 1959 was staged a further purported revival of the Donizetti/Salvi opera, again in three acts, the orchestra reduced throughout to "Donizettian" sound-bites (as though the Paris Opéra of his day would have been deficient in instrumentation), with preludes and recitatives dropped....and pared-down codas. Spirto gentil once again making an inappropriate appearance in place of Angelo casto e bel. This 1959 cut-price version outlined the merest skeleton of the composer's musical plan, Mr Schippers, it would seem, had no taste for grand opera and tried to rewrite Donizetti's score as if it was a melodramma romantico such as he might have composed some ten years before his Paris adventure."

The Spoleto production was directed by Luchino Visconti, who used restored sets from the 1882 premiere.

Schippers presented the United States premiere of the work later that year under the umbrella of the American Opera Society at the Academy of Music in Philadelphia on 15 October 1959.

Other stagings included that at the Théâtre Royal de la Monnaie in Brussels in 1979 (using sets inspired by Carlo Ferrario's 1882 designs), the run of six performances at the Teatro San Carlo, Naples, in December 1979 and January 1980, and, in October 1982, Opera Orchestra of New York conducted by Eve Queler gave a concert performance of a version of the opera with Matteo Manuguerra in the title role. About this performance, Weatherson notes: "where there were cuts galore but also the restitution of many of the more characterful sections of the Salvi score".

When the Schippers version with the Visconti production was revived at the Teatro Nuovo in Spoleto (Festival dei Due Mondi) on 1 July 1992 "...there was a further attempt...this time under the baton of Alberto Maria Giuri [and] when the Donizetti/Salvi Il duca d'Alba finally made an appearance in an edition at last musically worthy of its original dimensions and dramatic character, far more complete now, the Duca d'Alba sung by Alan Titus, Marcello by César Hernàndez, Amelia by Michaela Sburiati, Sandoval by Marco Pauluzzo and Carlo by Dennis Petersen."

On 16 July 2007, a concert performance was given by the Orchestre national de Montpellier Languedoc-Roussillon. "It was conducted by Enrique Mazzola; with Inva Mula (Amelia), Franck Ferrari (Duca), Arturo Chacón-Cruz (Marcello), Francesco Ellero d'Artegna (Sandoval) and Mauro Corna (Daniele) with the Orchestre National de Montpellier. The performance has been subsequently issued on CD."

== Roles ==
Roles, voice types, premiere cast
Role Italian / French	Voice type	Italian version Premiere cast, 22 March 1882 Conductor: Marino Mancinelli
Il duca d'Alba / Le Duc d'Albe, Governor of Flanders for King Philip II of Spain	baritone	Leone Giraldoni
Amelia di Egmont / Hélène d'Egmont	soprano	Abigaille Bruschi-Chiatti
Marcello di Bruges / Henri de Bruges, a Flemish patriot and Amelia's lover	tenor	Julián Gayarre
Sandoval, Captain of the Spanish troops	baritone	Hjalmar Frey
Carlo / Carlos, a Spanish officer	tenor	Giovanni Paroli
Daniele Brauer / Daniel Brauer, a Flemish patriot	baritone	Alessandro Silvestri
Il taverniere / Un Tavernier, a beer seller	bass	Romeo Sartori

== Synopsis ==
Place: Brussels and Antwerp
Time: 1573

=== Act 1 ===
The Duke of Alba has been sent to Flanders to suppress the rebellion against Spanish rule. Shortly before the action begins, Amelia's father Egmont, a Flemish hero, had been executed by the Duke and she is now determined to assassinate him. The Duke discovers that his long-lost son Marcello, Amelia's lover, is now the leader of the rebellion. The Duke arrests him when he refuses to join the Spanish army.

=== Act 2 ===
When Marcello is freed from prison, he appeals to the Duke to spare his co-conspirators and Amelia, all of whom have been arrested in Daniele Bauer's tavern. The Duke reveals to Marcello that he is his father. In exchange for his friends' freedom, Marcello kneels before the Duke and acknowledges him as his father.

=== Act 3 ===
Marcello confesses to Amelia that he is the Duke's son. She asks him to kill the Duke as proof of his love for her. Torn between his father and the woman he loves, Marcello hesitates. Later at the port of Antwerp, Amelia, disguised as a man, takes matters into her own hands and attempts to stab the Duke to death. Marcello throws himself on the Duke to shield him and is unwittingly killed by Amelia.

== Recordings ==
Italian version: Prepared by Angelo Zanardini, Rome 1882.

Year	Cast (Il duca d'Alba, Marcello di Bruges, Amelia di Egmont)	Conductor, Opera house and orchestra	Label
1951	Giangiacomo Guelfi, Amedeo Berdini, Caterina Mancini	Fernando Previtali, Orchestra sinfonica della RAI di Roma	CD: Bongiovanni Historical Opera Collection; Cat: HOC015-16
1959	Louis Quilico, Renato Cioni, Ivana Tosini	Thomas Schippers, Trieste Philharmonic Orchestra and Teatro Lirico Giuseppe Verdi Chorus	CD: Opera D'Oro; Cat: OPD1178
1982	Matteo Manuguerra, Dalmacio González, Marina Krilovici	Eve Queler, Opera Orchestra of New York and Schola Cantorum of New York (Recording of a concert performance in Carnegie Hall, New York, 28 October)	CD: Omega Opera Archive; Cat: 2574
2007	Franck Ferrari, Arturo Chacón Cruz, Inva Mula	Enrique Mazzola, Orchestre national de Montpellier Languedoc-Roussillon and Latvian Radio Chorus. (Recording of a concert performance)	CD: Accord; Cat: 4800845

Original version using the French text: Completed by Giorgio Battistelli in 2012.

Year	Cast (Le Duc d'Albe, Henri de Bruges, Hélène d'Egmont)	Conductor, Opera house and orchestra	Label
2012	George Petean, Ismael Jordi, Rachel Harnisch	Paolo Carignani, Symphony Orchestra and Chorus of the Vlaamse Opera Antwerp/Ghent (Recorded at a performance given by the Vlaamse Opera in May 2012)	CD: Dynamic, Cat: CDS 7665
2016	Laurent Naouri, Michael Spyres, Angela Meade	Mark Elder, Hallé Orchestra, Opera Rara Chorus	CD:Opera Rara; Cat:ORC54
