= Matteo Salvi =

Italian composer

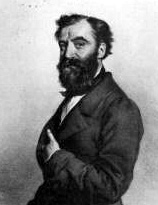
Portrait of Matteo Salvi

Matteo Salvi (24 November 1816 – 18 October 1887) was a composer of opera and classical music and a theatre director.

Salvi was born in Botta di Sedrina (Provincia di Bergamo), Italy. A student of Gaetano Donizetti, he is best known for having completed the score of Donizetti's unfinished opera Le duc d’Albe for its first public performance in 1882, some forty years after Donizetti's death. (The libretto was translated into Italian, and the opera was performed as Il duca d’Alba.) Salvi is usually credited as the composer of the tenor aria “Angelo casto e bel” in Il duca d’Alba, although as he was helped in the reconstruction of Donizetti's score by several composers, including Amilcare Ponchielli, there has been some dispute as to the degree to which he was the aria's sole composer. He died in Rieti, Italy.

== Principal compositions ==
- La prima donna 1843—opera to a libretto by Carlo Guaita
- Lara 1843—opera to a libretto by Leopoldo Tarentini and dedicated to Johann Simon Mayr
- I Burgravi 1845—opera to a libretto by Giacomo Sacchèro
- Caterina Howard 1847—opera to a libretto by Giorgio Giachetti
- Messa: a voci sole con accompagnamento d’organo
- Cantata per soli e coro con orchestra: la gloria e la musica apoteosi di Mayr

== Notes and references ==
- Altmann, W. and Frank, P., 1936, Kurzgefasstes Tonkunstler Lexikon: fur Musiker und Freunde der Musik, Regensburg: Gustave Bosse.
- Archivi Teatro Napoli (accessed 25 April 2007)
- Ashbrook, W., “Donizetti Portraits,” Opera Quarterly, 1998; 14: 205–208.
- Buldrini, Y., 2005, Dossier: Il Duca d’Alba, Forum Opéra (accessed 25 April 2007)
- Donati-Petteni, G., 1930, L’arte della musica in Bergamo, Bergamo: Instituto Italiano d’Arti Graphiche di Bergamo.
- Forcella, P., 1987. Matteo Salvi : musicista bergamasco sul palcoscenico d’Europa, Bergamo: Edizioni Villadiseriane.
- OPAC, Provincia di Bergamo (accessed 25 April 2007)
- Stieger, F., 1977, Opernlexikon, Teil II: Komponisten, Tutzing: Hans Schneider.
