= Ermanno Picchi =

Italian composer and music critic

- Born: 7 June 1811; Impruneta, Italy
- Died: 18 April 1856 (aged 44); Florence, Italy
- Occupations: composer; pedagogue; music critic

Ermanno Picchi (7 June 1811 – 18 April 1856) was an Italian composer, pedagogue and music critic who played an active role in the musical life of Florence from 1836 until his early death in 1856.

== Life and career ==
Picchi was born in Impruneta in the Province of Florence and studied composition under Ignazio Colson. His first opera, Marco Visconti premiered at the Teatro del Cocomero in Florence in 1838. His second opera Il tre novembre premiered in 1844 at the Teatro della Pergola. Over the course of his career he composed four operas, an oratorio, numerous pieces of sacred music, music for military bands, and two piano fantasias (both published by Ricordi) on themes from Donizetti's La fille du régiment and Pacini's Saffo. He also composed Concerto for alto sax and band, on the occasion of the presentation of the sax in Italy.

He was appointed secretary of the Florence Conservatory (at the time an annex of the Accademia di Belle Arti di Firenze) in 1850 and in 1852 succeeded Giovanni Pacini as its director. Picchi became the founding editor of the weekly journal Gazzetta musicale di Firenze in 1853, providing critical guidance in its first two years of publication. Each issue came in two parts. The first had essays on music theory and criticism, while the second focused on reviews of noteworthy performances in Italy and the rest of Europe as well as literary and biographical articles. He also translated the libretto of Meyerbeer's L'étoile du nord for its Italian premiere in 1856 as La stella del nord.

Picchi died in Florence at the age of 44 from what was described at the time as "miliary fever". His daughter Elisa married the Florentine composer Giuseppe Ceccherini.

== Operas and oratorios ==
- Ezechia (Ezekiel), oratorio in two parts, libretto by Luigi Venturi; premiered Chiesa di San Giovanni Evangelista, Florence, 1836
- Marco Visconti, melodramma in three acts, libretto by Luigi Venturi; premiered Teatro del Cocomero, Florence, 1838
- Il tre novembre, o La sgomberatura, melodramma giocoso in two acts, libretto by Felice Romani; premiered Teatro della Pergola, Florence, 1844
- Concerto, premiered Accademia Filarmonica, Florence, 1848 (https://www.ilsaxofonoitaliano.it/opere/concerto-11/)
- Don Crescendo, melodramma giocoso in three acts (co-composed with Ettore Fiori), libretto by Gaspari Pozzesi; premiered Teatro di Piazza Vecchia, Florence, 1851
- Il domino bianco, melodramma giocoso four acts, libretto by Giovanni Battista Canovai; premiered Teatro della Pergola, Florence, 1856
