= Giuseppe Ceccherini =

Italian composer

- Born: 24 November 1829; Florence, Grand Duchy of Tuscany
- Died: 2 November 1899 (aged 69); Florence, Italy
- Occupations: Composer, singing teacher

Giuseppe Ceccherini (24 November 1829 – 2 November 1899) was an Italian composer and singing teacher. (Note: He is not to be confused with the Florentine librettist Giuseppe Checcherini (1777-1840) whose surname is sometimes spelled as "Ceccherini".) He was born in Florence, the son of Ferdinando Ceccherini (1792–1858), a noted tenor, composer, and the maestro di cappella of Florence's principal cathedral, Santa Maria del Fiore.

Like his father, Ceccherini served as the maestro di cappella of Santa Maria del Fiore for which he composed numerous pieces of sacred music. His compositions, long forgotten, were found in the cathedral's archives, transcribed by the musicologist Gabriele Giacomelli and performed in a concert at the Cathedral in June 2004. Their style reflect his passion for Italian opera and sometimes had musical quotations from operatic scores such as his Verbum caro which contains melodies from Bellini's opera Norma.

For many years, Ceccherini was the professor of singing at the Regio Istituto Musicale di Firenze (now known as the Conservatorio Luigi Cherubini) where his pupils included the sopranos Luisa Tetrazzini, Ida Isori, Zaira Zelli and Abigaille Bruschi-Chiatti. He also taught music and singing at the Istituto della Santissima Annunziata and the Conservatorio delle Mantellate in Florence. Ceccherini died in Florence at the age of 69 after a long illness and was buried in the Cimitero di Soffiano. His wife Elisa was the daughter of the Florentine composer Ermanno Picchi.
