= Ella giammai m'amò =

"Ella giammai m'amò" is an aria for bass from Verdi's opera Don Carlos (1867). It is one of the most famous Italian arias for bass, and is often performed in recitals and featured in anthologies for bass singers.

== Sentiment ==
The aria begins with a long orchestral prelude, which features a striking solo passage for cello. King Philip II of Spain has made a politically advantageous arranged marriage with a French princess young enough to be his granddaughter. He suspects that his son is having an affair with her. Unable to sleep, he sits alone in his study, recalls her sad look when she first met him and saw how old he was, and admits to himself that she never loved him. He wishes that his royal scepter could give him the power to see people's true characters and detect deception. He muses that he will only sleep properly in his tomb, when he is dead.

== Text ==
Ella giammai m' amò!
No, quel cor chiuso è a me,
amor per me non ha!

Io la rivedo ancor
contemplar triste in volto
il mio crin bianco il dì
che qui di Francia venne.
No, amor per me non ha.
Amor per me non ha!

Ove son?
Quei doppier presso a finir!
L' aurora imbianca il mio veron!
Già spunta il dì!
Passar veggo i miei giorni lenti!
Il sonno, o Dio!
sparì dai miei occhi languenti!

Dormirò sol nel manto mio regal.
Quando la mia giornata è giunta a sera,
dormirò sol sotto la vôlta nera,
dormirò sotto la vôlta nera,
là, nell' avello dell' Escurial.

Se il serto regal a me
desse il poter di leggere nei cor,
che Dio può sol,
può sol veder!

Ah! Se il serto regal a me
desse il poter di leggere nei cor,
che Dio sol può veder!

Se dorme il prence, veglia il traditore;
il serto perde il re, il consorte l' onore!

She never loved me!
No, her heart is closed to me,
she feels no love for me!

I can still see her,
sad-faced,
gazing at my white hair
the day she came from France.
No, she has no love for me,
she does not love me!

Where am I?
Those candelabras are almost spent!
Dawn whites my balcony,
day is already breaking!
I see my days passing slowly!
Sleep, oh God,
has vanished from my drooping eyelids.

I shall sleep alone in my royal mantle
when I attain the evening of my days,
I shall sleep alone beneath the black vault,
I shall sleep beneath the black vault,
there, in my tomb in the Escorial.

If the royal crown could but give me
the power to read human hearts
which God alone can see,
alone can see!

Ah! If the royal crown could but give me
the power to read human hearts
which God alone can see,

If the Prince sleeps, the traitors watches;
the King loses his crown, the husband his honour!

Part 1 (until "occhi languenti!")

Part2 (from "Dormirò")
Nazzareno De Angelis
