= Luisa Tetrazzini =

Italian opera singer (1871–1940)

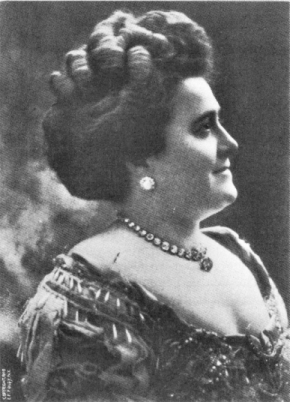
- Born: 29 June 1871; Florence, Kingdom of Italy
- Died: 28 April 1940 (aged 68); Milan, Italy
- Occupation: Operatic soprano
- Years active: 1890—1934

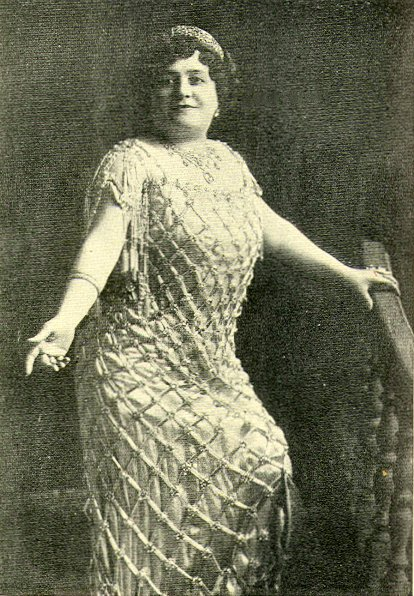
Photo from 1909 book Heart Songs

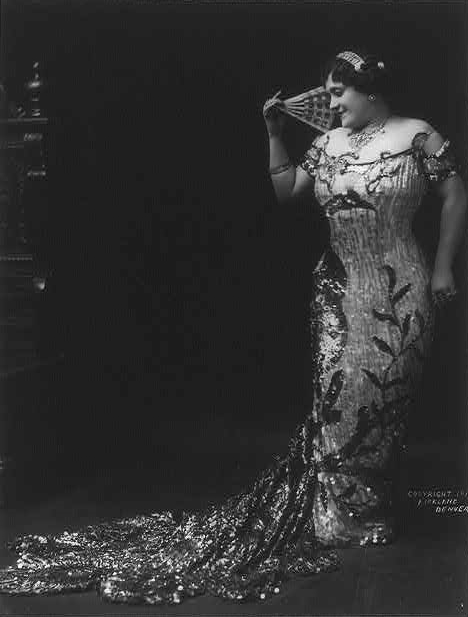
Tetrazzini in 1911

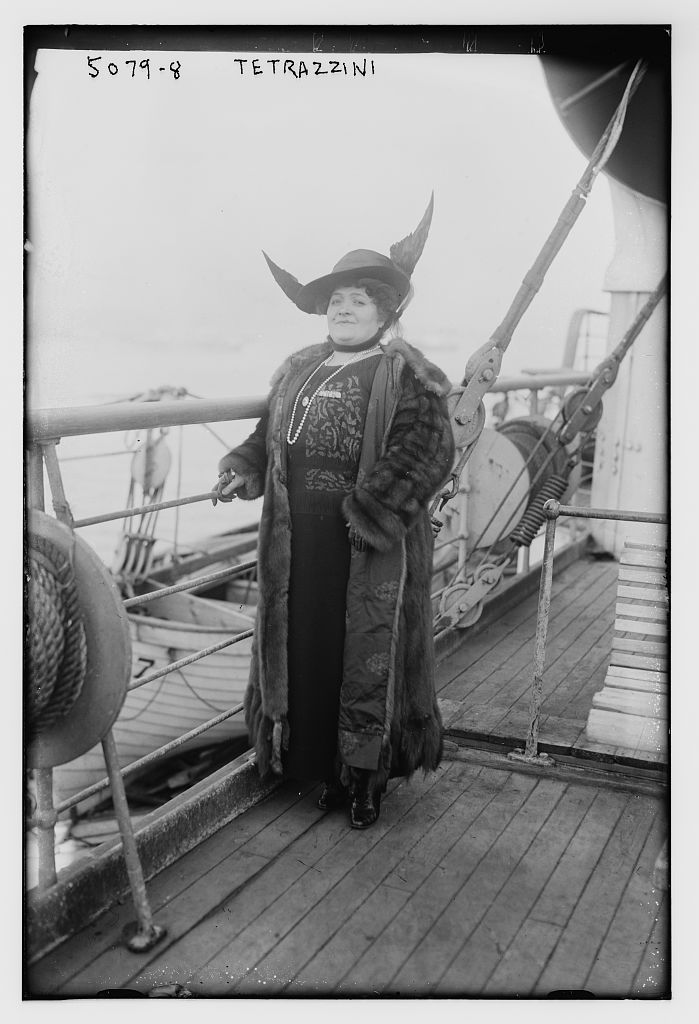
Tetrazzini arriving in New York on board the RMS Mauretania on 25 November 1919

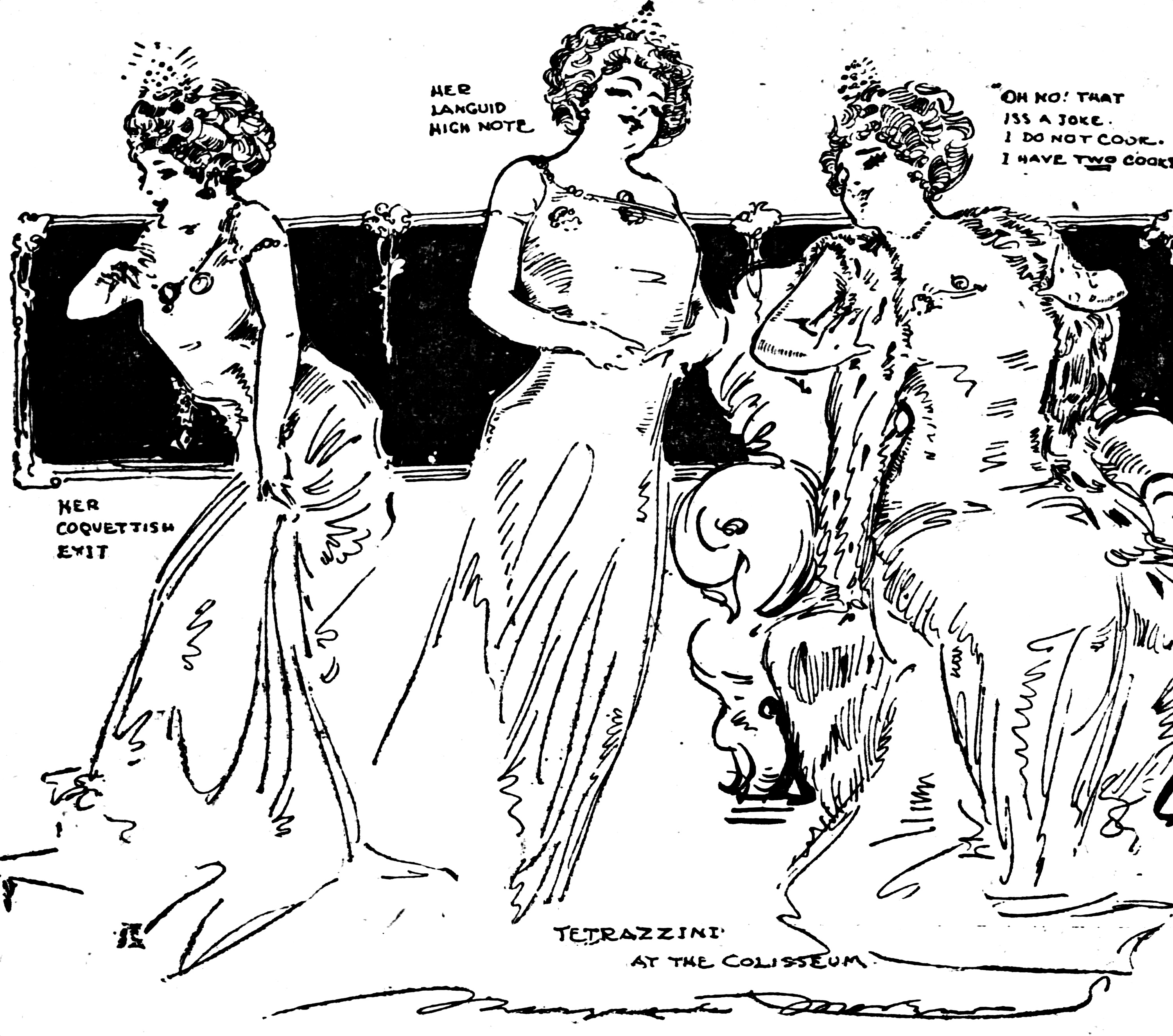
Sketches by Marguerite Martyn, 1910

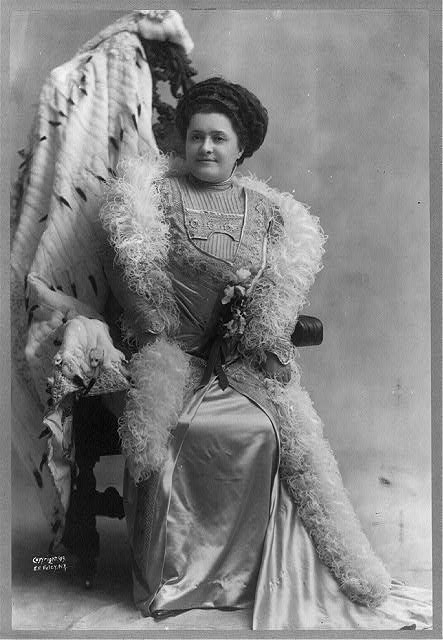
Tetrazzini in 1909

Luisa Tetrazzini (29 June 1871 – 28 April 1940) was an Italian coloratura soprano of great international fame. Tetrazzini "had a scintillating voice with a brilliant timbre and a range and agility well beyond the norm...". She enjoyed a highly successful operatic and concert career in Europe and America from the 1890s through to the 1920s. Her voice lives on in recordings made between 1904 and 1920. She wrote a memoir, My Life of Song, in 1921 and a treatise, How to Sing, in 1923. After retirement she taught voice in her homes in Milan and Rome until her death.

== Biography ==
=== Early life ===
Tetrazzini was born on 29 June 1871 in Florence, Italy. Her father was a tailor, and she had two sisters and two brothers. Reportedly she began singing at the age of three. Luisa herself recalled singing early on as a child and reminisced that her father was the first person to ever compare her to the famous bel canto soprano Adelina Patti. Luisa first studied singing with her oldest sister Eva Tetrazzini (1862–1938)(it). Eva was also a prima donna soprano who made a name for herself internationally. During her chores Luisa was known to practice entire acts of operatic roles and to sing every voice part. She began studies at the Istituto Musicale (now known as the Florence Conservatory) between the ages of ten and thirteen with Professor Giuseppe Ceccherini. She married Giuseppe Santino Alberto Scalaberni on 14 October 1889.

=== Career ===
Through a stroke of luck Tetrazzini stepped in for an ailing prima donna and made her operatic debut in Florence on 21 October 1890 as Inez in Meyerbeer's L'Africaine at age nineteen. She reminisces that after her debut, “The pavements from the theatre to my home were lined, even at that late hour, with large numbers of people, all of whom seemed to be shouting congratulations to me.” Next she sang Inez in Rome on 26 December 1890 for the King and Queen of Italy. She was then invited by the Queen to sing the Liebestod from Tristan und Isolde, as it was the Queen’s favorite opera. The first part of her career was spent mainly in the Italian provincial theaters and then touring in South America. She travelled with Pietro Cesare, who became her lover of nearly 14 years, to Buenos Aires where she was offered £280 per month to sing. Her husband Alberto followed her to Argentina with the intention of taking her back home. She refused to reconcile, and he left for Florence without her in October. Tetrazzini made her debut a few days later as Annetta in Crispino e la comare. When Alberto died on 4 June 1905, they were still separated.

Tetrazzini first sang Lucia di Lammermoor in Buenos Aires on 21 November 1892. It was her favorite opera, as well as that of Argentinian President Luis Sáenz Peña, who was an avid fan. By her fourth season in Buenos Aires, she was engaged to receive £5,500 per month. She toured South America and continued to perform there until 1895.

She returned to sing in Europe in 1896. Next she debuted in Saint Petersburg with Mattia Battistini in Un ballo in maschera on 31 December 1896. After her first season in St. Petersburg ended in 1897, she finished the year performing in Madrid, Milan, Turin, and Odessa. She then sang in Bologna in 1898 before returning to South America. The winter season of early 1899 brought Tetrazzini back to Saint Petersburg, where she first performed with Enrico Caruso, who sang Edgardo to her Lucia in Lucia di Lammermoor on 22 February. Her 1890s repertory consisted primarily of lyric-coloratura parts such as Violetta, Philine, Oscar, Gilda, and Lucia.

From 1899 to 1903 she sang in Italy, Germany, Poland, and Russia. Her Mexican debut as Lucia came on 22 October 1903. A little over a year later her performance of Lucia on 8 December 1904 was fortuitous. William H. ‘Doc’ Leahy, impresario of San Francisco's Tivoli Theater, was in Mexico visiting his friend Ettore Patrizi, who was conducting Tetrazzini at the time. After seeing a performance, Leahy invited her to come to San Francisco, and she made her American debut at the Tivoli in San Francisco as Gilda in Rigoletto on 11 January 1905.

Due to Dame Nellie Melba's absence an opening became available for Tetrazzini at the esteemed Royal Opera House in London's Covent Garden. Although she had established a career throughout South America and much of Europe, she was practically unknown to English audiences. Tetrazzini's Covent Garden debut as Violetta in La traviata on 2 November 1907 was critically acclaimed and "caused a sensation..." She made twenty curtain calls. E.A. Baugham in the Daily News wrote, "The quality of tone produced by Tetrazzini ravished the sense. It is soft and golden and yet has none of the impersonal and chilling perfection of the ordinary light soprano...I have never seen the pathos of Verdi’s heroine realized with such grip and sincerity... I do not think I am exaggerating when I say that Mme Tetrazzini has the voice of the century and stands out from even the great Italian singers we know..." Additional reviews were similarly complimentary of Tetrazzini’s abilities, even comparing her to the famous Adelina Patti, the premier soprano of an earlier generation. Tetrazzini idolized Patti greatly. She remarks that Patti saw her performance and invited her to a lunch during which she confirmed the press’s clamoring that Tetrazzini would continue her legacy. Tetrazzini and Patti became great friends and were frequent correspondents until Patti's death. Patti made it a point to attend and loudly applaud the younger soprano's performances. Tetrazzini prized as her greatest treasure a letter, in which Patti wrote about one of her performances, with Tetrazzini saying, "Praise from a mixed audience is very gratifying after one has given it of her best. But, praise, and such praise, from Patti is far more than the passing pleasure of a public ovation."

From this point on, Tetrazzini was an international operatic superstar, commanding the highest fees and selling out opera houses and concert halls wherever she performed. In 1904, the Metropolitan Opera's general manager, Heinrich Conried, had tried to engage Tetrazzini with a contract that committed her to singing with the Met for three years starting in November 1905. This contract never became binding as Conried failed to give her bank the guarantee deposit. In 1908, Tetrazzini finally appeared in New York City, not at the Metropolitan, but at Oscar Hammerstein's Manhattan Opera Company, again as Violetta with great success. She remained loyal to Hammerstein and appeared at the Met for only one season, in 1911-12 (giving just eight performances, in the roles of Lucia, Violetta, and Gilda). From 1911 to 1914 she sang with the Boston Opera Company and Chicago Grand Opera Company.

After some legal difficulties in New York that blocked her from performing, she held a press conference and declared, "I will sing in San Francisco if I have to sing there in the streets, for I know the streets of San Francisco are free." This line became famous. She won her legal case, and her agent announced she would sing in the streets of San Francisco. On a crystal clear Christmas Eve in 1910, at the corner of Market and Kearney near Lotta's Fountain, Tetrazzini climbed a stage platform in a sparkling white gown, surrounded by a throng of an estimated two to three hundred thousand San Franciscans, and serenaded the city she loved.

Tetrazzini possessed an extraordinary vocal technique that enabled her to surmount any vocal challenge with joyful ease. She had complete mastery of runs, trills, staccati and vocal ornaments of all kinds. She also had a brilliant upper register, extending to F above high C. Unlike many other coloratura sopranos, such as Amelita Galli-Curci, Tetrazzini's high notes were not thin and delicate, but full, powerful and ringing. On the debit side of the ledger, her vocal registers were not as well-integrated as those belonging to her direct soprano rival, Nellie Melba. Also, although her lower register was strong, her middle voice was comparatively thin or 'white' in tone, with a quality which some American and English critics described as "infantile" and "child-like". The Irish tenor John McCormack even compared it, using hyperbole, to "the wailing of a cross infant". With age, however, Tetrazzini's middle register filled out to some extent; and the way that her mid-voice sounded, even when she was younger, does not seem to have troubled the ears of Mediterranean critics, going by their written record.

Tetrazzini was short and grew quite stout as she aged; but she could act effectively on stage, especially in lively or comic roles. She was a good musician, too, and she possessed an amiable, zestful and vivacious personality. These extra-vocal qualities come through on the many records that she made. She recorded extensively for the Victor Talking Machine Company and the Gramophone Company/His Master's Voice. Her best recordings include a spectacular rendition of "Io son Titania" from Ambroise Thomas' Mignon and "Saper vorreste" from Verdi's Un ballo in maschera, in which Tetrazzini's personality virtually jumps out of the grooves at the listener. On a different note, her recording of "Addio, del passato" from La traviata is very moving and also demonstrates her fine legato, as is her "Ah! non credea mirarti" from La sonnambula. Her "Una voce poco fa," and "Ah! non giunge," made for Victor, remain, after all these years, unequalled for their sheer joy, easy virtuosity and spectacular ornamentation.

Tetrazzini had a bitter feud with Nellie Melba while at Covent Garden but was extremely well liked by other colleagues such as Frieda Hempel and Enrico Caruso. Tetrazzini and Caruso had been close friends for many years, and his premature death in 1921 at age 48 left her devastated. After he fell ill, Caruso wrote her a postcard saying "I am waiting for you with open arms, waiting every moment to salute you with a golden note." Unfortunately, she was unable to see him before his death. She is known to have visited his tomb in Naples frequently. Additionally, she obtained permission from the Pope to sing a Requiem Mass on the first anniversary of his passing on 2 August 1922. The two also wrote the book "Caruso and Tetrazzini On the Art of Singing"

Tetrazzini was a frequent traveller on the famous Cunard liner RMS Mauretania. Along with other well-known names, including Irving Berlin and Jerome Kern, she was a member of the ship’s mock secret society of devoted passengers, the Heathens. It was on board the Mauretania in November 1910 that Oscar Hammerstein served her legal papers in an attempt to prevent her from performing under a different manager. During a crossing in April 1912, she sang a requiem recital in the Mauretania's first class lounge in honour of the victims of the Titanic. Her performance took the place of the passenger-led concert in aid of the Seamen’s Charities of Liverpool and New York, a customary event during a transatlantic crossing.

=== Later years ===
After World War I, Tetrazzini largely abandoned the opera stage for the concert platform. She wrote a memoir, My Life of Song, in 1921 and a treatise, How to Sing, in 1923. In 1932, when she was retiring, she was filmed listening to a recording of Caruso's rendition of "M'appari, tutt'amor," and began to sing along with the record showing that her voice still had plenty of power (this video can be seen from the link below under the External Links section). She taught voice after retirement in 1934 and named Lina Pagliughi her successor. Tetrazzini's recordings range from 1904 to 1920. Tetrazzini became a worldwide name and was "glorified even in food, as in the dish Turkey Tetrazzini."

Tetrazzini's thirty-two year career accrued her enormous wealth. Critics described her as singing with youthful abandon, while noting her solid vocal technique. Her emotional interpretation of roles catapulted her to fame and led to comparisons with Patti, Lind, and Melba. Some of her most well-known roles included: Rosina (Il Barbiere di Seviglia), Violetta (La Traviata), and Gilda (Rigoletto). She sang her favorite role, Lucia, over 100 times.

She was married three times and had many passionate affairs during her life. She was the aunt and mentor of the actress Marisa Vernati. Tetrazzini was plagued by legal battles with her third husband, which substantially affected her finances towards the end of her life. She generously gave away the money and belongings that she possessed but remained cheerful and lovable despite her reduced circumstances. She would often say, "I am old, I am fat, but I am still Tetrazzini." Tetrazzini left little behind when she died in Milan on 28 April 1940. Her funeral was honored with a Requiem Mass at the church in Via Casoretto and was attended by close family and friends. She was buried in a mausoleum, of her choosing, with an epitaph from Lucia di Lammermoor: "Alfin son tua." (At last I am yours).

== Writings ==
- My Life of Song (Dorrance & Co, Philadelphia 1922).
- How to Sing (C. Arthur Pearson, London 1923).

== CDs ==
- Luisa Tetrazzini, 2 volumes: 1, 2; Nimbus.
- Luisa Tetrazzini: The Complete Known Recordings (5 volumes); Pearl, Pavilion Records (9220 GEMM CDS)
- Luisa Tetrazzini: The Complete London Recordings (boxed set); EMI
- Luisa Tetrazzini: The Complete Zonophone (1904) and Victor Recordings(1911–20); Romophone.

== See also ==
- Enrico Caruso
- Soprano
- Opera

== Sources ==
- Gattey, Charles Neilson, Luisa Tetrazzini: The Florentine Nightingale (Amadeus Press, Great Britain 1995)
- Kuhn, Laura, ed., “Luisa Tetrazzini,” in Baker’s Dictionary of Opera (New York: Schirmer Books, 2000.), 810.
- Lauri-Volpi, Giacomo, “Coloraturas at the Metropolitan,” in Lily Pons: A Centennial Portrait, ed. James A. Drake and Kirsten Beall Ludecke (Portland, OR: Amadeus Press, 1999.), 38-45.
- Limansky Nicholas E., “Luisa Tetrazzini: Coloratura secrets,” The Opera Quarterly 20, no. 4 (December 2004): 540-569.
- Pleasants, Henry, The Great Singers (Simon & Schuster, New York 1966).
- Scott, Michael, The Record of Singing Vol I (Duckworth, London 1977), 159-161 and passim.
- Shawe-Taylor, Desmond, “Luisa Tetrazzini,” in The New Grove Dictionary of Music and Musicians, 2nd ed., eds. Stanley Sadie and John Tyrrell (London: Macmillan Press, 2001), vol. 26: 318-319.
- Tetrazzini, Luisa, “Introductory Sketch of the Career of the World Famous Prima Donna,” in Caruso and Tetrazzini on the Art of Singing, eds. Enrico Caruso and Luisa Tetrazzini (New York: Dover Publications, 1975), 1-2.
- Tetrazzini, Luisa. My Life of Song. (London: Cassell and Company, LTD., 1921)
- Zicari, Massimo, “‘Ah! non credea mirarti’” nella fonti discografiche di primo Novecento: Adelina Patti e Luisa Tetrazzini,” in Schweitzer Jahrbuch fur Musikwissenschaft-Annales Suisses de Musicologie. Schweitzer Jahrbuch fur Musikwissenschaft, ed. Luca Zoppelli (Bern: Peter Lang Publishing, 2017), vol. 34-35: 193-217.
