= Julián Gayarre =

Spanish opera singer (1844–1890)

- Gayarre circa 1870
- Born: Sebastián Julián Gayarre Garjón; 9 January 1844; Roncal (Navarre), Spain
- Died: 2 January 1890 (aged 45); Madrid, Spain

Sebastián Julián Gayarre Garjón (9 January 1844 in Roncal, Navarre, Spain – 2 January 1890 in Madrid, Spain), better known as Julián Gayarre, was a Spanish opera singer who created the role of Marcello in Donizetti's Il Duca d'Alba and Enzo in Ponchielli's La Gioconda.

Although he faced strong competition for this title from the likes of Roberto Stagno, Italo Campanini, Angelo Masini and Francesco Tamagno, Gayarre was regarded by many late 19th-century music commentators as being the supreme Italianate tenor of his generation.

== Biography ==
The man who was to become one of Europe's most celebrated singers was born and raised in a Navarre family in the small Pyrenean town of Roncal. The third child of Mariano Gayarre and Maria Ramona Garjón, a couple of modest means, he left school at 13 to work as a shepherd. When he was 15, his father sent him to Pamplona to work in a shop. It was there that he had his first contact with music. It was a passion that would cost him his job when he was fired for leaving the shop to follow a band that was parading in the street outside.

He then worked as a blacksmith in the village of Lumbier and later in Pamplona at the Pinaqui foundry. One of his fellow workers, who heard him singing as he worked, encouraged him to join the Orfeón Pamplonés, the city's newly formed choir directed by Joaquin Maya. Maya took him on as first tenor and introduced him to the celebrated music teacher and composer, Hilarión Eslava. Eslava, struck by the beautiful timbre of the yet untrained voice, arranged a scholarship for Gayarre to study at the Madrid Royal Conservatory. His first public performance was in 1867 with a zarzuela company in Tudela under the stage name of "Sandoval".

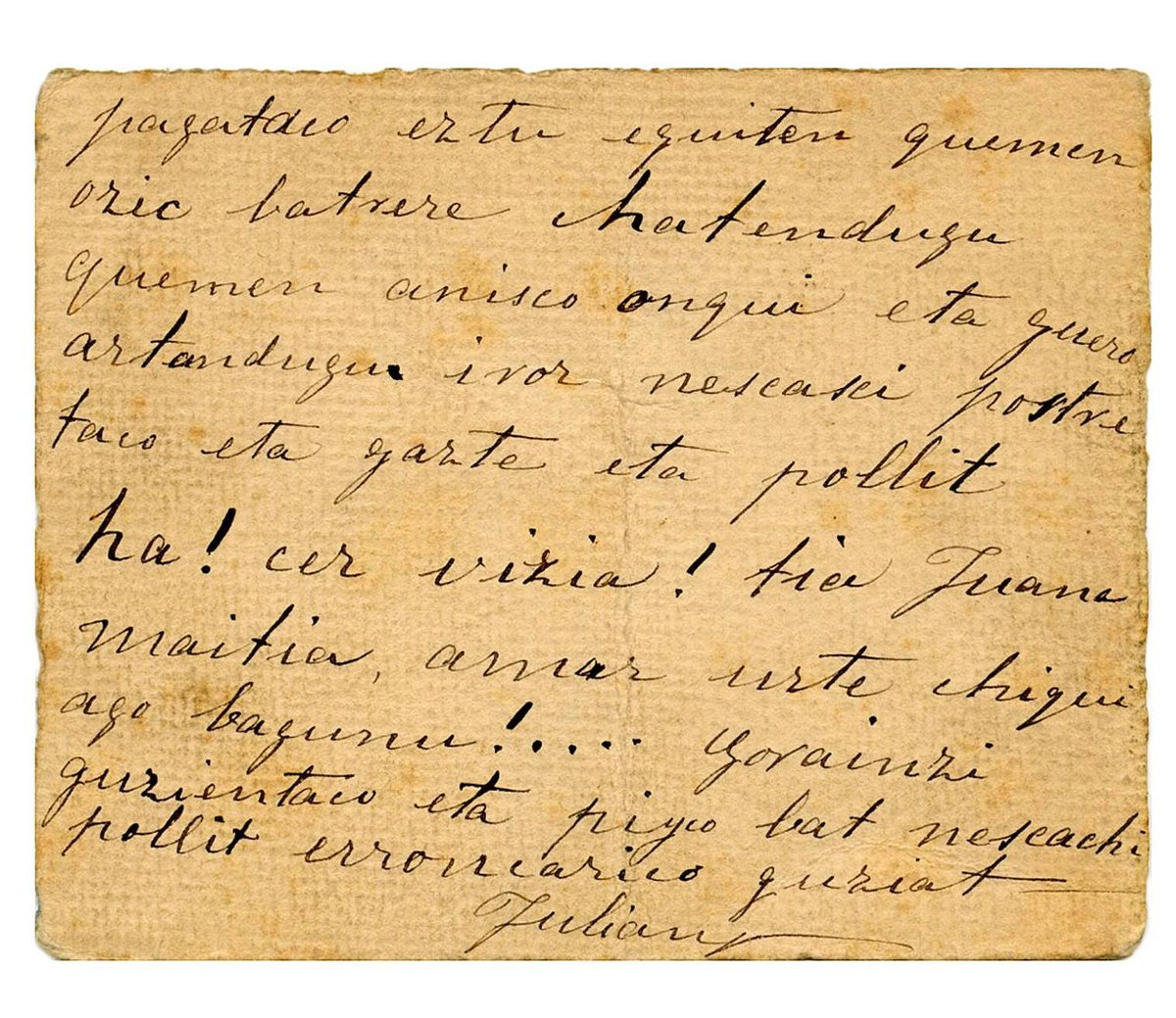
Letter addressed by Gayarre to his aunt, handwritten in Basque

After leaving the conservatory in 1868, he sang in the chorus of zarzuela productions in Madrid, but after being dismissed by the theatre manager, Joaquín Gaztambide, he returned penniless to Roncal. Encouraged by Hilarión Eslava, his admirers, led by Conrado García, one of the founders of the Orfeón Pamplonés organized a successful recital in Pamplona which persuaded the Provincial Council of Navarre to grant him funds to pursue further studies with Giuseppe Gerli at the Milan Conservatory.

In 1869, shortly after commencing his studies in Milan, Gayarre made his operatic debut as Nemorino in L'elisir d'amore in Varese. Particularly renowned for his interpretation of Fernando in La Favorita, he was also considered by critics of the time, especially in Italy, to be an excellent actor with a commanding stage presence. Gayarre's earliest successes and fame came from his performances in the major opera houses of Italy, where he created the role of Marcello in Il Duca d'Alba in 1871 and Enzo in the 1876 premiere of La Gioconda. However, he was soon highly in demand in Paris and London as well as his native Spain. Gayarre also sang in Lisbon, Vienna and Saint Petersburg and toured Brazil and Argentina with the Spanish contralto Elena Sanz, a frequent stage partner, especially at La Scala. Towards the end of his career, in 1887, he sang Sobinin in the first London performance of Glinka's A Life for the Tsar.

Gayarre sang a broad repertoire, ranging from bel canto works to the earlier music-dramas composed by Wagner. In the 1870/71 season, at the Teatro Regio di Parma, he sang with great success in a trio of Verdi operas, I Lombardi alla prima crociata, Un ballo in maschera and Rigoletto. In October 1872 at the Teatro Comunale di Bologna, he sang Amenophis in Rossini's Moïse et Pharaon. Only a month later, he sang the title role in Wagner's Tannhäuser there, its first performance in Italy. Gayarre's other great Wagnerian role was Lohengrin which he sang in its first ever performance at the Teatro Real in Madrid in 1881. However, the following year he was back in the bel canto repertoire with performances of I puritani and La favorita at Valladolid's Teatro Calderón. Gayarre was also a noted interpreter of the French repertoire including Gounod's Faust and Meyerbeer's Les Huguenots, Le prophète and L'Africaine.

The peak of Gayarre's career lasted from 1873 to 1886, after which he was plagued by recurrent respiratory illness, causing his voice to deteriorate. On 8 December 1889 at the Teatro Real in Madrid, he appeared on stage for the last time in Bizet's Les pêcheurs de perles, where his voice cracked noticeably in Nadir's aria, 'Je crois entendre encore'. It was reported that he knelt down murmuring "No puedo cantar más" ("I cannot sing anymore") and disappeared into the wings. He was eventually called back to the stage by the sympathetic audience, but he was heard to say, "Esto se acabó" ("This is the end"). He died 25 days later at the age of 45 and was buried in the cemetery of Roncal, very near the house where he was born.

In 1901, his grave was marked with an elaborate marble and bronze mausoleum by the noted Spanish sculptor, Mariano Benlliure., and two years later, Pamplona renamed its Teatro Principal in his honor. Gayarre is also commemorated in Pamplona with a biennial competition for young singers, El Concurso Internacional de Canto Julián Gayarre.

The letters Gayarre used to send to his family when he was abroad are considered by linguists a treasure, as they represent some of the best samples from the Basque dialect of Roncal, now extinct.

== Voice ==
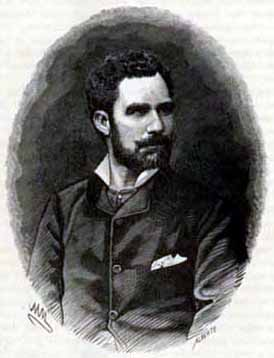
Julián Gayarre circa 1880

Julián Gayarre wrote in a letter to his friend Julio Enciso:

The stage artist's glory is like the dream of one night. A painter, a poet, a composer leaves behind his works. From us, what is left?... Nothing, absolutely nothing. One generation that says to another: 'How Gayarre sang!'... When my throat says to me: 'I can no longer sing', what will remain of Gayarre? A name that will last as long as the people who heard me, but after that no one. Believe me, Julio my friend, our glory does not last longer, nor is it worth more, than cigar smoke.

There are no known recordings of Gayarre, who died when sound recording technology was still in its earliest infancy. What we know of his voice comes from contemporary accounts. The playwright and music critic George Bernard Shaw reproached Gayarre during his London appearances for displaying an excessive vibrato and "artificial" vocal mannerisms. Italian and Spanish critics, however, were more admiring of Gayarre's voice and style. Their collective opinions are encapsulated by the following assessment published in the 1963 Ricordi Enciclopedia della musica:

Gayarre's voice was slightly guttural and at times could show hardness in the very high notes and an uncertain attack. Nevertheless, it was full, resonant and extraordinarily fascinating. He was distinguished for his breath control, extremely clear diction, vibrant and passionate tone and for his ability to both soften and strengthen that tone. The way he produced contrasts of colour and intensity was incomparable. Yet he sometimes over-used unexpected contrasts of fortissimo and pianissimo and he also seemed to sometimes slow down the tempo excessively. [...] When he sang La favorita at La Scala on 2 January 1876, the audience was harsh and indifferent. However, the next day, the critic, Filippi, wrote that the Milanese audience had been present not at the debut of a tenor but at the "consecration of a genius of singing."

It adds:

In the decade 1876-1886 the critic, Leone Forti, wrote: "He is a tenor who sings. We were no longer accustomed to it, we had forgotten what it was like. In addition to this, he is a tenor with a slim physique, whose way of moving and gestures are those of a real man. [...] He has the gift of uniting the colours of three different tenors, blending then together to create something uniquely his own."

Contemporaries called Fernando Valero "little Gayarre", suggesting that their voices were in some way similar, and Jacinto Benavente the playwright stated that Leonid Sobinov's voice was closest to Gayarre's in sound and timbre.

== In film ==
There have been several Spanish films based on his life, most notably:

- El Canto del ruiseñor (1932), directed by Carlos San Martín with José Romeu as Gayarre
- Gayarre (1959) directed by Domingo Viladomat with Alfredo Kraus as Gayarre.
- Romanza Final (1986) directed by José María Forqué with José Carreras as Gayarre.

All of them contain some fictional or semi-fictional elements, particularly Romanza Final.
