= Carlo Ferrario (painter) =

Italian architect, designer, and painter (1833–1907)

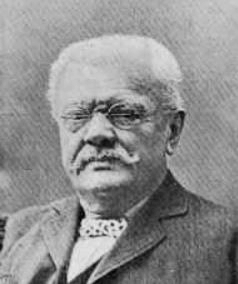
Carlo Ferrario (date unknown)

Carlo Ferrario (7 September 1833, Milan – 11 May 1907, Milan) was an Italian set, costume, scenic designer, painter, and architect.

== Biography ==
Carlo Ferrario was born to Giuseppe Ferrario, a blacksmith, and his wife Francesca (née Basulli). While still a boy, Ferrario was forced to drop out of school and find a job to support himself. One of his jobs was tending the shop for a local decorator. Already interested in the theatre, this inspired him to copy the curtains and draperies he saw there. In 1852, he enrolled in the night courses at the Brera Academy, where he studied under the guidance of Enrico Robecchi (1827-1889). The following year, he was hired at La Scala as an assistant to the stage manager. In 1859 Luigi Bisi, professor of perspective at the academy, invited him to work as an associate professor.

In 1867, Ferrario was nominated co-director at La Scala in 1867 and, the following year, became the Director of Scenography. During this period, he created curtains for several theatres in Milan. In 1878, he also provided stage settings for the opera Salvator Rosa, at the Teatro Argentina in Rome.

Due to disagreements with the theatre's management company over the necessity of a technical laboratory for designers, Ferrario left La Scala in 1881 and went to the Teatro Carcano. There, he worked without an assistant and often collaborated with other theatres, including the Teatro di San Carlo in Naples. He returned to La Scala in 1887, at the request of Giuseppe Verdi, who wanted him to produce the settings for Otello. This led to Ferrario's reinstatement and the establishment of a new workshop as he had originally requested. During the 1890s, he worked with Verdi on two more opera productions, Falstaff and Rigoletto, as well as the Italian premieres of several works by Wagner.

In addition to his theatre work, Ferrario painted landscapes and architectural interior scenes in oil and watercolours. These included six panels for the new façade at Milan Cathedral. They were awarded the Canonica Prize in 1883. Together with Giuseppe Bertini, he decorated some rooms at the Turati Palace in Milan. In 1882, he participated in the competition for a monument dedicated to Victor Emmanuel II, for which he was awarded a gold medal.

A collection of approximately 600 drawings and sketches of Ferrario's designs is housed at the La Scala Museum. Others are at the Casa Ricordi publishing house and in private collections, including the Donald Oenslager collection in New York.

== Selected works ==
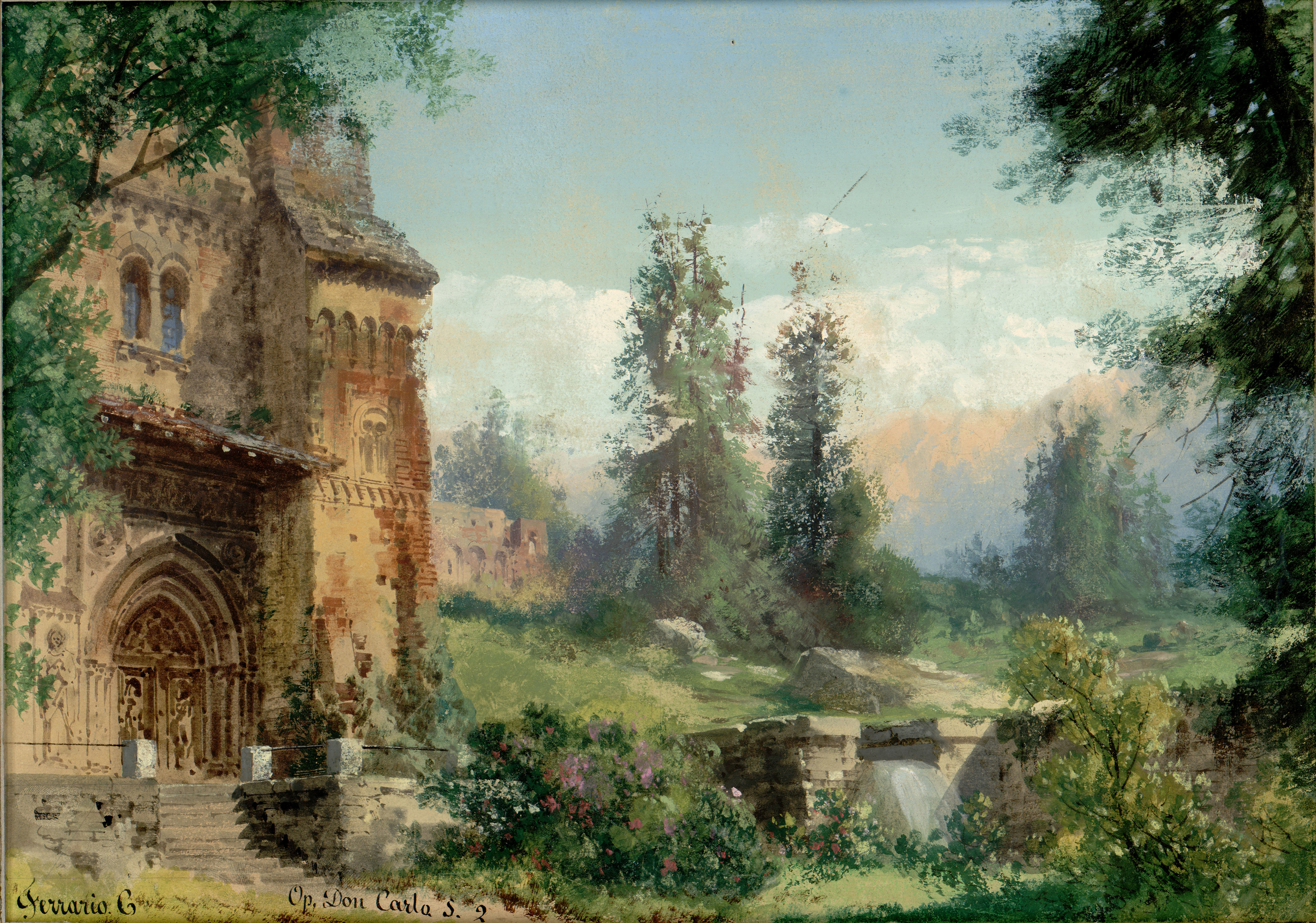
Don Carlos, Act I, Scene II

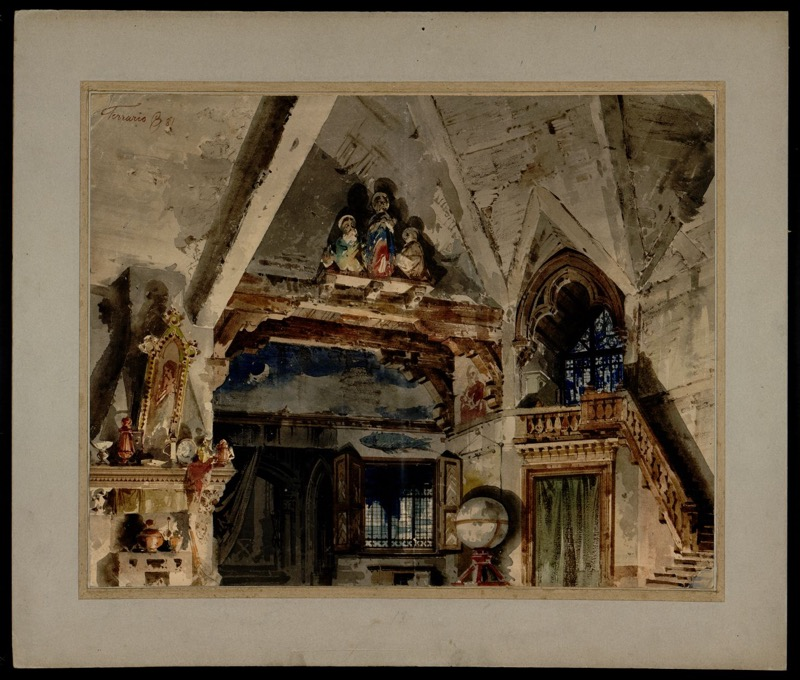
Faust's Laboratory, Act I, Scene II, Mefistofele by Arrigo Boito

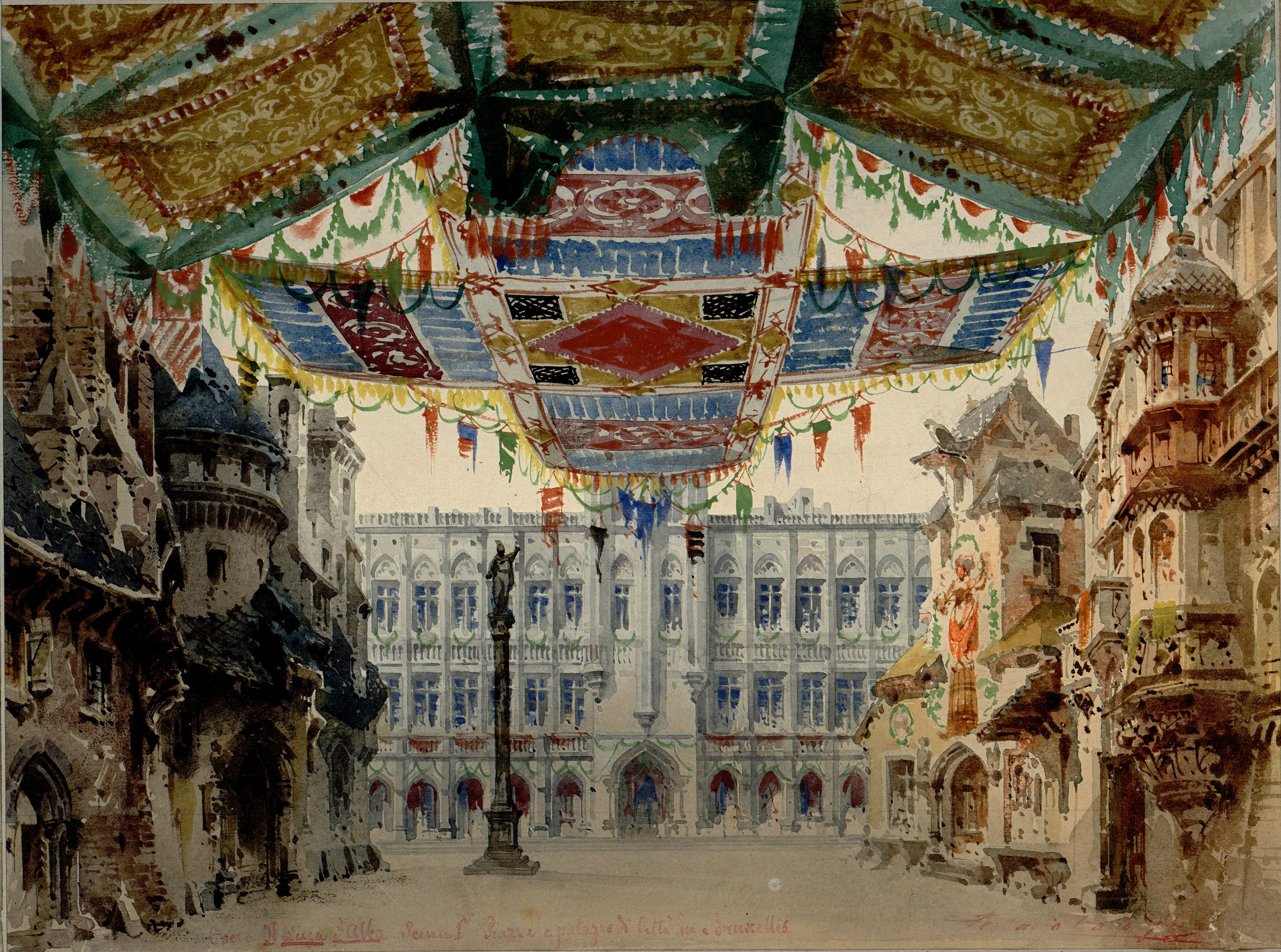
The City Palace in Brussels, for Il duca d'Alba,
by Donizetti

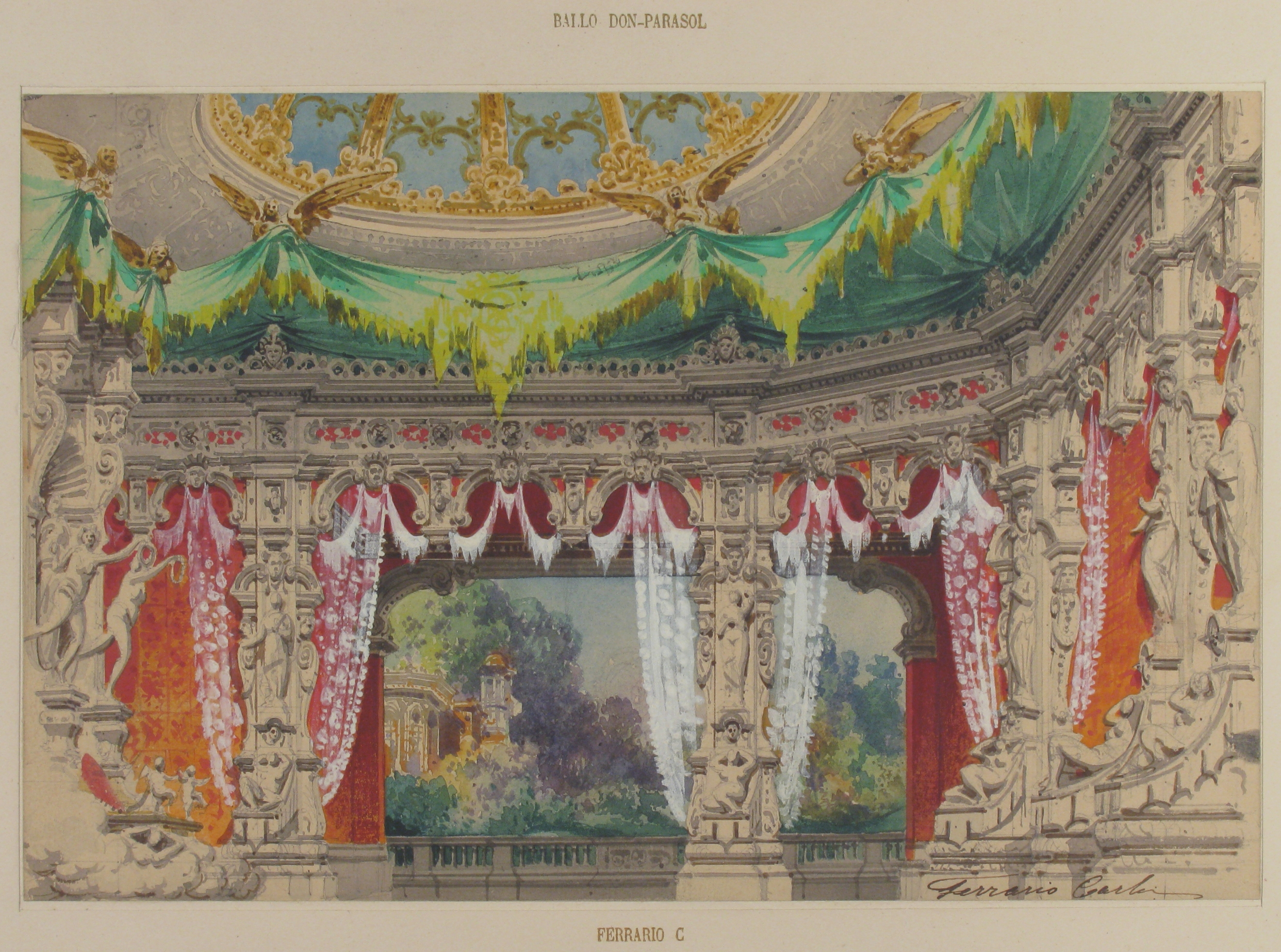
Design for the ballet Don Parasol

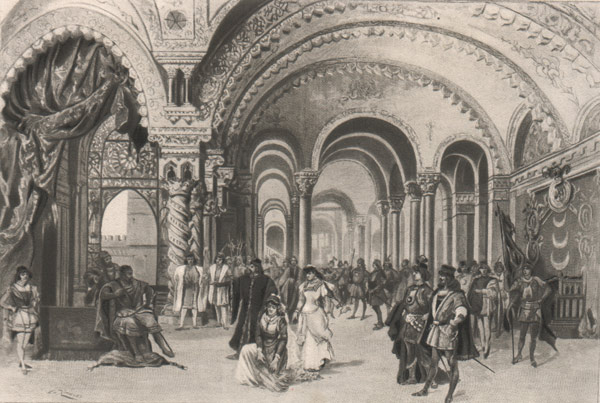
Otello, Act III
