= George Petean =

Romanian operatic baritone (born 1976)

George Petean (born 1976 in Cluj-Napoca) is a Romanian operatic baritone.

== Biography ==
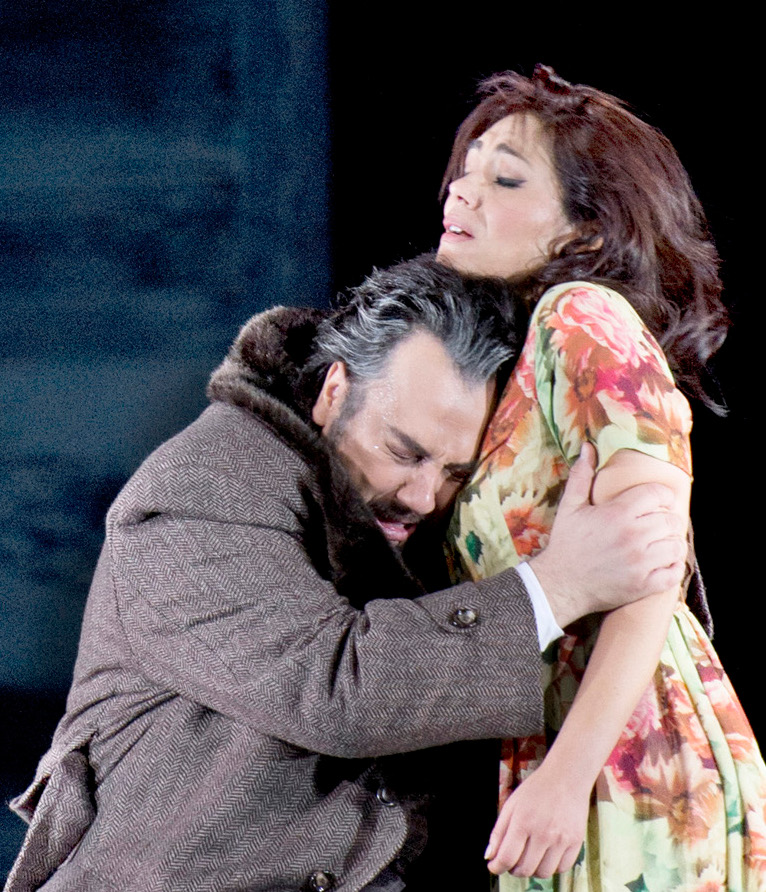
George Petean with Ailyn Pérez in La traviata at the Hamburg State Opera 2013

Petean studied at the Gheorghe Dima Music Academy in his city of birth and made his debut in the title role of Don Giovanni in Timișoara in 1997. He subsequently performed leading baritone roles both there and in Cluj-Napoca, making his first international appearance at the Rome Opera as Marcello in La bohème in 2000. Petean was a member of the ensemble of the Hamburg Opera from 2002 until 2010, appearing in numerous roles, and has also performed as a guest artist in many of the world's leading opera houses including Teatro Real, Bavarian State Opera, Paris Opéra, Staatsoper Wien, Teatro Regio di Parma and Berlin State Opera. He made his debut at the Metropolitan Opera New York as Marcello in 2010 and returned in the role of Valentin in Faust in 2012 and as Germont in La traviata in 2017. Petean made his first appearance with The Royal Opera London as Silvio in Pagliacci in 2003 and subsequently sang the roles of Figaro in The Barber of Seville, Marcello and Germont there. He is particularly noted for his performances in Verdi operas and performed the title role in that composer's Simon Boccanegra (with Rome Opera House in 2012, Opera Australia in 2016 and with the Dutch National Opera in 2026)) and Macbeth (with Wiener Staatsoper in 2019).

== Discography ==
- Mascagni, L'amico Fritz. CD: Deutsche Grammophon Cat: 4778358
- Verdi, Rigoletto. DVD: Accentus Music Cat:PHR0203
- Verdi, Luisa Miller. DVD: BR Klassik Cat:900323
- Verdi, Un ballo in maschera. DVD: C Major Cat:739507
- Verdi, La traviata. CD: Prima Classic Cat:PRIMA003
- Verdi, Attila. DVD: BR Klassik Cat:900330
