= Tu che le vanità =

Aria by Verdi

The aria 'Tu che le vanità' from the Ricordi 4-act Italian piano-vocal score

"Tu che le vanità" (French: "Toi qui sus le néant", lit. 'You who knew the emptiness') is an aria for soprano from the first scene of the final act of Verdi's 1867 opera Don Carlo. It was composed to a French text and later translated into Italian, the language in which it is most well known and most often performed. It is sometimes performed in recitals and featured in anthologies for dramatic sopranos. Sopranos also use it as an audition piece, as it displays the singer's high and low registers, forte and pianissimo volumes, legato bel canto singing technique, and several dramatic emotions such as reverence, longing, and resignation.

== Sentiment ==
The aria begins with a long, c. 3 minutes, orchestral prelude. Élisabeth de Valois, a young French Princess whom the elderly King Philip II of Spain has married for political reasons, prays at the tomb of the former Emperor King Carlos V. She asks that he weep for her suffering and offer his tears to the Almighty on her behalf. She anticipates the arrival of her stepson and former fiancé Don Carlo, whom she has piously rejected after marrying his father the King in order to strengthen the alliance of their two nations. She prays that Carlos will fulfil his destiny as a great, benevolent ruler of Spain. She recalls her homeland, and her happiness during her short engagement to Carlos. She longs for the peace which she will have in her grave. A performance takes between 10 and 12 minutes.

== Text ==
The French libretto to Don Carlos was by Joseph Méry and Camille du Locle. The aria's French incipit is "Toi qui sus le néant". The libretto was translated into Italian by Achille De Lauzières.

Italian
Tu che le vanità conoscesti del mondo
E godi nell'avel il riposo profondo,
Se ancor si piange in cielo, piangi sul mio dolor,
E porta il pianto mio al trono del Signor.

Carlo qui verrà! Sì, che parta e scordi omai...
A Posa di vegliar sui giorni suoi giurai.
Ei segua il suo destin, la gloria il traccierà.
Per me, la mia giornata a sera è giunta già!

Francia, nobile suol, sì caro ai miei verd'anni!
Fontainebleau! Ver voi schiude il pensiero i vanni.
Eterno giuro d'amor, là Dio da me ascoltò,
E quest'eternità un giorno sol durò.

Tra voi, vaghi giardin di questa terra ibéra,
Se Carlo ancor dovrà fermare i passi a sera,
Che le zolle, i ruscelli, i fonti, i boschi, i fior,
Con le loro armonie cantino il nostro amor.

Addio, bei sogni d'ôr, illusion perduta!
Il nodo si spezzò, la luce è fatta muta!
Addio, verd'anni, ancor! Cedendo al duol crudel,
Il core ha un sol desir: la pace dell'avel!

Tu che le vanità conoscesti del mondo
E godi nell'avel il riposo profondo,
Se ancor si piange in cielo, piangi sul mio dolor,
E porta il pianto mio al trono del Signor.

French
Toi qui sus le néant des grandeurs de ce monde,
Toi qui goûtes enfin la paix douce et profonde,
Si l'on répand encore des larmes dans le ciel,
Porte en pleurant mes pleurs aux pieds de l'Éternel!

Carlos va venir!....Oui! Qu'il parte, qu'il oublie...
J'ai promis à Posa de veiller sur sa vie,
Qu'il suive son chemin glorieux et béni!
Pour moi, ma tâche est faite, et mon jour est fini!

France, noble pays, si cher à mon jeune âge!
Fontainebleau! Mon coeur est plein de votre image...
C'est là que Dieu reçut notre éternel serment;
Et son éternité n'a duré qu'un moment...

Beaux jardins espagnols, à l'heure pâle et sombre,
Si Carlos doit encor s'arrêter sous votre ombre,
Que vos fleurs, vos gazons, vos fontaines, vos bois,
Chantent mon souvenir avec toutes leurs voix!

Adieu, rêve doré... illusion!... chimère!...
Tout lien est brisé qui m'attache à la terre!
Adieu, jeunesse, amour!... Succombant sous l'effort,
Mon coeur n'a qu'un seul voeu, c'est la paix dans la mort

Toi qui sus le néant des grandeurs de ce monde,
Toi qui goûtes enfin la paix douce et profonde,
Si l'on répand encore des larmes dans le ciel,
Porte en pleurant mes pleurs aux pieds de l'Éternel!

== Cultural references ==
Tu che le vanità is the title of a 1981 novel by Italian musicologist and author Rodolfo Celletti.
