= La source (Saint-Léon) =

Ballet in three acts/four scenes

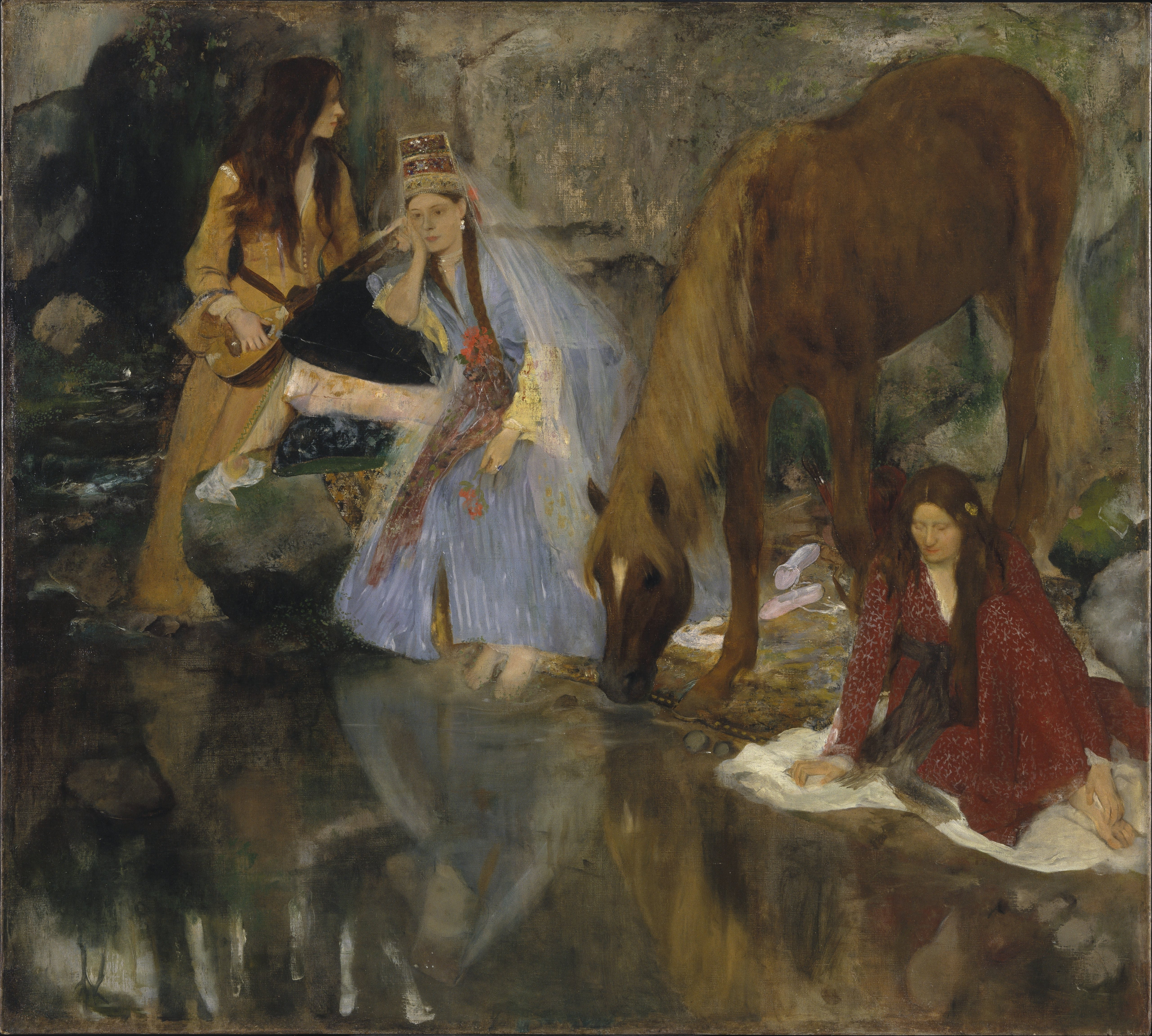
Eugénie Fiocre in La Source, painting by Edgar Degas, circa 1868

La source (The Spring) is a ballet in three acts/four scenes with a score composed by Léo Delibes and Ludwig Minkus (Minkus: Act I & Act III-Scene 2/Delibes: Act II & Act III-Scene 1) which was premiered in Paris in 1866 with choreography by Arthur Saint-Léon. In 1878 in Vienna it was called Naïla, die Quellenfee (Naïla, the Waternymph).

== History ==
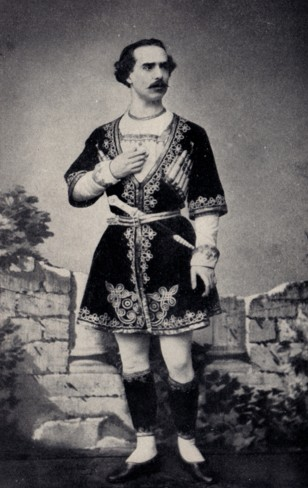
Louis Mérante as Djémil in La Source, Paris, 1866

The choreography was by Arthur Saint-Léon, who collaborated with Charles Nuitter in the libretto. The original designs were by Édouard Desplechin, Jean-Baptiste Lavastre, Auguste Rubé, Chaperon (sets) and Paul Lormier (costumes). The first production opened at the Théâtre Impérial de l´Opéra in Paris on 12 November 1866, with Guglielmina Salvioni (Naïla), Eugenie Fiocre (Nouredda) and Louis Mérante (Djémil) in the principal roles. The production was not particularly successful, Salvioni being considered unsuited to the rôle of Naïla. It triumphed in the following year, however, with Adèle Grantzow as Naïla, and remained a mainstay of the repertory for the next few years. A successful revival in 1872 showcased Rita Sangalli in the principal rôle, and it was for this production that the new variations for Naïla were introduced, the music most likely by Delibes himself (Nos. 12b and 23a in the list of musical numbers in the piano score, see below).

Delibes was second chorus master at the Paris Opera and had until then written operettas, songs and sacred music. A comparison of the music of the two composers greatly favoured Delibes, whose contributions were considered "fresh and more rhythmic", with one critic suggesting that the whole ballet score should have been assigned to Delibes. La source was his first big success, marking him as an important composer for the ballet.

La source was produced in St Petersburg in 1902 with Olga Preobrajenska as Naïla, choreographed by Achille Coppini. In 1907 Nijinsky made his solo debut in the last act of La source at the Mariinsky.

The ballet was revived in 1925 by Agrippina Vaganova to the Theatre of Opera and Ballet in Leningrad to her pupil Marina Semyonova – Marina Semyonova started to work on the scene from this ballet.

A video of the La source pas de deux taken from the 2008 graduation performance of the Vaganova Academy of Russian Ballet at the Mariinsky Theatre, St. Petersburg, may be found on YouTube, with the choreography credited to Konstantin Sergeyev after Coppini and possibly created for Preobrajenskaya. The music is by Riccardo Drigo, composer of most of the additional dances added to the company's repertory in the early 20th century.

== Synopsis ==
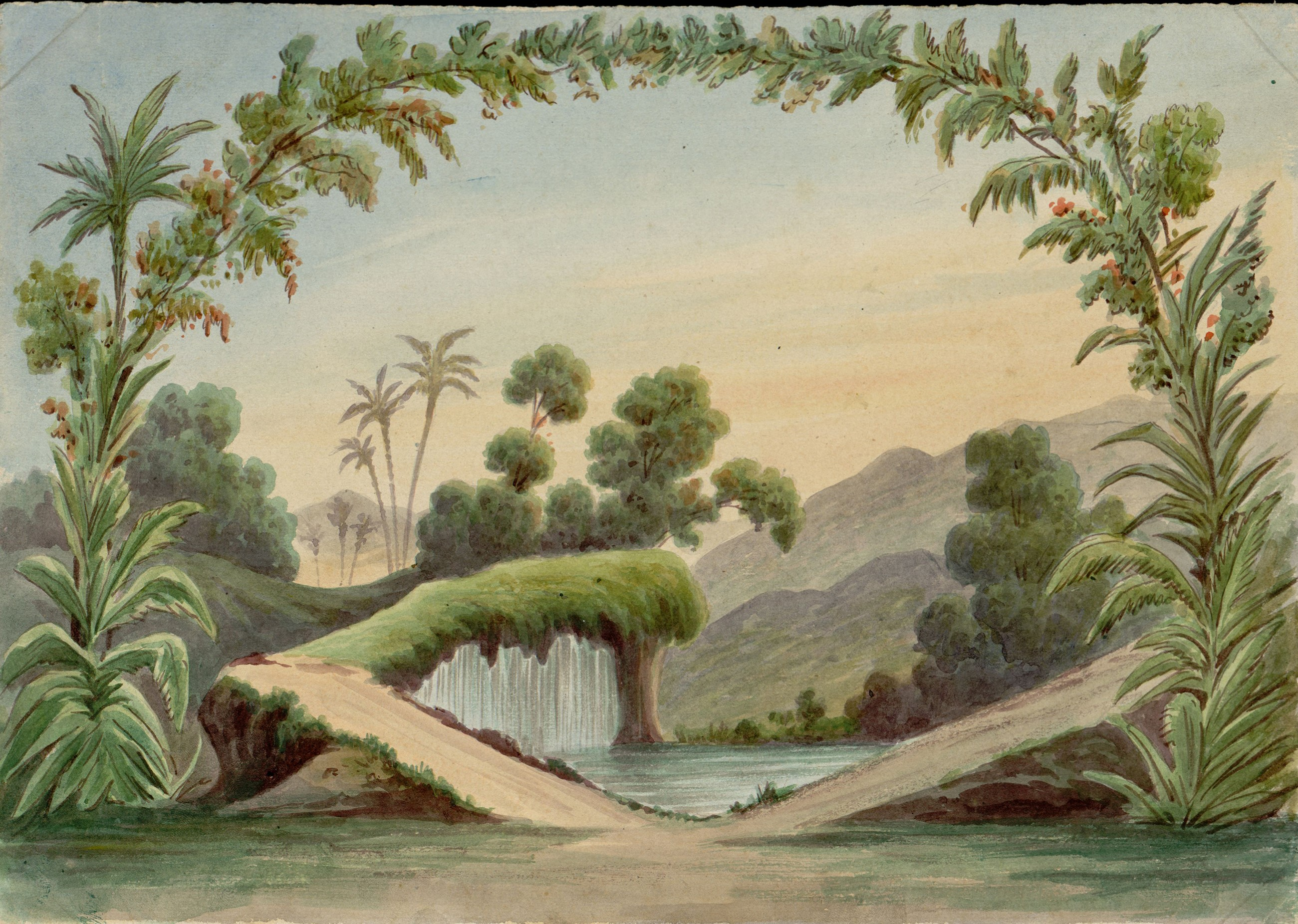
Una gola in mezzo ad alte montagne, set design for La Sorgente (1889).

Act 1. On her way to marry the Khan of Ghendjib, the beautiful Nouredda and her accompanying party rest by a stream in a rocky desert. When Nouredda admires a flower which is growing in an inaccessible spot, Djémil, a young hunter, climbs up and picks it for her. Nouredda is thrilled and asks him to state whatever he wishes as his reward. He asks her to lift her veil so that he can see her face: in fury she orders that he be tied up and left to his fate. However, the nymph Naïla rescues him; she is in love with him and promises to help him win the hand of Nouredda.

Act 2. In the grand palace gardens, where the court of Khan is awaiting Nouredda's arrival, entertainment is offered to the guests: a solo for the favourites and a dance for Circassian slaves. A fanfare proclaims a visitor, incognito (Djémil), who proffers presents for the Khan and his bride. The visitor asks Nouredda to choose any of the gifts and she selects a jewelled flower. Djémil throws it on the ground and magically a spring gushes forth from this spot and Naïla emerges from the fountain. She dances, entrancing the Khan, who kneels in front of her and he implores her to become his wife. She consents, provided he dismisses Nouredda, who angrily goes off as the Khan leads Naïla inside the palace.

Act 3. Djémil can now pursue Nouredda but she still rejects him; so he appeals to Naïla, who says that if he gets Nouredda to love him she herself will die. Djémil agrees, and as he departs with Nouredda, Naïla disappears back into the earth and the spring dries up.

== Musical numbers, following the piano score of 1880 ==
Act 1 (Léon Minkus)

- Prélude
- 1. Introduction fantastique
- 2. L'Ephémère – Scène dansée
- 3. Scène
- 4. Marche de la caravane
- 5. Berceuse
- 6. Pas de la guzla
  - a) Andantino
  - b) Vivace
- 7. Scène
- 8. Scène dansée (Apparition de Naïla)
- 9. Valse
- 10. Scène et danse
- 11. Danse des sylphes et des lutins
- 12. Variation
  - a) Variation de Naïla (Mlle. Salvioni) (1860)
  - b) Nouvelle variation de Naíla (Mlle. Sangalli) (1872, replacing No. 12a)
- 13. Scène et danse
- 14. Galop
- 15. Scène finale

Act 2 (Léo Delibes)

- Introduction
- 16. Scène
- 17. Scène: Arrivée de Nouredda
- 18. Divertissement
  - a) Pas des voiles
  - b) Andante
  - c) Variation
  - d) Danse circassienne
- 19. Scène
- 20. Pas de Naïla. Scherzo-Polka
- 21. Scène et pas d'action
- 22. Mazurka
- 23 Scène
  - a) Nouvelle variation de Naïla (Mlle Sangalli) (1872, replacing No. 20)
  - b) Scène
- 24. Marche dansée et final

Act 3, Scene 1 (Léo Delibes)

- Introduction
- 25. Scène
- 26. Romance
- 27. Final

Act 3, Scene 2 (Léon Minkus)

- 28 Scène
- 29 Scène et danse

== The 'Naïla' valse ==
Delibes was asked in 1867 to add a divertissement, known as either 'Le jardin animé' or 'Le pas des fleurs', to a revival of Adolphe Adam's ballet 'Le Corsaire'. Part of his contribution was the waltz frequently known as the 'Naïla' waltz. It appears that it was transferred to one of the productions of 'La Source' when it was performed under the name of 'Naïla'. There are references to a version of that name using only Delibes's original music, although exact details are elusive. One might assume that it was for this production that the 'Le Corsaire' divertissement found its way into the score of 'Naïla'.

== La Source suites ==
Three orchestral suites consisting of excerpts from the ballet were arranged either by Delibes or another hand. The 2nd suite contains some music by Minkus, although the suites are attributed to Delibes.

Suite 1

- a) Pas des écharpes (No. 18a, 'Pas des voiles', Delibes)
- b) Variation (No. 18c, 'Variation', Delibes)
- c) Scène d'amour (No. 18b, 'Andante', Delibes)
- d) Danse circassienne (No. 18d, 'Danse circassienne', Delibes)

Suite 2

- a) Scène dansée (A conflation of parts of No. 19, 'Scène', No. 17, 'Scène. Arrivée de Nouredda' and No. 16, 'Scène', all Delibes.)
- b) Scherzo-Polka (No. 20, 'Scherzo-Polka', Delibes)
- c) Pas de la guzla (No. 6a, '[Pas de la guzla] Andantino', Minkus, followed by part of No. 16, 'Scène', Delibes)
- d) Marche dansée et Final (No. 23b, 'Scène', Delibes, followed by No. 24, 'Marche dansée et Final', Delibes)

Suite 3

- a) Incantation (Sections 2 and 3 of No. 25, 'Scène', Delibes, arranged in reverse order)
- b) Romance (Section 1 of No. 25, 'Scène', Delibes, followed by No. 26, 'Romance', Delibes)
- c) Introduction et Mazurka (No. 23a, 'Nouvelle Variation de Naïla', Delibes, followed by No. 22, 'Mazurka', Delibes.)
- d) Finale (Opening measures of No. 16, 'Scène', followed by No. 21, 'Grand Pas d'action', and slightly abbreviated arrangement of No. 27, 'Final'. Delibes)

The suites contain almost all of Delibes's contribution to La Source, albeit arranged in an order designed for concert performance.

== Other productions ==
- Teatro alla Scala with choreography by Cesare Marzagora after Saint-Léon, Milan, 1875/1876
- New York City Ballet, choreography by George Balanchine, premiere 23 November, New York State Theater, Lincoln Center, 1968

== Discography ==
Complete score (with cuts)

- Richard Bonynge and the Orchestra of the Royal Opera House (1990) (Decca)

Suites

- Andrew Mogrelia and the Slovak Radio Orchestra (1995) (Naxos) – Suites 2 and 3 only
- Victor Olof and the Suisse Romande Orchestra (1953) (Decca) – Suite 1 only (LW 5034)

Excerpts from Delibes part of the score

- Charles Mackerras and the Orchestra of the Royal Opera House (1956) (EMI)
- Peter Maag and the Paris Conservatoire Orchestra (1958) (Decca)

Le jardin animé – Delibes contribution to Adolphe Adam's 'Le Corsaire', including the 'Naïla' waltz

- Richard Bonynge and the English Chamber Orchestra (1992) (Decca)

The CHARM database also lists other recordings of excerpts from the ballet: the Orchestre du Théâtre national de l'Opéra-Comique conducted by Albert Wolff (1956) for Pathé, and the Orchestre philharmonique de Paris conducted by Gustave Cloëz (1930) for Odéon.
