= La Juive =

Opera by Fromental Halévy

- Grand opera by Fromental Halévy
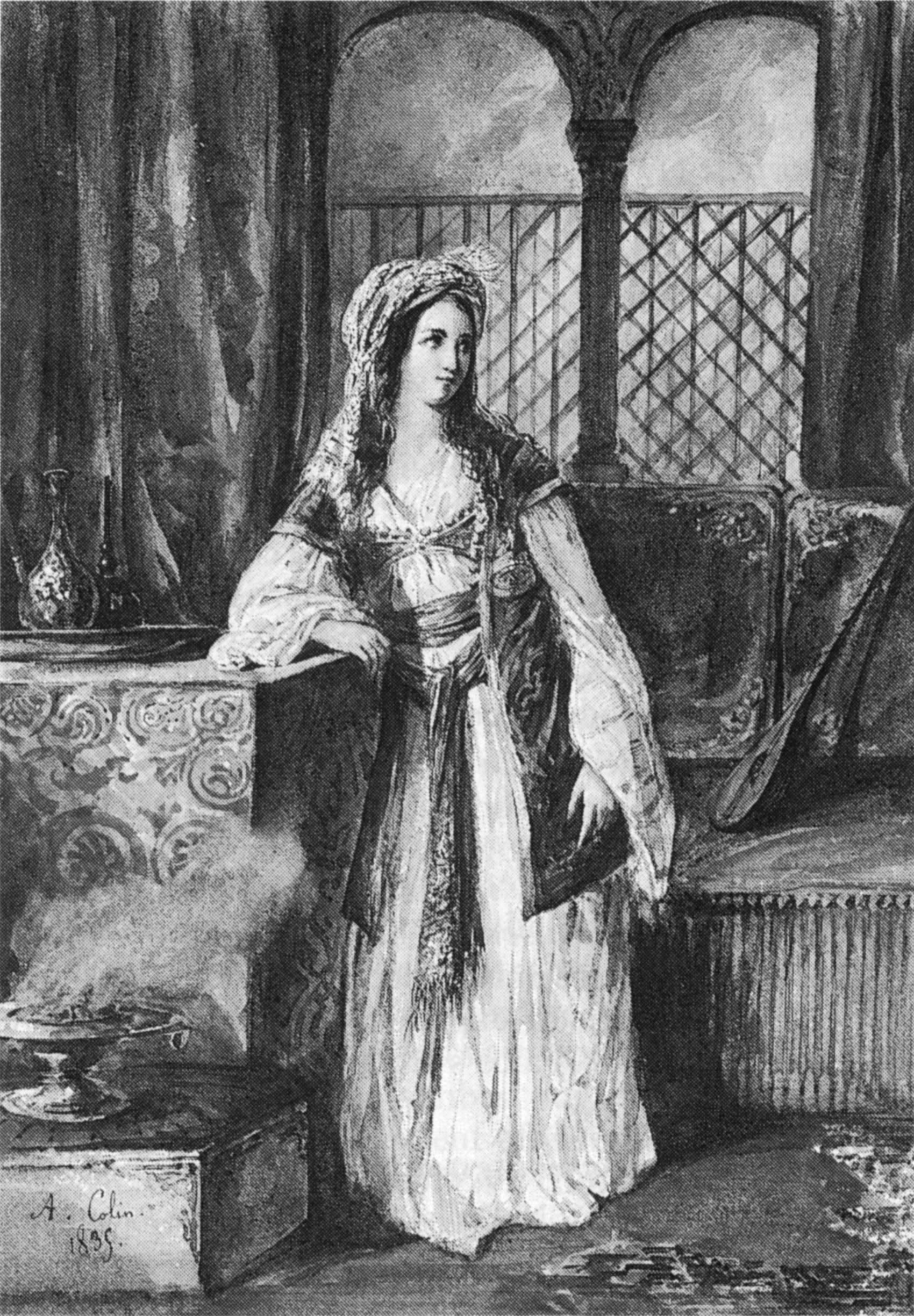
- Cornélie Falcon as Rachel, the title role, portrait by A. Colin (1835)
- Translation: The Jewess
- Librettist: Eugène Scribe
- Language: French
- Premiere: 23 February 1835; Opéra National de Paris

La Juive (French pronunciation: [la ʒɥiv], lit. 'The Jewess') is a grand opera in five acts by Fromental Halévy to an original French libretto by Eugène Scribe; it was first performed at the Opéra de Paris, on 23 February 1835.

== Composition history ==
La Juive was one of the most popular and admired operas of the 19th century. Its libretto was the work of Eugène Scribe, the prolific dramatic author. Scribe was writing to the tastes of the Opéra de Paris, where the work was first performed – a work in five acts presenting spectacular situations (here the Council of Constance of 1414), which would allow a flamboyant staging in a setting which brought out a dramatic situation which was also underlined by a powerful historical subject. In addition to this, there could be choral interludes, ballet and scenic effects which took advantage of the entire range of possibilities available at the Paris Opera.

Because of the story of an impossible love between a Christian man and a Jewish woman, the work has been seen by some as a plea for religious tolerance, in much the same spirit as Nathan the Wise, which premiered in 1779, Giacomo Meyerbeer's Les Huguenots which premiered in 1836, a year after La Juive, as well as the 1819 novel Ivanhoe by Sir Walter Scott which deals with the same theme. At the time of composition, the July Monarchy had liberalised religious practices in France. Meyerbeer and Fromental Halévy were both Jewish, and storylines dealing with topics of tolerance were common in their operas. Reviews of the initial performances show that journalists of the period responded to the liberalism and to the perceived anti-clericalism of Scribe's text rather than to any specifically Jewish theme.

Some believe that the libretto of La Juive was designed to provoke audiences to reassess the status of Jews in French society. Others believe that the clichéd portrayal of the Jew Eléazar as secretive, vengeful and materialistic does not bear out this interpretation.

== Performance history ==
The opera's first, ornate production, costing 150,000 francs, was conducted by François Habeneck. The performances of the soprano Cornélie Falcon in the title role and the dramatic tenor Adolphe Nourrit as Eléazar were particularly noted. Nourrit had significant influence on the opera: Eléazar, originally conceived as a bass part, was rewritten for him, and it appears that it was largely his idea to end act 4 not with a traditional ensemble, but with the aria "Rachel, quand du seigneur" for which he may also have suggested the text. The production was notable for its lavishness, including the on-stage organ in Act I, the enormous supporting cast, and the unprecedentedly elaborate decor. Two teams of scenic artists took responsibility over the stage decorations, Charles Séchan, Léon Feuchère, Jules Diéterle and Édouard Desplechin designing Acts I, II, IV and V, and René-Humanité Philastre and Charles-Antoine Cambon providing the materials for Act III.

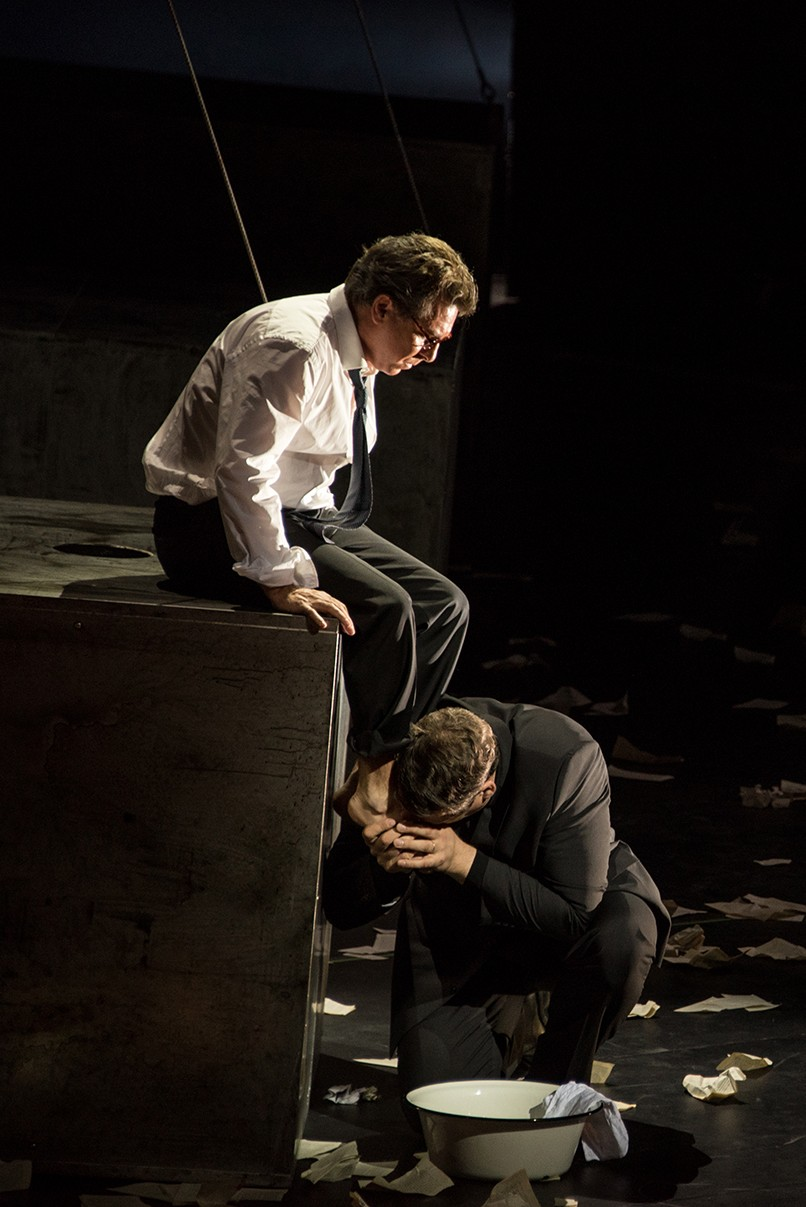
Cardinal washing the feet of Éléazar, Bavarian State Opera 2016, director: Calixto Bieito

La Juive enjoyed an international success comparable to that of Meyerbeer's popular grand operas. It made its American premiere at the Théâtre d'Orléans on 13 February 1844. The work was also used for the inaugural performance at the newly constructed Palais Garnier in Paris on 5 January 1875 (the title role was sung by Gabrielle Krauss; the scenery was recreated after the original designs by Jean-Baptiste Lavastre and Édouard Desplechin, Chéret, Charles-Antoine Cambon, and Auguste Alfred Rubé and Philippe Chaperon). La Juive received its first performance at the Metropolitan Opera in New York on 16 January 1885 with Amalie Materna as Rachel.

Richard Wagner, who admired La Juive, may have borrowed from it the Act I organ effect, for his 1868 opera Die Meistersinger von Nürnberg. Moreover, Eléazar's tapping at his goldsmith's work is echoed by Hans Sachs's cobbling during Die Meistersinger.

Having last been performed at the Metropolitan Opera in 1890 with Lilli Lehmann as Rachel, La Juive was revived in 1919 as a vehicle for the Met's star tenor, Enrico Caruso. Eléazar was the last role Caruso added to his repertoire, as well as the last he ever sang in performance, on 24 December 1920. After Caruso's death in August, 1921, Giovanni Martinelli succeeded him in the role at the Met. Both Martinelli and Caruso made best-selling recordings of the opera's most popular aria, "Rachel! Quand du seigneur".

After the 1919 revival with Caruso, the Metropolitan Opera programmed La Juive semi-regularly until 1936, when it was dropped from the repertory, not to be heard at the Met again for 67 years. The opera fell out of favor in Europe around the same time and has rarely been performed since. American tenor Richard Tucker greatly admired La Juive and lobbied for a Met revival with himself as Eléazar. Tucker first sang the role in concert performances in London in 1964. In 1973, he twice appeared in the opera with the New Orleans Opera Association and gave two heavily cut concert performances of the opera, again in London. Tucker also persuaded RCA Red Seal to issue a complete recording of La Juive, though eventually, RCA would consent only to finance a single record of the opera's highlights. Tucker finally convinced the Met's general manager, Schuyler Chapin, to mount a new production of La Juive, to be performed during the 1975–76 season; however, Tucker died unexpectedly in January 1975 and the Met's revival of La Juive died with him. In 2003, the opera was finally heard again at the Metropolitan with tenor Neil Shicoff as Eléazar. Other modern revivals have been staged at the Vienna State Opera (1999), La Fenice in Venice (2005), the Paris Opera (2007), the Zurich Opera House (2007), the Staatstheater Stuttgart (2008), De Nederlandse Opera in Amsterdam (2009), the Tel Aviv (Israel) Opera and the Mikhailovsky Theatre at Saint Petersburg (both 2010) and the Göteborg Opera (2014). The Bavarian State Opera presented a new production by Calixto Bieito with Roberto Alagna and Aleksandra Kurzak in 2016. A new production was mounted at the Staatsoper Hannover in 2019. Oper Frankfurt produces the opera in 2024, staged by Tatjana Gürbaca and conducted by Henrik Nánási.

== Roles ==
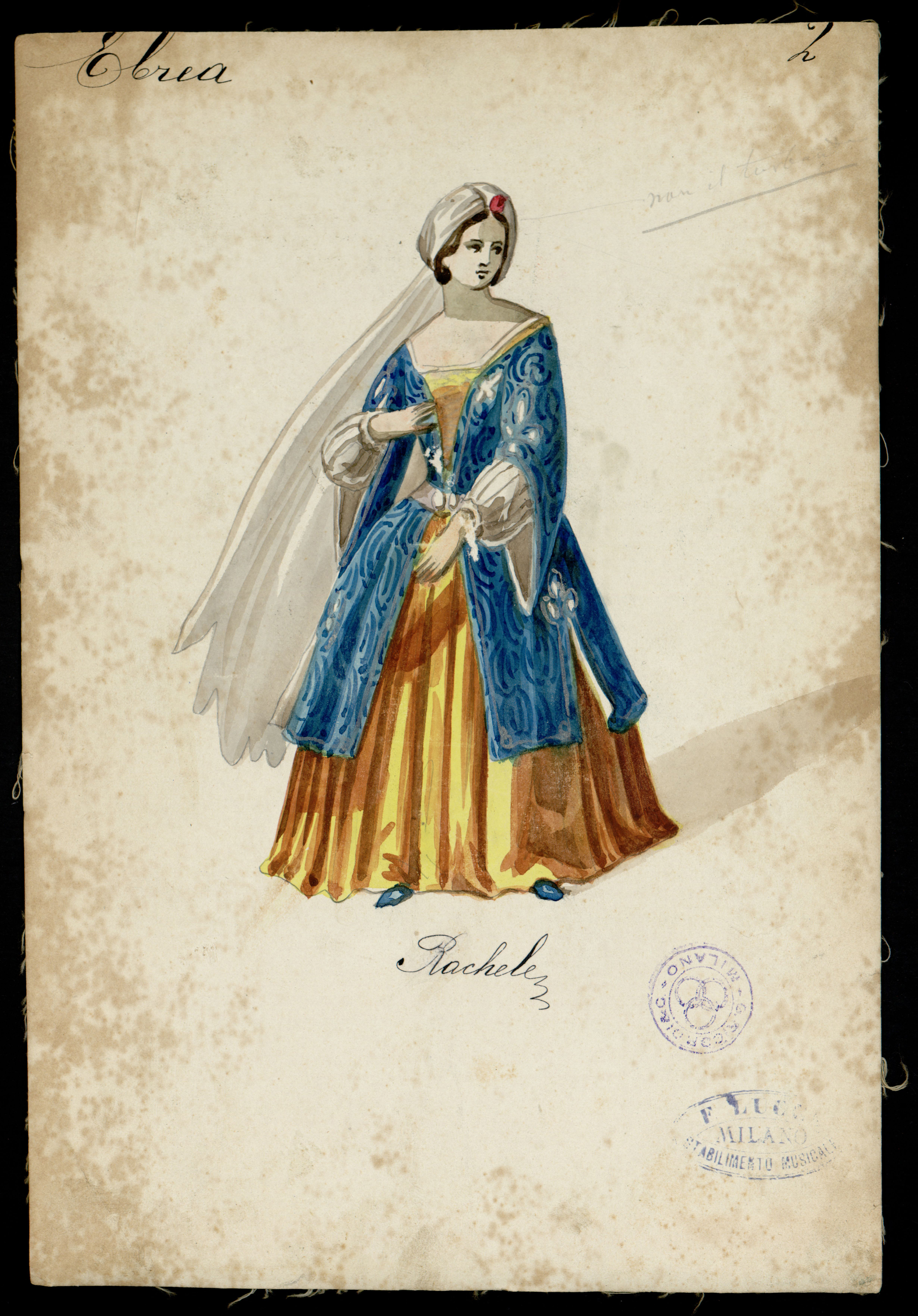
Rachele, costume design for L'ebrea, Italian version of the opera, 1865

Role	Voice type	Premiere Cast, 23 February 1835 (Conductor: François Habeneck)
Eléazar, a Jewish goldsmith	tenor	Adolphe Nourrit
Rachel, his adopted daughter, the "Jewess" of the title, who is in fact not	soprano	Cornélie Falcon
Prince Léopold	tenor	Marcelin Lafont
Princess Eudoxie, niece of the emperor	soprano	Julie Dorus-Gras
Gian Francesco, Cardinal de Brogni, President of the Council	bass	Nicolas Levasseur
Ruggiero, city provost	baritone	Henri-Bernard Dabadie
Albert, a sergeant	bass	Alexandre Prévost
A herald	baritone	Prosper Dérivis
Officer of the emperor	baritone	Alexandre Prévost
First man of the people	bass	Ferdinand Prévôt
Second man of the people	tenor	Jean-Étienne-Auguste Massol
Third man of the people	tenor	Alexis Dupont
Member of the Holy Office	bass	Charles-Louis Pouilley
Majordomo	baritone	François-Alphonse Hens
Emperor Sigismund	Silent	

== Synopsis ==
The synopsis below reflects the original version of the opera. Modern performing versions often somewhat adapt this storyline for convenience.

Place: Constance
Time: 1414

Events before the opera begins

The following is a summary of events which took place before the first act of the opera, some of which are only revealed in the course of the action.

When he was young, the Jew Eléazar had lived in Italy near Rome and witnessed the condemnation and executions of his sons as heretics by Count Brogni. Eléazar himself was banished and forced to flee to Switzerland.

During his journey, Eléazar found a baby near death, abandoned inside a burnt-out house which turned out to be the home of the Count. Bandits had set fire to the house, attempting to kill the entire family of Brogni but unaware that the Count himself was in Rome at the time.

Eléazar took the child, a girl, and raised her as his own daughter, naming her Rachel. Brogni discovered the ruins of his house and the bodies of his family upon his return. He subsequently became a priest and later a cardinal.

At the beginning of the opera, in 1414 Rachel (now a young woman) is living with her adopted father in the city of Constance. The forces of the Holy Roman Emperor Sigismund have defeated the Hussites, in battles where Prince Leopold has distinguished himself. The Council of Constance, convened by Antipope John XXIII, has been arranged to resolve Church matters. John XXIII is represented there by Cardinal Brogni, who was a historical personage. His part in the story of the opera is, however, entirely fictional.

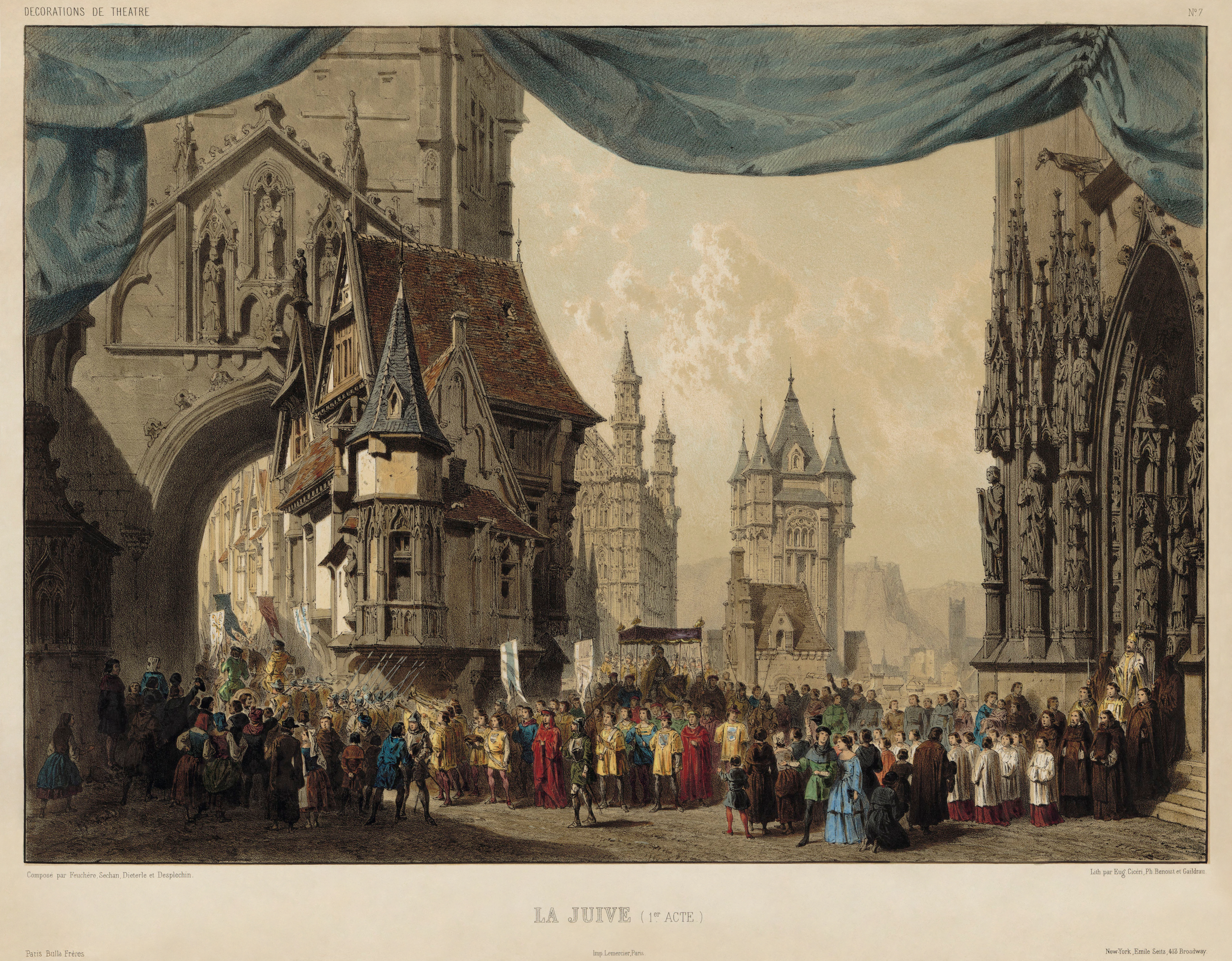
Act 1 of the original 1835 production, design by Charles Séchan, Léon Feuchère, Jules Dieterle, and Édouard Desplechin

=== Act 1 ===
A square in the city of Constance in 1414

Eléazar is a goldsmith. The crowd condemns him for working during a day dedicated to Church festivities. He is saved from a lynching by the arrival of Brogni, who in the process recognises Eléazar as his old adversary.

Prince Léopold arrives in disguise as a young Jewish artist Samuel. Rachel is in love with Samuel and knows nothing of his true identity. Local laws reflect prejudice against the Jews: if a Jew and a Christian have sexual relations, the Christian is excommunicated and the Jew is killed. Léopold is thus taking a great risk in this affair, especially as he is already married to the Princess Eudoxie. The crowd returns to attack Eléazar, but 'Samuel' secretly instructs his troops to calm things down. The act closes with a grand triumphal procession.

=== Act 2 ===
Inside the house of Éléazar

Rachel has invited 'Samuel' for the Passover celebration in Eléazar's house. He is present while Eléazar and the other Jews sing their Passover prayers. Rachel becomes anxious when she notices that 'Samuel' refuses to eat the piece of unleavened bread that she has given him. He reveals to her that he is a Christian, without telling her his true identity. Rachel is horrified and reminds him of the terrible consequences of such a relationship.

Princess Eudoxie enters to order from Eléazar a valuable jewel as a present for her husband, at which point Samuel (Prince Léopold) hides.

After Eudoxie leaves, Léopold promises to take Rachel away with him. She tries to resist, worrying about abandoning her father, but as she is about to succumb to his advances, they are confronted by Eléazar, who curses Léopold before the latter runs off.

=== Act 3 ===
Magnificent gardens

Rachel, who has followed 'Samuel' to the Palace, offers her services as a lady's maid to Princess Eudoxie. Eléazar arrives at the palace to deliver the jewel. He and Rachel recognise Léopold as 'Samuel'. Rachel declares before the assembly that Léopold seduced her and she, Eléazar and Léopold are arrested and placed in prison, on the instructions of Cardinal Brogni.

=== Act 4 ===
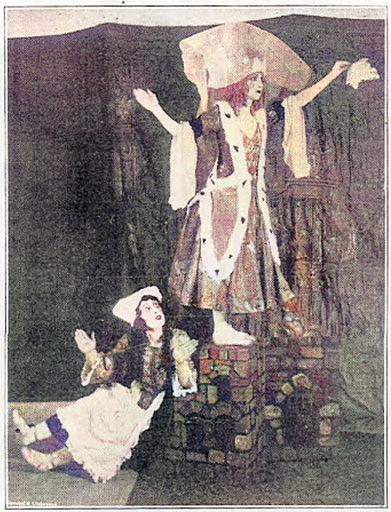
Helene Samuels performing in The Jewess, published in The Sentinel (Chicago, Illinois), 15 January 1926 page 16 (Colorized)

A Gothic interior

Princess Eudoxie asks to see Rachel in prison, and persuades her to withdraw her allegations. Rachel agrees; Cardinal Brogni agrees to commute Léopold's sentence, and to spare Rachel and Eléazar if they convert. Eléazar at first answers that he would rather die, but then makes plans to avenge himself. He reminds the Cardinal of the fire in his house near Rome many years before and tells the Cardinal that his infant daughter did not die. He says that she was saved by a Jew and that only he knows who he is. If he dies, his secret will die with him. Cardinal Brogni begs him to tell him where his daughter is, but in vain. Eléazar sings of the vengeance that he will have in dying, but he suddenly remembers that he will be responsible for the death of Rachel. The only way to save her is to admit that the Cardinal is her father and that she is not Jewish but Christian. The act ends with the opera's most famous aria, Eléazar's 'Rachel, quand du Seigneur'. He does not want to sacrifice Rachel to his hatred of Christians, and renounces his revenge. However, when he hears the cries from a pogrom in the streets, he decides that God wants him to bear witness in death with his daughter to the God of Israel.

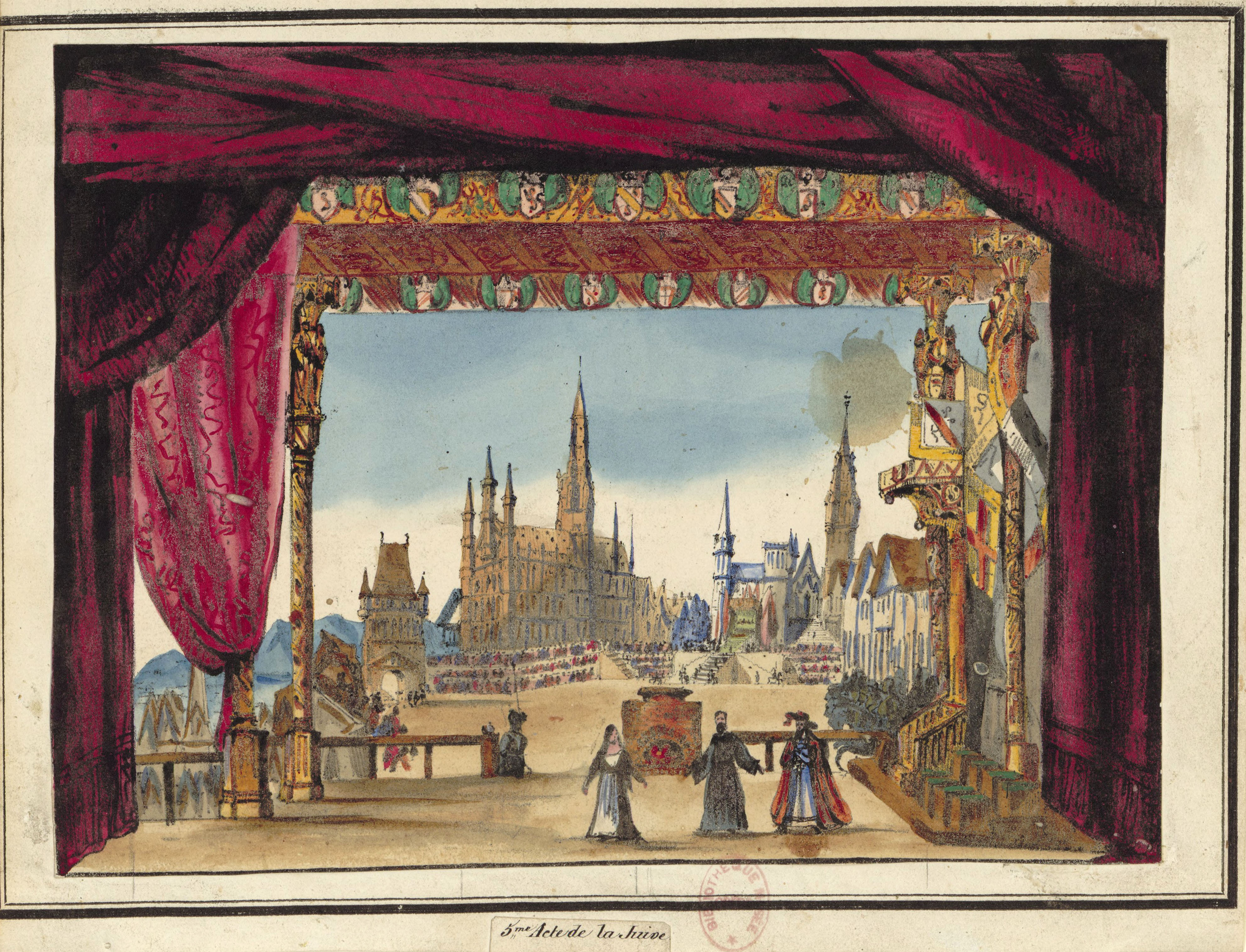
Design for Act 5 of the original 1835 production

=== Act 5 ===
A large tent supported by Gothic columns

Eléazar and Rachel are brought to the gallows where they will be thrown into a cauldron of boiling water. Rachel is terrified. Eléazar explains that she can be saved if she converts to Christianity. She refuses and climbs to the gallows before him. As the people are singing various prayers, Cardinal Brogni asks Eléazar if his own daughter is still alive. Eléazar says that she is and when Cardinal Brogni asks where she can be found, Eléazar points to the cauldron, saying "There she is!" He then climbs to his own death while the Cardinal falls on his knees. The opera ends with a chorus of monks, soldiers and the people singing "It is done and we are avenged on the Jews!"

== Recordings ==
- 1973 – Richard Tucker (Eléazar), Yasuko Hayashi (Rachel), Michèle Le Bris (Eudoxie), Juan Sabate (Léopold), David Gwynne (Brogni) – live concert performance, London, cond. Anton Guadagno – Opera d'Oro CD: OPD-1333.
- 1974 (Highlights) – Richard Tucker (Eléazar), Martina Arroyo (Rachel), Anna Moffo (Eudoxie), Juan Sabate (Léopold), Bonaldo Giaiotti (Brogni) – Ambrosian Opera Chorus, New Philharmonia Orchestra, cond. Antonio de Almeida – RCA Red Seal LP: ARL1-0447 CD: 886446206530
- 1989 – José Carreras (Eléazar), Júlia Várady (Rachel), June Anderson (Eudoxie), Dalmacio Gonzalez (Léopold), Ferruccio Furlanetto (Brogni) – Ambrosian Opera Chorus, Philharmonia Orchestra, cond. Antonio de Almeida – Philips CD: 420 190–2.
- 2003 – Neil Shicoff (Eléazar), Soile Isokoski (Rachel), Regina Schörg (Eudoxie), Zoran Todorovic (Léopold), Alastair Miles (Brogni) – Chor und Orchester der Wiener Staatsoper, Cond. Simone Young – RCA Red Seal CD: 74321795962
- 2003 – Neil Shicoff (Eléazar), Krassimira Stoyanova (Rachel), Simina Ivan (Eudoxie), Jianyi Zhang (Léopold), Walter Fink (Cardinal Brogni) – Chor und Orchester der Wiener Staatsoper, cond. Vjekoslav Šutej – Deutsche Grammophon DVD: 00440 073 4001
- The opera's best known aria, "Rachel! Quand du seigneur", has been recorded by numerous renowned tenors, including Enrico Caruso, Giovanni Martinelli, Beniamino Gigli, Placido Domingo, Jonas Kaufmann and Léon Escalaïs.

== Appropriations ==
Rachel, the Jewish prostitute in Marcel Proust's In Search of Lost Time, is nicknamed by the narrator "Rachel quand du Seigneur". As Halévy's Rachel is both Jewish and Christian, so Proust's Rachel is both sexual commodity and, in the eyes of her lover Robert de Saint-Loup, an idolised lady of great price.
