= Coppélia =

Comic ballet composed by Léo Delibes

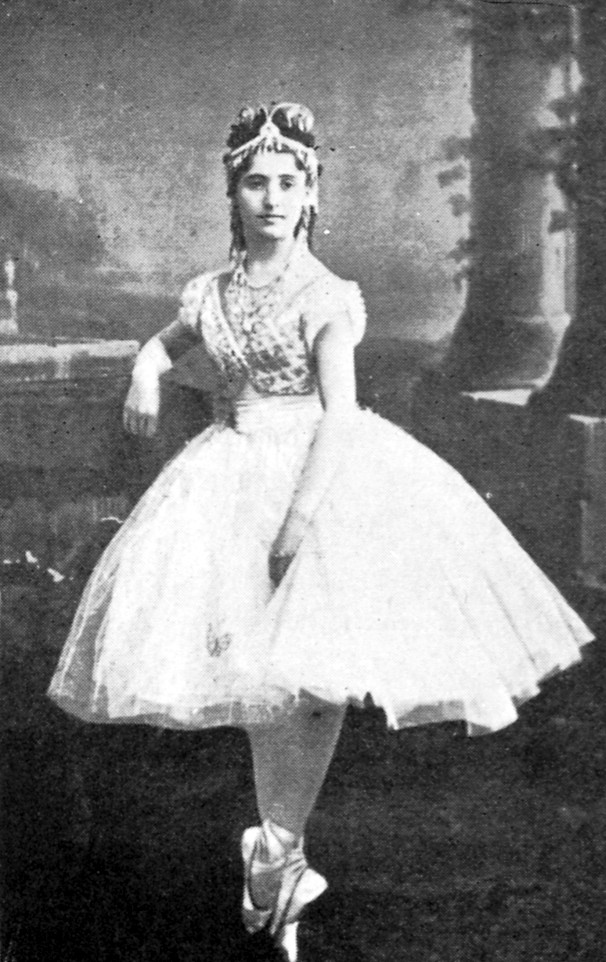
- Giuseppina Bozzacchi as Swanhilda in the Saint-Léon/Delibes Coppélia. Paris, 1870
- Choreographer: Arthur Saint-Léon
- Music: Léo Delibes
- Based on: Der Sandmann by E. T. A. Hoffmann
- Premiere: 25 May 1870; Théâtre Impérial l'Opéra, Paris
- Characters: Doctor Coppélius; Swanhilda; Franz
- Genre: Romantic
- Type: Comic ballet

Coppélia (sometimes subtitled: La Fille aux Yeux d'Émail (The Girl with the Enamel Eyes)) is a comic ballet from 1870 originally choreographed by Arthur Saint-Léon to the music of Léo Delibes, with libretto by Charles-Louis-Étienne Nuitter. Nuitter's libretto and mise-en-scène was based upon E. T. A. Hoffmann's short story Der Sandmann (The Sandman). In Greek, κοπέλα (or κοπελιά in some dialects) means young woman. Coppélia premiered on 25 May 1870 at the Théâtre Impérial de l'Opéra, with the 16-year-old Giuseppina Bozzacchi in the principal role of Swanhilda and ballerina Eugénie Fiocre playing the part of Franz en travesti. The costumes were designed by Paul Lormier and Alfred Albert, the scenery by Charles-Antoine Cambon (Act I, scene 1; Act II, scene 1), and Édouard Desplechin and Jean-Baptiste Lavastre (Act I, scene 2).

The ballet's first flush of success was interrupted by the Franco-Prussian War and the siege of Paris (which also led to the early death of Giuseppina Bozzacchi, on her 17th birthday), but eventually it became the most-performed ballet at the Opéra.

Modern-day productions are traditionally derived from the revivals staged by Marius Petipa for the Imperial Ballet of St. Petersburg in the late 19th century. Petipa's choreography was documented in the Stepanov method of choreographic notation at the turn of the 20th century. These notations were later used to stage the St. Petersburg version for such companies as the Vic-Wells Ballet (precursor of today's Royal Ballet).

== Plot ==
Dr. Coppélius is a doctor who has made a life-size dancing doll. It is so lifelike that Franz, a village youth, becomes infatuated with it and sets aside his heart's true desire, Swanhilda. She shows him his folly by dressing as the doll, pretending to make it come to life and ultimately saving him from an untimely end at the hands of the inventor.

Act I

The story begins during a town festival to celebrate the arrival of a new bell. The town crier announces that, when it arrives, anyone who becomes married will be awarded a special gift of money. Swanhilda and Franz plan to marry during the festival. However, Swanhilda becomes unhappy with Franz because he seems to be paying more attention to a girl named Coppélia, who sits motionless on the balcony of a nearby house. The house belongs to a mysterious and faintly diabolical inventor, Doctor Coppélius. Although Coppélia spends all of her time sitting motionless and reading, Franz is mesmerized by her beauty and is determined to attract her attention. Still upset with Franz, Swanhilda shakes an ear of wheat to her head: if it rattles, then she will know that Franz loves her. Upon doing this, however, she hears nothing. When she shakes it by Franz's head, he also hears nothing; but then he tells her that it rattles. However, she does not believe him and runs away heartbroken.

Later on, Dr. Coppelius leaves his house and is heckled by a group of boys. After shooing them away, he continues on without realizing that he dropped his keys in the melée. Swanhilda finds the keys, which gives her the idea of learning more about Coppélia. She and her friends decide to enter Dr. Coppelius' house. Meanwhile, Franz develops his own plan to meet Coppélia, climbing a ladder to her balcony.

Act II

Swanhilda and her friends find themselves in a large room filled with people. However, the occupants aren't moving. The girls discover that, rather than people, these are life-size mechanical dolls. They quickly wind them up and watch them move. Swanhilda also finds Coppélia behind a curtain and discovers that she, too, is a doll.

Dr. Coppelius returns home to find the girls. He becomes angry with them, not only for trespassing but for also disturbing his workroom. He kicks them out and begins cleaning up the mess. However, upon noticing Franz at the window, Coppélius invites him in. The inventor wants to bring Coppélia to life but, to do that, he needs a human sacrifice. With a magic spell, he will take Franz's spirit and transfer it to Coppélia. After Dr. Coppelius proffers him some wine laced with sleeping powder, Franz begins to fall asleep. The inventor then readies his magic spell.

However, Dr. Coppelius did not expel all the girls: Swanhilda is still there, hidden behind a curtain. She dresses up in Coppélia's clothes and pretends that the doll has come to life. She wakes Franz and then winds up all the mechanical dolls to aid their escape. Dr. Coppelius becomes confused and then saddened when he finds a lifeless Coppélia behind the curtain.

Act III

Swanhilda and Franz are about to make their wedding vows when the angry Dr. Coppelius appears, claiming damages. Dismayed at having caused such an upset, Swanhilda offers Dr. Coppelius her dowry in return for his forgiveness. However, Franz tells Swanhilda to keep her dowry and offers to pay Dr. Coppelius instead. At that point, the mayor intervenes and gives Dr. Coppelius a bag of money, which placates him. Swanhilda and Franz are married and the entire town celebrates by dancing.

(Note: In some Russian versions of the ballet, after getting caught, Swanhilda confesses to Dr. Coppelius about what she and her friends did and her situation with Franz. Coppelius decides to forgive Swanhilda and teach her how to act like a doll coming to life to fool Franz, thus ending Act 2 on a happier note.)

== Influence and background ==
Doctor Coppelius is not unlike Hoffmann's sinister Herr Drosselmeyer in The Nutcracker or the macabre Svengali-like travelling magician of the same name in Offenbach's The Tales of Hoffmann.

The part of Franz was danced en travesti by Eugénie Fiocre, a convention that pleased the male members of the Jockey-Club de Paris and was retained in Paris until after World War II.

The festive wedding-day divertissements in the village square that occupy Act III are often deleted in modern danced versions.

Some influence on this story comes from travelling shows of the late 18th and early 19th centuries starring mechanical automata.

== Alternative versions ==
=== Opera Variant ===
A variation of the Coppélia story is contained in Jacques Offenbach's opera, The Tales of Hoffmann, a fictional work about the same Hoffmann who wrote the story that inspired Coppélia. The opera consists of a prologue, three fantastic tales in which Hoffmann is a participant, and an epilogue. In the first story, based on Der Sandmann, Hoffmann falls in love with a mechanical doll, Olympia, but in this case, the story has a melancholy tinge as the doll was destroyed by Dr. Coppelius, who share the same name as Coppelius who wants Coppélia to come to life, after he didn't get a check from Spalanzani for Olympia's eyes.

=== San Francisco Ballet ===
In 1939, San Francisco Ballet produced a version of Coppélia choreographed by Willam Christensen which was the first American complete version of the ballet. It starred Willam Christensen as Franz, Earl Riggins as Dr. Coppelius, and Janet Reed as Swanhilda and was an instant hit.

=== Balanchine ===
In 1974, George Balanchine choreographed a version of Coppélia for the New York City Ballet. He was assisted by Alexandra Danilova, who had performed the title role many times during her dancing career. She staged the Petipa choreography for Act II. Balanchine created new choreography for Act III and for the mazurka, czardas and Franz's variation in Act I. Patricia McBride danced the role of Swanhilda the friendliest girl; Helgi Tomasson danced the role of Franz; Shaun O'Brian portrayed Dr. Coppélius. In Act III, Balanchine added 24 young girls to dance and be in the scene during Waltz of the Hours, Dawn (L'aurore), Prayer, and Work (Le travail) variations.

=== Second Life - LPBA ===
From 2011 the Little Princess Ballet Academy (LPBA) has performed Coppélia on the virtual platform Second Life. The adaptation follows the original in three acts, but the mime parts are problematic to perform in Second Life and has been changed, together with some changes in the sequences. All parts are played by individual avatars.

=== Louisville Ballet ===
In 2015, the Louisville Ballet produced a version of Coppélia, choreographed by Robert Curran, that is set in Louisville's Germantown neighborhood in 1917, just months after the United States has entered World War I. In this version, Franz and a handful of other enlistees stationed at Camp Taylor all plan to marry their fiancées the next day, right before they depart for Europe.

=== Monte Carlo Ballet Company - Coppel-I-A ===
In 2019 Jean-Christophe Maillot created a modernized version of Coppélia for the Les Ballets de Monte-Carlo, calling it Coppél-i-A. In it, Coppelia is an android with artificial intelligence. The original music was rewritten by Maillot's brother Bertrand Maillot to suit the dystopian theme.

=== Coppelia - feature film ===
A family feature film, Coppelia, was released in 2021, directed and written by Jeff Tudor, Steven De Beul and Ben Tesseur. The film has no dialogue and mixes live action dance with animation. It was inspired by choreographer Ted Brandsen's 2008 production created for Dutch National Ballet. In Brandsen's production, and in the film, Doctor Coppelius is updated from toymaker to cosmetic surgeon and Coppelia is a robot. The movie deals with issues such as the pressures of social media, the lure of superficial beauty and the importance of being yourself. The film stars ballerina, author and activist Michaela DePrince, Daniel Camargo, Vito Mazzeo, Darcey Bussell, Irek Mukahmedov, Sasha Mukahmedov, Jan Kooijman, Igone de Jongh and artists of Dutch National Ballet. Composer Maurizio Malagnini wrote the original score. The movie premiered at Annecy Festival 2021 and won the Golden Punt for Best Fiction Feature at the 40th Cambridge Film Festival.

== Ballet ==
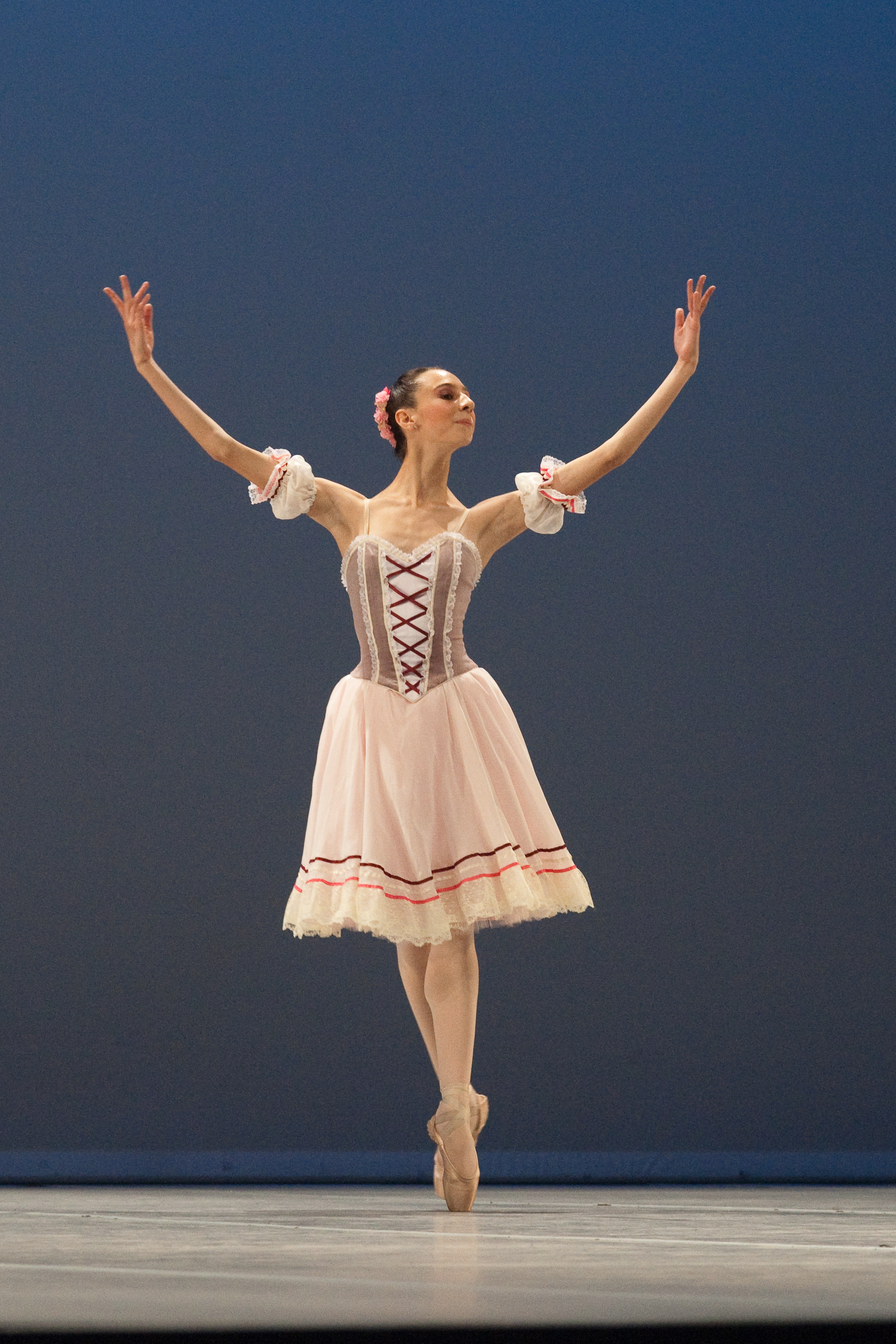
Coppélia, 2010

Below is the résumé of scenes and dances taken from the theatre program of the St. Petersburg Imperial Ballet. It is the Imperial Ballet's production as staged by Marius Petipa that serves as the basis for all modern-day productions.

Act I

- no. 01 Prélude et Mazurka
- no. 02 Valse et jalousie
- no. 03 Scène
- no. 04 Mazurka
- no. 05 Scène
- no. 06 Ballade de l'Épi
- no. 07 Thème slave varié
- no. 08 Csárdás
- no. 09 Finale

Act II

- no. 10 Introduction et scène
- no. 11 Jeux avec les automates
- no. 12 Scène à boire: Franz et Dr. Coppélius
- no. 13 Scène et valse de la Poupée
- no. 14 L'espièglerie de Swanhilde
- no. 15 Boléro: Danse espagnol
- no. 16 Gigue: Danse écossaise
- no. 17 Scène finale

Act III

- no. 18 Marche de la cloche

La Fête de la cloche

- no. 19 Valse des heures
- no. 20 Variation: "L'aurore"
- no. 21 Variation: "La prière"
- no. 22 "Le travail—La fileuse"
- no. 23 "L'hymen—Noce villageoise"
- no. 24 "La discorde et la guerre"

Grand Pas de deux -

  - no. 25 Grand adage: "La paix"
  - supplement - Variation pour le début de Léontine Beaugrand (music: Léo Delibes; 1872)
  - supplement - Variation: "Danse du marié" (music: Ernest Guiraud, from the ballet Gretna Green)
  - supplement - Variation Mlle. Dionesiia Potapenko: "Travail", 1904 (music: Léo Delibes, from the ballet Sylvia)
  - no. 26 Variation: "Danse de Fête"
  - no. 27 Finale: Galop générale

== Scoring ==
Harp	Strings

Woodwinds

2 flutes

(2nd doubling on piccolo)

2 oboes

(2nd doubling on English horn)

2 clarinets
2 bassoons

Brass

4 horns
2 valved cornets
2 trumpets
3 trombones
tuba

Percussion (2 players)

Timpani
triangle
cymbals
drum
bass drum with cymbals
glockenspiel
