= Eugénie Fiocre =

French ballet dancer (1845–1908)

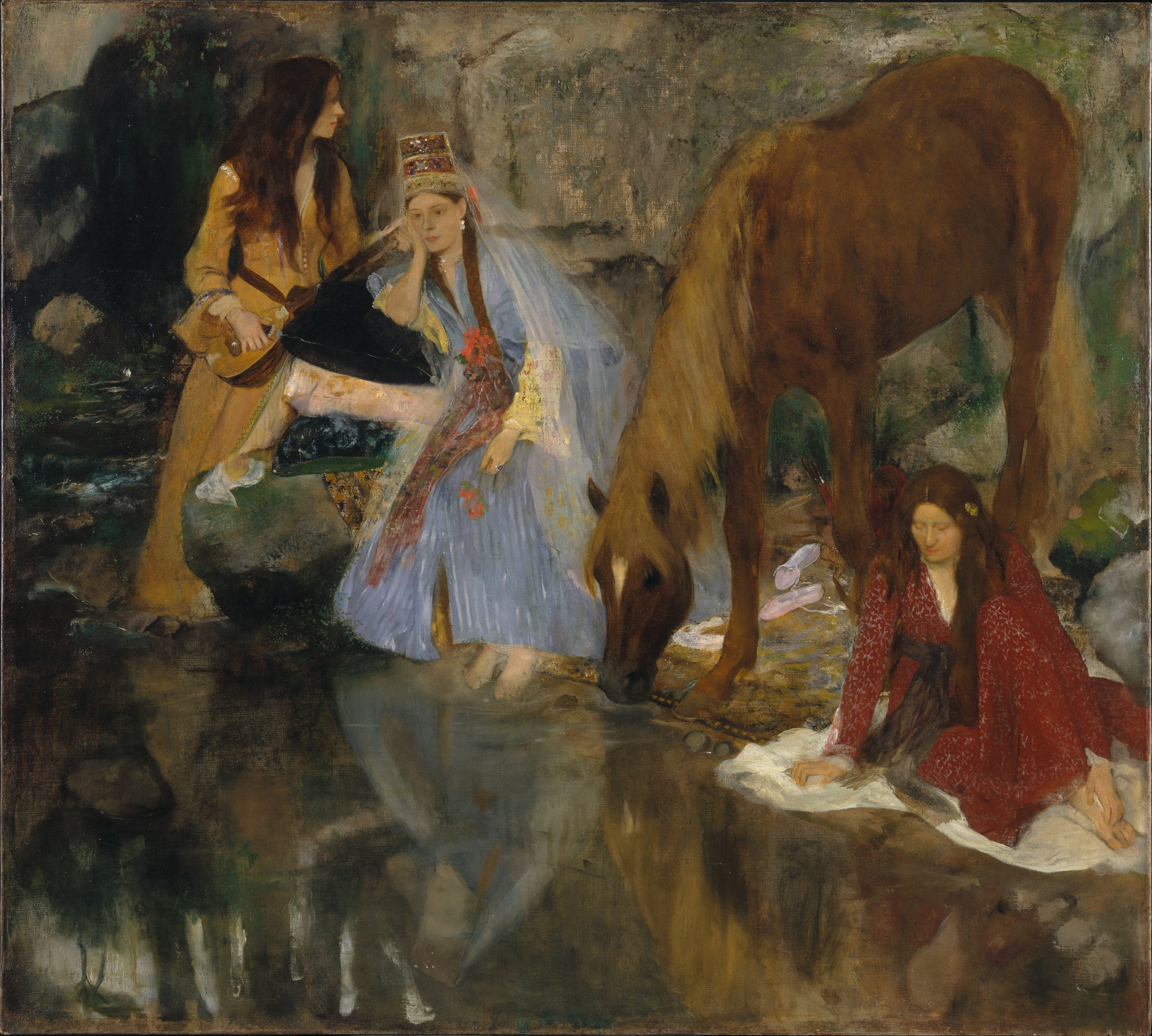
Edgar Degas (French, 1834-1917). Portrait of Mlle Fiocre in the Ballet "La Source", ca. 1867-1868. Oil on canvas -Brooklyn Museum

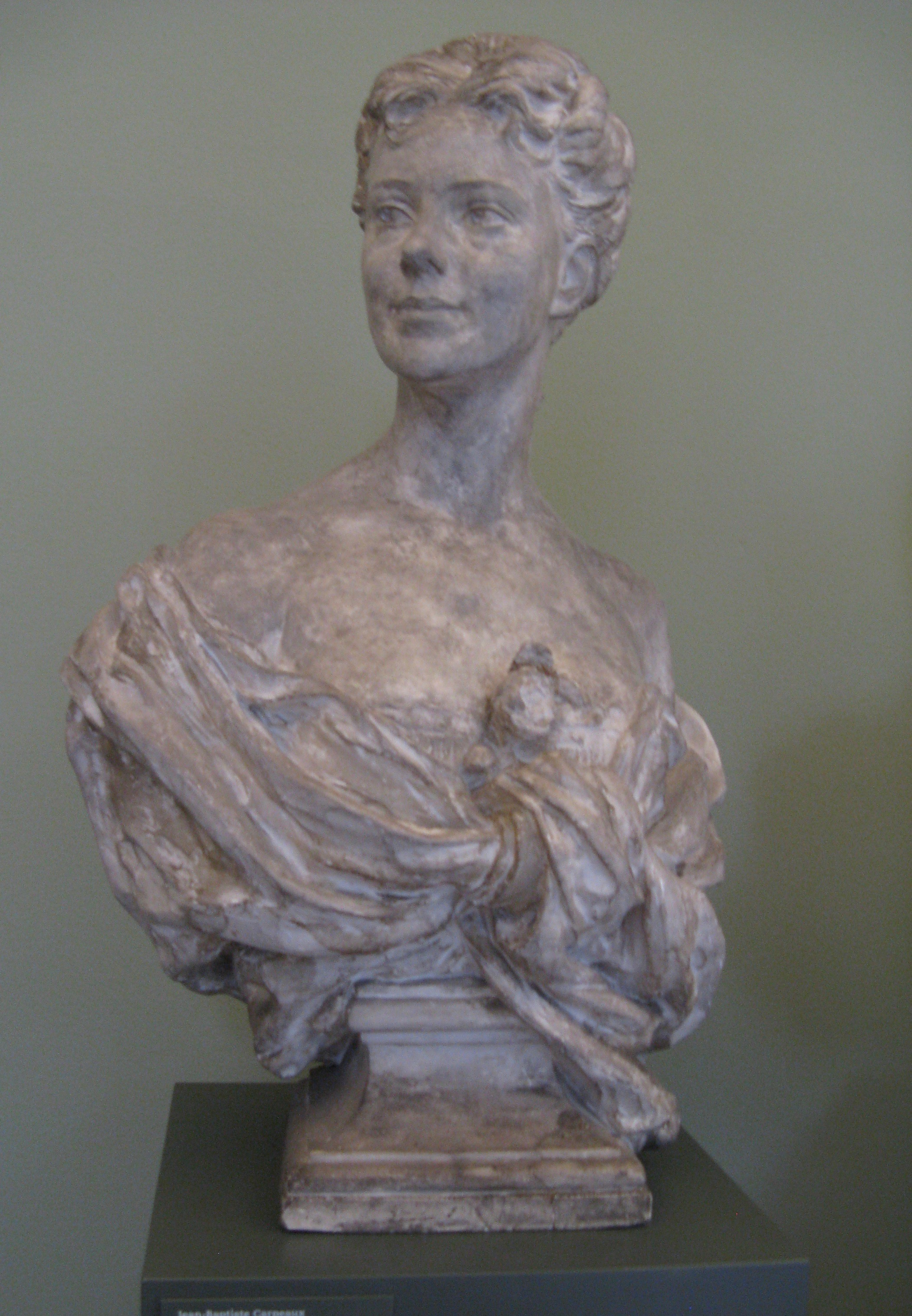
Bust of Eugénie Fiocre by Jean-Baptiste Carpeaux at Ny Carlsberg Glyptotek

Eugénie Fiocre (b. Paris, 2 July 1845, d. 1908) was a principal dancer at the Paris Opéra 1864–75 where she often danced en travesti, creating Frantz in Coppélia in 1870, and, renowned for her beauty, was sculpted by Jean-Baptiste Carpeaux and painted by Degas in a scene from Saint-Léon's ballet La Source. She was married to Stanislas Le Compasseur de Créqui-Montfort Marquis de Courtivron and mother of explorer, anthropologist, diplomat and Olympian Georges de Crequi-Montfort.
