= Travesti (theatre) =

Portrayal of a stage character by a performer of the opposite sex

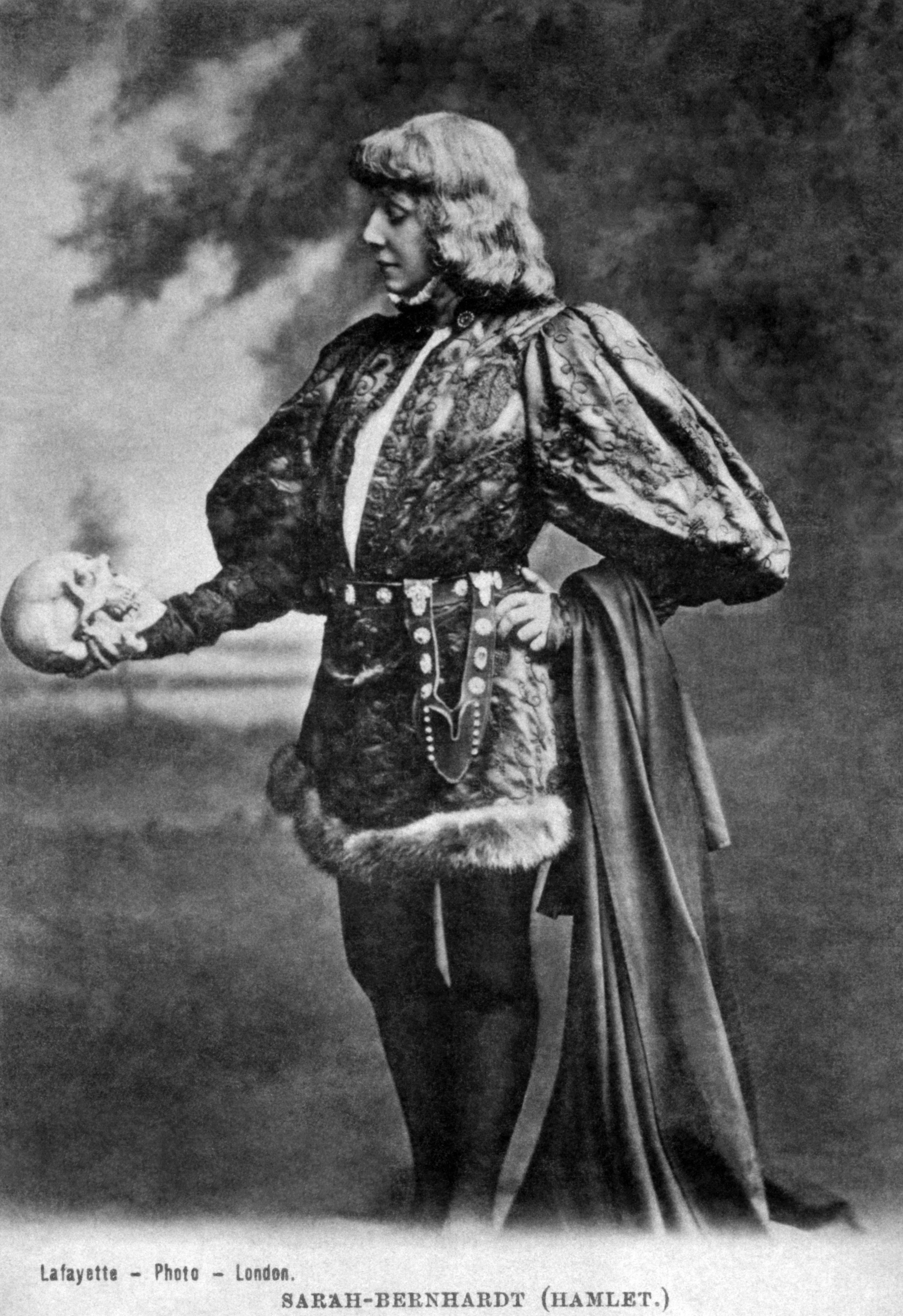
Sarah Bernhardt as Hamlet

Travesti is a theatrical character in an opera, play, or ballet performed by a performer of the opposite sex.

For social reasons, female roles were played by boys or men in many early forms of theatre, and travesti roles continued to be used in several types of context even after actresses became accepted on the stage. The popular British theatrical form of the pantomime traditionally contains a role for a "principal boy" — a breeches role played by a young woman — and also one or more pantomime dames, female comic roles played by men. Similarly, in the formerly popular genre of Victorian burlesque, there were usually one or more breeches roles.

== Etymology ==
The word means "disguised" in French. Depending on sources, the term may be given as travesty, travesti, or en travesti. The Oxford Essential Dictionary of Foreign Terms in English explains the origin of the latter term as "pseudo-French", although French sources from the mid-19th century have used the term, e.g. Bibliothèque musicale du Théâtre de l'opéra (1876), La revue des deux mondes (1868), a dictionary (1843), and have continued the practice into the 21st century.

== Men in female roles ==
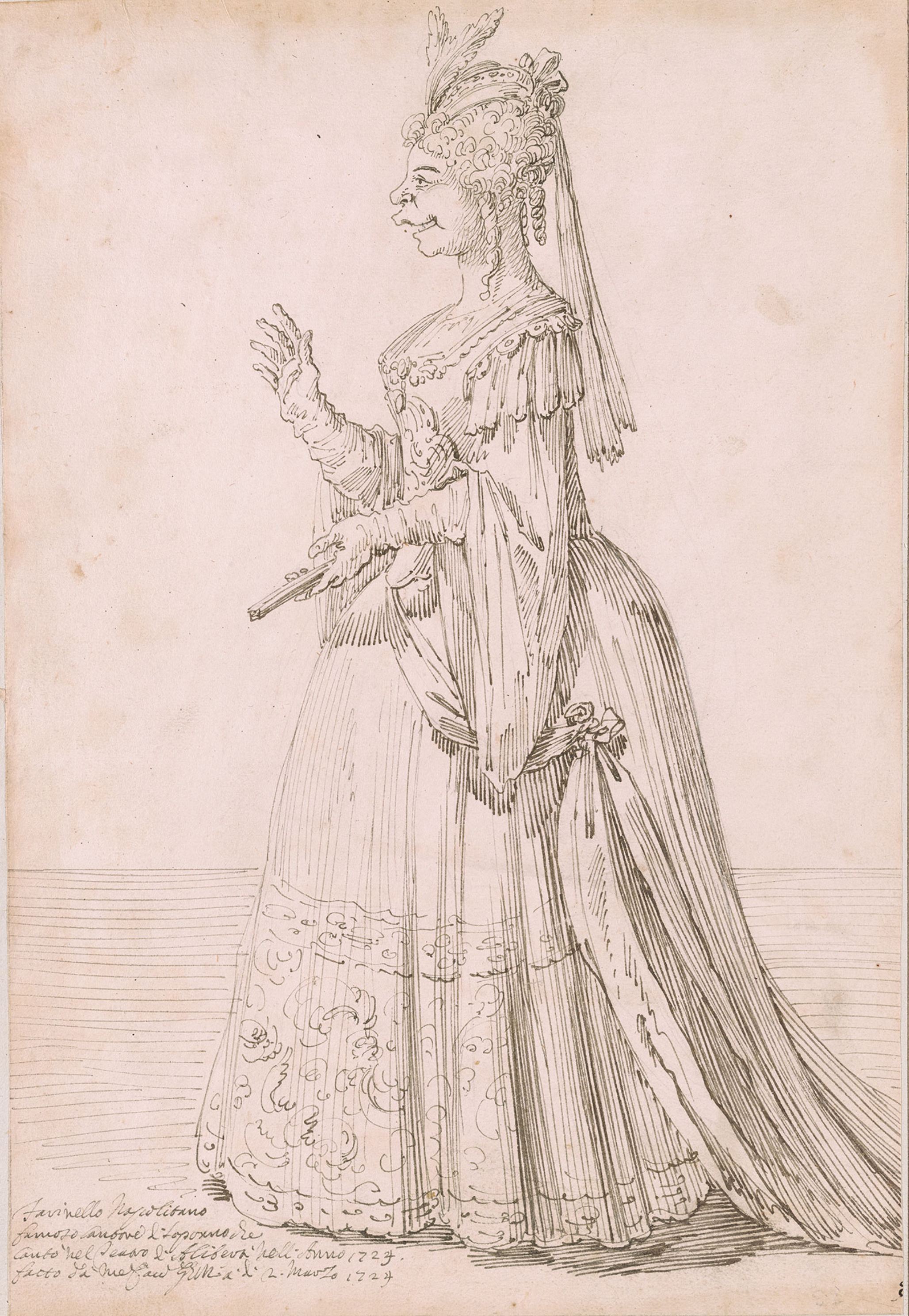
The famous castrato Farinelli caricatured in one of his female roles

Until the late 17th century in England and the late 18th century in the Papal States—although not elsewhere in Europe—women were conventionally portrayed by male actors (usually adolescents) in female attire because the presence of actual women on stage was considered immoral.

=== In theatre ===
As a boy player, Alexander Cooke is thought to have created many of Shakespeare's principal female roles, as well as Agrippina in Ben Jonson's Sejanus His Fall. With the Restoration of the monarchy in 1660, women began to appear on the English stage, although some female roles continued to be played by boys and young men, including romantic leads. Edward Kynaston, whose roles included the title role in Ben Jonson's Epicoene and Evadne in Beaumont and Fletcher's The Maid's Tragedy, was one of the last of the era's boy players.

London's Shakespeare's Globe theatre, a modern reconstruction of the original Globe Theatre, continues the practice of casting men in female Shakespearean roles. Toby Cockerell played Katherine of France in the theatre's opening production of Henry V in 1997, while Mark Rylance played Cleopatra in the 1999 production of Antony and Cleopatra.

Travesti roles for men are still to be found in British pantomime, where there is at least one humorous (and usually older) female character traditionally played by a male actor, the pantomime dame.

=== In opera ===
Castrati, adult males with a female singing voice (usually produced by castration before puberty), appeared in the earliest operas – initially in female roles. In the first performance of Monteverdi's Orfeo in 1607 the roles of Eurydice and Proserpina were both sung by castrati. However, by 1680 the castrati had become the predominant singers for leading male roles as well. The use of castrati for both male and female roles was particularly strong in the Papal States, where women were forbidden from public stage performances until the end of the 18th century.

An exception to this practice was in 17th- and 18th-century French opera where it was traditional to use uncastrated male voices both for the hero and for malevolent female divinities and spirits. In Lully's 1686 opera Armide the hero (Renaud) was sung by an haute-contre (a type of high tenor voice) while the female spirit of hatred (La Haine) was sung by a tenor. In Rameau's 1733 Hippolyte et Aricie, the hero (Hippolyte) was sung by an haute-contre, while the roles of the three Fates and Tisiphone were scored for basses and tenors. The remaining female roles in both operas were sung by women. The title role of the vain but ugly marsh nymph in Rameau's Platée is also for an haute-contre.

Female roles in opera sung by men can still be found, although they are not common. The three market women in Jacques Offenbach's 1858 opera Mesdames de la Halle are played by tenors. The role of the witch in Humperdinck's 1890 opera Hänsel und Gretel was originally written for a mezzo-soprano, but was sung by the tenor Philip Langridge in the Metropolitan Opera's 2009 production directed by Richard Jones. In the premiere performance of Péter Eötvös Tri sestry (1998), all female roles were sung by men, with the title roles of the three sisters performed by countertenors. Azio Corghi's 2005 opera Il dissoluto assolto, which incorporates story elements from Mozart's Don Giovanni, casts a countertenor in the role of the mannequin of Donna Elvira.

=== In dance ===
The portrayal of women by male dancers was very common in Renaissance court ballet and has continued into more modern times, although primarily restricted to comic or malevolent female characters. The use of male dancers for all the female roles in a ballet persisted well into the 18th century in the Papal States, when women dancers had long been taking these roles elsewhere in Italy. Abbé Jérôme Richard who travelled to Rome in 1762 wrote: "Female Dancers are not permitted on the stages in Rome. They substitute for them boys dressed as women and there is also a police ordinance that decreed they wear black bloomers." Another French traveller that year, Joseph-Thomas, comte d'Espinchal, asked himself: "What impression can one have of ballet in which the prima ballerina is a young man in disguise with artificial feminine curves?"

In the original production of The Sleeping Beauty in 1890, a male dancer, Enrico Cecchetti, created the role of the evil fairy Carabosse, although the role has subsequently been danced by both men and women.

In Frederick Ashton's 1948 choreography of Cinderella, Robert Helpmann and Ashton himself danced the roles of the two stepsisters. Ben Stevenson later continued the practice of casting male dancers as the stepsisters in his own choreography of the ballet. Other female ballet characters traditionally performed by male dancers are Old Madge, the village sorceress in La Sylphide and the Widow Simone in La fille mal gardée.

== Women in male roles ==
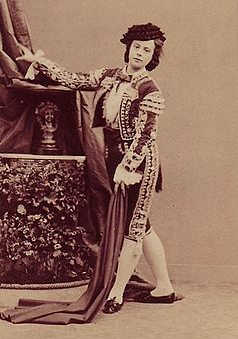
The ballerina Eugénie Fiocre as a matador, c. 1860

With the Restoration of Charles II in 1660 women started appearing on the English stage, both in the female roles that in Shakespeare's day had been portrayed by men and boys, and in male roles. It has been estimated that of the 375 plays produced in London between 1660 and 1700, nearly a quarter contained one or more roles for actresses dressed as men.

Amongst the 19th-century actresses who made a mark in travesti roles were Mary Anne Keeley, who portrayed Smike in the stage adaptation of Nicholas Nickleby and the robber Jack Sheppard in Buckstone's play based on his life; Maude Adams, who played Peter Pan in the American premiere of Barrie's play and went on to play the role over 1,500 times; and Sarah Bernhardt, who created the role of Napoleon II of France in Edmond Rostand's L'Aiglon and once played the title role in Hamlet.

In the Victorian era, musical burlesques generally included several breeches roles. According to the Grove Dictionary of Music and Musicians, although "an almost indispensable element of burlesque was the display of attractive women dressed in tights, often in travesty roles ... the plays themselves did not normally tend to indecency." One of the specialists in these roles was Nellie Farren who created the title roles in numerous burlesques and pantomimes, including Robert the Devil, Little Jack Sheppard and Ruy Blas and the Blasé Roué. In British pantomime, which is still regularly performed, the young male protagonist or Principal boy is traditionally played by an actress in boy's clothes.

The practice of women performing en travesti in operas became increasingly common in the early 19th century as castrato singers went out of fashion and were replaced by mezzo-sopranos or contraltos in the young masculine roles. For example, the title role of Rossini's 1813 Tancredi was specifically written for a female singer. However, from the late 17th century onwards, the roles of young male lovers and heroes had often been entrusted, as an alternative to castrati, to sopranos or contraltos in travesti. An extreme case was the very character of Don Giovanni being performed by soprano Rosa Cardini in Eustachio Bambini's La pravità castigata, staged in Brno in 1734. And many a female singer specialized, albeit usually not exclusively, in performing breeches roles, including contraltos Vittoria Tesi, Maria Maddalena Pieri (e.g. in the title role in Vivaldi's Farnace) and Lucia Lancetti (e.g. in the title role in Vivaldi's Orlando Furioso), or sopranos Margherita Durastanti and Margherita Chimenti.

Further, travesti mezzo-sopranos had been used by both Handel and Mozart, to portray a boy or very young man, such as Sesto in Giulio Cesare and Cherubino in The Marriage of Figaro. In 20th-century opera (and beyond), composers continued to use women to sing the roles of young men, when they felt the mature tenor voice sounded wrong for the part. One notable example was Richard Strauss, who used a mezzo-soprano for Octavian in Der Rosenkavalier and the Composer in Ariadne auf Naxos. As recently as May 2025, in his opera Il nome della rosa, staged at La Scala in Milan, Francesco Filidei entrusted the role of young Benedictine novice Adso da Melk to mezzo-soprano Kate Lindsey, even though the part of papal inquisitor Bernardo Gui was also sung by another mezzo-soprano, Daniela Barcellona.

From 1830 to 1850, female ballet dancers were increasingly seen in the corps de ballet portraying matadors, hussars, and cavaliers, and even as the prima ballerina's 'leading man', a practice which was to last well into the 20th century in France. Although both Fanny Elssler and her sister Thérèse danced travesti roles at the Paris Opera, Thérèse, who was very tall by the standards of the day, danced them more frequently, often partnering Fanny as her leading man. The French ballerina Eugénie Fiocre, who created the role of Franz in Coppélia, was particularly known for her travesti performances.

== Gallery ==
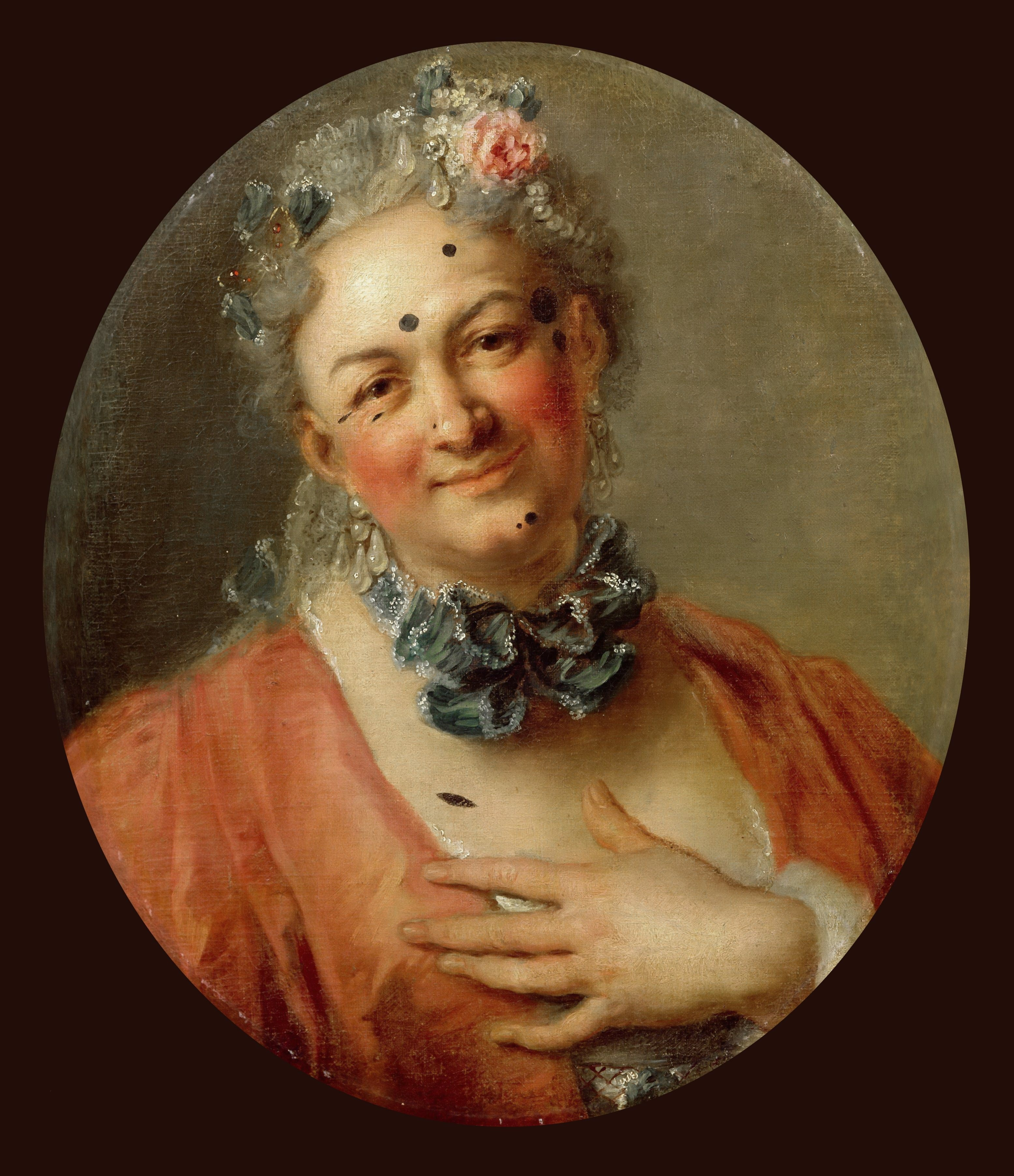
Pierre Jélyotte as the nymph Plataea in Rameau's opera Platée

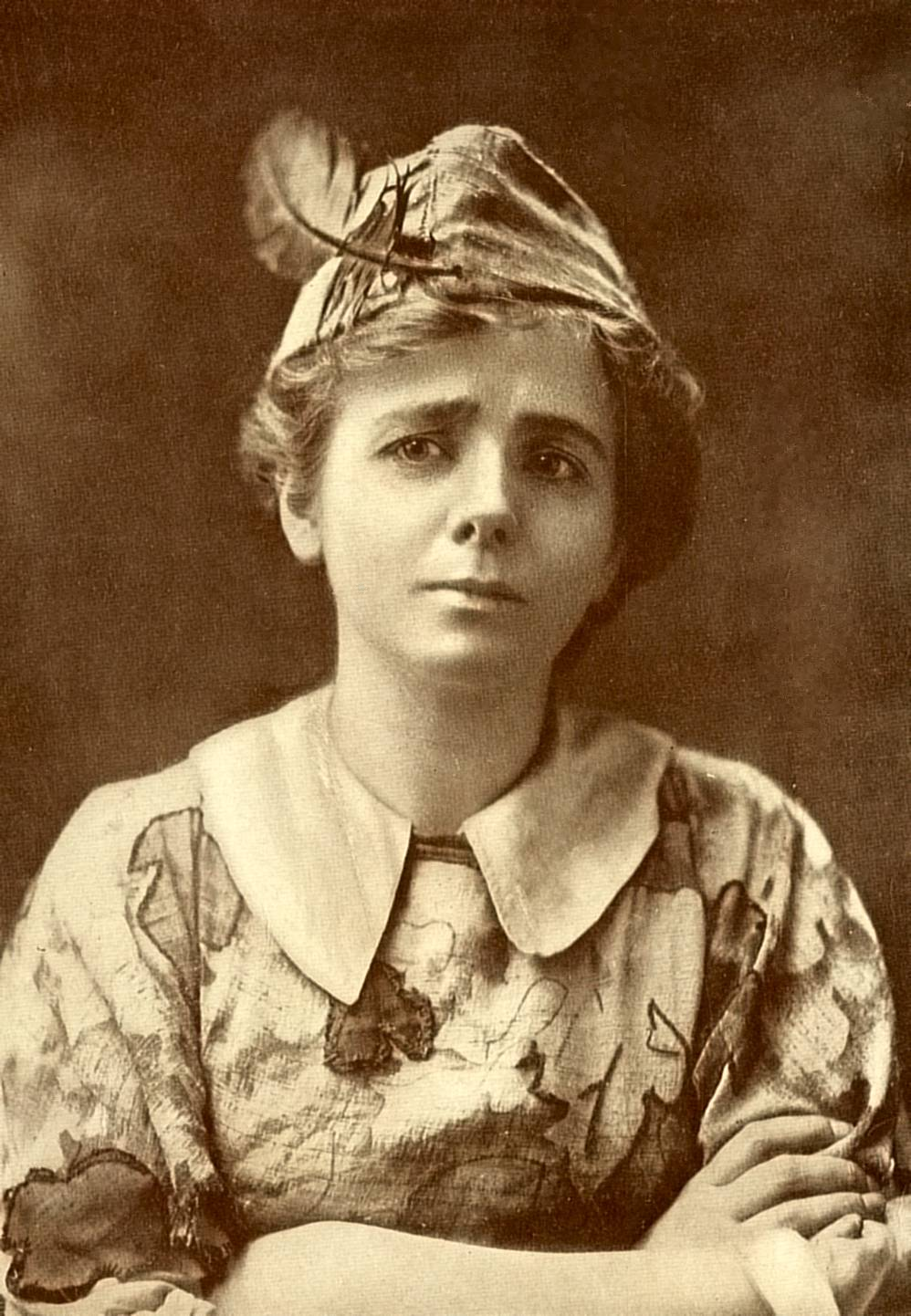
Maude Adams as Peter Pan

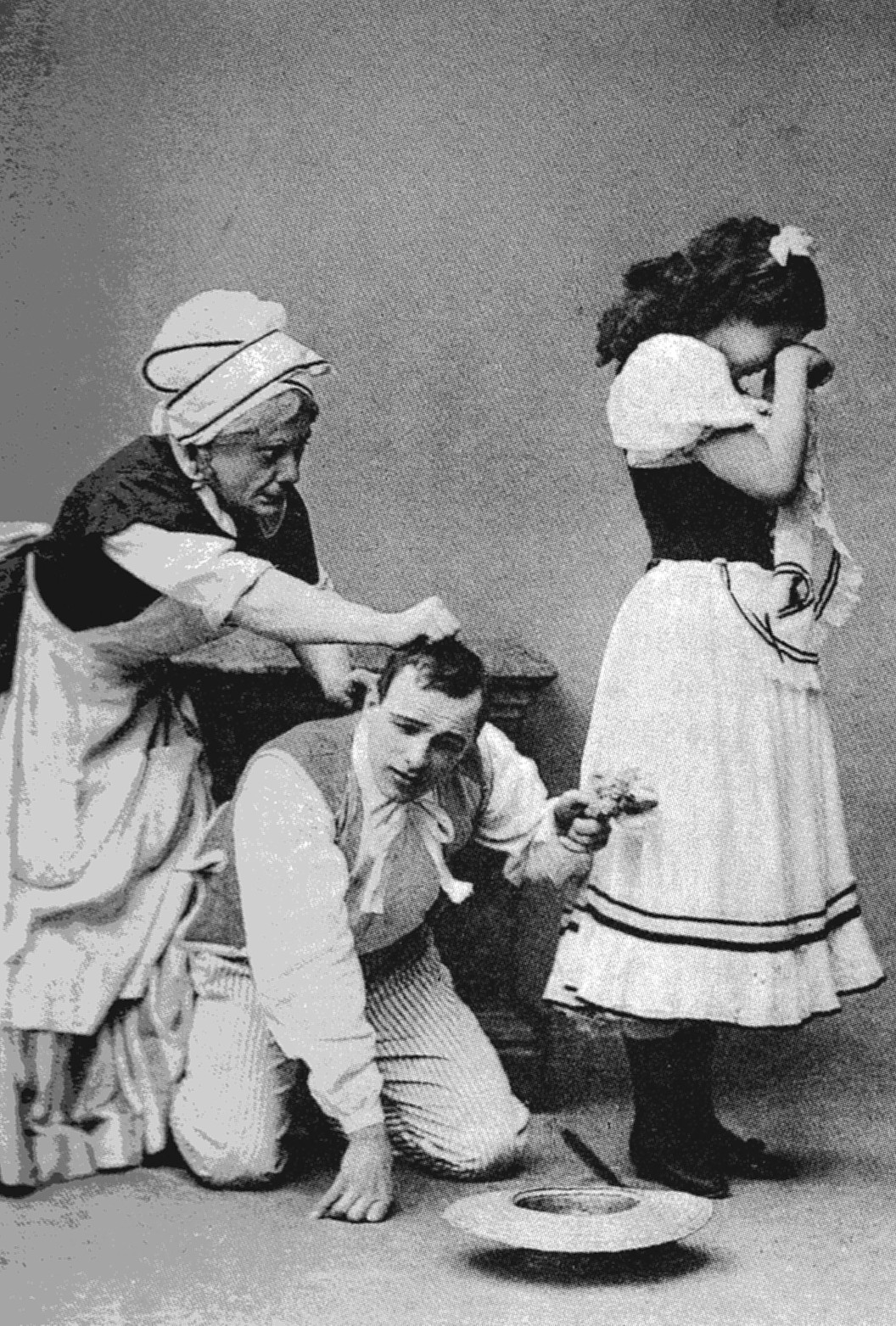
Grigory Riabtzev (left) as Widow Simone in La Fille Mal Gardée

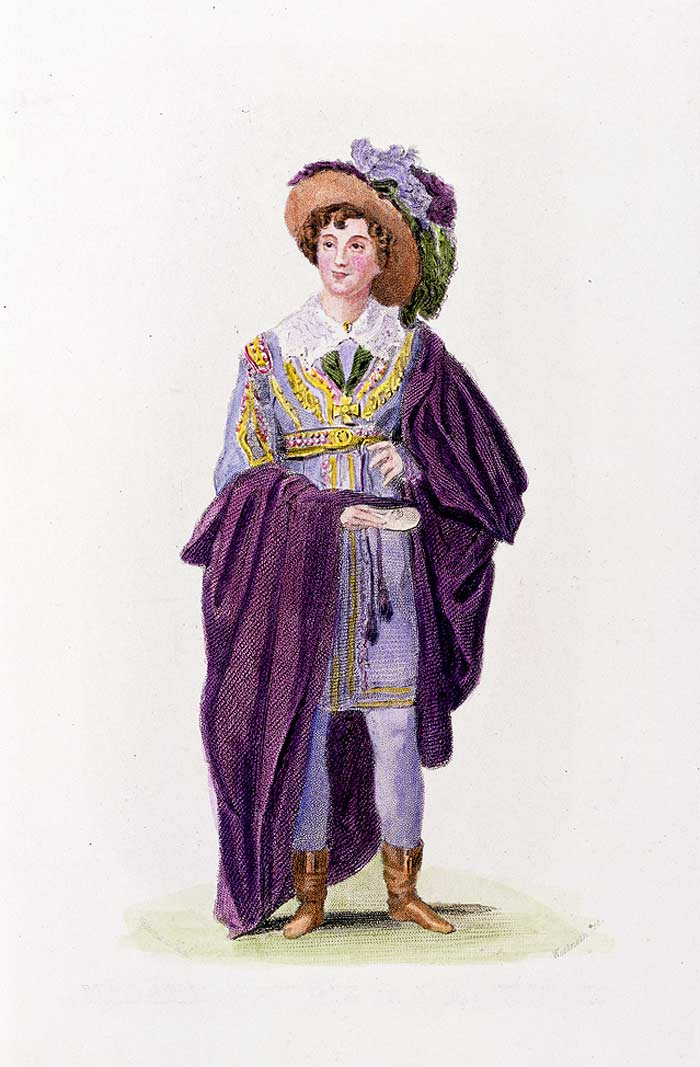
Eliza Vestris as Felix in Isaac Nathan's comic opera The Alcaid or The Secrets of Office

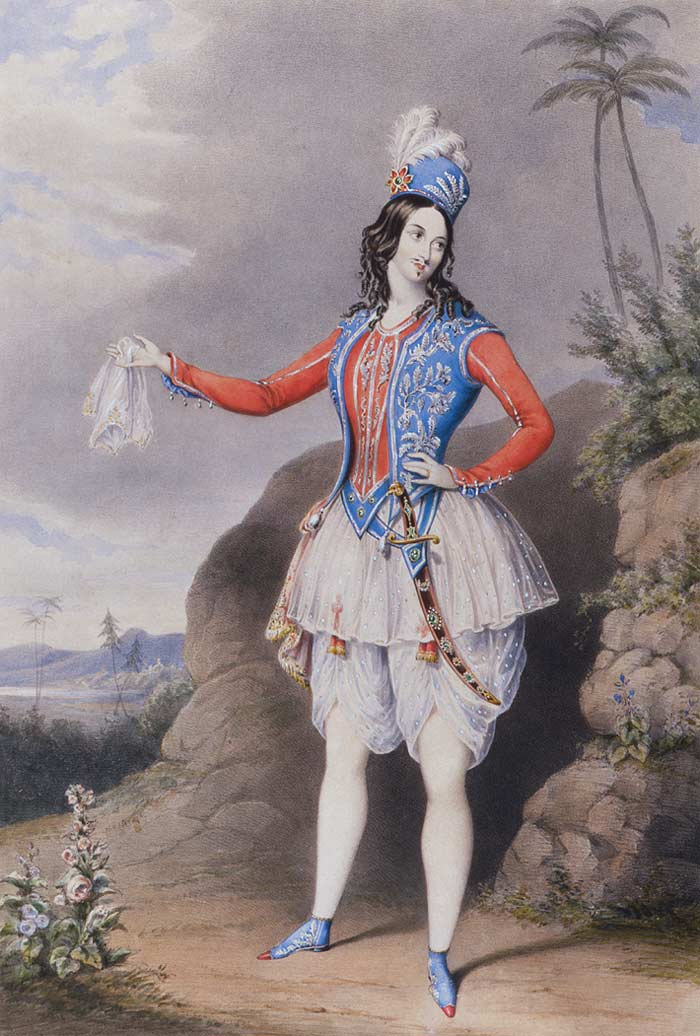
Sarah Louisa Fairbrother as Abdullah in Open Sesame

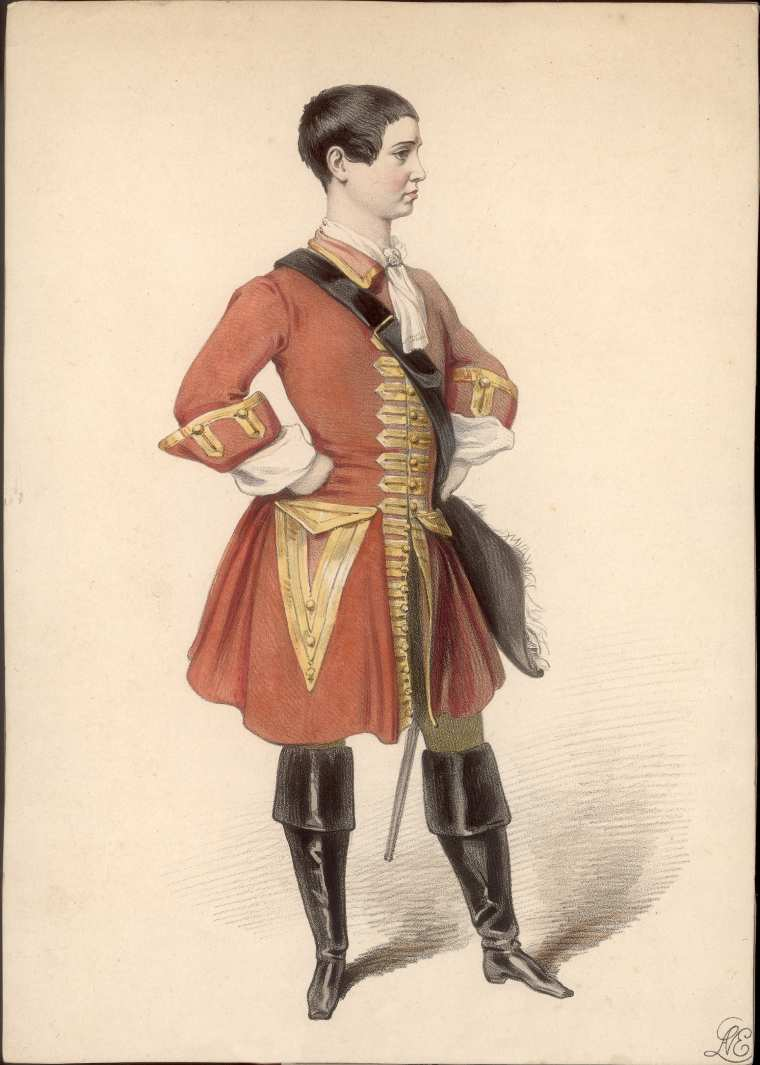
Mary Anne Keeley in one of her male roles

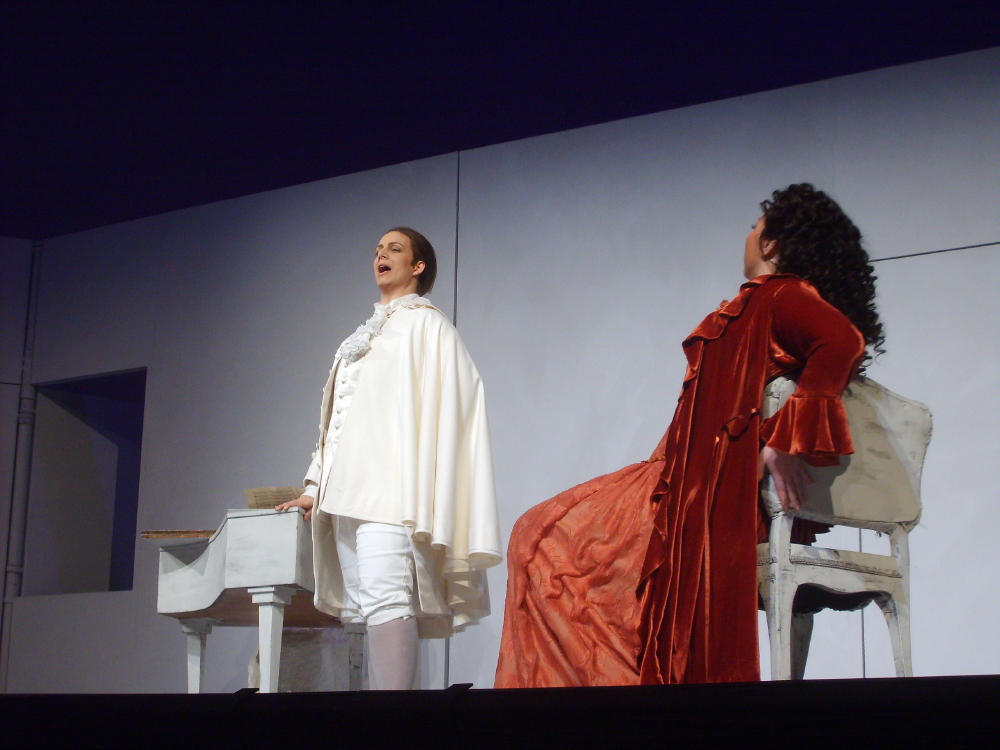
Joslyn Rechter as Cherubino in Mozart's opera The Marriage of Figaro

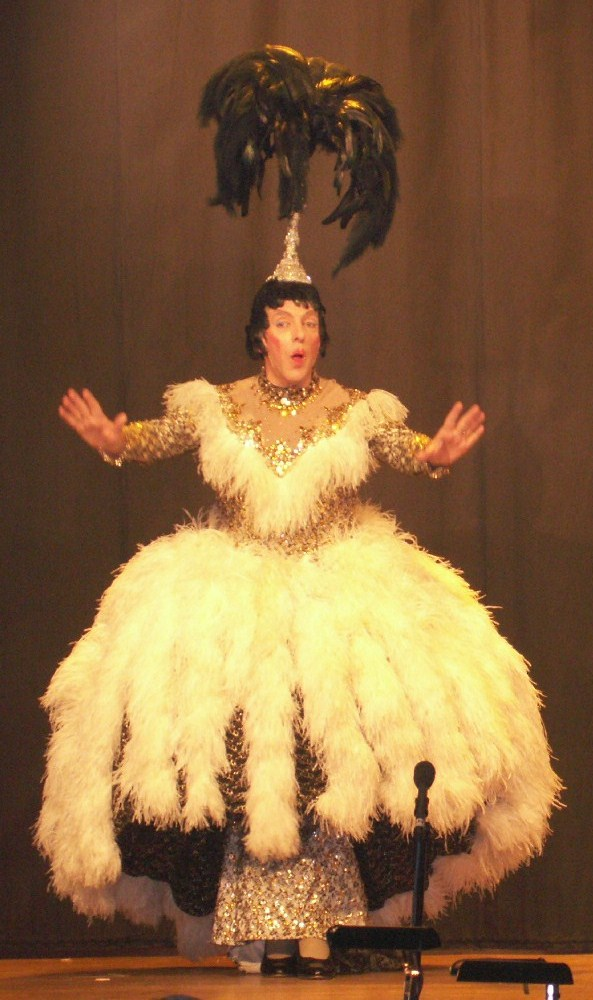
Euan McIver as a pantomime dame

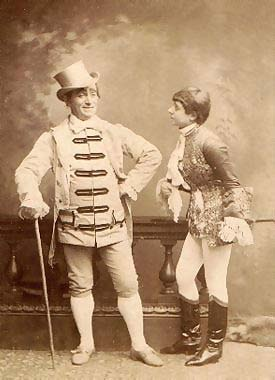
Nellie Farren as Jack (with David James as Blueskin) in Little Jack Sheppard

== See also ==
- Cross-dressing in music and opera
- Cross-dressing in film and television
- Cross-gender acting
- Commedia dell'arte (a theatrical form where female roles were played by men from as early as the 1560s)
- Cross-dressing
- Drag show
- Köçek
- Onnagata (male actors who play female roles in Japanese kabuki theatre)
- Stage Beauty a film about the advent of women in Restoration era theater, threatening the career of Edward Kynaston, one of the last English boy players.
- Takarazuka Revue (a Japanese musical theatre troupe in which all roles are played by women)
- Womanless wedding

== Works cited ==
- Anderson, Jack (1992). Ballet & Modern Dance: A concise history, 2nd edition. Princeton Book Co. ISBN 0-87127-172-9
- Bibliothèque musicale du Théâtre de l'opéra, Volume 2 (1876). Librairie des bibliophiles. (in French)
- Blackmer, Corinne E. and Smith, Patricia Juliana (eds) (1995), En Travesti: Women, Gender Subversion, Opera, Columbia University Press. ISBN 0-231-10269-0
- Brillarelli, Livia (1995). Cecchetti A Ballet Dynasty. Toronto: Dance Collection Danse Educational Publications.
- Budden, Julian (1992). "Travesty". In Stanley Sadie (ed.). The New Grove Dictionary of Opera. London. ISBN 0-333-73432-7.
- Coste, Martine Agathe (2004). La folie sur scène: Paris 1900/1968 . Editions Publibook. ISBN 2-7483-0365-2 (in French)
- Duron, Jean (ed.) (2008). Cadmus et Hermione (1673). Editions Mardaga. ISBN 2-87009-984-3 (in French)
- Foster, Susan Leigh (1998). Choreography & Narrative: Ballet's staging of story and desire. Indiana University Press. ISBN 0-253-21216-2
- Gallo, Denise (2006). Trouser Roles in Opera, Study Guide: The Siege of Corinth, Baltimore Opera.
- Garafola, Lynn (1985), "The Travesty Dancer in Nineteenth-Century Ballet" in Dance Research Journal, Vol. 17, No. 2 (Autumn, 1985), pp. 35–40. (Also reprinted in Ann Dils and Ann Cooper Albright (eds) Moving History / Dancing Cultures: A Dance History Reader, Wesleyan University Press, 2001, pp. 210–216. ISBN 978-0-8195-6413-9)
- Gottlieb, Robert (2010). Sarah: The Life of Sarah Bernhardt. New Haven, Conn.: Yale University Press. ISBN 978-0-300-19259-9. OCLC 813393485.
- Halliday, F. E. (1964). A Shakespeare Companion 1564-1964, Baltimore, Penguin
- Harbin, Billy J., Marra, Kim and Schanke, Robert A. (2005). The Gay & Lesbian Theatrical Legacy, University of Michigan Press. ISBN 0-472-09858-6
- Harris-Warrick, Rebecca (2005). The grotesque dancer on the eighteenth-century stage: Gennaro Magri and his world. Univiversity of Wisconsin Press. ISBN 0-299-20354-9
- Howe, Elizabeth (1992). The First English Actresses: Women and Drama 1660–1700, Cambridge University Press.
- Kennedy, Michael (2006), The Oxford Dictionary of Music, 985 pages, ISBN 0-19-861459-4
- La revue des deux mondes, Volume 69 (1868). (in French)
- Lee, Carol (2002). Ballet in Western Culture: A History of Its Origins and Evolution. Routledge. ISBN 0-415-94257-8
- Moiraghi, Marco (2007), 'Dissoluto assolto, Il', in Dizionario dell'opera 2008, eds. Gelli, Piero and Poletti, Filippo. Milan: Baldini Castoldi Dalai, pp. 324–325. ISBN 978-88-6073-184-5 (in Italian)
- Senelick, Laurence (2000). The Changing Room: Sex, Drag and Theatre. Routledge. ISBN 0-415-15986-5
- Speake, Jennifer and LaFlaur, Mark, "en travesti" in The Oxford Essential Dictionary of Foreign Terms in English, Oxford University Press, 1999.
- Taylor, Millie (2007). British Pantomime Performance. Intellect Books. ISBN 1-84150-174-3
- Upper, Nancy (2004). Ballet Dancers in Career Transition. McFarland. ISBN 0-7864-1819-2
- Warrack, John; West, Ewan (1992). "travesti". The Oxford Dictionary of Opera. ISBN 0-19-869164-5.
