= Giuseppina Bozzacchi =

Italian ballet dancer

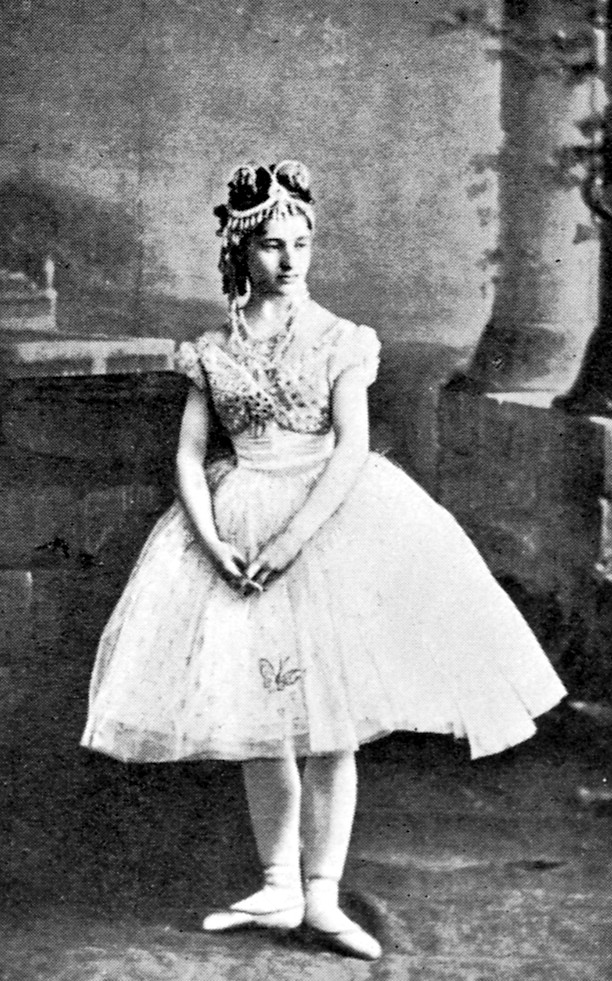
- Giuseppina Bozzacchi as Swanhilde in Coppélia
- Born: 23 November 1853; Milan, Austrian Empire
- Died: 23 November 1870 (aged 17); Paris, France
- Occupation: Ballet dancer

Giuseppina Bozzacchi (23 November 1853 – 23 November 1870) was an Italian ballerina, noted for creating the role of Swanhilda in Léo Delibes' ballet Coppélia at the age of 16 while dancing for the Paris Opera Ballet.

Bozzacchi, who was born in Milan, had come to Paris to study with Mme Dominique. The choreographer Arthur Saint-Léon and the director of the Académie Royale de Musique, Émile Perrin, had been searching for a suitable Swanhilda, after deciding that none of the ballerinas previously considered – Léontine Beaugrand and Angelina Fioretti – were suitable, while Adèle Grantzow, the favourite ballerina of Saint-Léon, had started to prepare the role with choreography in 1868 but then fell seriously ill. In 1869 they even asked the composer, Léo Delibes, to seek out a suitable Swanhilda on his trip to Italy. He returned empty-handed; in the meantime, Saint-Léon and Perrin had discovered 16-year-old Bozzacchi.

She created the Swanhilda role on 25 May 1870 in the presence of Emperor Napoleon III. She repeated her success in the following weeks. In July an international dispute broke out between France and Prussia over the succession to the Spanish throne, and on 19 July France declared war. Bozzacchi danced Swanhilda for the 18th and last time on 31 August, when the Paris Opéra closed for the duration of the Franco-Prussian War. The Opéra had stopped paying salaries, and Bozzacchi, weakened by lack of food, became ill. She contracted smallpox and fever and died on the morning of her 17th birthday. She was buried at Cimetière de Montmartre in Paris.
