= Jean-Baptiste Lavastre =

French painter

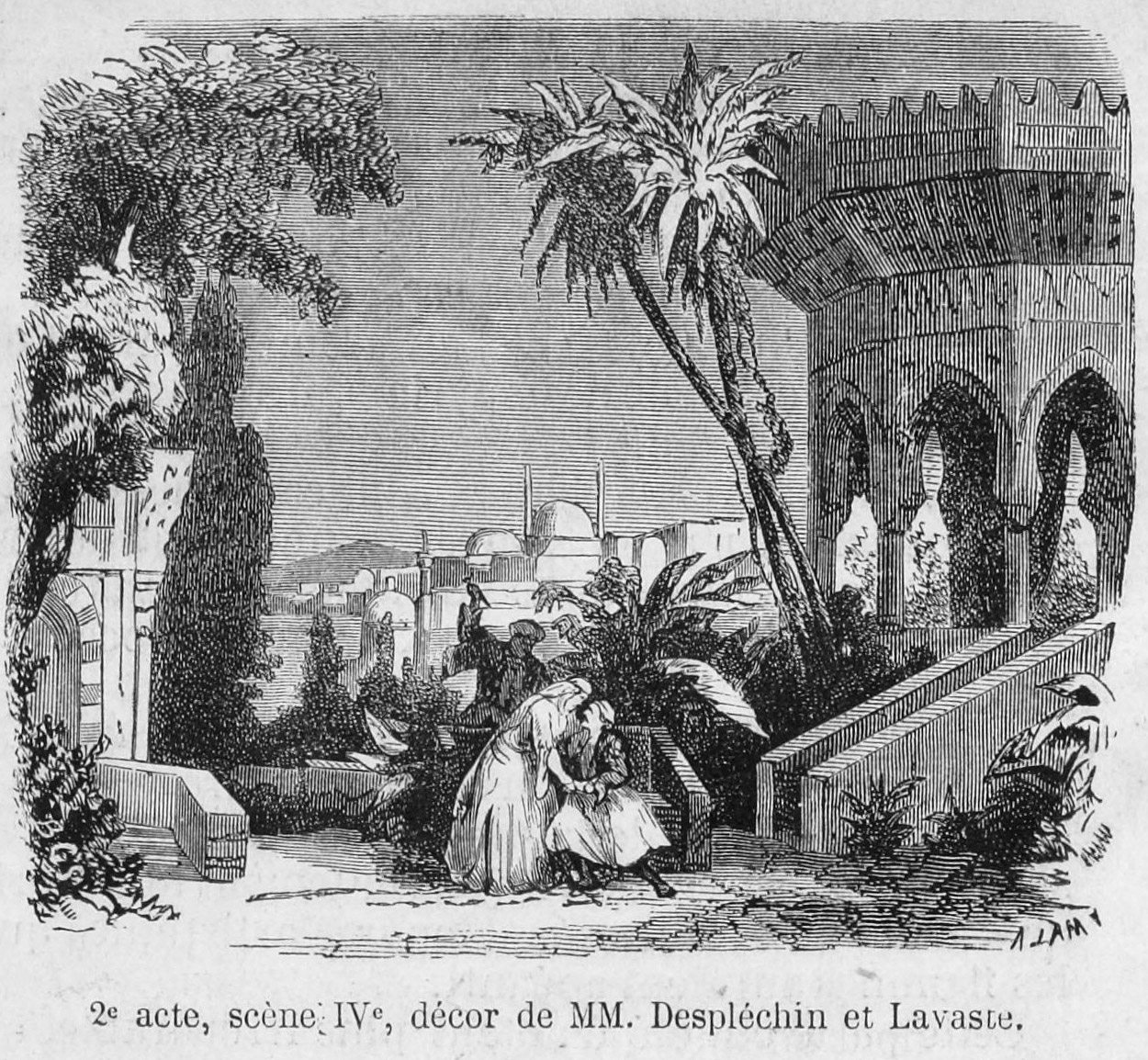
- Illustration for scene 4 of the 2nd act of La fiancée d'Abybos by Adrien Barthe, performed at the Théâtre lyrique of Paris (1865).
- Born: 24 August 1839
- Died: 24 April 1891 (aged 51); Paris, France
- Occupations: Painter, scenic director

Jean-Baptiste Lavastre (24 August 1839 – 24 April 1891) was a French landscape painter and scenic designer.

== Biography ==
A student of Édouard Desplechin as soon as 1854 when he was only fifteen (and then his associate from 1864 to 1870), Jean-Baptiste Lavastre eventually took over the workshop with his brother Antoine and Eugène Carpezat. They worked for the Opéra Garnier as well as for the Comédie-Française and the Opéra-Comique in Paris.

For the Opéra Le Peletier, he realised the decors, inter alia, for Hamlet by Ambroise Thomas, Don Giovanni, L'Africaine by Giacomo Meyerbeer. The Opéra-Comique, whose ceiling he painted, owes him the setting for Jean de Nivelle and the forest of Lakmé by Léo Delibes, Manon by Jules Massenet and The Tales of Hoffmann by Jacques Offenbach.

He is the author, among others, of the ceiling of the théâtre de l'Ambigu-Comique.

In 1871, he lived at 2 rue des Trois-Frères in Paris.

== Salons ==
- 1869 : Les Garrigues, environ de Nîmes;
- 1872 : Bords de la Méditerranée;
- 1873 : Une carrière près de Nîmes.

== Bibliography ==
- André Roussard, Dictionnaire des peintres à Montmartre, Éd. A. Roussard, Paris, 1999, p. 359 ISBN 9782951360105
