= Édouard Desplechin =

French scenic designer

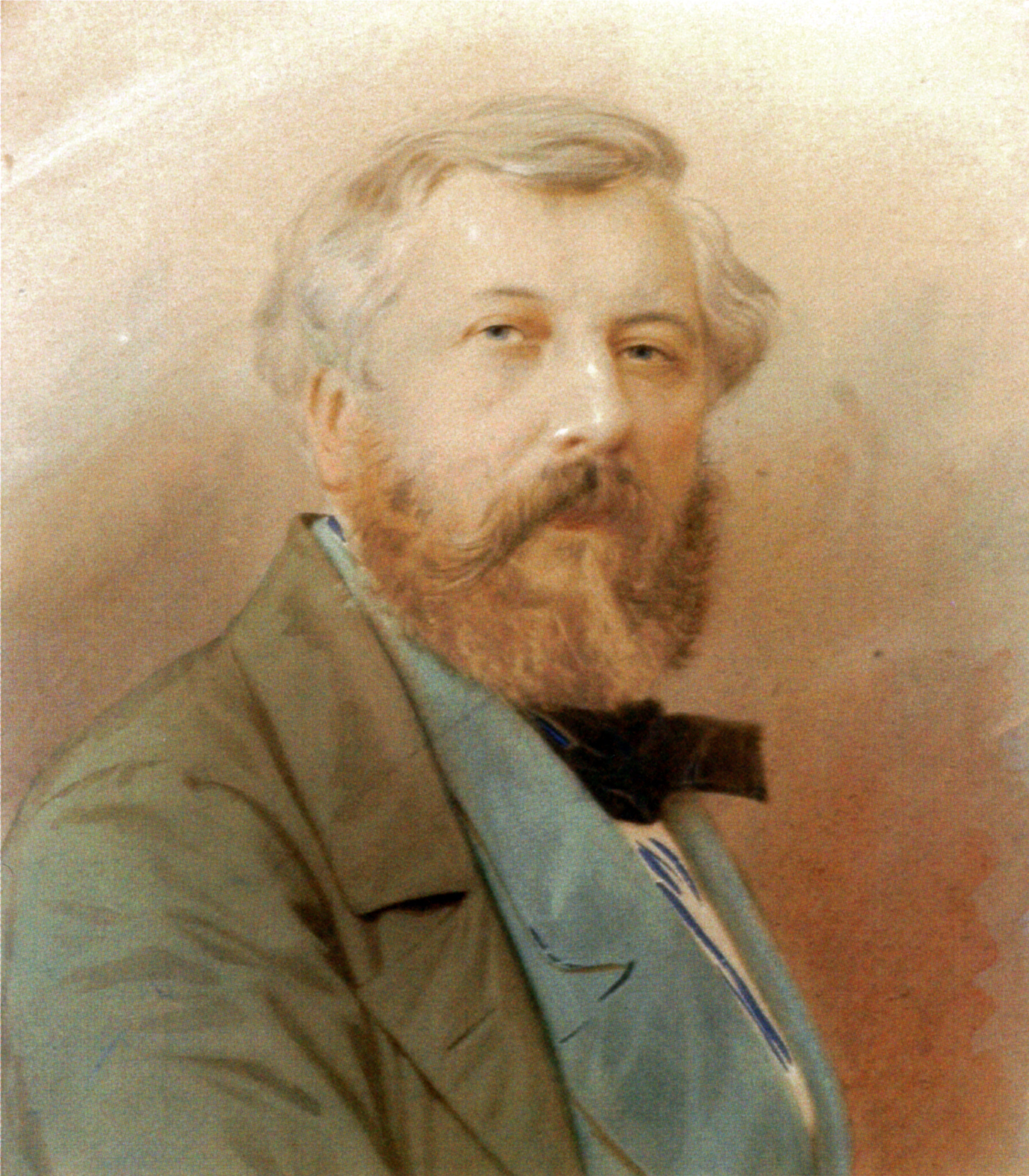
- Portrait of Édouard Desplechin (1851), anonymous.
- Born: 12 April 1802; Lille, France
- Died: 10 December 1871 (aged 69); Paris, France
- Known for: Scenic design

Édouard Desplechin (12 April 1802 – 10 December 1871), was a 19th-century French scenic designer, one of the most famous of his time.

== Biography ==
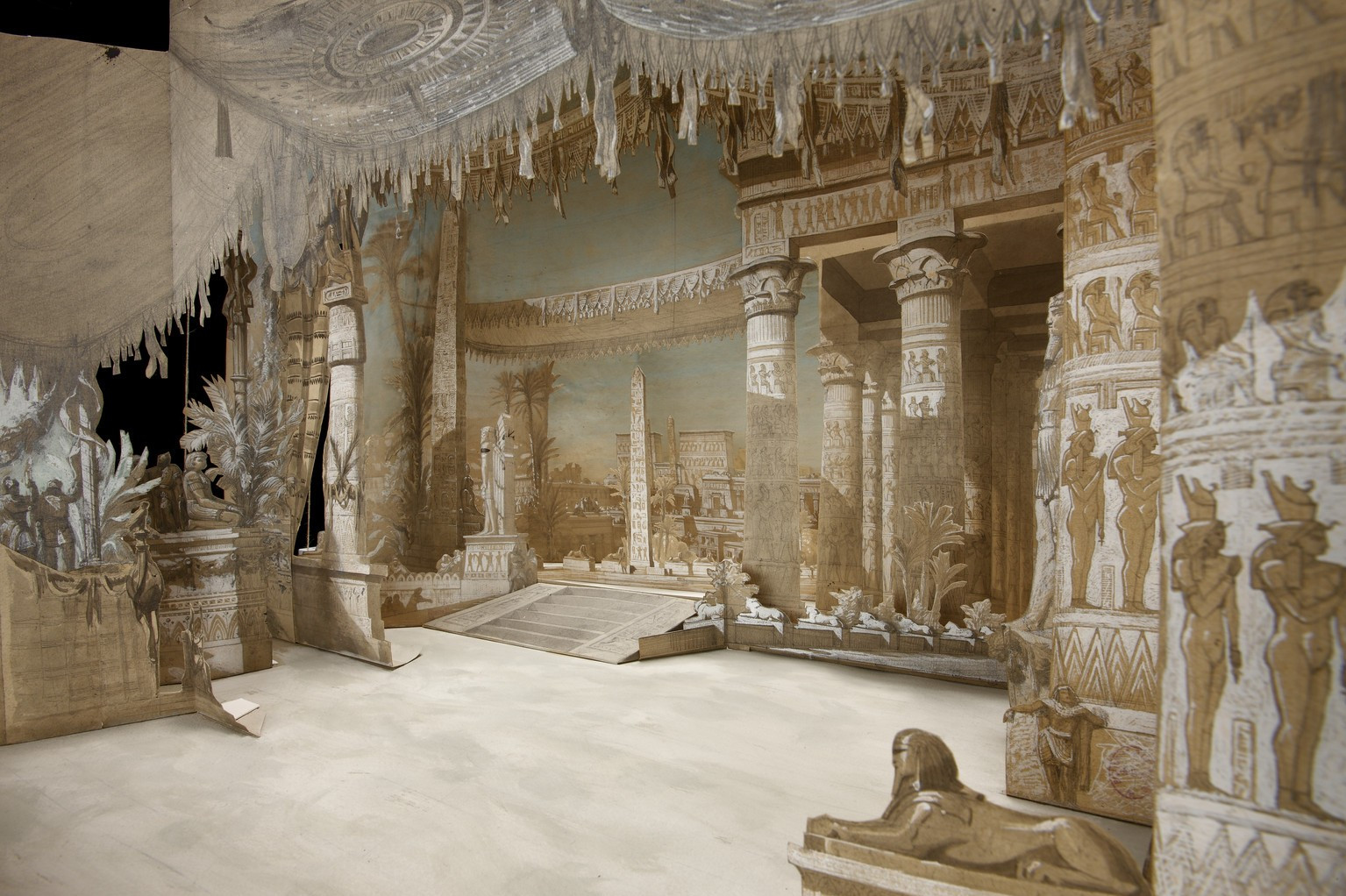
"Isis' temple", volume model for act III of Mosè in Egitto by Rossini

He created numerous settings for grands opéras and theatre plays of the romantic era, and closely collaborated with great composers such as Meyerbeer, Verdi, Gounod and Wagner.

His workshop was taken over by Eugène Carpezat and Jean-Baptiste Lavastre.

== Students ==
- Jean-Baptiste Lavastre (1839–1891).

== Bibliography ==
- Jean-Maxime Levêque, Édouard Desplechin, le décorateur du grand opéra à la française (1802-1871), L’Harmattan, collection « Univers musical », 2008, 198 p. ISBN 978-2-296-05620-6
