= Marie Sasse =

Belgian operatic soprano (1834–1907)

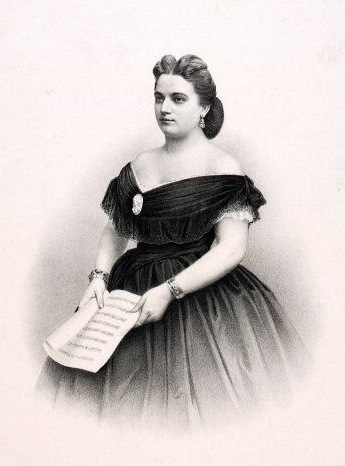
- Marie Sasse, circa 1860
- Born: Marie Constance Sasse; January 26, 1834; Oudenaarde, Belgium
- Died: November 8, 1907 (aged 73); Paris, France
- Other names: Marie Sax, Marie Saxe, Marie Sass
- Occupation: Opera singer
- Years active: 1852–1877
- Known for: Leading soprano at the Paris Opera
- Notable work: Tannhäuser (1861); L'Africaine (1865); Don Carlos (1867); Il Guarany (1870)

Marie Constance Sasse [Sax, Saxe, Sass] (26 January 1834 – 8 November 1907) was a Belgian operatic soprano. "Her voice was powerful, flexible, and appealing", and she was one of the leading sopranos at the Paris Opéra from 1860 to 1870. She created the roles of Elisabeth in the Paris premiere of Wagner's Tannhäuser, Sélika in the world premiere of Meyerbeer's L'Africaine, Elisabeth de Valois in the world premiere of Verdi's Don Carlos, and Cecilia in the world premiere of Gomes’ Il Guarany.

== Biography ==
Born Marie Constance Sasse in Oudenaarde, to a father who was a military band-master, she studied music at the Ghent Conservatory with François-Auguste Gevaert and in Milan with Francesco Lamperti, and made her debut in Venice as Gilda in Verdi's Rigoletto in 1852.

=== Early career at the Théâtre Lyrique ===
After the death of her father she found it necessary to work as a vocalist in the cafés of Brussels and Paris. The French soprano and vocal teacher Delphine Ugalde happened to hear her at the Café Géant in Paris. Ugalde gave her singing lessons and brought her to the attention of Léon Carvalho, who at that time was the director of the Théâtre Lyrique. Sasse made her debut at that theatre using the stage name Marie Sax on 27 September 1859, performing Rosine (Countess Almaviva) in Mozart's Les noces de Figaro. One reviewer wrote: "Mlle Sax possesses a magnificent voice, but both as a vocalist and as an actress, she is in the state of raw material—material however of undeniable quality and extraordinary aptitude, and which will undoubtedly reward the discoverer. ... It is fortunate that Mlle Sax's talents were discovered at an early stage as her voice is still fresh, and she has not been long enough in the exercise of her calling to form any vicious habits. Everything is, therefore, in her favor, and, launched in her present school, time and experience will ere long render her a valuable acquisition to the lyrical stage."

==== Berlioz and Gluck's Orphée ====
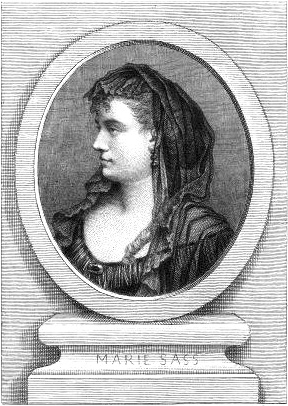
Sasse, c. 1855

Sasse followed her initial success at the Théâtre Lyrique with performances as Eurydice in Gluck's Orphée. The version of the opera which was used in this landmark revival was especially prepared by the composer Hector Berlioz, who also coached and rehearsed the singers, with Camille Saint-Saëns as his assistant. The opera had originally been written in Italian as Orfeo ed Euridice for Vienna in 1762, and the role of Orfeo was performed by the mezzo-soprano castrato Gaetano Guadagni. Gluck had decided to bring the opera to Paris in 1774, but castrato singers were unusual in France and sometimes objects of ridicule. Heroic lovers were generally played by high tenors, a voice type referred to in French as haute-contre, so Gluck transposed and adapted the role of Orphée for the haute-contre Joseph Legros. Unfortunately, the rise in standard pitch over the years had made the French version for haute-contre impractical, and the opera was rarely performed.

Giacomo Meyerbeer suggested to the Spanish mezzo-soprano Pauline Viardot that she should sing the role. Carvalho, who had heard Viardot in a concert, decided he wanted her to perform the opera in his theatre. Berlioz, a close friend of Viardot and an expert on the music of Gluck, was engaged to prepare the new adaptation. Initially Berlioz was enthusiastic, but when he heard that Carvalho was casting Mademoiselle Sax, a singer, as Berlioz described her, "from a café chantant in the other Champs-Elysées", he suggested that Carvalho's "good intentions" could "pave the way to hell". Sasse's inexperience became quite evident during the rehearsals: Berlioz thought her "ignorant as a carp of everything to do with art", although Viardot allowed she had "a beautiful voice without art". Subsequently Sasse became rather famous for a question she asked Viardot at one of the rehearsals, during which in typical fashion Berlioz kept interrupting the proceedings to make suggestions: "That's Monsieur Gluck, isn't it?" "No, it's one of his friends." "Well, he's got a nerve – in his absence!" (At the time, Gluck had already been dead for nearly 72 years.) In the event, the performances, which began on 18 November 1859, were enormously successful, both critically and commercially, and were attended by many of the important musicians in Paris. The production received 138 representations between 1859 and 1863. Although Viardot was the star of the show, Mlle Sax did not go entirely unnoticed, and the role proved to be the beginning of her rise to stardom.

==== Final season at the Théâtre Lyrique ====
Sasse next appeared at the Théâtre Lyrique beginning on 18 February 1860 as Bacchante in Gounod's Philémon et Baucis. This production was less successful: "it merely fizzled out after 13 indifferent performances." Probably at least partly because of this failure, Carvalho resigned as director of the company on 1 April, and the quality of performances at the theatre began to decline. Sasse also appeared at the theatre in a revival of Robin des bois (Robin Hood), which was a renowned and highly altered French travesty of Weber's Der Freischütz, originally translated and adapted by Sauvage and Castil-Blaze in 1824. There were also two concerts: the first a benefit for Viardot on 20 April, in which Sasse and Viardot sang an excerpt from Gluck's Armide; and the second, a benefit for Ugalde on 14 May, in which Sasse and Viardot sang in the last act of Orphée.

=== Career at the Paris Opéra ===
Sasse's success at the Théâtre Lyrique had been substantial, and she was engaged by the Paris Opéra to sing Alice in Meyerbeer's Robert le diable, making her house debut in the role on 3 August 1860. "Her voice was not yet mature, but it showed ample promise, and she was retained."

==== Wagner's Tannhäuser ====
Richard Wagner himself selected her to perform Elisabeth in what would become the notorious Paris premiere of Tannhäuser on 13 March 1861 at the Opéra's Salle Le Peletier. Although the presentation was a fiasco, Wagner praised Sasse's performance. She later related that Wagner had made some alterations to the part to accommodate her vocal range. She also possessed a score of the opera inscribed in the composer's hand:

A ma courageuse amie
Mademoiselle Marie Saxe.
L'Auteur
Richard Wagner.

To my courageous friend
Mademoiselle Marie Saxe.
The author
Richard Wagner

==== A leading soprano at the Opéra ====
She went on to successfully sing many of the important soprano roles in the company's repertoire at the time, including Léonore in Verdi's Le trouvère (the French version of Il trovatore) in 1861, Laura in Jósef Poniatowski's Pierre de Médicis in 1862, and Rachel in Halévy's La juive in 1863.

In September 1863 Verdi decided to make a valiant attempt to resuscitate the sagging fortunes of Les vêpres siciliennes. After the precipitous retirement of the soprano Sophie Cruvelli at the end of the first run of performances in the fall of 1855, the opera had done poorly. He pinned his hopes on casting the new stars at the Opéra: Sasse as Helène, and the tenor Villaret as Henri. The previous season Villaret had been well received in his debut, as Arnold in Rossini's Guillaume Tell. Verdi personally coached the singers, and wrote some new music, replacing Henri's "O jour de peine" with "O toi que j'ai chéri". The original aria had not satisfied Verdi when Louis Guéymard had sung it at the premiere.

In her memoirs Sasse described preparing the role with Verdi:

I have always loved working with authors and composers listening to their instructions trying to grasp their meaning ... Ah, but it was not the same as singing to Wagner or Meyerbeer! They were always patient, most careful to in no way hurt the feelings of an artiste. How different Verdi! He was exigeant hard, at times, I say it, almost cruel. Sharp words escaped him, and many times I have cried at the end of one of these hearings.
Then the master, having cooled down would apologize for his roughness, speak kind words of encouragement, and we would begin all over again with enthusiasm.
These lessons were of inestimable value to me, and, thanks to Verdi's counsel, my voice, still somewhat rough, became most flexible, and as a result of his teachings I achieved one of the greatest successes of my career.

However, the performances had failed to generate much enthusiasm for the opera. The press reported that with the exception of Mlle Sax the singers had been "out of voice". After a few more performances the opera was replaced with Il trovatore. There was one more revival in 1865, after which it vanished from the repertoire of the company entirely.

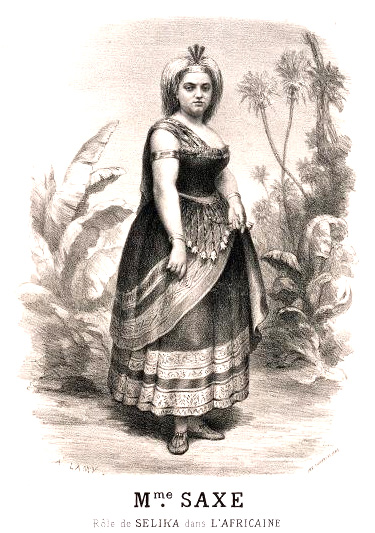
Saxe as Sélika in L'Africaine

Sasse married the French bass Armand Castelmary in 1864, but they divorced in 1867. In March 1865 the instrument maker Adolphe Sax brought suit against her demanding that she refrain from using Sax as her stage name. She complied by changing it to Saxe, prompting the periodical Le Ménestrel to conjecture that she might now be sued by "le Roi de Saxe, le duc de Saxe-Coburg-Gothe, le duc de Saxe-Meiningen", among others, for using this esteemed surname.

During this period she was selected by Giacomo Meyerbeer to create the role of Sélika in his new opera L'Africaine. She worked with him for three months preparing her part, and he agreed to some minor modifications to accommodate her capabilities. She sang the role at the premiere at the Paris Opéra on 28 April 1865.

In 1866 she performed Anna in Don Juan, a 5-act adaptation in French by Henri Blaze de Bury (son of Castil-Blaze) and Émile Deschamps which deviated significantly from the original, Mozart's Don Giovanni. First performed at the Opéra in March 1834, this version was very popular and continued to be performed there up to 1934, when it was replaced with a new version by Adolphe Boschot. In the year 1866 no fewer than three productions of Don Juan were presented in Paris, each using a different edition: besides the one at the Opéra, there was another at the Théâtre-Italien and a third at the Théâtre Lyrique. The year was made even more memorable for the singer, when the persistent Adolphe Sax again brought suit contesting her new stage name and insisting that his "individuality would suffer if she were allowed to continue using the name of Saxe." It was at this time that she began to use the stage name Sass. Walsh speculates "she may have disliked her real name because the word sasse in French means bailing scoop."

==== Verdi's Don Carlos ====
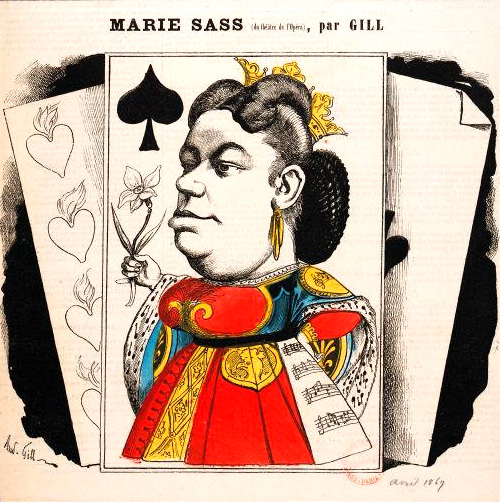
Cartoon of Marie Sasse as Elisabeth in Don Carlos

In the last months of 1866 Sasse was selected to create the role of Elisabeth de Valois in Verdi's Don Carlos. The Opéra's director Émile Perrin was having difficulty in casting the role of Eboli. He removed the original singer he had chosen for the part, the contralto Rosine Bloch, in order to spare her voice for the role of Fidès in a revival of Meyerbeer's Le prophète. He hoped to replace Bloch with the soprano Pauline Guéymard-Lauters, whose vocal range was exceptionally wide. In rehearsals she had proved herself capable of performing music with rather low notes. Unfortunately, Guéymard, who had sung Léonore in the 1857 revival of Le trouvère, was also a rival of Sasse.

Perrin wrote to Verdi about Guéymard: "If she commits herself firmly to undertake deep mezzo-soprano roles you might perhaps entrust her with the part of Eboli without changing a note of the tessitura, and we should gain by having two proven artists of incomparable cast." Verdi wrote back: "If you are not afraid of embarrassment resulting from rivalry between Mme Sass and Mme Gueymard, nothing could be better than Mme Gueymard for Eboli."

After the rehearsals began, Verdi realized he would have to make adjustments to the part of Eboli to accommodate Guéymard. Relations between the singers became strained, and Verdi stayed away at least once, on 18 October, as the librettist Camille du Locle reported to Perrin, "mainly because he was annoyed by Mme Sass's grimacing at the alterations made for Mme Gueymard." Julian Budden suggests "this was one of the factors which led to the eventual dropping of their one duet."

The rehearsals were endless, and the preparations for Don Carlos kept Verdi in Paris for nearly a year. By the time of the premiere on 11 March 1867, "all spontaneity had been lost." The production was not a success, although it did achieve 43 performances before disappearing from the repertoire until modern times. Some reviews specifically mentioned that the voice of Morère in the role of Don Carlos was inadequate for the part and characterized Mme Sass's portrayal as "bored" and "listless". Verdi later wrote to Du Locle (14 March 1868): "Ah, if only Sasse could be persuaded that the part is better than she believes. In Italy Stolz turned it into the main role." However, it should also be remembered that in 1867 Marie Sasse's marriage fell apart, and she divorced Armand Castelmary.

=== Late career ===
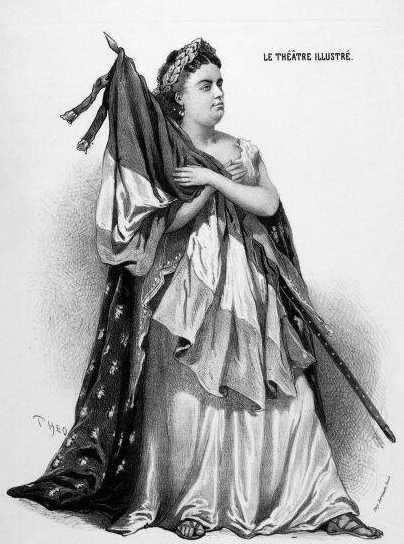
Marie Sasse singing the Marseillaise (Illustration from Le Théâtre illustré)

Other roles at the Opéra included Ophélie in Ambroise Thomas' Hamlet and Valentine in Meyerbeer's Les Huguenots (1868). She appeared at La Scala during the 1869–1870 season, but was back in Paris when the Franco-Prussian War broke out in the summer of 1870. Daniel Auber's La muette de Portici was performed "with the 'Marseillaise' interpolated into the third act and sung by Mme Sass with far more conviction than she had ever brought to Verdi's Elisabeth." After the French defeat at Sedan, as Prussian troops began to approach Paris, plans were made to convert the nearly finished, but still unoccupied new opera house, the Palais Garnier, into an emergency hospital. Sasse decided to quit the Opéra and emigrated to Italy. She appeared in Saint Petersburg during the 1870–1871 season.

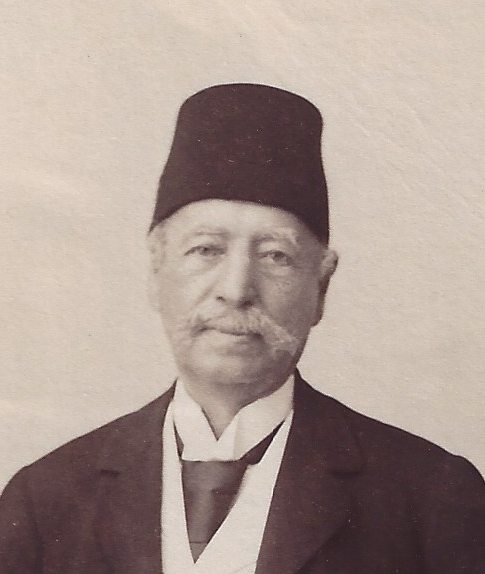
Draneht Pasha

In April 1871 Paul Draneht, the general manager of the Cairo Opera, negotiated with Sasse about the possibility of appearing as Amneris in the world premiere of Verdi's new opera Aida which was to be performed in Cairo later that year. He wrote about this to Verdi, who then wrote to Giovanni Battista Lampugnani, the theatrical agent in Milan: "I have no use for her – either as Amneris, who is a mezzo-soprano, or as Aida, for other reasons." Draneht visited Verdi at his home in Sant' Agata in May, where they discussed her further. Draneht, having been unaware of Verdi's opposition, had already signed her to sing Amneris. Verdi was adamantly opposed, not only because the part was too low, but because "I know from experience that it is in the interest of both the management and the composer to give her operas in which she is the only soprano, or at least an opera which has no other role equal or superior to hers."

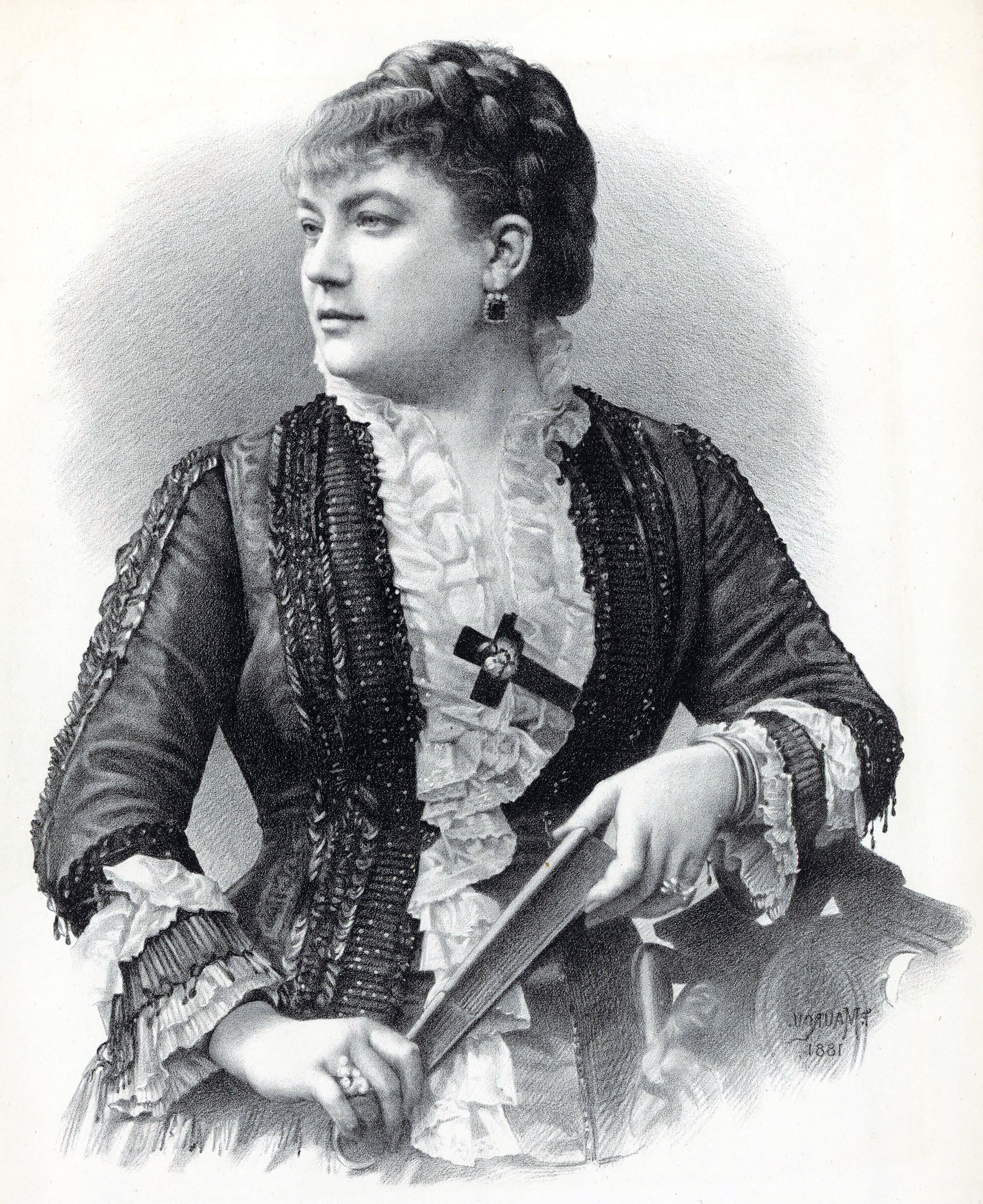
Marie Sasse by Paul Maurou (1881)

Draneht was in a bad position: the opera was completely cast, and, as the artist's fees had been exceptionally high, the budget for singers had been expended. In order to hire another singer for the role, Draneht would need the approval of the Viceroy of Egypt. The Viceroy, who had hired Italian architects to build the Cairo Opera House in six months in 1869, was underwriting the entire cost of the Aida production. His tendency to spend lavish amounts of money on inessential projects was later to drive Egypt into bankruptcy. Draneht tried to persuade Verdi that the mezzo-soprano Eleonora Grossi, who was already under contract with the company, would be able to sing the role, but Verdi resisted. Eventually Verdi received good reports about Grossi from other sources and relented.

W. E. Haslam, in his 1911 book Style in Singing, relates that Marie Sasse later stated that she had tried to prepare the role of Aida for the Cairo production, but found that at certain points the part was too high for her range. "As she was compelled by her contract to sing the opera, she asked Verdi to make some slight changes to bring the music within her reach. But he refused absolutely to make the least alteration." In speaking of it she said: "'Why should Verdi have shown himself more unreasonable or less yielding than Meyerbeer or Wagner?' (plus intransigent, plus intraitable que Meyerbeer ou Wagner?)."

During the course of her career Sasse had also sung the title role in Donizetti's Lucrezia Borgia and Amelia in Verdi's Un ballo in maschera, and appeared in Brussels, Madrid, and Barcelona. She retired from the stage in 1877 at the age of forty-three, tried to make a living teaching voice, and in 1902 published her memoirs under the title Souvenirs d'une artiste (Recollections of an artist). She died in Paris in "abject poverty" at the age of 73.
