= Guéymard =

Guéymard is a French surname that may refer to

- Adolphe G. Gueymard, American businessman
  - 38269 Gueymard, a main-belt asteroid
- Louis Guéymard (1822–1880), French operatic tenor
- Pauline Guéymard-Lauters (1834–1908), Belgian opera singer
