= Le Juif errant (opera) =

1852 grand opera by Fromental Halévy

- Grand opera by Fromental Halévy
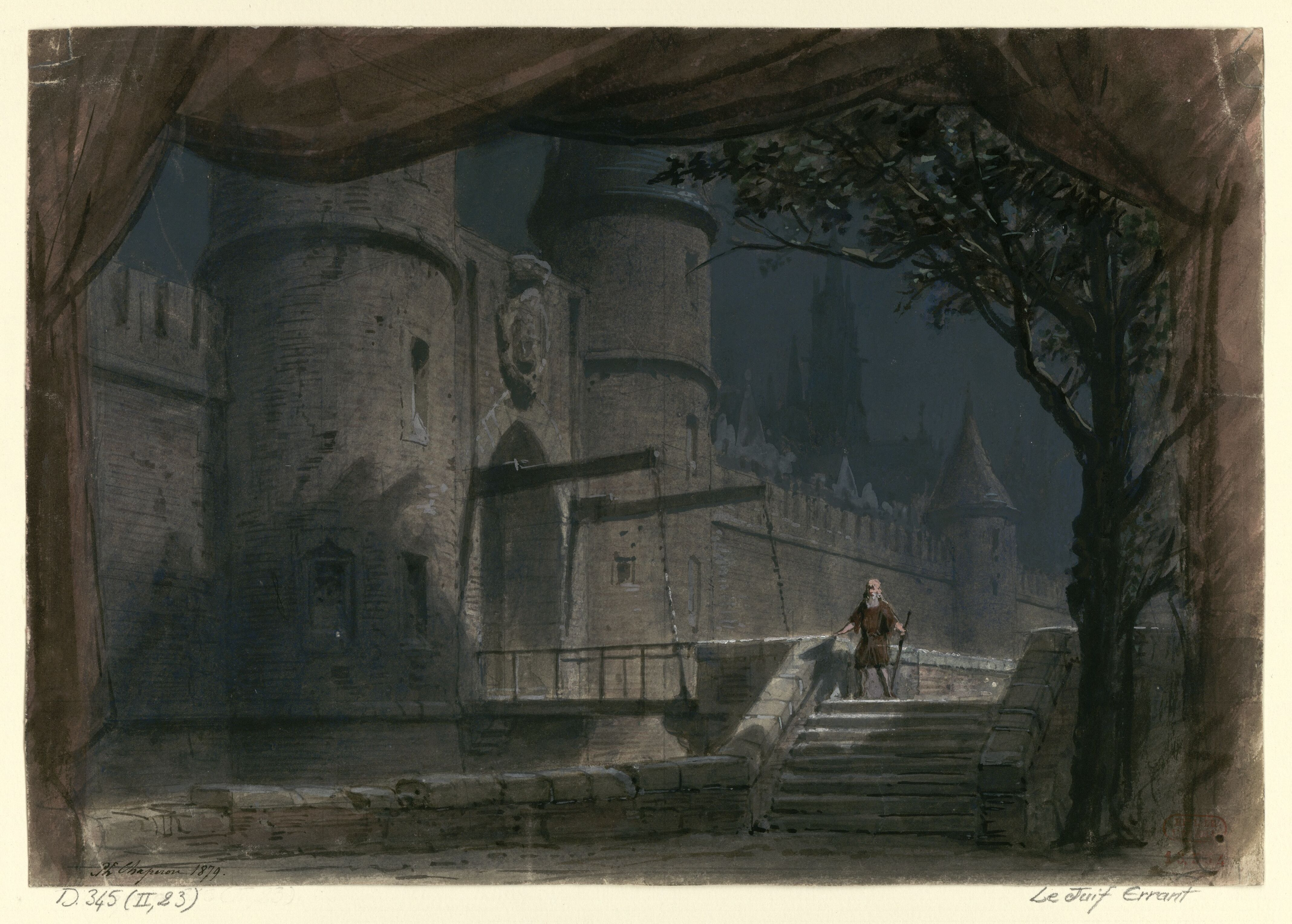
- Set design for the first act by Philippe Chaperon
- Translation: The Wandering Jew
- Librettist: Eugène Scribe; Jules-Henri Vernoy de Saint-Georges
- Language: French
- Based on: Le Juif errant by Eugène Sue
- Premiere: 23 March 1852; Salle Le Peletier, Paris

Le Juif errant (The Wandering Jew) is a grand opera by Fromental Halévy, with a libretto by Eugène Scribe and Jules-Henri Vernoy de Saint-Georges.

The opera is based extremely loosely on themes of the novel Le Juif errant, by Eugène Sue. Whilst the novel is set in 19th century Paris and the Wandering Jew is incidental to the main story-line, the opera begins in Amsterdam in 1190 and the Jew Ahasuerus (spelled Ashvérus in the opera) is a leading character.

== Performance history ==
Le Juif errant was premiered at the Salle Le Peletier of the Paris Opera on 23 April 1852, and had 48 further performances over two seasons. The music was sufficiently popular to generate a Wandering Jew Mazurka, a Wandering Jew Waltz, a Wandering Jew Polka and in France just in the several months after the opera was premiered an even more considerable quantity of piano works, including several called "Grande fantaisie dramatique" and similar titles, based on the opera.

== Roles ==
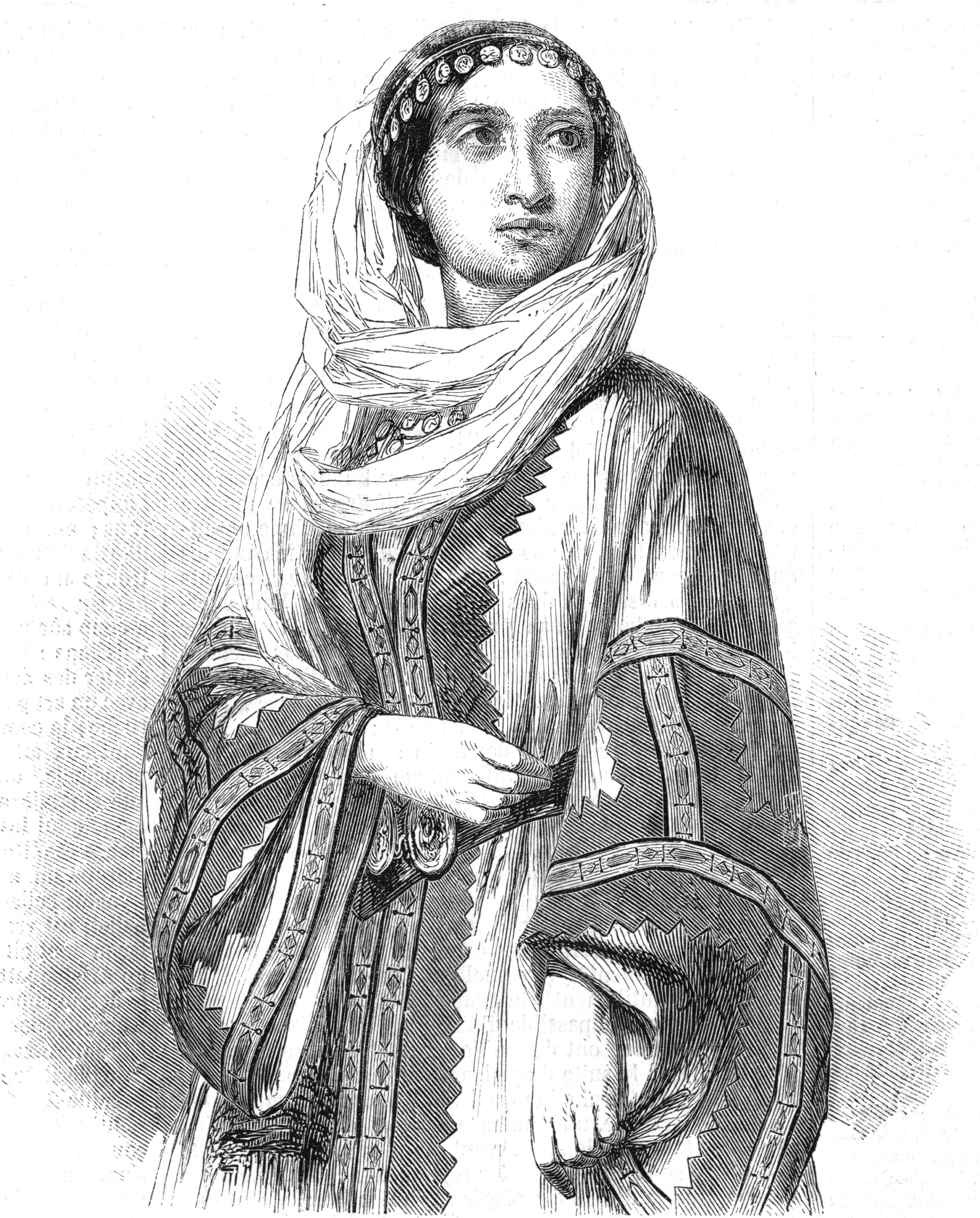
Emma La Grua in the role of Irène

Roles, voice types, premiere cast
Role	Voice type	Premiere cast, 23 April 1852 Conductor: Narcisse Girard
Ashvérus, the Wandering Jew	baritone	Eugène Massol
Nicéphore, Emperor of the Orient	bass	Louis-Henri Obin
Léon, descendant of Ashvérus	tenor	Gustave-Hippolyte Roger
Théodora, boatwoman of the Scheldt, sister of Léon	mezzo-soprano	Fortunata Tedesco
Irène, daughter of Baudoin, Count of Flanders, also a descendant of Ashvérus	soprano	Emma La Grua
Lady of honor	soprano	Petit-Brière
The exterminating angel	tenor	Chapuis
Ludgers, bandit chief	bass	Depassio
Manoel, first bandit	bass	Canaple
Andronic, second bandit	bass	Guigneau
Jean, third bandit	bass	Noir
Arbas, fourth bandit	bass	Goyon
Night watchman	baritone	Merly
An officer of the palace	baritone	Lyon
A lord	baritone	Molinier
Another lord	tenor	Donzel
Chorus: lords, ladies, and people of Antwerp; robbers and bad boys; shopkeepers, inhabitants of Brabant; lords and ladies of Emperor Nicéphore's court; people of Thessalonica; people of Constantinople; mutes, almées (harem entertainers), slaves; Emperor's guards; Empress Irène's lady; angel, demons, the chosen, the damned, etc.
