= Rosine Bloch =

French opera singer

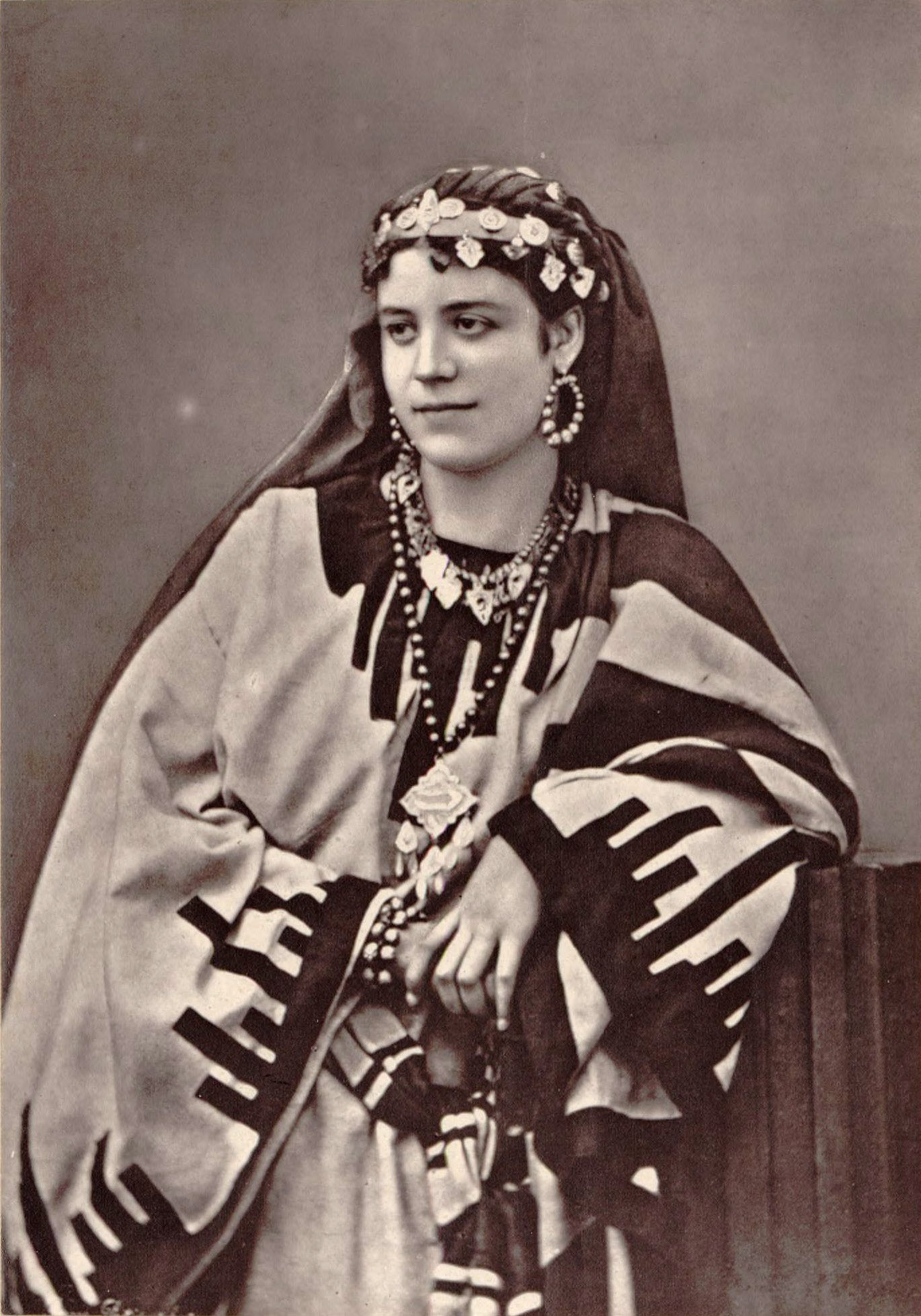
Rosine Bloch

Rosine Bloch (7 November 1844 – 1 February 1891) was a French operatic mezzo-soprano of Jewish descent who had a successful stage career in Europe between 1865 and 1891. She not only possessed a beautiful, warm, and lyrical voice but was also a remarkably beautiful woman physically. Although most of her career was spent performing at the Opéra in Paris, she also appeared in stages in Belgium, Monaco, and England.

== Biography ==
Bloch was born in Paris, the daughter of a merchant. She studied at the Conservatoire de Paris with Nicolas Levasseur and Charles-Amable Battaille and in 1865 won the Conservatoire's first prize for singing and the first prize for opera.

She made her professional opera debut on 13 November 1865 at the Opéra's Salle Le Peletier as Azucena in Giuseppe Verdi's Le trouvère, and continued singing in that theatre, where her most notable roles included Lelia in Félicien David's Herculanum and Léonore in Gaetano Donizetti's La favorite. She also sang Edwige in Gioacchino Rossini's Guillaume Tell (with Jean-Baptiste Faure as Guillaume and Marie Battu as Mathilde in 1868 and with Caroline Carvalho as Mathilde in 1870), and Fidès in Giacomo Meyerbeer's Le prophète in 1872. Although Bloch was striking in appearance with an ample, rich-timbred voice, it had become apparent over time that her portrayals lacked the "human quality" necessary for her to become a major star. Nevertheless, in the ensuing years she remained an honorable and respected member of the company.

She also created two roles, Lysis in the world premiere of Jules Duprato's 1-act La Fiancée de Corinthe, which had a libretto by Camille du Locle and was first performed on 21 October 1867, but was an opera that would soon fall into obscurity after only 14 representations, and Claribel in Eugène Diaz's 3-act La Coupe du Roi de Thulé, which had a libretto by L. Gallet and Edouard Blau and premiered on 10 January 1873, but would only be performed 21 times. The latter had won a competition which had been held by the Ministry of Fine Arts in 1869.

Early in 1870 the Théâtre Lyrique on the Place du Châtelet lost its director Jules Pasdeloup, and the artists of that company made a desperate attempt to manage the company on their own. The director of the Opéra, Émile Perrin, magnanimously granted the Lyrique the rights to perform Fromental Halévy's Charles VI, which had first been performed at the Opéra in 1843 and was last seen there in 1850. The soprano Hélène Brunet-Lafleur, who was cast in the leading role of Odette, abandoned the Lyrique's production, and Perrin allowed Bloch to take on the part. The revival was delayed after Bloch became ill with influenza, but eventually opened on 5 April 1870. It was described by a former director of the Opéra, Nestor Roqueplan, as a fiasco, but received 22 representations. However, on 31 May the Théâtre Lyrique folded, and Bloch returned to the Opéra.

After the Opéra moved to the Palais Garnier, Bloch repeated some of her roles in new productions at that house, including Léonore in Donizetti's La favorite (21 January 1875, 443rd representation of the opera), and Fidès in the Meyerbeer's Le prophète (16 August 1876, 322nd representation of the opera). She also sang Catarina Cornaro in Halévy's La reine de Chypre (16 August 1877), Queen Gertrude in Ambroise Thomas' Hamlet (12 August 1878), and Amneris in the Opéra's first performance of Verdi's Aida (22 March 1880), before retiring from the company.

Verdi had considered casting Bloch as Eboli in the premiere of his opera Don Carlos in 1867, but finally selected Pauline Guéymard-Lauters for that role. The soprano Teresa Stolz, who attended the dress rehearsal for the Paris premiere of Aida with Verdi's wife, described Bloch as "a most beautiful Amneris: she may not be an 'eagle,' but in any case, she is much better than our two Milan Amnerises (of this year)."

Appearances with other companies included performances at La Monnaie in Brussels (1870 and 1874), the Opéra de Monte-Carlo in Monaco (1879), and the Royal Opera House, Covent Garden in London (1879 as Leonora in La favorite).

She married on 14 May 1884 in Brussels becoming Mme S. Lévy, but continued to perform. On 31 October 1890 she sang the role of Dalila in the Paris premiere of Camille Saint-Saëns's Samson et Dalila at the Éden-Théâtre. She died in Monte Carlo (or Nice) in 1891.
