= Louis-Henri Obin =

French operatic bass

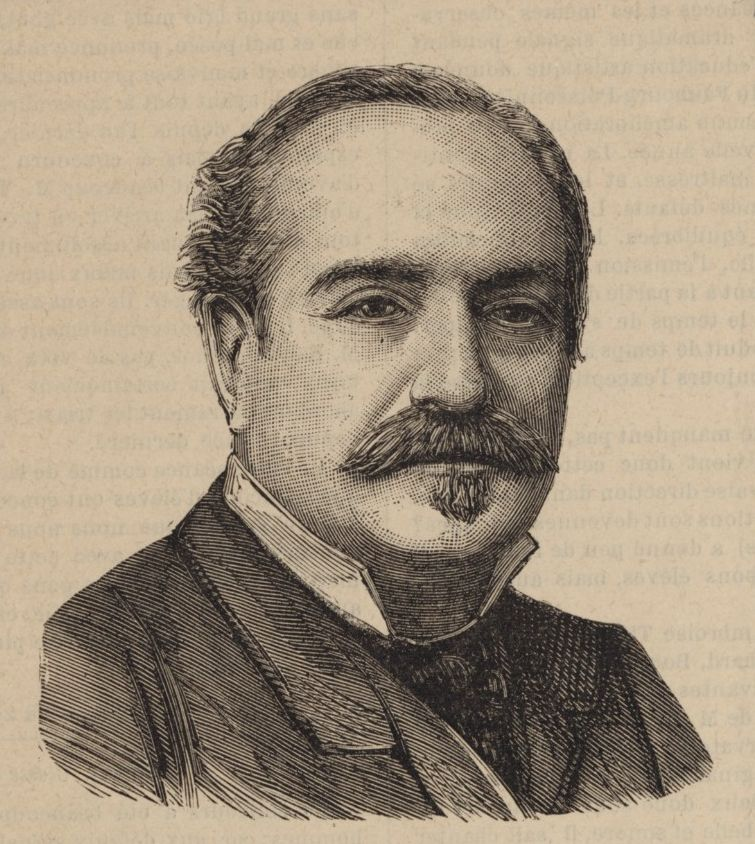
Louis-Henri Obin

Louis-Henri Obin (4 August 1820 in Ascq, near Lille – 9 November 1895 in Paris), was a French operatic bass. He created some of the most notable roles in French grand opera at the Paris Opera, including the part of King Philip II in Verdi's Don Carlos.

== Education and career ==
Born in Ascq, Louis-Henri Obin studied singing at the Conservatoire de Lille with Antoine Ponchard and then at the Conservatoire de Paris. He made his professional debut in 1844 at the Paris Opera in the role of Elmiro in Rossini's Otello and continued his career there, playing leading bass roles in many operas, until he retired from the stage in 1869. He came out of retirement to perform in operas once again for a brief time in 1871.

At the Paris Opera, Obin created roles in the world premieres of several important operas. These included some of the most important bass parts in French grand opera, including Procida in Verdi's Les vêpres siciliennes (1855), the King in the same composer's Don Carlos (1867), and the High Priest of Brahma in Meyerbeer's L'Africaine (1865). In 1850 he performed in the Paris Opera's first staging of Louis Niedermeyer's Marie Stuart and created several parts in the world premiere of Daniel Auber's L'enfant prodigue. In 1853 he performed in the world premiere of Armand Limnander's Le Maitre à Chanter and in 1859 he created the role of Nicanor / Satan in Félicien David's Herculanum.

In 1863 he performed several roles at the Royal Opera House, Covent Garden, including Balthazar in La favorite, Bertram in Robert le diable, Don Basilio in The Barber of Seville, Leporello in Don Giovanni, and the title role in Mosè in Egitto. After his retirement from the stage, Obin taught singing at the Conservatoire de Paris. He was awarded the Legion of Honour in 1890.
