= Gustave-Hippolyte Roger =

French tenor

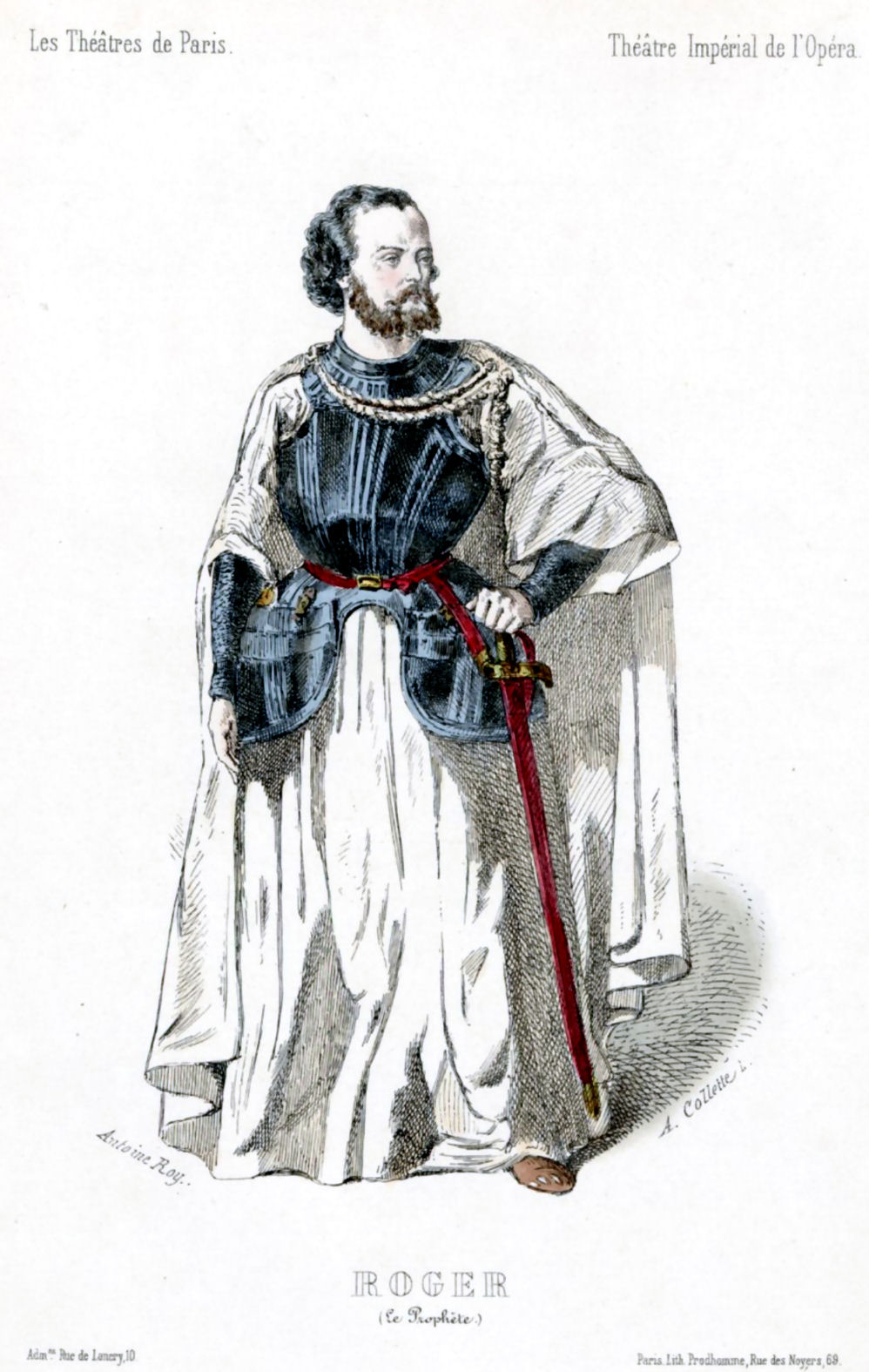
Roger as John of Leiden in the original production of Le prophète

Gustave-Hippolyte Roger (17 December 1815 – 12 September 1879) was a French tenor. He is best known for creating the leading tenor roles in La damnation de Faust by Berlioz in 1846 and Meyerbeer's Le prophète in 1849.

== Early years and education ==
Born in Paris and orphaned at an early age, Roger was brought up in Paris by his uncle. He entered the Paris Conservatoire and studied with Blès Martin. At the completion of his training, he won first prize in singing and declamation.

== Career ==
In 1838, Roger made his professional debut at the Opéra-Comique, Paris, in L’éclair by Fromental Halévy. He went on to create numerous leading roles in new operas with that company, including works by Daniel Auber (Raphaël in La Part du Diable, 1843 and Lorédan in Haydée, 1847, and others), Halévy (Edgard in Le shérif, 1839, Olivier in Les Mousquetaires de la Reine, 1846, and others). Roger was the first Marquis in Perruquier de la Régence by Ambroise Thomas in 1838 and at the same theatre in 1846, the first Faust in La damnation de Faust by Hector Berlioz. He won praise for his clear, pure tone, his skill as a stage performer, and his musical intelligence. In 1848, after a tour of England with soprano Jenny Lind he moved from the Opéra-Comique to the Opéra where he created the title role in Meyerbeer's extremely successful opera Le prophète in 1849. He also created roles there in L’Enfant prodigue by Auber, 1850, in Le Juif errant of Halévy, 1852, and in Herculanum by Félicien David, 1859, as well as singing in revivals of popular works such as La favorite and Lucia di Lammermoor of Donizetti and Les Huguenots of Meyerbeer. Between 1850 and 1860, Roger made seven highly successful concert tours of Germany.

== Later years ==
In 1859, Roger had to have an arm amputated after a hunting accident. Nevertheless, with an artificial arm, he continued to sing in concerts and in opera productions. From 1868 until his death, Roger taught singing at the Paris Conservatoire. One his students was tenor Julius Prott (aka Guilio Perotti).

== Critical assessment ==
In the opinion of some contemporary critics, Gustave-Hippolyte Roger was perfectly suited, both as singer and actor, for the kind of roles with which he began his career at the Opéra-Comique, but some of the music he had to sing in roles at the larger Paris Opera, such as his most famous part, Jean in Le prophète, was too heavy for his voice and caused vocal decline.
