= Armand Castelmary =

French operatic bass (1834–1897)

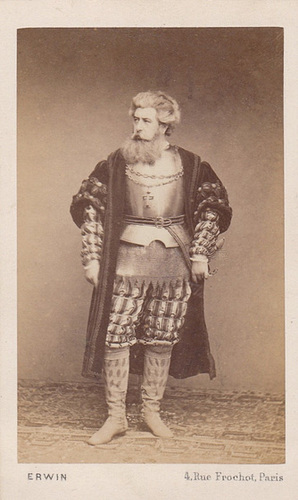
Castelmary as Don Diego in Meyerbeer's opera L'Africaine, 1865

Armand Castelmary, real name Comte Armand de Castan (16 August 1834 – 10 February 1897), was a French operatic bass. He created roles in three major premieres at the Paris Opera – Don Diego in L'Africaine by Meyerbeer (1865), the Monk in Verdi's Don Carlos (1867), and Horatio in Ambroise Thomas's Hamlet (1868). Castelmary also appeared at opera houses in England and the United States, and died onstage at the Metropolitan Opera House, New York, during a performance of Martha by Friedrich von Flotow.

== Career and death ==
Castelmary was born in Toulouse. He was a member of the Paris Opera from 1863 to 1870, where he created the three significant roles in the French grand operas listed above. He was married (later divorced) to the soprano Marie Sasse, who created the role of Élisabeth in Verdi's Don Carlos. He made his debut at the Royal Opera House, London, in 1889 and sang there in many subsequent seasons. Castelmary toured the United States with several different opera companies in 1870, 1879 and 1890 and made his debut at the Metropolitan Opera in New York in 1893. He died onstage at the Metropolitan Opera in New York during a performance of Flotow's Martha. The audience, not realising he was suffering a heart attack, thought his physical collapse was a stroke of fine acting and rewarded him with a loud ovation as the curtain was lowered. His funeral mass was celebrated on February 10, 1897, at St. Vincent de Paul Church in Manhattan.
