= Bernardine Hamaekers =

Belgian singer

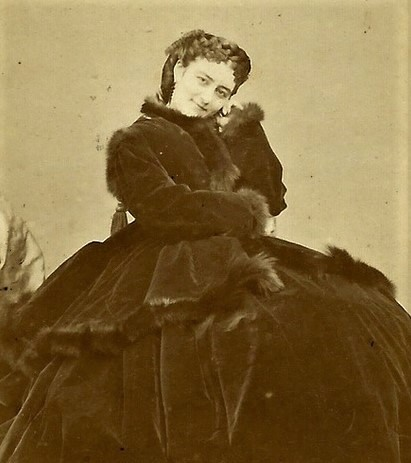
- Born: Caroline Frédérique Bernardine Hamaekers; 12 June 1836; Louvain, Belgium
- Died: 24 October 1912 (aged 76); Brussels, Belgium
- Occupation: Opera singer

Caroline Frédérique Bernardine Hamaekers (Note: Her surname has also been rendered in various sources as Hamakers, Hamackers, and Hamäkers.) (12 June 1836 – 24 October 1912) was a Belgian soprano prominent in the opera houses and demimonde of Paris from the mid-1850s through 1869. For a time she was the mistress of Napoleon III, but had several other lovers. In 1870 she returned to Belgium where she was a prima donna at the Théâtre Royal de la Monnaie until her retirement from the stage in 1884. Her last years in Brussels found her almost destitute. In a fit of despair she committed suicide at the age of 76.

== Life and career ==
Hamaekers was born in Louvain, Belgium, one of the ten daughters of Guillaume and Anne-Catherine (née Vanderwalen) Hamaekers. Her father was an inn-keeper and a veteran of the Battle of Austerlitz. She initially studied singing in Louvain with Mme. Mathieu-Marin and then at the Brussels Conservatory, making her first concert appearance in 1855. On the encouragement of Eugène Scribe, she went to Paris accompanied by one of her sisters for further study with Gilbert Duprez and later François Delsarte. While still studying she came to the attention of the Duke of Morny who provided her with a handsome carriage and a sable cloak amongst other gifts. The duke, who was the half-brother of Napoleon III, used his influence to get her hired by the Paris Opéra where she made her debut on 12 September 1856 as Mathilde in Rossini's Guillaume Tell. Through Morny she was also engaged as a singer for the chapel of the Tuileries Palace and was a soloist at the baptismal mass of Napoleon III's son Louis-Napoléon.

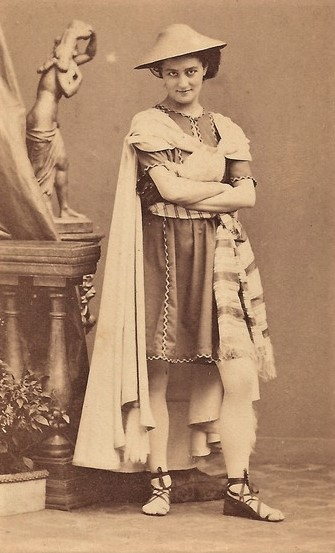
Hamaekers as Bénoni in La reine de Saba

She was described in contemporary accounts as not being a great singer but having a pretty and agile coloratura voice with clear and brilliant high notes and a facility with trills equal to that of Adelina Patti. She was also known for having a very attractive stage presence and made a specialty of appearing in a variety of en travesti roles which allowed her to show off her legs. Amongst those were Urbain, the Queen's page in Les Huguenots and the young student Bénoni which she sang in the world premiere of Gounod's La reine de Saba. During the course of her 15 years at the Opéra she appeared in a variety of other operas, including Robert le diable, La Juive, Le Prophète, Le comte Ory, and Les Vêpres siciliennes.

She was the intimate of the composers Rossini, Meyerbeer and especially Auber, whose pet name for her was "Didine". She attracted a string of lovers who provided her with considerable wealth, the most prominent of which was Napoleon III who gave her an emerald and diamond necklace. At the height of her career, she had a house in Paris, a chateau at Fontainebleau, and spent her summers renting the country-seat of the president of the Jockey-Club de Paris or the Marquis du Hallez's chateau. However, much of her fortune was dissipated by one of her last Parisian lovers who was addicted to gambling. With the outbreak of the Franco-Prussian War in 1870 she left France, gave concert tours and was then engaged as a highly paid prima donna at the Théâtre Royal de la Monnaie. Amongst her roles there was Venus in the theatre's first performance of Wagner's Tannhäuser.

== Later years ==
Hamaekers retired from the stage in 1884, but kept up a lively correspondence with the literary critic and historian Frédéric Loliée, sharing her reminiscences of Parisian social and musical life during the Second French Empire. She gave singing lessons for a while but became increasingly destitute in her old age. In October 1912, at the age of 76 and in a fit of despair, she threw herself from the window of her apartment in Brussels. She did not immediately die from her injuries and was taken to the St. Jean Hospital, where she was placed in the care of a psychiatrist. On 24 October she smashed a drinking glass that had been left in her hospital room and used it to slit her own throat. She died at 3 o'clock that afternoon.
