= La reine de Saba =

Grand Opera by Charles Gounod

- Grand opera by Charles Gounod
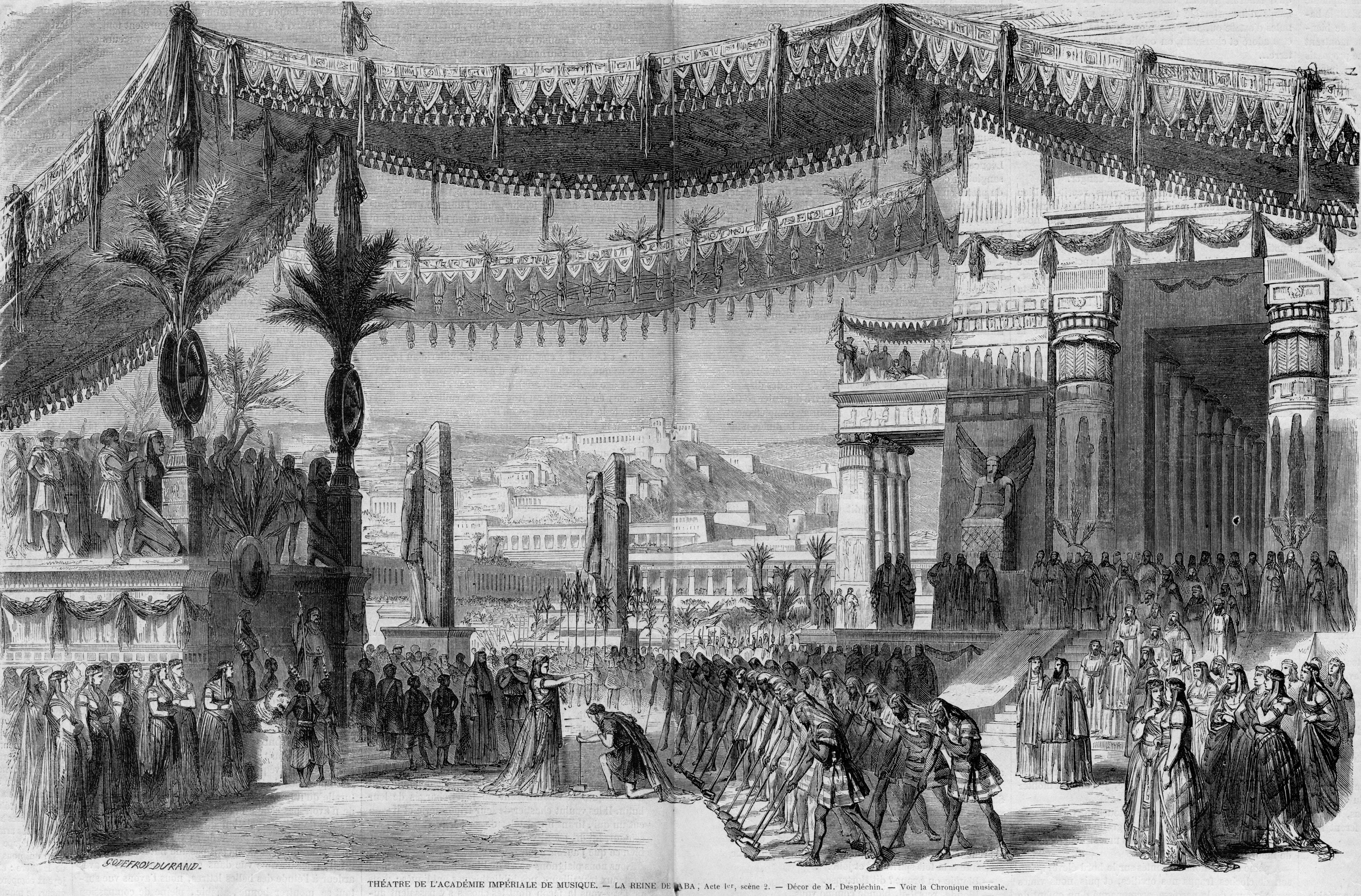
- Act I, scene 2 in the premiere, design by Édouard Desplechin
- Translation: The Queen of Sheba
- Librettist: Jules Barbier; Michel Carré
- Language: French
- Based on: Le voyage en Orient by Gérard de Nerval
- Premiere: 28 February 1862; Salle Le Peletier, Paris

La reine de Saba (The Queen of Sheba) is a grand opera in four or five acts by Charles Gounod to a libretto by Jules Barbier and Michel Carré inspired by Gérard de Nerval's La Reine de Saba, in Le voyage en Orient. It was premiered at the Salle Le Peletier by the Paris Opera on February 28, 1862. The magnificent first production was directed by Eugène Cormon, with costumes designed by Alfred Albert and Paul Lormier, and scenery by Édouard Desplechin (Act I), Charles-Antoine Cambon and Joseph Thierry (Acts II and IV, scene 2), Hugues Martin (Act III), and Joseph Nolau and Auguste Alfred Rubé (Act IV, scene 1).

== Roles ==
Role	Voice type	Premiere Cast, 28 February 1862 (Conductor: Pierre-Louis Dietsch)
Balkis, the queen	soprano	Pauline Guéymard-Lauters
Bénoni	mezzo-soprano	Bernardine Hamaekers
Sarahil	mezzo-soprano	Tarby
Adoniram, sculptor and architect of the first temple	tenor	Louis Guéymard
Soliman, the biblical Solomon	bass	Jules-Bernard Belval
Amrou	tenor	Raphaël-Auguste Grisy
Phanor	baritone	Mécène Marié de l'Isle
Méthousaël	bass	Théodore-Jean-Joseph Coulon
Sadoc	bass	Frèret

== Synopsis ==
=== Act 1 ===
The workshop of Adoniram in Jerusalem

Adoniram, sculptor and architect of Solomon's Temple, prays to Tubal-cain, who was the first metal-worker according to the Bible, for help in his latest monumental project, the forging of an enormous bowl, a "sea of bronze" (Air: "Inspirez-moi, race divine!"). Three of Adoniram's workers, Amrou, Phanor and Méthousaë, enter and demand of him increased privileges and better pay, but Adoniram dismisses them. An emissary from Soliman invites him to the ceremony welcoming the legendary beauty, Balkis the Queen of Sheba, at the temple he designed. The three disgruntled employees of Adoniram plot to get back at him.

In front of the magnificent temple of Soliman

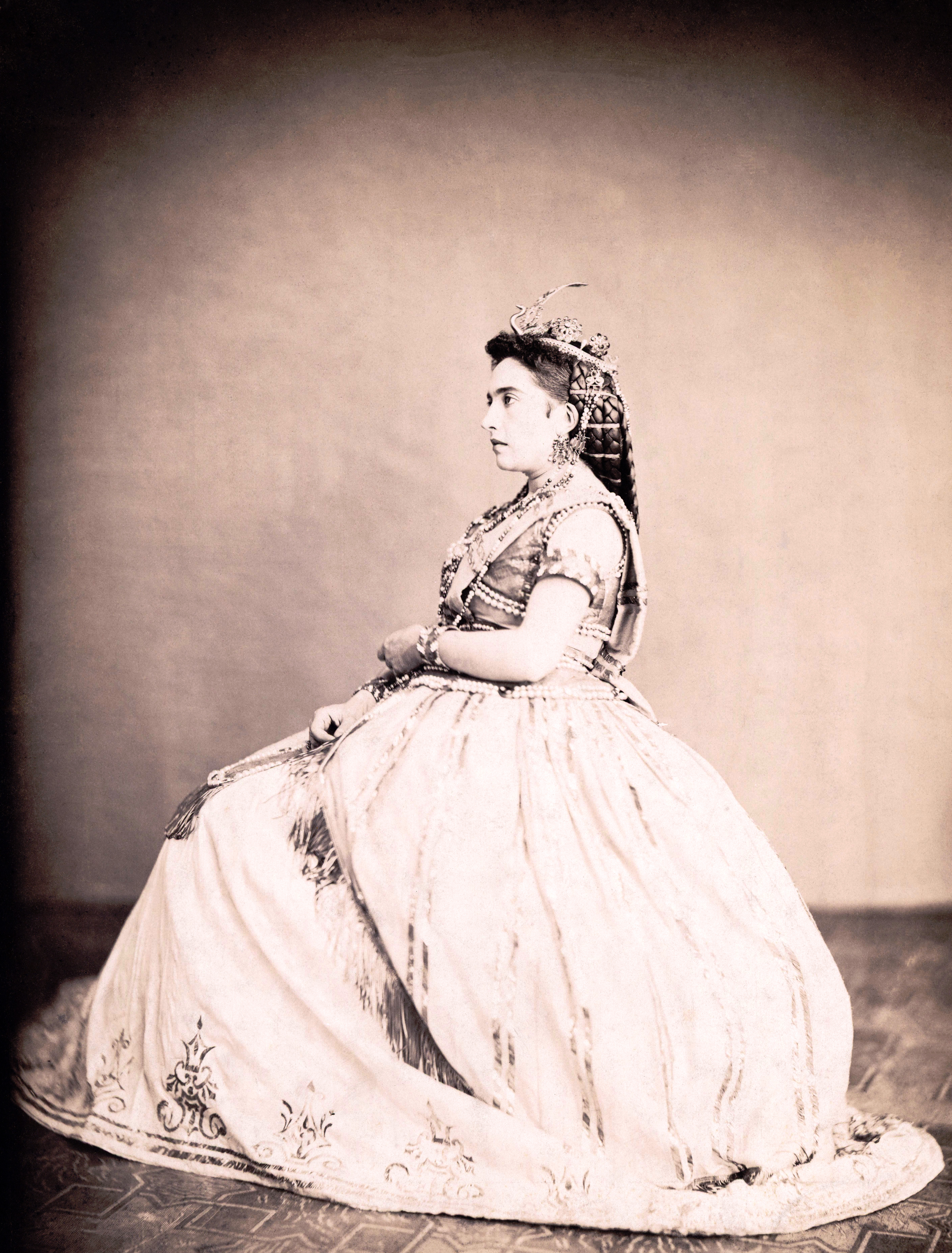
Pauline Guéymard as Balkis, the Queen of Sheba, 1862

A march and procession announce the arrival of Balkis, the Queen of Sheba, on a state visit to Jerusalem. Soliman asks her for the ring she promised him as a symbol of their engagement; she gives it to him with reluctance. Balkis is tremendously impressed by the splendour of the temple and asks to meet the architect. She is presented to Adoniram and gives him a necklace as a mark of her esteem. This, and Adoniram's popularity with the crowd, arouse Soliman's jealousy.

=== Act 2 ===
A site in Jerusalem, with a blast furnace

The King, Balkis and the people have come to watch the casting of Adoniram's "sea of bronze". However, Amrou, Phanor and Méthousaël have sabotaged the process and molten metal pours out uncontrolled. All run for cover as the furnace explodes.

=== Act 3 ===
A clearing in the woods where Balkis and her suite have their quarters

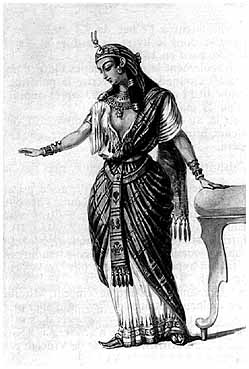
Costume for Balkis, 1862

After a ballet of her serving-women Balkis reflects on the love she feels for Adoniram (Cavatina: Plus grand dans son obscurité). He appears, and abashed by the public failure of his forging of the "sea of bronze", tries to return to her the necklace she gave him. She refuses to take it and the pair confess the love they feel for each other (Duet: Qu'importe ma gloire effacée). Benoni, Adoniram's assistant, appears with the news that the mould of the "bronze sea" was repaired, apparently by supernatural agency, and the cast is now completed. As Adoniram, Balkis and her suite give thanks to Tubal-cain for hearing Adoniram's prayers, Amrou, Phanor and Méthousaël, who have been watching these proceedings unobserved, resolve to tell the King of Adoniram's and Balkis' love.

=== Act 4 ===
A splendid room in Soliman's summer palace

Soliman is distressed by Balkis' apparent reluctance to wed him as she agreed (Air:Sous les pieds d'une femme). Amrou, Phanor and Méthousaël inform the King about Adoniram's and Balkis' tryst but the King does not believe them. Adoniram appears and rejects the King's attempts to appease him. After he leaves, Balkis enters and asks to delay the wedding, which arouses Soliman's fury. A sleeping powder is put into his drink and Balkis slips the ring she gave him off his finger while he is unconscious.

=== Act 5 ===
A narrow gorge in the midst of a storm

Adoniram is waiting for Balkis to elope with him, as they had arranged, at this spot. Instead, Amrou, Phanor and Méthousaël appear and renew their demands, which he again rejects. They stab him and flee. The Queen arrives and is horrified to find Adoniram dead. She slips the ring she had given to Soliman on to Adoniram's finger and bitterly mourns his death over his body (Finale:Emportons dans la nuit ).

== US premiere ==
Odyssey Opera, Boston, gave the US premiere of the opera in a concert version on 22 September 2018.

== English version by Henry Farnie ==
An English reworking of the libretto by Henry Farnie "interwoven [with] certain legends and traditions of freemasonry" was titled Irene. It transposed the action to Istanbul in the time of Suleyman the Magnificent and the building of the Great Mosque and used almost all of Gounod's music. It was not a success.

== Highlights ==
Grand March from La reine de Saba
Performed by the U.S. Marine Band in 1954.

One of the main fragments from La reine de Saba is the tenor aria 'Inspirez-moi, race divine!', in which the hero invokes the example of the sons of Tubal-cain (son of Lamech and Zillah, the founder of metalworking) as the molten metal flows into its mould. In its English version 'How vain and weak a thing is man... Lend me your aid, O race divine', this became a war-horse of the concert repertoire, surviving into the 20th century in the recordings of Edward Lloyd and Walter Widdop. It was also recorded by Enrico Caruso, in one of whose versions the English text was re-translated back into French with the exceptionable formula: 'Prête-moi ton aide'.

Balkis' cavatina "Plus grand dans son obscurité" has been recorded by Francoise Pollet, Elīna Garanča, Elizabeth Whitehouse, Marian Anderson and Karine Deshayes.

== Recordings ==
Francesca Scaini (soprano) La Reine Balkis, Jeon-Won Lee (tenor) Adoniram, Anna Lucia Alessio (soprano) Bénoni, Annalisa Carbonara (soprano) Sarahil, Luca Grassi (baritone) Le Roi Soliman, Salvatore Cordella (tenor) Amrou, Jean Vendassi (baritone) Phanor, Pietro Naviglio (bass) Méthousaël, Volodymyr Deyneka (bass) Sadoc; Bratislava Chamber Choir and Italian International Orchestra conducted by Manlio Benzi. A live performance from the 2001 Valle d'Itria Festival; the text uses the vocal score made by Bizet, with one restored scene, a shortened ballet, and a few cuts.
