= L'enfant prodigue (Auber) =

Opera by Daniel Auber

- Grand opera by Daniel Auber
- Librettist: Eugène Scribe
- Language: French
- Based on: Parable of the Prodigal Son
- Premiere: 6 December 1850; Salle Le Peletier, Paris

L'enfant prodigue (The Prodigal Son) is a grand opera in five acts composed by Daniel Auber to a French libretto by Eugène Scribe based on the Parable of the Prodigal Son in Chapter 15 of the Gospel of Luke. It was first performed at the Théâtre de l'Académie Nationale de Musique in Paris on 6 December 1850. The role of Azaël (the prodigal son of the title) was sung in the premiere by the celebrated French tenor, Gustave-Hippolyte Roger, (1815-1879).

A stage production, "Azael, the prodigal : a grand romantic spectacle, in three acts" using excerpts from the opera, selected and arranged by one Henri or Henry Laurent; Edward Fitzball, librettist; was first performed at the Theatre Royal, Drury Lane on 19 February 1851.

The ballet music was used by Constant Lambert in 1933 for the ballet Les Rendezvous with choreography by Frederick Ashton.
