= Herculanum (opera) =

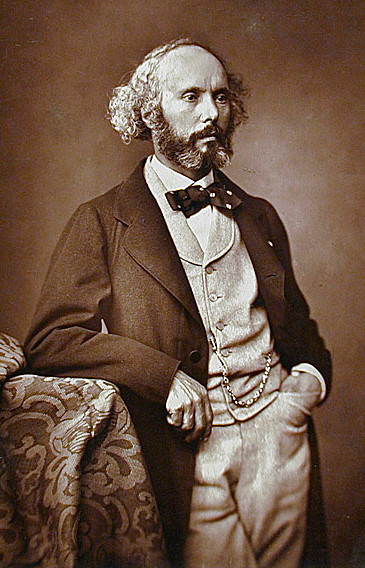
Woodburytype of Félicien David

Herculanum is a grand opera with music by Félicien David and a French text by Joseph Méry and Térence Hadot. It had its first performance in Paris at the Théâtre Impérial de l'Opéra on 4 March 1859. Lavish and detailed sets, celebrated stars of the opera and ballet, elaborate choruses and dancing, and spectacular stage effects combined with the music and text to make the work a success.

== Roles ==
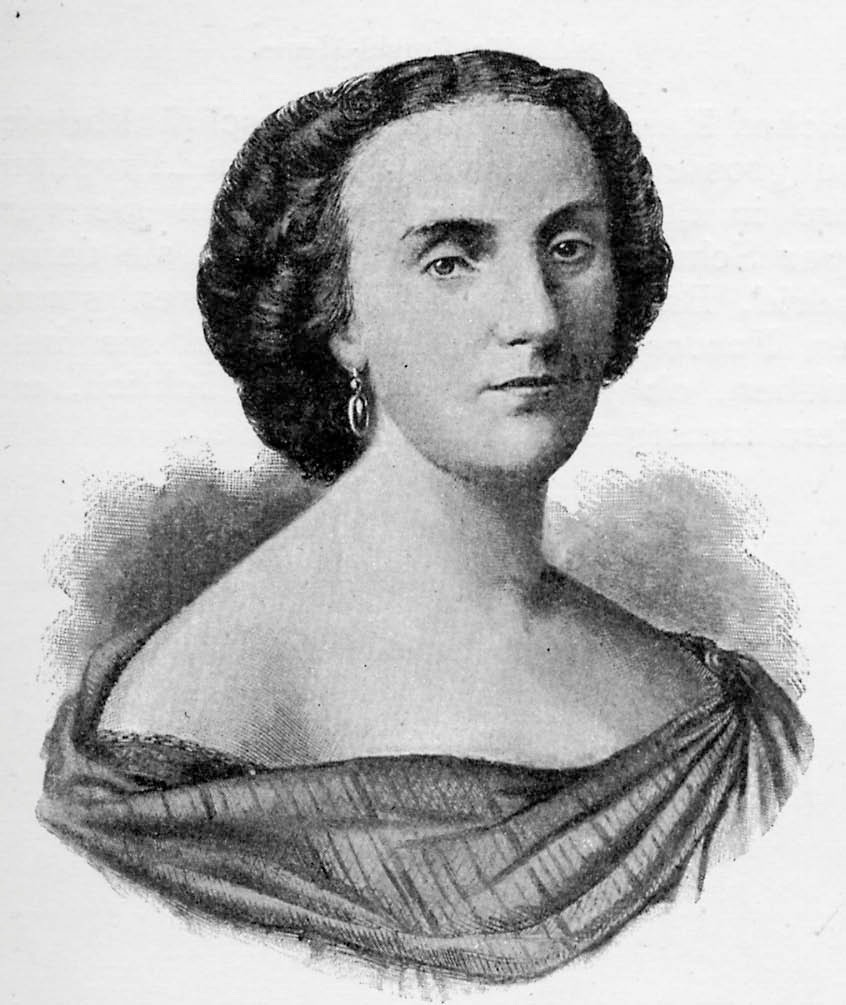
Adelaide Borghi-Mamo, who created the role of Olympia

Roles, voice types, premiere cast
Role	Voice type	Premiere cast, 4 March 1859
Lilia	soprano	Pauline Guéymard-Lauters
Olympia	mezzo-soprano	Adelaide Borghi-Mamo
Hélios	tenor	Gustave-Hippolyte Roger
Nicanor / Satan	bass	Louis-Henri Obin
Magnus	baritone	Claude-Marie-Mécène Marié de L'Isle

== Synopsis ==
Scene: Herculaneum, 79 AD

=== Act 1 ===
The palace and gardens of Olympia at the right; to the left, sphinxes mark the Egyptian quarters of the city, where cargo arrives from the port of Alexandria. In the background, temples, villas, and palaces

Olympia is receiving tribute from visiting monarchs and dignitaries in her palace. Hélios and Lilia, two Christians, are dragged in by a mob demanding they be put to death. The proconsul Nicanor, Olympia's brother, thinks this is a good idea, but Olympia, much struck by Hélios' good looks, declines to do so and sends everyone else away. Alone with Hélios, she gives him a magic potion and seduces him. An earthquake shakes the ground and the prophet Magnus appears, warning of a forthcoming catastrophe.

=== Act 2 ===
A remote, uninhabited location in a valley on the outskirts of the city. On the right, a small hill with rocks, broken columns and ruins. A cross is at the top of the hill, which Christians use as a place of worship. The sun is setting

Just as Olympia was immediately taken with Hélios, her brother Nicanor was instantly enamoured of Lilia, and has tracked her down to the Christians' meeting place to try to seduce her. Lilia is not interested however and rejects him. She does not believe him when he claims to have converted to Christianity. Her rejection infuriates Nicanor and he denies that her God exists. He is immediately struck dead by lightning and Lilia swoons away. Satan himself arrives, declaring his enjoyment of inflicting suffering and agony on all humanity. He decides to let Lilia know that her sweetheart Hélios has been unfaithful to her, and when the girl regains consciousness, shows her a vision of Hélios and Olympia making love. Satan gathers up Nicanor's cloak and disguises himself as Olympia's brother.

=== Act 3 ===
The gardens of the queen. Behind a hill on the right, a temple dedicated to Hercules.On the left, a view across the bay to the city of Naples. A triumphal arch in the centre

Hélios yields to the blandishments of the Queen. Festivities and dances ensue, but Lilia arrives in the middle of them to claim Hélios as hers. Olympia tells Hélios that if he does not marry her and rule with her as her consort, she will have Lilia executed. Satan, in his guise as Nicanor, advises Olympia that it would make Lilia suffer more to live and witness Hélios' marriage to her. In order to save Lilia's life, Hélios agrees to wed Olympia, to Satan's delight.

=== Act 4 ===
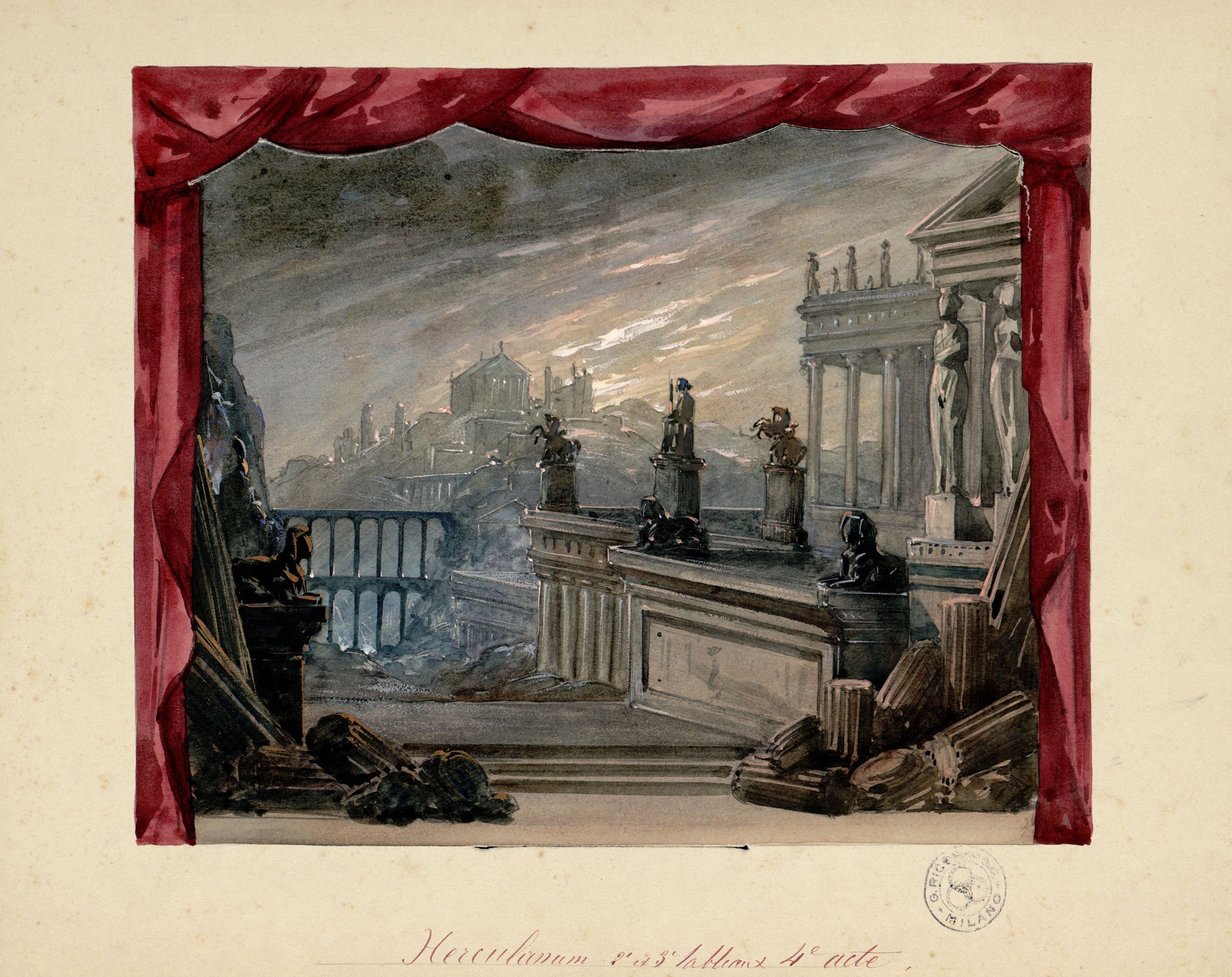
Terrazza del palazzo di Olympia, set design for Herculanum act 4 scene 2 (1859).

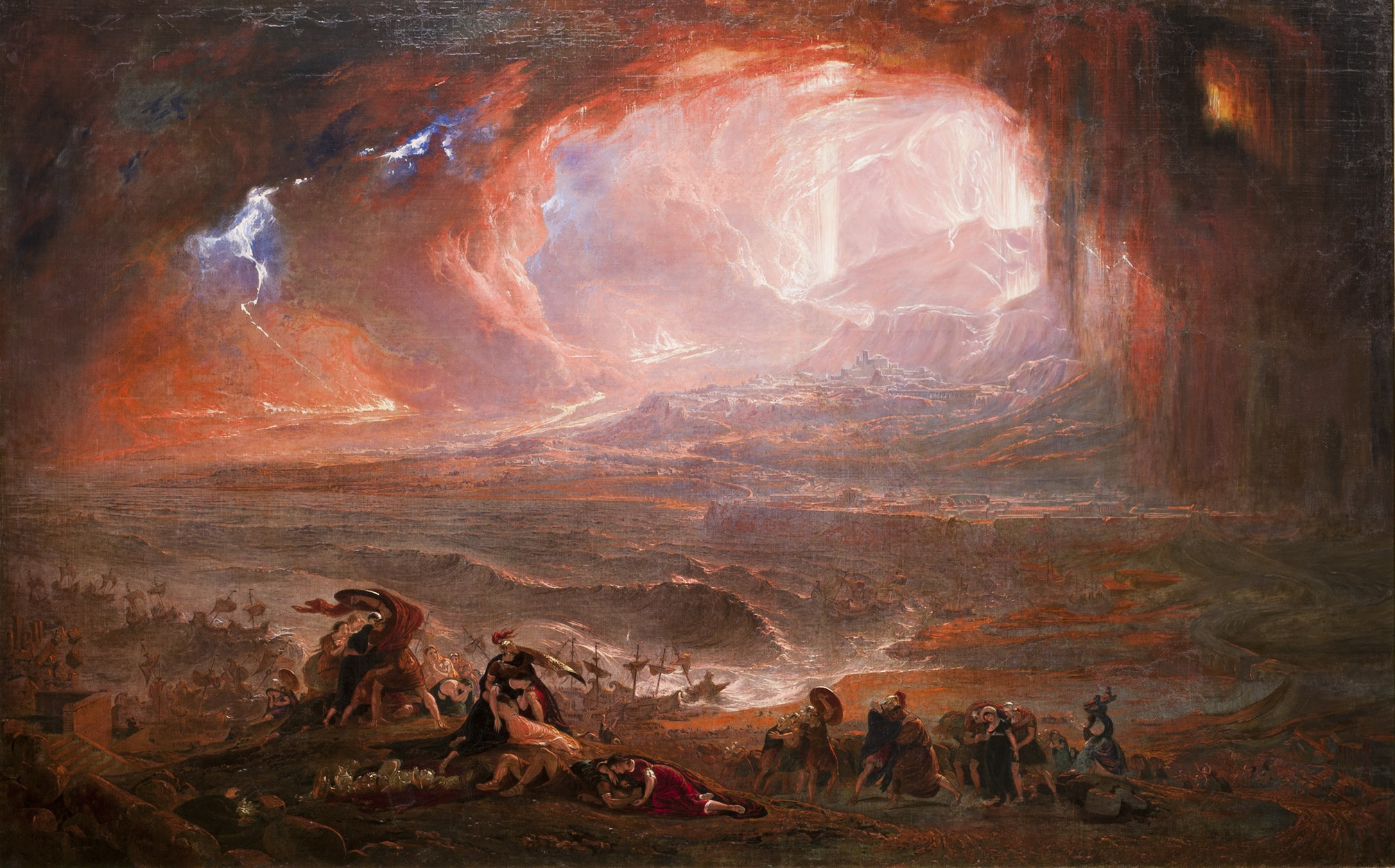
Destruction of Pompeii and Herculaneum, by John Martin

The grand hall of Queen Olympia's magnificent palace, richly ornamented with decorations in the Etruscan style

Tremors repeatedly shake the ground. Satan summons the slaves of the queen and encourages them to revolt. The earthquake grows more and more intense, storms and lightning appear in the skies and all around buildings start to collapse.

The palace terrace, which is supported by Doric columns, on one side a facade with Caryatids, on the other a facade with Corinthian columns. On the left, a road lined with sphinxes leads to a temple dedicated to Isis. In the background, an aqueduct with two levels of arches leads to the slopes of Mount Vesuvius

Hélios appears on the terrace and calls Lilia's name, as all around structures fall to the ground. Lilia comes to him and pardons him for his betrayal of her with Olympia. In the background Mount Vesuvius is erupting. Satan reveals to Olympia that he is not really her brother, but the devil. The volcano explodes, spewing wave after wave of rocks, ashes and lava, destroying all the buildings and annihilating the assembled populace and the entire cast. The Christians are not sorry to die as they are assured of salvation.

== Reception and performance history ==
The four leading roles were taken at the premiere by stars of the day, and celebrated ballerina Emma Livry appeared in the ballet in act three, earning encomiums from contemporary critics. The elaborate and detailed sets and stage effects also won much acclaim. Hector Berlioz praised David's music for its "many beauties." Herculanum was revived numerous times, and received 74 performances at the Paris Opera until 1870. The opera was revived at the Théâtre Royal de La Monnaie, Brussels, in 2014, and given a concert performance at the Chateau du Versalles the same year. Herculanum was performed in a new production at the Wexford Festival, Ireland, in 2016.

== Recording ==
Véronique Gens: Lilia, Karine Deshayes: Olympia, Edgaras Montvidas: Hélios, Nicolas Courjal: Nicanor/Satan, Julien Véronèse: Magnus; Brussels Philharmonic Orchestra, Flemish Radio Choir, Hervé Niquet, conductor. Recorded 2014, Released 2015. Ediciones Singluares (Palazzetto Bru Zane - Centre de musique romantique française), ES 1020. CD
