= Pauline Guéymard-Lauters =

Opera singer based in Paris

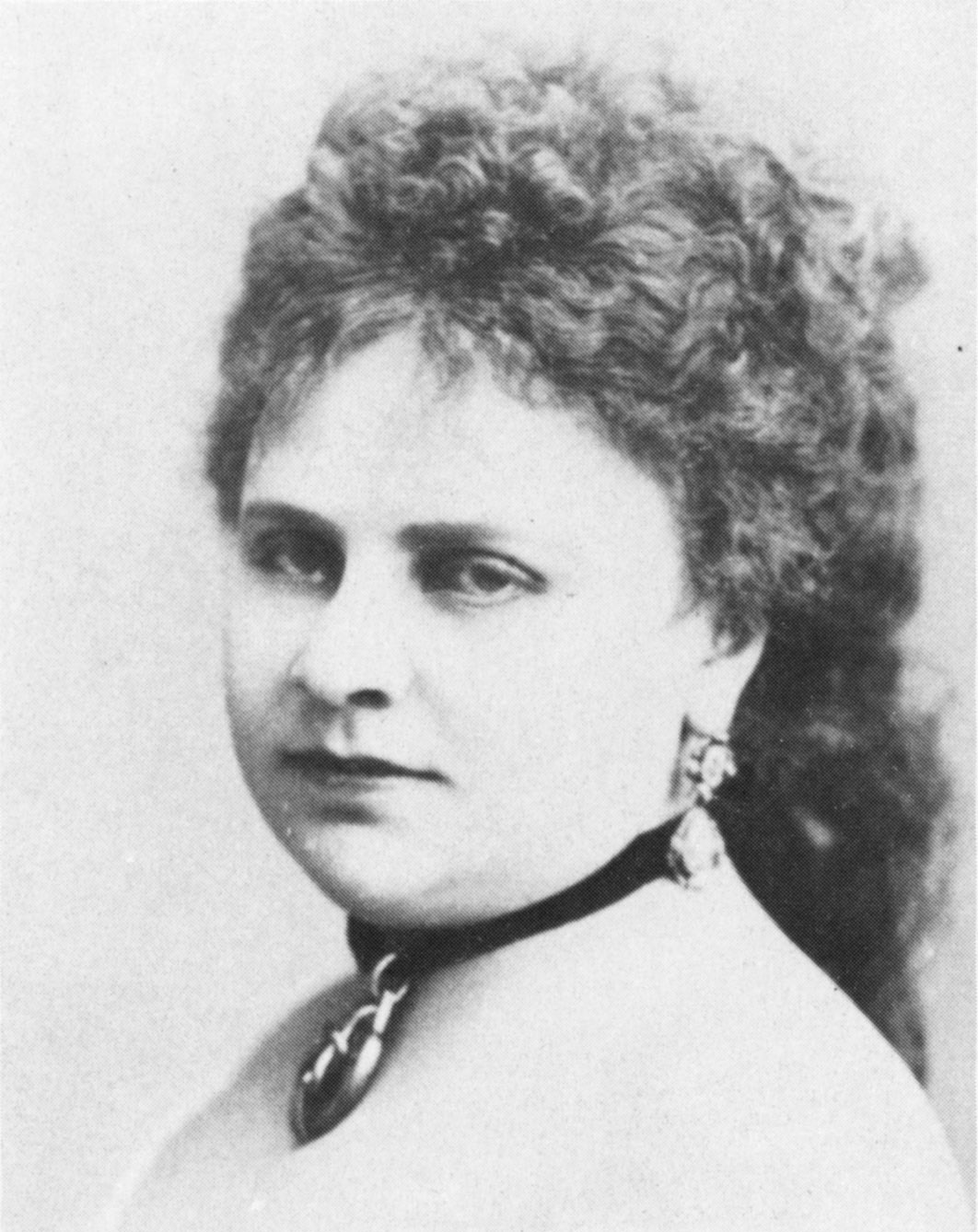
Guéymard-Lauters c.1865 by unknown photographer

Pauline Guéymard-Lauters (1 December 1834 – 10 May 1918) was a major opera singer in Paris in the 19th century, creating important soprano/mezzo-soprano roles at the Paris Opera. Her vocal range has been described as “a soprano of wide extension”.

== Life and career ==
Pauline Lauters was born in Brussels. She married the architect Deligne in 1853; her second marriage was to the leading tenor Louis Guéymard in 1858.

At the Paris Théâtre-Lyrique she sang under the name Deligne-Lauters. She sang the title role in Le Billet de Marguerite (premiere 7 October 1854), Annette (Agathe) in Robin des Bois (Freischutz) in 1855, and Margarita in Les Lavandières de Santarem (premiere 27 October 1855). At the end of 1855 she left the company for a concert tour of Brittany.

Her Paris Opera debut was on 12 January 1857 in the premiere of the revised French version of Verdi's Il Trovatore, Le Trouvère (Léonore). She also created the roles of Lilia in Herculanum (4 March 1859) by Félicien David, Laura in Pierre de Médicis (9 March 1860) by Prince Joseph Poniatowski, and Queen Balkis in La reine de Saba (28 February 1862) by Charles Gounod.

Among other roles in Paris, she sang Valentine in Les Huguenots, Gilda in La Mule de Pedro, Donna Elvira in Don Giovanni and Alde in Roland à Roncevaux.

Lauters created the role of Princess Eboli in Don Carlos on 11 March 1867 at the Paris Opera. The contralto Rosine Bloch had been the intended singer but Verdi was persuaded by Perrin to adapt and transpose the role for the older and higher singer, thus creating tessitura problems with which later singers have had to cope.

She also created Gertrude in Thomas's Hamlet in 1868 and Myrrha in La Coupe du roi de Thulé in 1873. After her retirement from the Opéra in 1876, she sang several times in Italian as Amneris in Verdi's Aida with the Théâtre-Italien at the Salle Ventadour.

== Gallery ==
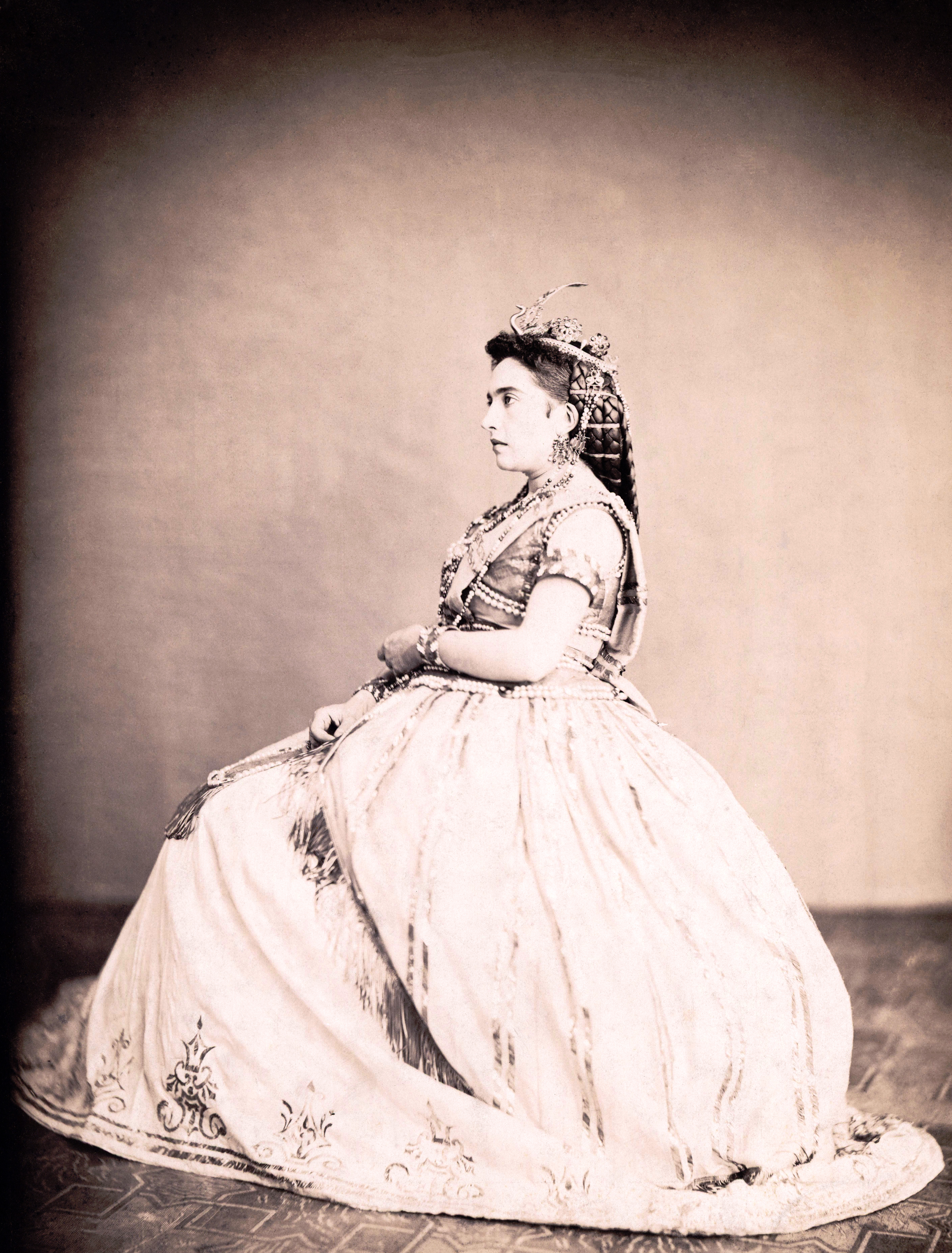
Pauline Guéymard as the Queen of Sheba in 1862

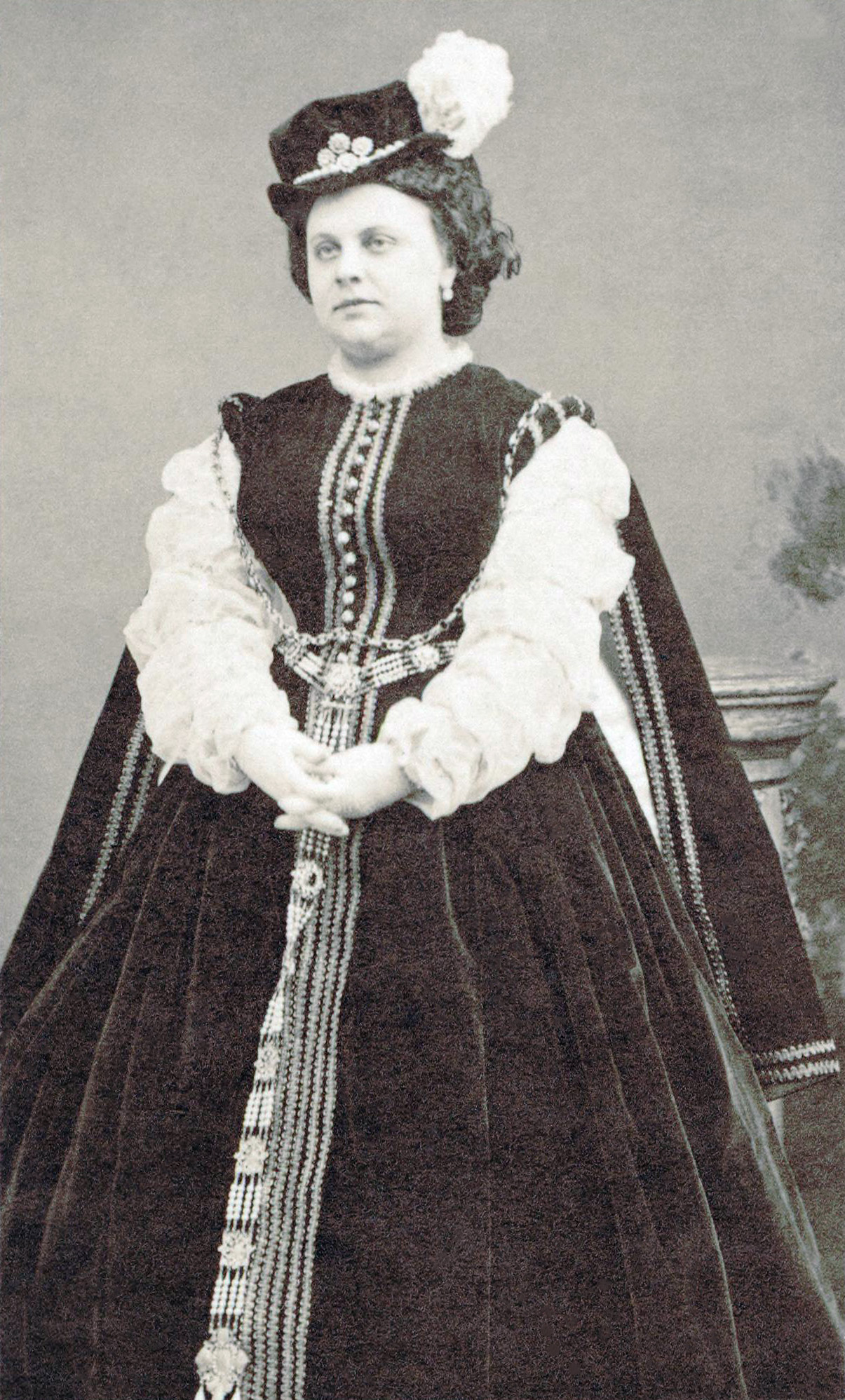
Probably as Valentine in Les Huguenots in 1864

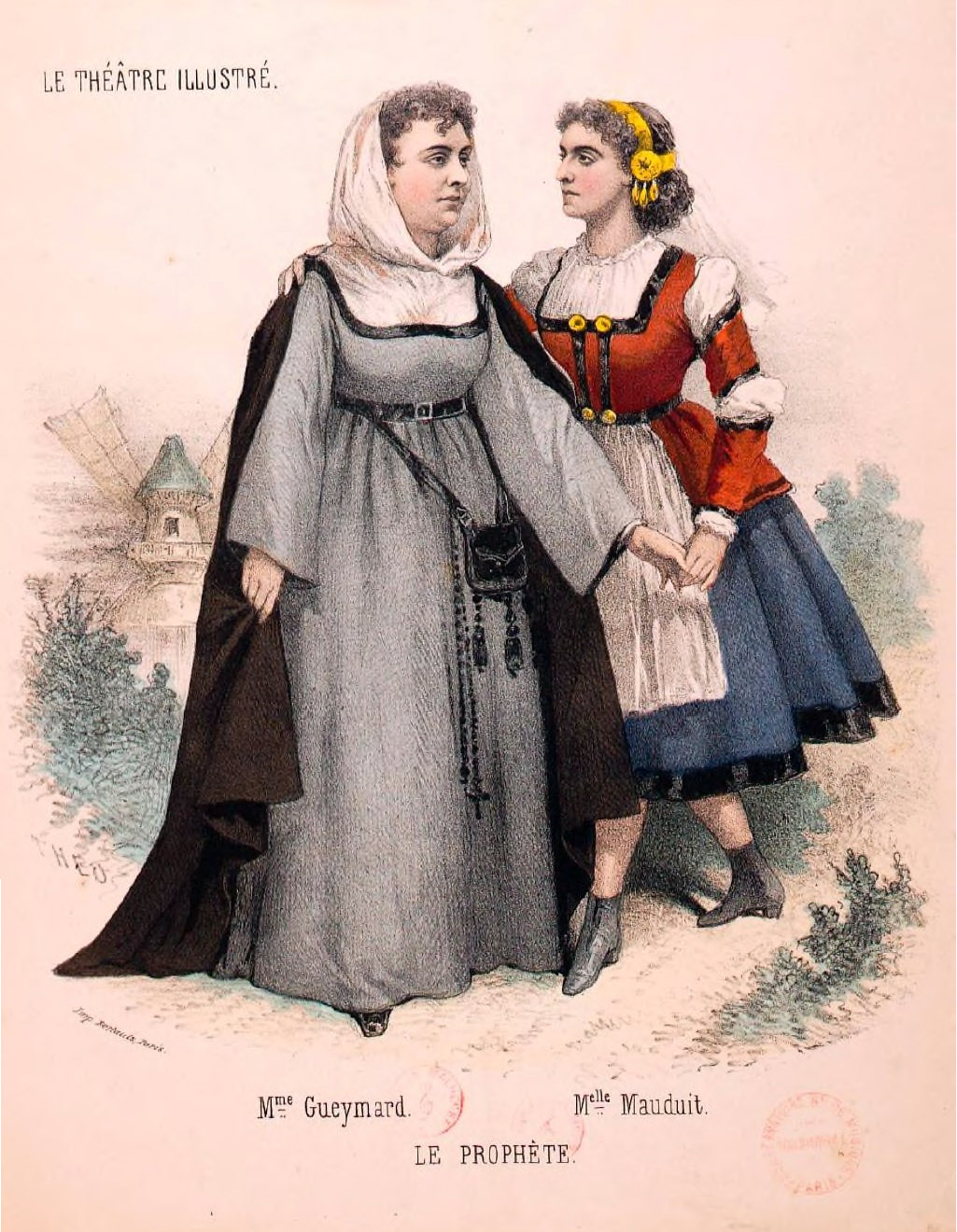
As Fidès in Le Prophète in 1866 (with Emma Mauduit as Berthe, on the right)

== Bibliography ==
- Pitou, Spire (1990). The Paris Opéra: An Encyclopedia of Operas, Ballets, Composers, and Performers. Growth and Grandeur, 1815–1914. New York: Greenwood Press. ISBN 9780313262180.
