= Louis Guéymard =

French operatic tenor (1822–1880)

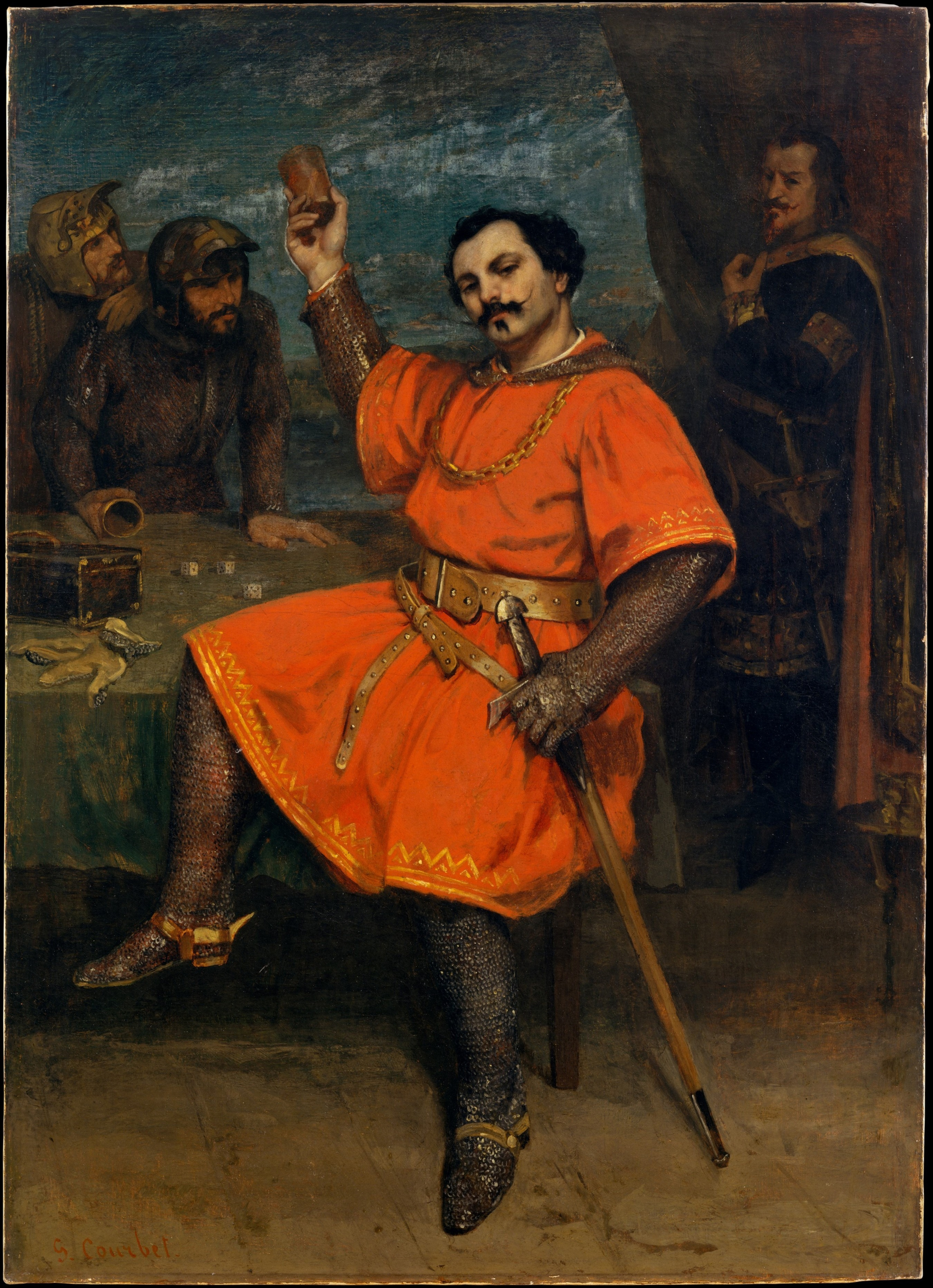
Portrait of Louis Guéymard as the title hero in Meyerbeer's Robert le diable. (Gustave Courbet, 1857)

Louis Guéymard (17 August 1822 – July 1880) was a French operatic tenor. Born in Chaponnay, his parents were farmers and he worked on his family's farm until the age of 19. He then received voice training at the Opéra National de Lyon. He made his opera debut there in 1845 and then pursued further voice studies at the Conservatoire de Paris from 1846–1848.

== Biography ==
In 1848 Guéymard became a leading tenor at the Paris Opera where he sang until 1868. He created roles in several world premieres with that company, including Philippe d'Autriche in Louis Clapisson's Jeanne la folle (1848), Jonas in Giacomo Meyerbeer's Le prophète (1849), Phaon in Charles Gounod's Sapho (1851), Rodolphe in Armand Limnander's Le maître chanteur (1853), Rodolphe in Gounod's La nonne sanglante (1854), Henri in Giuseppe Verdi's Les vêpres siciliennes (1855), Fromental Halévy's La magicienne (1858), Julien de Médicis in Józef Michał Poniatowski's Pierre de Médicis (1860), Adoniram in Gounod's La reine de Saba (1862), and Roland in Auguste Mermet's Roland à Roncevaux (1864).

On the international stage Guéymard was a guest artist at the Royal Opera House in London in 1854. He also appeared at the French Opera in New Orleans in the 1873–1874 season. Other roles in Guéymard's repertoire included Arnold in William Tell, Jean de Leyde in Le prophète, both Manrico and Ruiz in Il trovatore, Rodolfo in Luisa Miller, Tebaldo in I Capuleti e i Montecchi, and the title role in Robert le diable.

Guéymard married Belgian opera singer Pauline Guéymard-Lauters in 1858, but the marriage ended in divorce in 1868. He died in Corbeil-Essonnes at the age of 57.

== Gallery ==
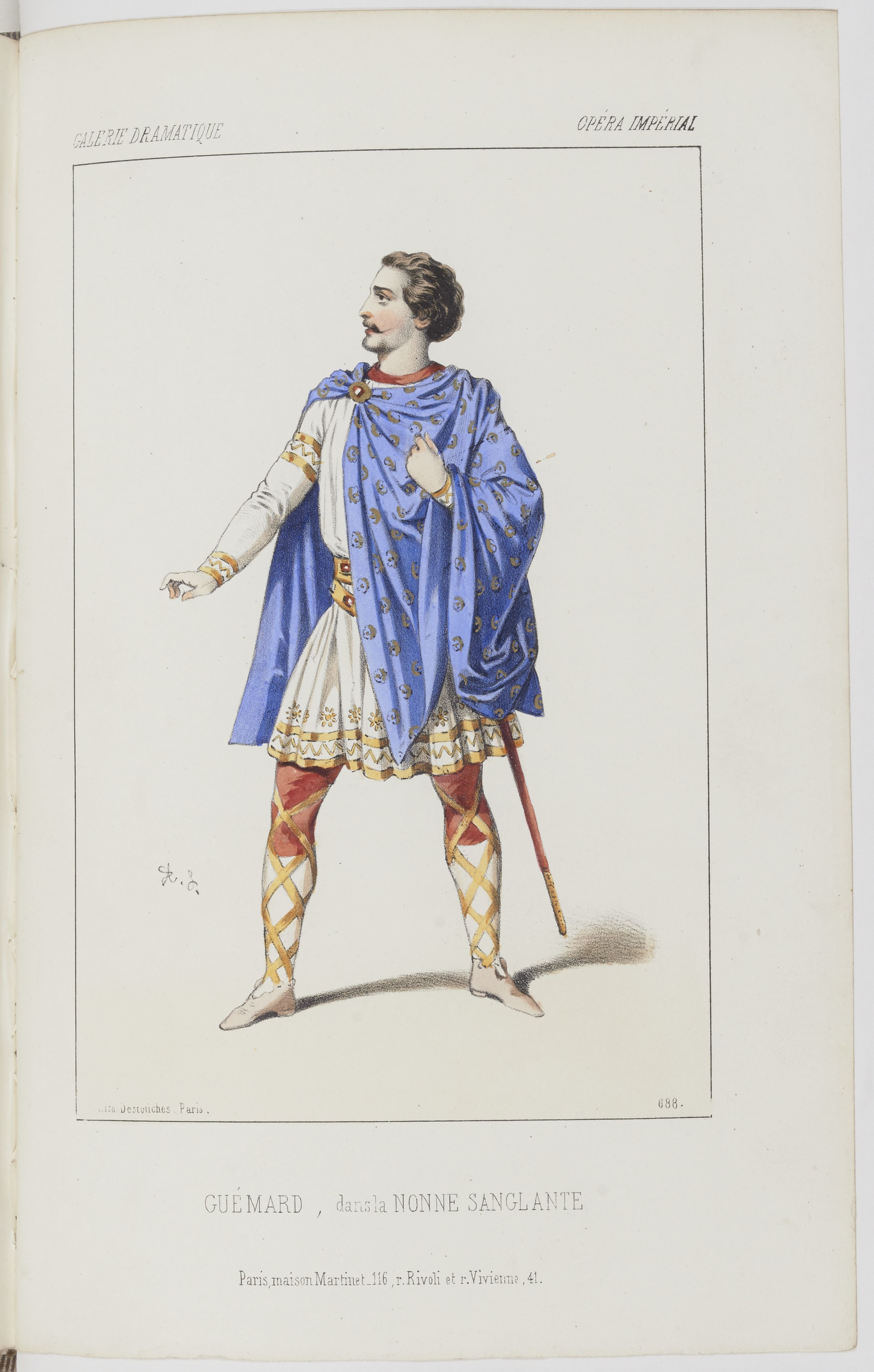
In The Bloody Nun
Drawing by Lacauchie
(1854)

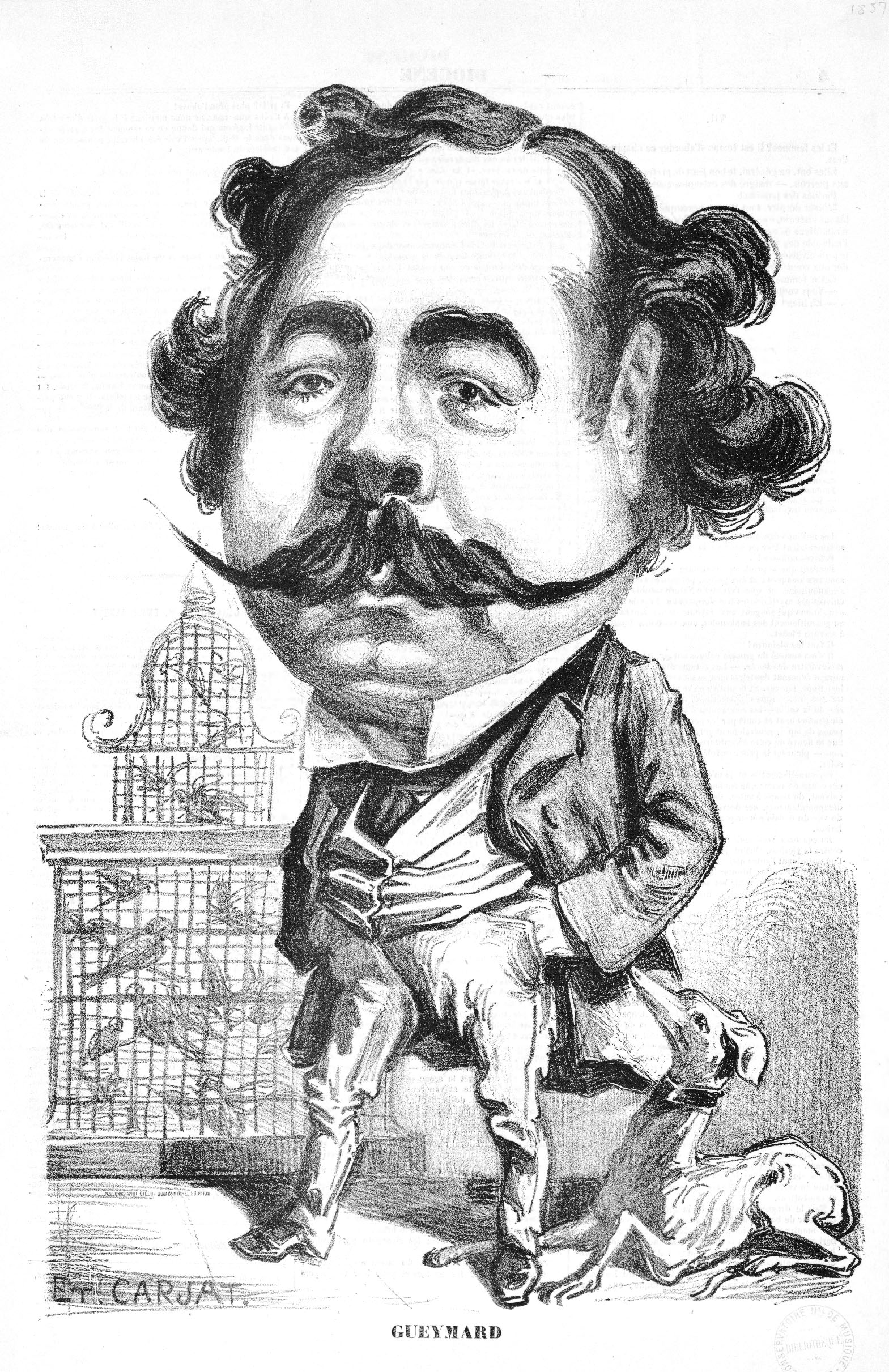
Caricature of Guéymard
by Étienne Carjat
(1857)

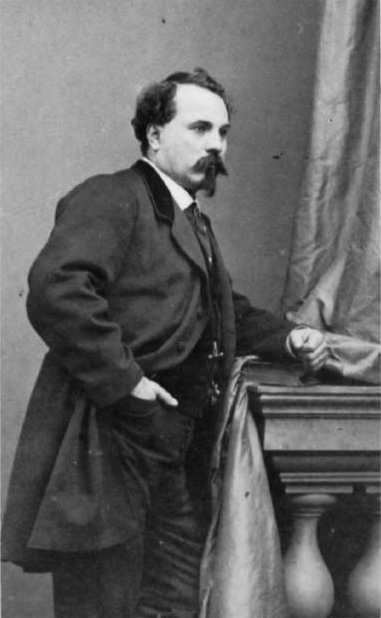
Photograph
by Disdéri
(1864)
