= Félicien David =

French composer (1810–1876)

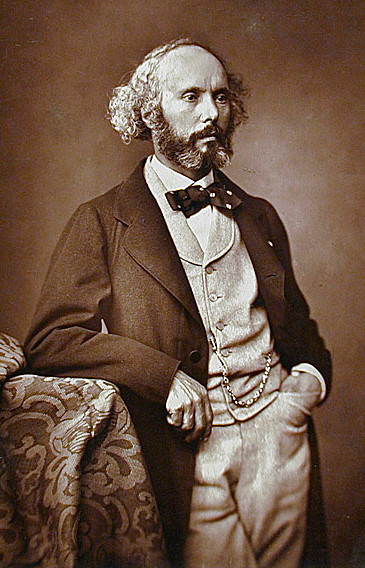
Woodburytype of Félicien David

Félicien-César David (13 April 1810 – 29 August 1876) was a French composer.

== Biography ==
Félicien David was born in Cadenet, and began to study music at the age of five under his father, whose death when the boy was six left him an impoverished orphan. His good voice enabled him to study as a choirboy at the Cathedral of Saint-Sauveur in Aix-en-Provence, which he left at the age of 15 with a sound knowledge of music, and a scholarship which enabled him to study literature at a Jesuit college. However, after three years, he abandoned these studies to pursue a musical career.

He first obtained a position in the orchestra of the theatre at Aix. In 1829, he became maître de chapelle at Saint-Sauveur, but realised that to complete his musical education he needed to study at Paris. An allowance of 50 francs per month from a rich uncle made this possible.

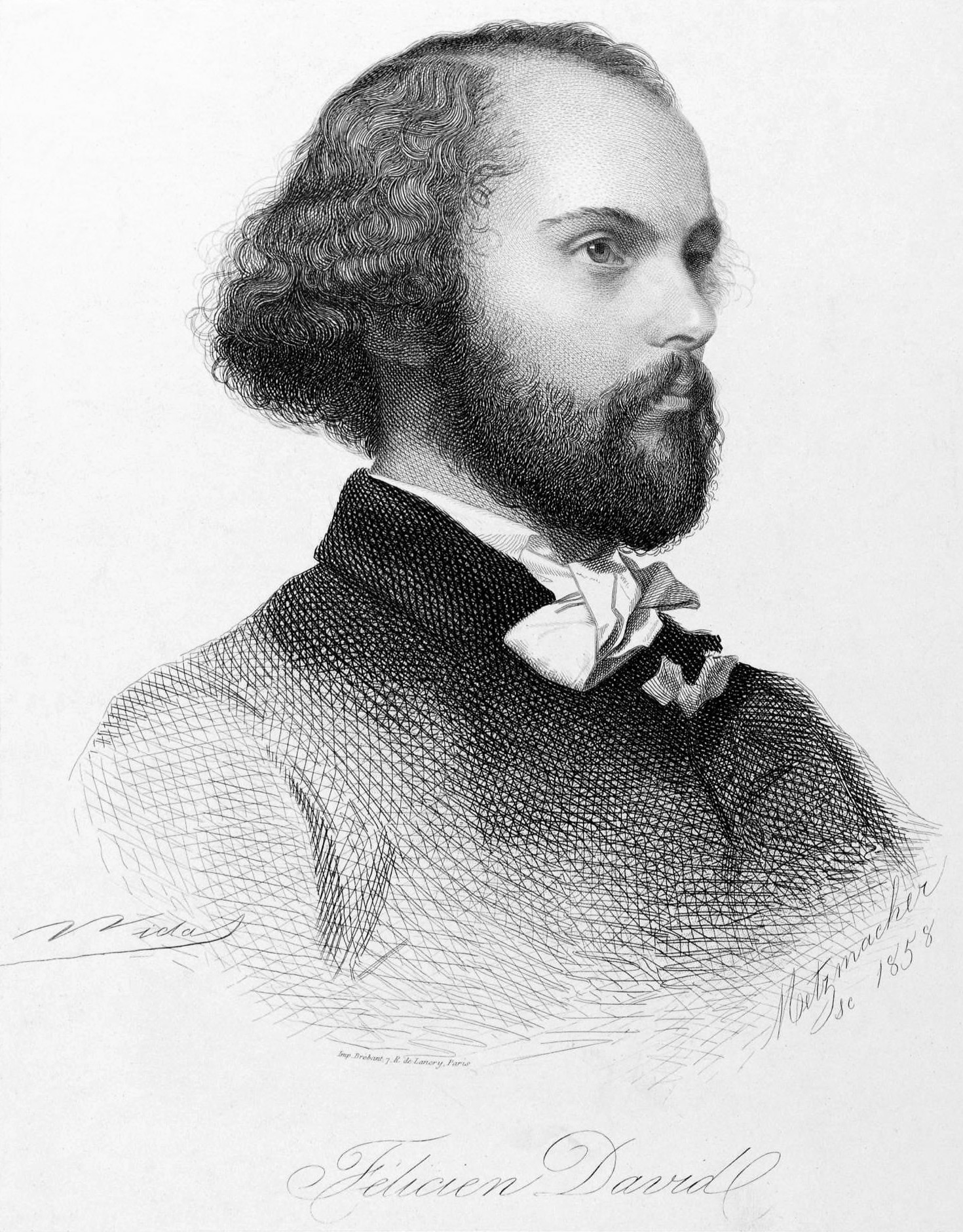
Félicien David in 1858

In Paris in 1830 he convinced Luigi Cherubini, the director of the Conservatoire, to enroll him as a pupil: despite his reservations, Cherubini recognised the talent shown by David's choral setting of Beatus vir. Despite the sudden withdrawal of his uncle's subsidy, David's studies, with Fétis and others, continued successfully.

On leaving the Conservatoire, David was caught up in the Saint-Simonian movement, for which he became a great enthusiast. The Saint-Simonians held music to be an important art, and David wrote much music for them, including a number of hymns. After the suppression of the movement in 1832, David joined with a number of adepts who visited the Middle East. This also proved a source of strong inspiration, leading eventually to his greatest success, the symphonic ode Le désert of 1844.

Returning to Paris in 1833, he wrote a number of romances, and instrumental music including three symphonies (in F major, E♭ major and C minor, composed in 1837, 1838 and 1849); by 1838/39 he was successful enough to be able to arrange public performances of his works. With Le désert he was acknowledged by the public and the critics as a significant force. The Revue et gazette musicale announced, the morning after its premiere, "A great composer has been born amongst us". To relieve his substantial debts, however, the composer sold the rights to his masterpiece for a relatively small sum.

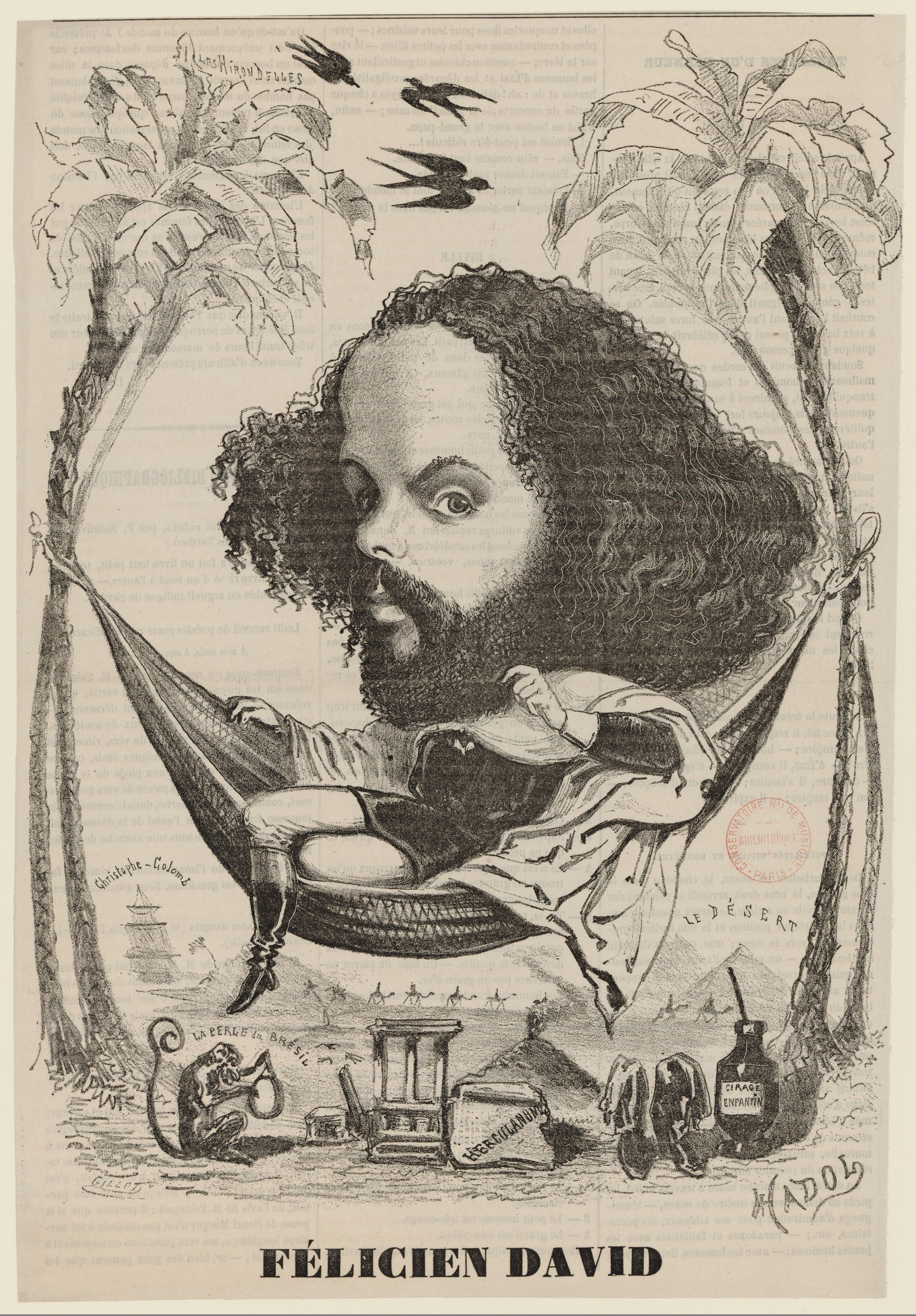
David in a Brazilian setting (a reference to his 1851 opéra comique, La perle du Brésil) surrounded by comic allusions to several of his major works, from an undated theatrical illustration (ca. 1860).

David wrote a number of operas, of which the most notable are Christophe Colomb (1847), La perle du Brésil (1851), Herculanum (1859), and Lalla-Roukh (1862). Amongst his oratorios are Moïse au Sinaï ('Moses on Sinai') (1846), and Eden (1848).

David became a member of the Légion d'honneur in 1862 and was given a civil pension. On the death of Berlioz in 1869, he took his place in the Institut de France. He died in Le Pecq (now Saint-Germain-en-Laye) in the département Yvelines, close to Paris, in 1876.

== Works ==
=== Instrumental ===
- Piano trio no. 1 in E♭ major
- Piano trio no. 2 in D minor
- Piano trio no. 3 in C minor
- Four string quartets
- Les Quatre Saisons: Soirées de Printemps / d'Été / d'Automne / d'Hiver (string quintet: two violins, viola, cello, double-bass)
- Nonet for brass in C minor, 1839 (4 horns, 2 trumpets, 2 trombones, tuba)
- Solo piano: Pensée (mélodie-valse), L'Absence (romance sans paroles), Rêverie, Le Soir (rêverie)
- 4 symphonies (for orchestra) (1837–1849)

=== Vocal ===
- Le désert (Ode-symphonie)
- Christoph Colomb (Ode-symphonie)
- Moïse au Sinaï, oratorio
- Eden, oratorio

La perle du Brésil: Charmant oiseau
This opera performance circa 1905 includes singing by Ruth Vincent with flute obligato by Albert Fransella (2:47).

La perle du Brésil: Charmant oiseau
This performance in 1917 includes singing by Amelita Galli-Curci with Clement Barone on flute, and Josef Pasternack conducting (4:09).

- La perle du Brésil, opéra comique in three acts (22 November 1851, Paris)
- Herculanum, opéra in four acts (4 March 1859, Paris)
- Lalla-Roukh, opéra comique in two acts (12 May 1862, Paris)
- Le Saphir, opéra comique in three acts (8 March 1865, Paris) on a libretto by Michel Carré, Adolphe de Leuven and Térence Hadot (18..-18..)
- La Captive, opéra comique in three acts (1883, Paris)
- Motets Pie Jesu / Miseremini / Alma redemptoris Mater (for Aix cathedral choir), O salutaris
