= La belle juive =

Archetype in European literature

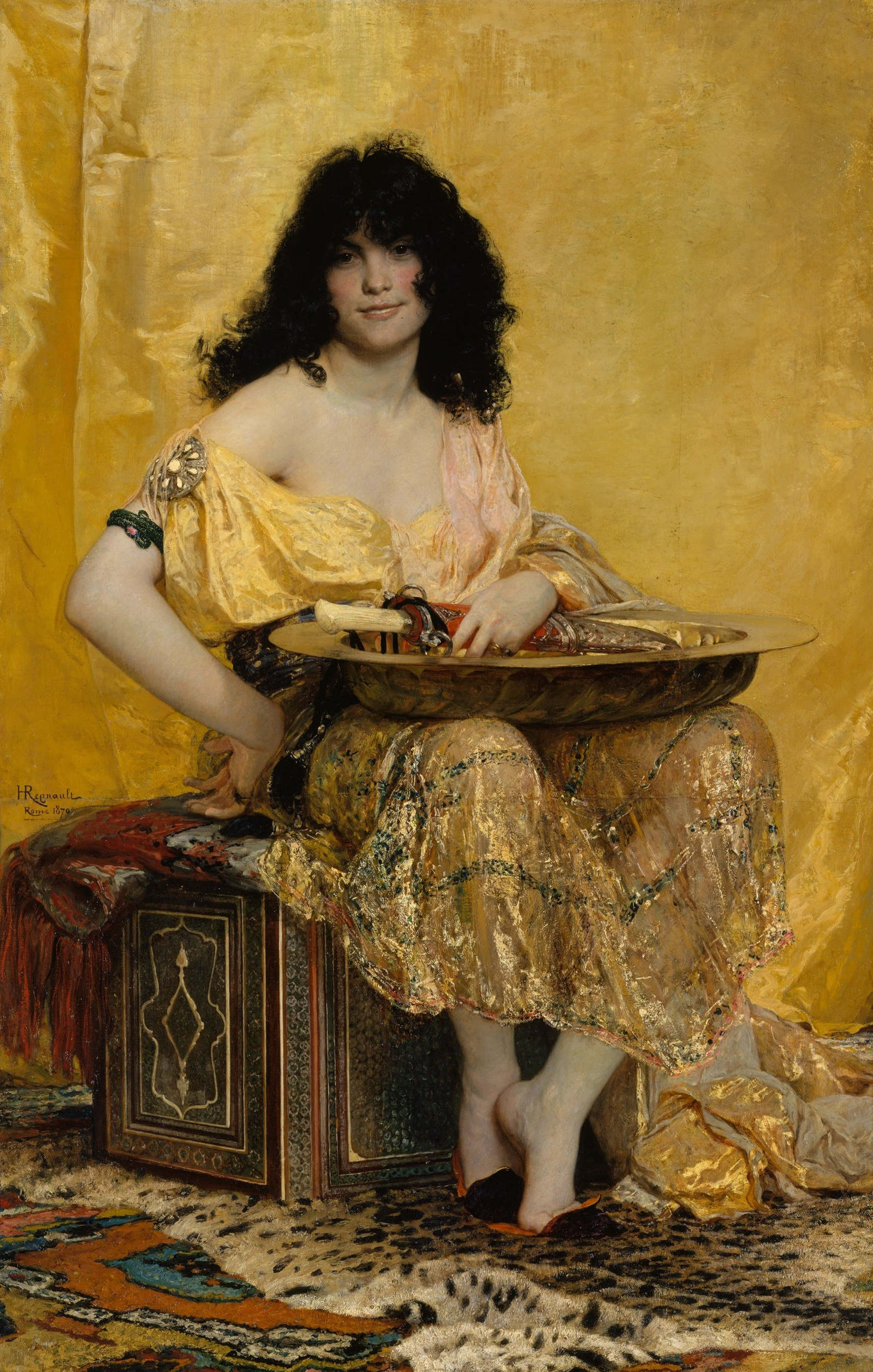
Salomé (1870) by Henri Regnault

La belle juive (French: [la bɛl ʒɥiv]; lit. 'the beautiful Jewess') is a recurrent motif with archetypal significance in Romanticism, most prevalent in 19th-century European literature. La belle juive is commonly portrayed as a lone, young, and beautiful Jewish woman in a predominantly Christian world.

== Historical background and themes ==
The origins of la belle juive date back to medieval literature. However, the archetype's full form as known today was established during the 19th century. The appearance of la belle juive is commonly deemed a manifestation of antisemitism on the part of the invoker, primarily because the archetype is commonly employed by non-Jewish artists and authors and is frequently accompanied by other expressions of antisemitic notions both on the part of the creator intended for consumption by antisemitic audiences. Britain, France and Germany are the three major countries where the archetype took roots and flourished in the cultural scene during the 19th and early 20th century.

La belle juive is shaped by her relations with adjacent characters, most commonly by a Christian love interest or a villainous Jewish father. There are two main categories of la belle juive; the first is "positive", and describes her as noble, intelligent, pure and loyal, perhaps linking her to the Virgin Mary, or to the general principle of Christian martyrdom. The second is overtly negative, describing her as sly, coquettish, overly sexual, dangerous and destructive. Their differences aside, both types serve the same purpose, as a distraction for the Christian hero. Appropriately, there are two acceptable fates for la belle juive; the first is total submission to the Christian lover and through him to the Christian world. The second is death. La belle juive is fundamentally a tragic heroine. As a positive character, she can never find true fulfillment in the Jewish world, perceived by those Christians as damned, and as a negative character, she never had had the opportunity, seeing as she was born in the Jewish world, to be anything other than damned.

== Examples ==
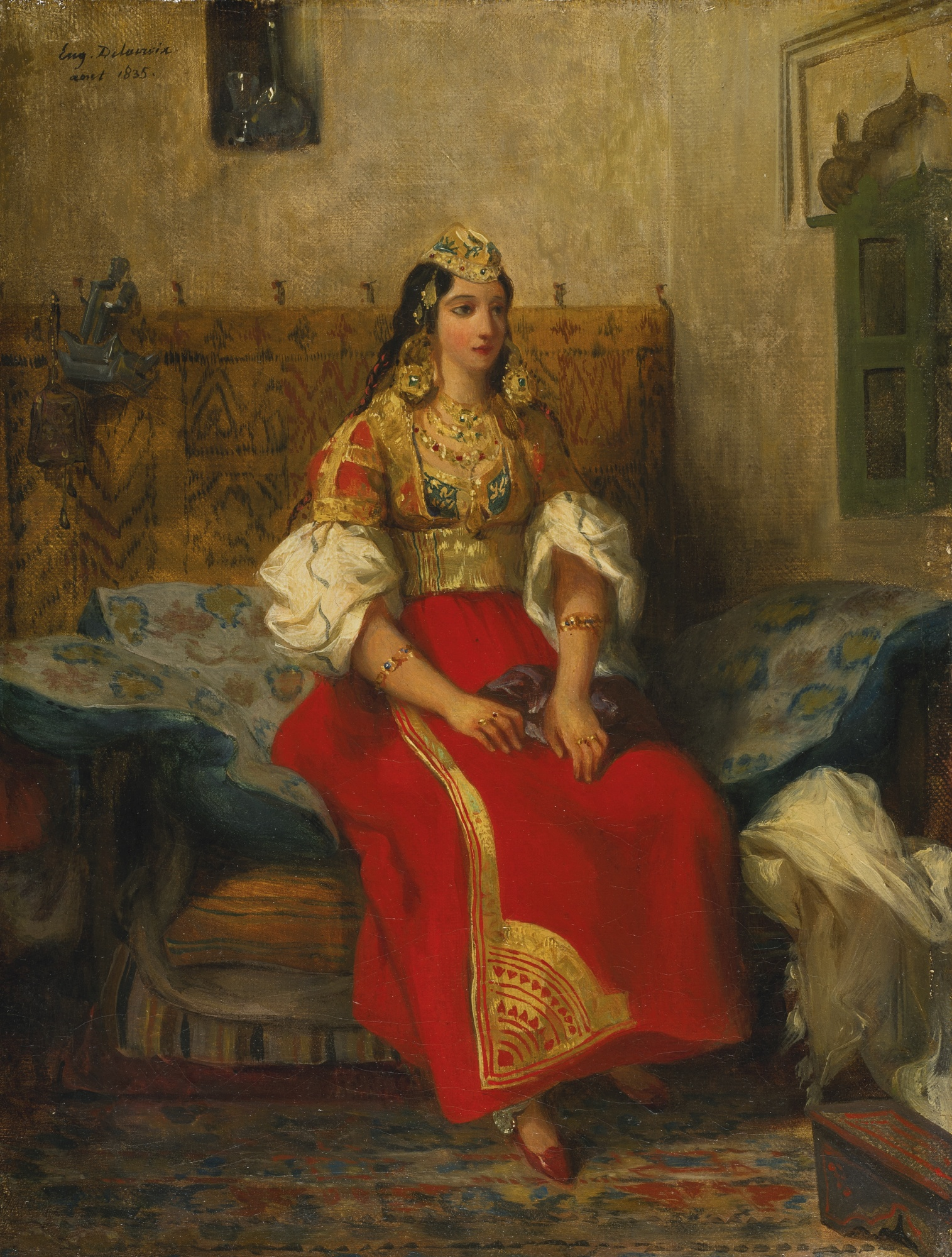
Juive de Tanger en costume d'apparat (1835) by Eugène Delacroix

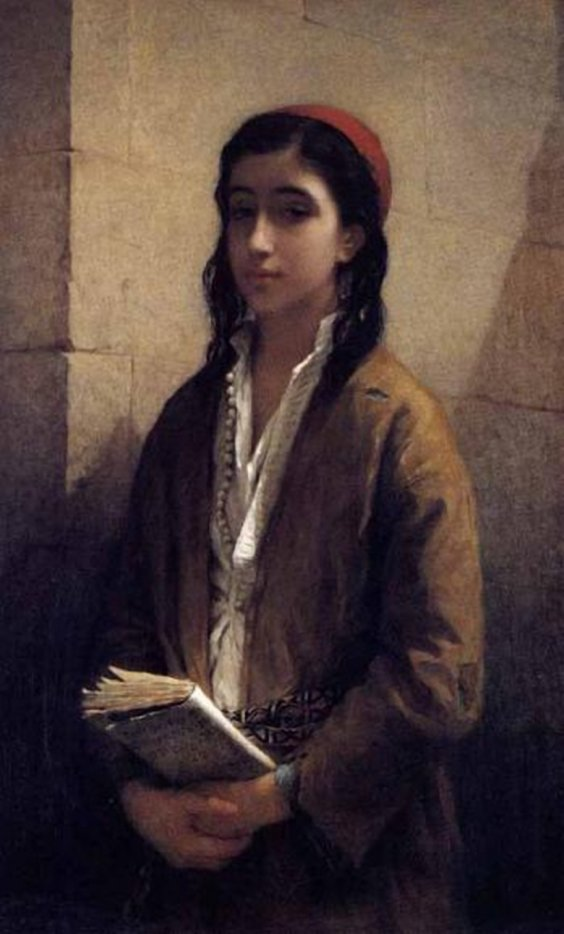
La belle Juive (1865) by Henriette Browne

Perhaps the most celebrated Jewish heroine was Rachel, in Jacques Halévy's grand opera La Juive (1835). Rachel falls in love with a Christian prince who disguises himself as a Jew to court her. When Rachel realizes the deception, she denounces him, damning herself. The cardinal promises her that she will be saved if she converts to Christianity. She refuses and is sent to her death in a cauldron of boiling water.

Another popular belle juive is Rebecca from Sir Walter Scott's novel Ivanhoe. Rebecca falls in love with the title character, but they cannot be together because he is Christian. She does not act on her feelings but instead sacrifices herself for her love. She takes care of Ivanhoe throughout the novel and is even gracious enough to give his future wife a fond farewell with her departure, intending to live as the Jewish equivalent of a nun.

Though virtually all of the literature about la belle juive is Western, the motif is also found in Eastern characters. A famous Eastern example of this archetype is Sol Hachuel, also known as Soleika. Sol, a Moroccan Jew, is accused by a Muslim neighbor of converting to Islam and then rejecting her newfound faith. Sol is sentenced to imprisonment, and then to death. The sultan tells her that she can be freed and rewarded with jewels and a husband if she converts, but she refuses. She is beheaded in the town square of Fez. Later, she became a martyr for both Jews and Muslims alike. Many Spanish and French poets penned her story in a romantic style, styling Sol as the archetypal belle juive.

One prominent example of the negatively portrayed belle juive is Salome. Originally a Biblical character, Salome is said to have danced seductively for King Herod, so that he would behead John the Baptist for her. She represents sexuality, foolishness, and danger. She has been the subject of many works of art, including Salome by Oscar Wilde and its opera adaptation by Richard Strauss, Salome. Both feature her dance for King Herod, called the Dance of the Seven Veils.

Among the many works of art depicting la belle juive, the most famous examples include Salome by Henri Regnault, Juive de Tanger en costume d'apparat by Eugène Delacroix, Tête de juive by Jean-Auguste-Dominique Ingres and La belle juive by Henriette Browne.

== Philosophical background ==
La belle juive has been argued to reveal antisemitism and misogyny on the part of the creator, for although the characters and the specific approaches to them varies with each appearance, the common thread shared by all is the Jewess's basic function as an erotic symbol of the other, the strange and the forbidden, who is singular in her vulnerability and damning seductiveness. In his essay "Jew and Anti-Semite" (1946), Jean-Paul Sartre writes:

There is in the phrase "a beautiful Jewess" a very special sexual signification, one quite different from that contained in the words "beautiful Rumanian", "beautiful Greek", or "beautiful American", for example. This phrase carries an aura of rape and massacre. The "beautiful Jewess" is she whom the Cossacks under the czar dragged by her hair through the streets of the burning village [...] Frequently violated or beaten, she sometimes succeeds in escaping dishonor by means of death, but that is a form of justice; and those who keep their virtue are docile servants or humiliated women in love with indifferent Christians who marry Aryan women. I think nothing more is needed to indicate the place the Jewess holds as a sexual symbol in folklore.

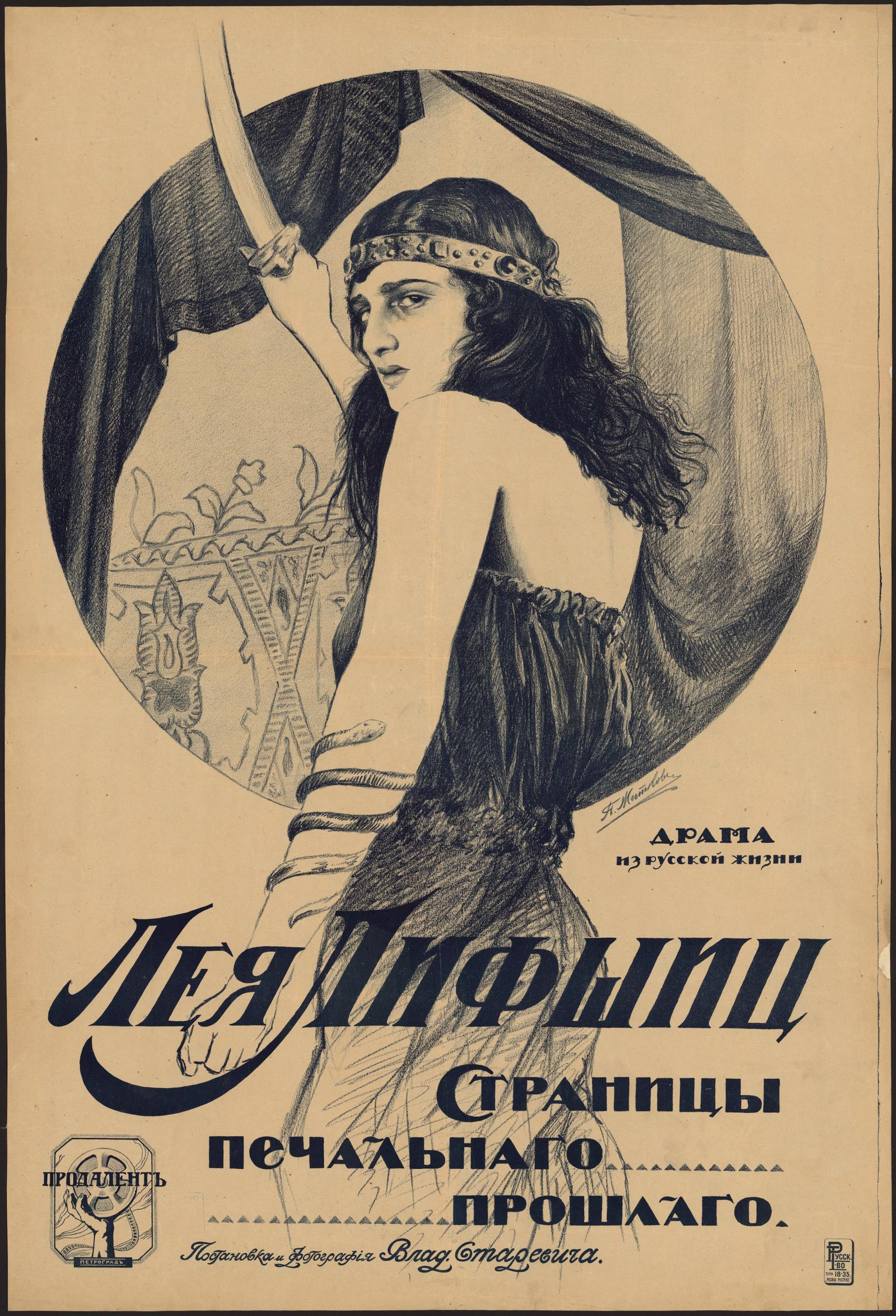
Modernist poster for a Russian movie called "Leya Lifshitz – Pages of the tragic past" (Note: Russian: Лея Лифшиц – Страницы печального прошлого) by Ladislas Starevich.

Furthermore, Anthony Bale in his essay "The Female 'Jewish' Libido in Medieval Culture" points specifically at the Christian–Jewish conflict as the source of the phenomena, remarking that:

The Jewess's body is a site of competing jurisdictions, Christian and Jewish, with the rivalry between men articulated through controlling the Jewess [...] the Jewish women is that which licenses an unsettling – but useful – alliance of sex and violence within normative codes of Christian conduct, an imaginary Jewish body for the self-regarding gratification of the Christian devotional body.

The trope of la belle juive has however also been used by authors sympathetic to the Jews and their plight. An example is the 1904 short novel Zhidovka (Russian: Жидовка) by the Russian author Alexander Kuprin, in which the poor living conditions of Jews in the Pale of Settlement are a main theme. In such a gloomy area the protagonist encounters a Jewess, whose indescribable biblical beauty is accentuated by the contrast with the surrounding grime and depression. He finds it nothing short of a miracle to find such a figure in this forsaken corner of the Pale. After extensively pondering on the miraculous survival of the Jewish people among all these near-mythological extinct civilizations, the ethnic Russian protagonist is brought back to himself:

Here stands this woman, on whose face a divine beauty is reflected, inspiring sacred rapture. For how many thousands of years must her people have refrained from mixing with anybody in order to preserve these amazing Biblical features? With the same smooth shawl on her head, with the same deep eyes and a sorrowful fold around her lips, they draw the mother of Jesus Christ. With the same irreproachable pure delight shone the gloomy Judith, the sweet Ruth, the tender Leah, the beautiful Rachel and Hagar and Sarah. Looking at her, you believe, feel and see just how these people go in their mind-darkening genealogy towards Moses, climb to Abraham, and higher and higher—directly to the great, terrible and vindictive biblical God!

== Physical attributes ==
The typical appearance of la belle juive includes long, thick, dark hair, large dark eyes, an olive skin tone, and a languid expression. Often, she is depicted wearing exotic oriental clothing and jewelry.

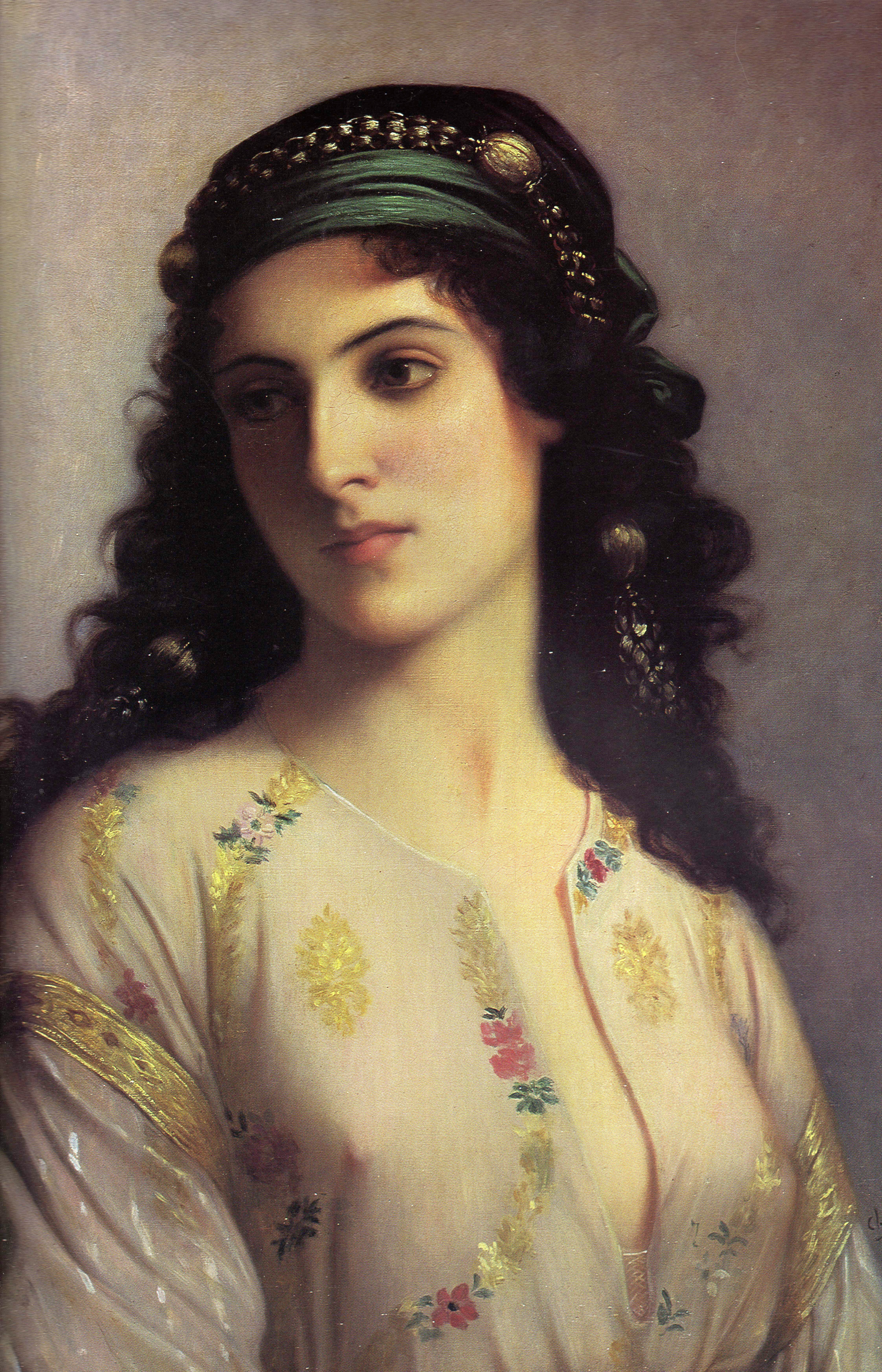
The Jewess of Tangier (before 1808) by Charles Landelle, showing a stereotypical belle juive

== See also ==
- Book of Judith, apocryphal/deuterocanonical book in the Bible, whose central character uses her beauty to deliver her city from foreign invasion.
- Orientalism, the imitation or depiction of Eastern culture
- Femme fatale, the archetype of a mysterious, beautiful, and seductive woman
  - Sol Hachuel, a Moroccan Jewish woman who was executed for alleged apostasy from Islam in 1834
  - Salome, a Jewish princess from the Herodian Kingdom of Judea
- Ivanhoe, an 1820 Scottish novel exploring divisions between Jews and local Christians
- Stereotypes of Jews, common contemporary and historical stereotypes of Jewish people
