= Marc Gotlieb =

American art historian

Marc Gotlieb is an American art historian who specializes in French Romantic art and Orientalist painting.

He received a B.A. in history from the University of Toronto in 1980 and an M.Phil. in international relations from Oxford University in 1982. In 1984, he earned his M.A. at Johns Hopkins University in Baltimore, MD, and in 1990 his Ph.D. from this university. For some years, he was Editor-in-chief of the prestigious art journal, The Art Bulletin. He also taught art history at the University of Toronto, where he chaired the Department of Fine Art. He is currently Director of the Graduate Program and Class of 1955 Memorial Professor of Art at Williams College, Williamstown, Massachusetts. He was the president of the National Committee for the History of Art from 2012-2016

He wrote The Plight of Emulation: Ernest Meissonier and French Salon Painting (1996) and several essays on French Romantic art, on the image of the artist, and on Orientalist painting. His more recent research centers on Henri Regnault and Orientalism and on Eugène Delacroix.

His graduate teaching encompasses nineteenth-century art, art historical methods and approaches, pedagogy in the visual arts, and related concerns.
