= Henriette Browne =

French painter

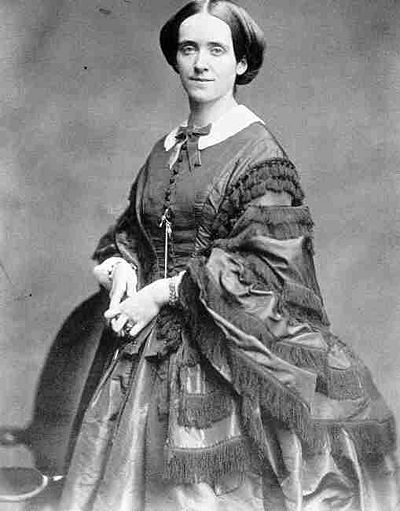
- Born: Sophie de Bouteiller; June 16, 1829; Paris, France
- Died: 1901 (aged 71–72); Paris, France
- Known for: Painting
- Movement: Orientalism
- Spouse: Henry Jules de Saux (m. 1853)

Sophie de Bouteiller (June 16, 1829 – 1901), known by her pseudonym Henriette Browne, was a French Orientalist painter.

Renowned internationally during her lifetime for her unconventional approach to Orientalism, Henriette Browne specialized in genre scenes that represented the Near East in a less sensationalized, albeit still exotic, manner than her contemporaries. Her sex, social position, and influence from her mother were pivotal to her development as an artist.

== Personal life ==
Sophie de Bouteiller was born in Paris on June 16, 1829, to the Comte de Bouteiller and his wife. Her father was an amateur musician and her mother an accomplished singer. Browne attained a privileged position in society because of her father, who descended from an old Breton Family. Sophie's mother was widowed at a young age prior to becoming the Comtesse de Bouteiller, and for a time gave music lesson to support herself and her son from this previous marriage. For this reason, the Countess encouraged Sophie to pursue an education in the arts from a young age: in the event that she have the need to economically sustain herself. She insisted that Sophie study music and drawing, and she was homeschooled by the Countess and other tutors in their Paris home. In 1849, Sophie decided to pursue more serious study in drawing by becoming a pupil of Monsieur Emile Perrin, who later became the director of Theater-Francais. In 1851, Sophie entered Monsieur Charles Joshua Chaplin’s class for female artists. Here she had the opportunity to study from live models, gaining indispensable knowledge on the depiction of body proportions and movements.

Between 1851 and 1853, Sophie adopted the pseudonym Henriette Browne, the name of her maternal grandmother. In 1853, under her newly chosen pseudonym, Browne submitted her first work to the Paris Salon, where she exhibited regularly until 1878, the year before her husband's death. With this pseudonym, Browne sought to keep her professional and personal life separate. Furthermore, by distancing herself from her artistic career, Browne wished to preserve her social standing, as it was not deemed appropriate at the time for a lady to also be a professional artist.

Henriette Browne married Monsieur Henry Jules de Saux, a French diplomat and secretary of Count Walewski, in 1853. Browne accompanied her husband on the many trips that his job required, traveling extensively to places such as Italy, Holland and Constantinople. These voyages proved to be vital to her artistic formation, exposing Browne to new environments. The trip to Constantinople was of particular importance, as it was during this trip that she visited a Turkish harem, gaining firsthand experience on what this private space was truly like. It is believed that this experience contributed to the unique manner in which she would later portray the Orient in her paintings and engravings.

By 1879 Browne had largely given up exhibiting, and could look back upon a productive career as an internationally sought genre and Orientalist artist. She became an honorary member of London's Royal Institute of Painters in Watercolours in 1894. Henriette Browne had a successful career as an artist and although many of her works are untraced, the surviving works in private collections testify to her popularity. Today, her paintings offer an intervention into the type of 19th century Orientalism that largely catered to and reaffirmed the status of the dominating male gaze. She died in 1901 in Paris.

== Early career and work ==
Browne's early work consisted of portraiture, domestic genre scenes, and French religieuse. Her capacity for realism was evident at the beginning of her career. Browne was a naturalistic artist, who had a reputation for painting from observable fact. She became known for her boldness with which she depicted genre scenes. Their scale, realism, and frontal figure presentation were unusual characteristics for the time.

Browne first appeared at the Paris Salon of 1853. She exhibited Lecture de la Bible, a painting of an old woman reading a heavy Bible on her lap. She received moderate success and drew the attention of an art critic who was well known in both French and English art circles. After striking up a rapport with Browne, he was invited to her studio to view more of her work. The visitor was immediately able to discern that her Parisian studio was adorned with a level of taste and luxury that did not equate to the sale of her artworks, which at that time were selling for around 500 francs. After witnessing her skill, the collector decided to purchase the works he has previously discussed as well as the promise to purchase more works in the future. He then submitted these works and others to future Salons which accrued around 7,000 francs.

She next exhibited at the Exposition Universelle in 1855, where she immediately became a success. All five of her paintings were sold including Ecole de Pauvres a Aix purchased by Emperor Napoleon. The art dealer Ernest Gambart saw her work at the Exposition and promoted her at the French Gallery in London. From 1857 to 1859, Browne received more success. Empress Eugenie bought her work Les Puritaines for 6,000 francs from her five exhibited paintings in 1859. One of her other five contributions that year, Les Soeurs de Charité, was particularly successful and won her a third class medal. Les Soeurs de Charité was a large painting portraying two nuns tending a sick child. The work caused a sensation only second to Rosa Bonheur's paintings and was purchased for 12,000 francs. Charles Kingsley described the painting as a perfect combination of realism and naturalism. Also in 1859, an exhibition of her work was held at the French Gallery in Pall Mall. The exhibition was well reviewed with the principal characteristic of her work being “realistic simplicity”. As opposed to Rosa Bonheur, Browne was viewed as a model of femininity and her paintings as expressions of womanly virtue.

Many of her early genre scenes focused on the subjects of religion and/or children. Her early works often contained themes of pathos and sentiment. There were three other key characteristics to her paintings. First, her paintings were often extremely large for genre scenes and her figures were placed toward the front of the picture. Second, certain aspects recalled elements of Dutch art from the 17th century. These aspects included her division of the receding plane and the centralization of light in her interiors. Lastly, her work contained realism. While her paintings were creations of her mind, all the elements and details were borrowed from real life. One review of her work in Woman's English Journal stated “she observes, combines, and reproduces…every detail is copied from Nature”.

Additionally, Browne was a professional engraver. She was the first to make steel engravings of Alexandre Bida’s work, which consisted of Eastern and scriptural drawings. She took the liberty of making alterations in her copies, such as removing objects, lightening the clothing, and “Orientalizing” the scene.

== Orientalism ==
The nineteenth century saw a dramatic increase in Orientalist fascination, particularly in France and Great Britain. Henriette Browne exhibited numerous Orientalist paintings in the 1860s, and during this period, enjoyed a time of travel and success. In 1862, she was one of three women listed as founder-members of the Société Nationale des Beaux-Arts in Paris. Browne traveled to Turkey in 1860, Morocco in 1864, and Egypt and Syria during the winter of 1868-1869. During these travels, which were enabled by diplomatic and royal connections, Browne focused her art on more Eastern subjects, especially school scenes. Her first Orientalist subjects exploded onto the French art scene in 1861, when she exhibited two paintings at the Paris Salon: Une Visite and Une Joueuse de Flute. These two paintings, possibly Browne's most famous works, are progressive paintings of the Oriental harem in Constantinople. In these images, women greet visitors and listen to music. They are shown performing everyday activities as opposed to being undressed, smoking, or catering to men. After these paintings, Browne turned her attention largely to the subjects of schools and children, in the Orientalist fashion. By the 1870s, her reputation was well established and she was given a distinguished position among Orientalist painters. Henriette Browne's work would soon become a touchstone for all subsequent female Orientalist painters.

Henriette Browne was most famous for her subjects of Eastern harems and convents. In her paintings, the harem is shown as a space for social interaction among women as opposed to a space of sexual pleasure for men. She represented female labor, sexuality, and space, and prioritized the female gaze. Because of her female gender, Browne was able to personally interact with the Eastern harem and its inhabitants, witness the gender politics that governed the harem, and depict the interaction among women in the harem that other male artists could not. Representations of the Eastern harem by male artists were largely based on fantasy as men could not enter these womanly spaces, therefore their sexuality was exaggerated to conform to male fantasies. Her ability to visit a harem allowed her to paint harem scenes differently than men. She does not objectify the women, but rather presents a calm and controlled domestic space, excluded men from the scenes, and painted with a more subdued color palette (Inge 13). Browne's greatest contribution was that she debunked cultural and sexual myths about the harem as she desexualized and domesticated the site. Browne's paintings were uncontroversial in terms of style and were truthful representations of female community that broke with male Orientalist tradition.

== Reception of work ==
Browne's paintings had popular appeal. Her work fetched high prices and attracted influential patrons such as Emperor Napoleon III and Empress Eugénie in the 1850s. Her paintings were well received in Britain and France, although her genre scenes had greater importance in Britain and her Orientalist paintings held higher praise in France. Browne's works were celebrated, as they broke with the male Orientalist tradition but were also uncontroversial in terms of style. The artist's reputation among critics as a serious artist was never under threat.

=== Britain ===
Browne's early genre scenes of nuns and children were exceedingly popular in Britain despite the widespread anti-Romanism at the time. After its success at the Paris Salon of 1859, her painting Les Soeurs de Charité was shown in London, where it was identified as a masterpiece. The painting commenced her successful reputation in Britain. The English liked the painting especially for its strong moral message; it showed extreme pathos and sentiment, which allowed the viewer to feel sympathetic as these nuns care for a child. In reference to this painting, Charles Kingsley upheld her technique as one between idealists and realists. He commented on her paintings’ realist style and feminine vision. To him and other English art enthusiasts, a person who can paint scenes of moral value must be of good moral stature him or herself. It was not about her gender, but rather her technique and the moral content of her works. The article on Browne in the English Woman's Journal in 1860 further enhanced her reputation. The article portrayed Browne as a professional artist and a good wife and mother. It stressed her position as a diplomat's wife without compromising her aptitude and attentiveness as an artist. The article also went into further detail on her paintings. In 1859, she also had her own exhibition at the French Gallery in Pall Mall owned by Gambart, who continued to exhibit her work years after. By 1860, at least eight of her works had been purchased by the English.

The British interest in her genre paintings far exceeded the interest in her Orientalist works. While Orientalist subjects were popular in Britain, the British tradition of Orientalism was more typified by archeological landscapes and topographical paintings compared to French Orientalist paintings. Therefore, only a moderate interest was expressed in Britain for her Orientalist paintings.

=== France ===
Browne became well established in France as well. In 1855, she exhibited five works at the Exposition Universelle, all of which were sold. In 1855 and 1857 Browne was awarded third-class medals for painting at the Paris Salon. While her early paintings proved to be highly successful and were well received and established her as an artist, they weren't significant enough to allow her to excel in the genre of French religious painting.

Her later fame was more closely attributed to her Orientalist paintings. Browne's first Orientalist subjects exploded onto the French art scene in 1861. The two paintings called Interiors immediately received critical coverage. This was the first and last time she painted this type of scene. After these two paintings, she continued to produce Orientalist subjects of children, schools, scholars, and individuals of Oriental society. Her Orientalist paintings continued to be popular in France throughout her lifetime.

== Selected works ==
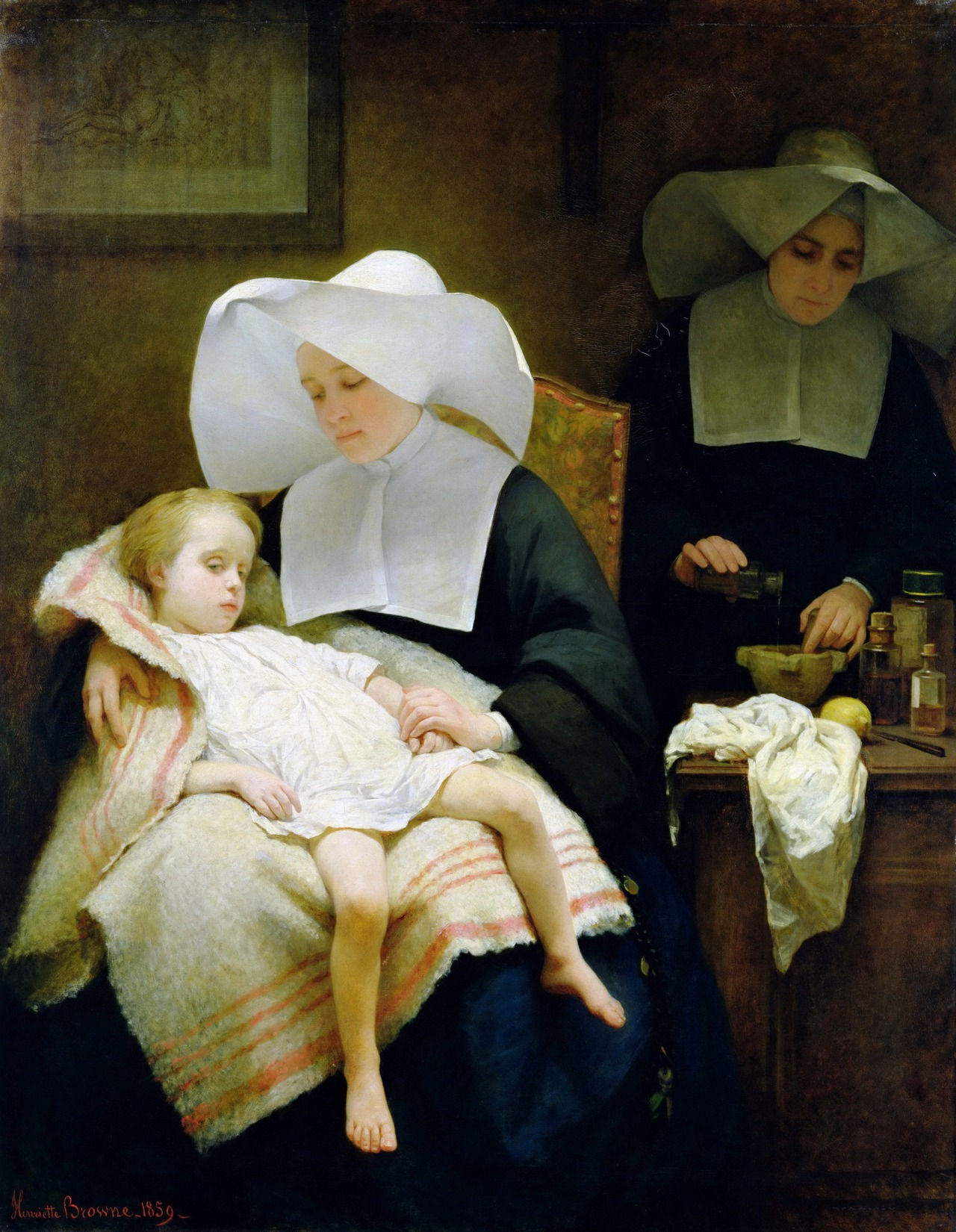
The Sisters of Mercy (1859)

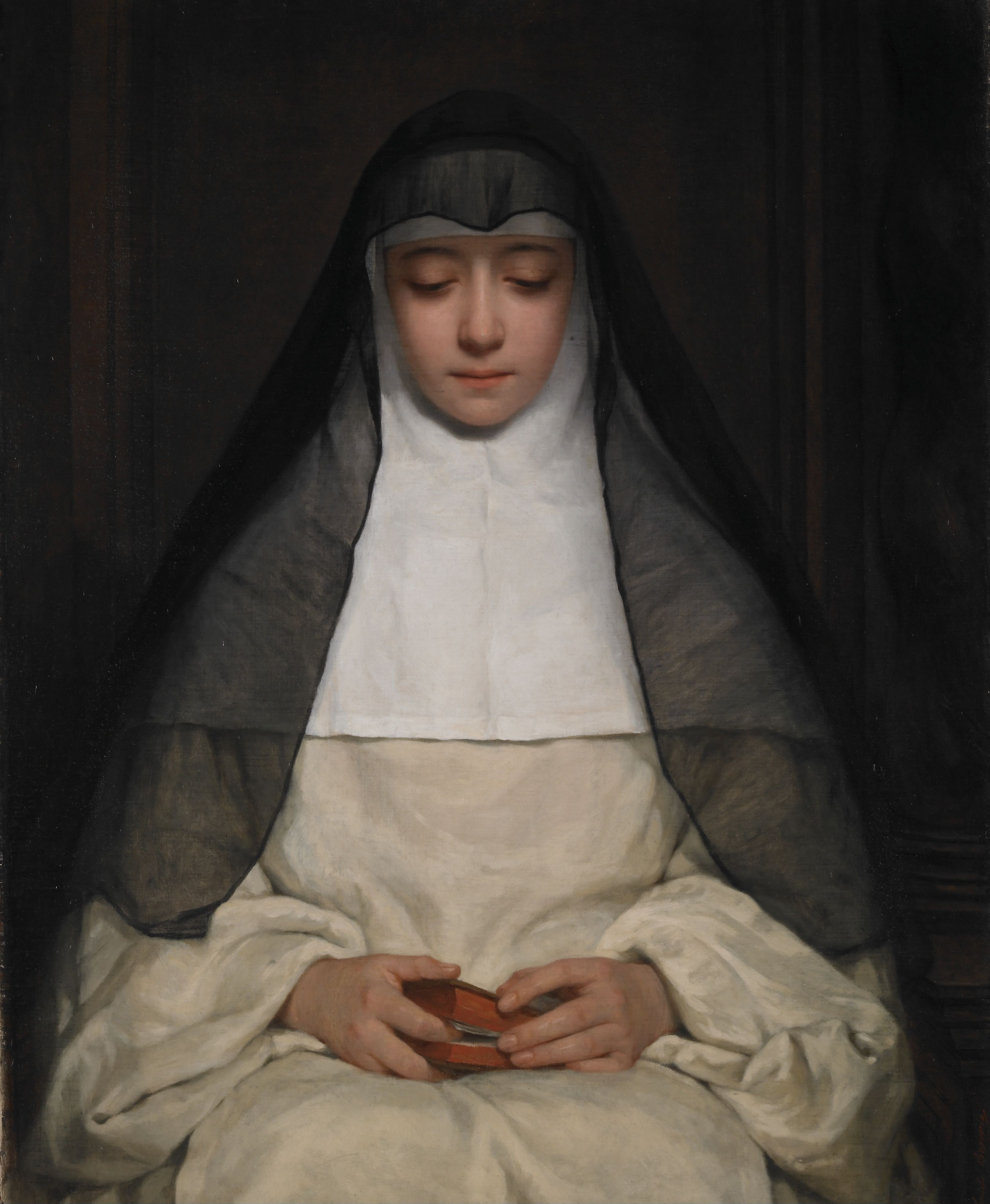
La religieuse (1859), National Museums Liverpool

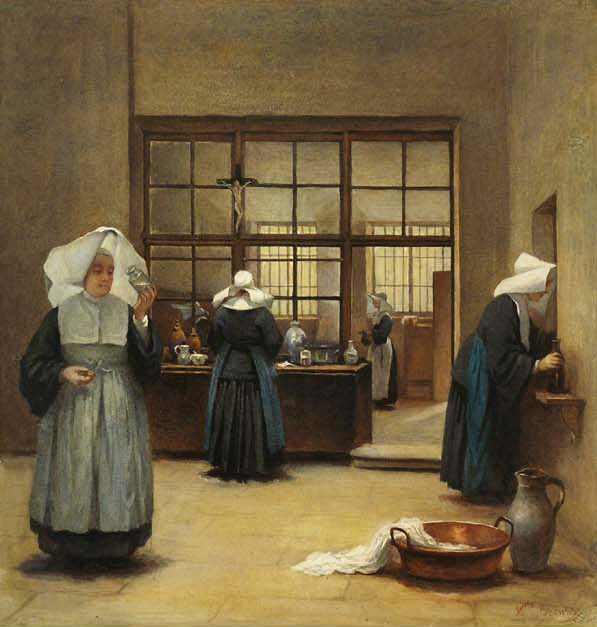
Religieuses au travail dans un couvent

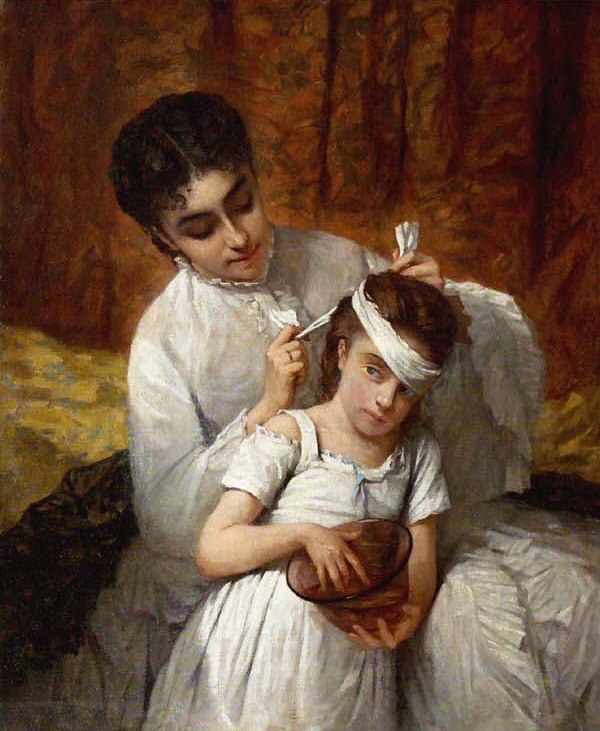
La mère et l'enfant

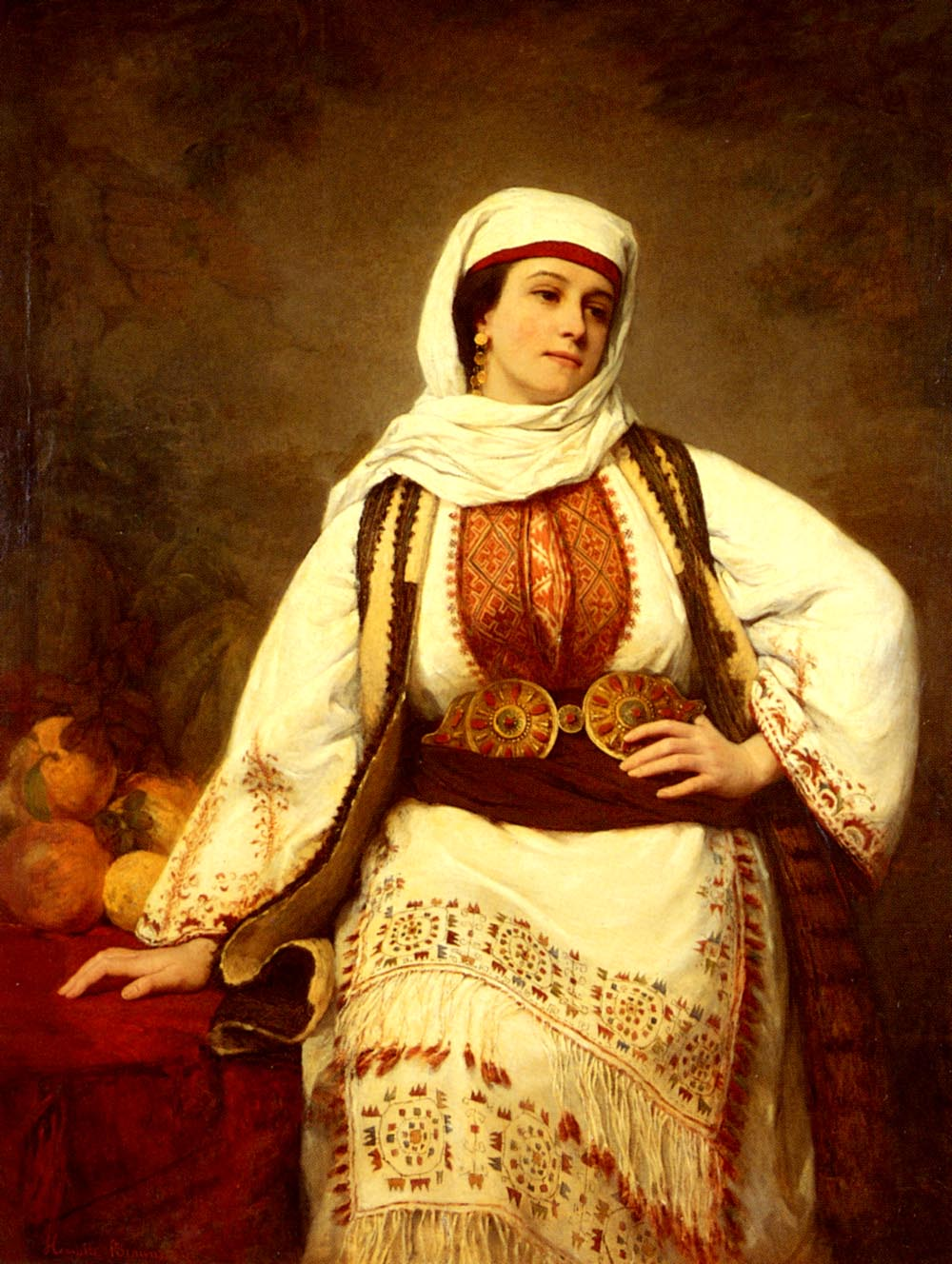
Une beauté orientale (1861), private collection

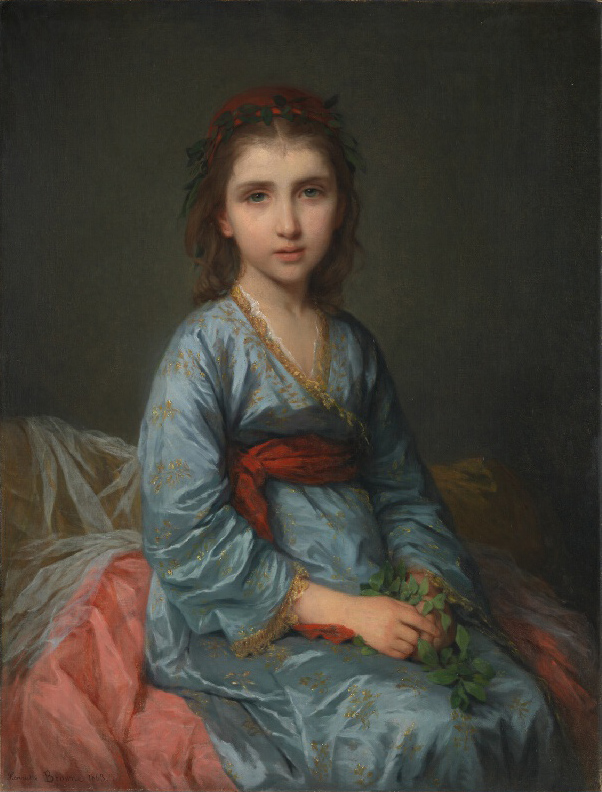
La captive grecque (1863), National Gallery

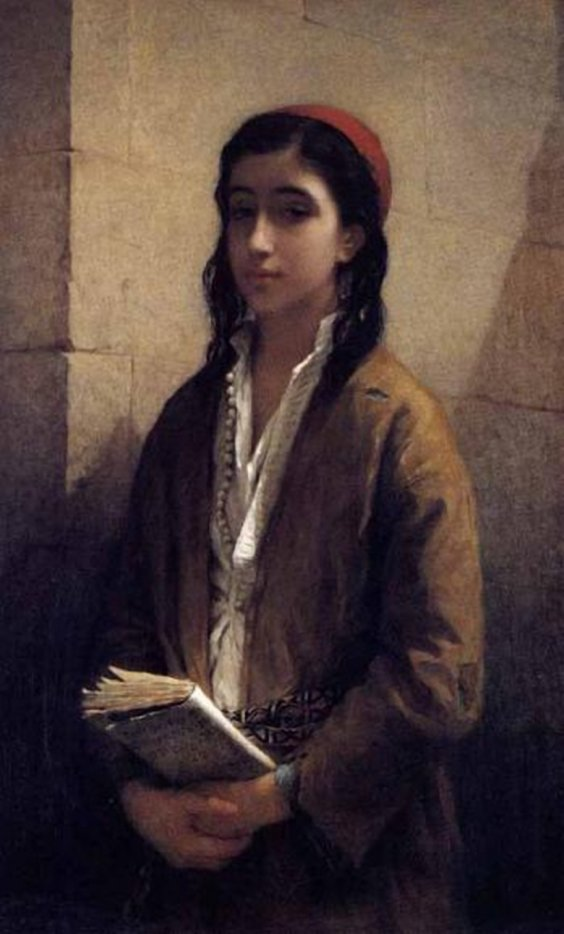
La belle Juive (1865)

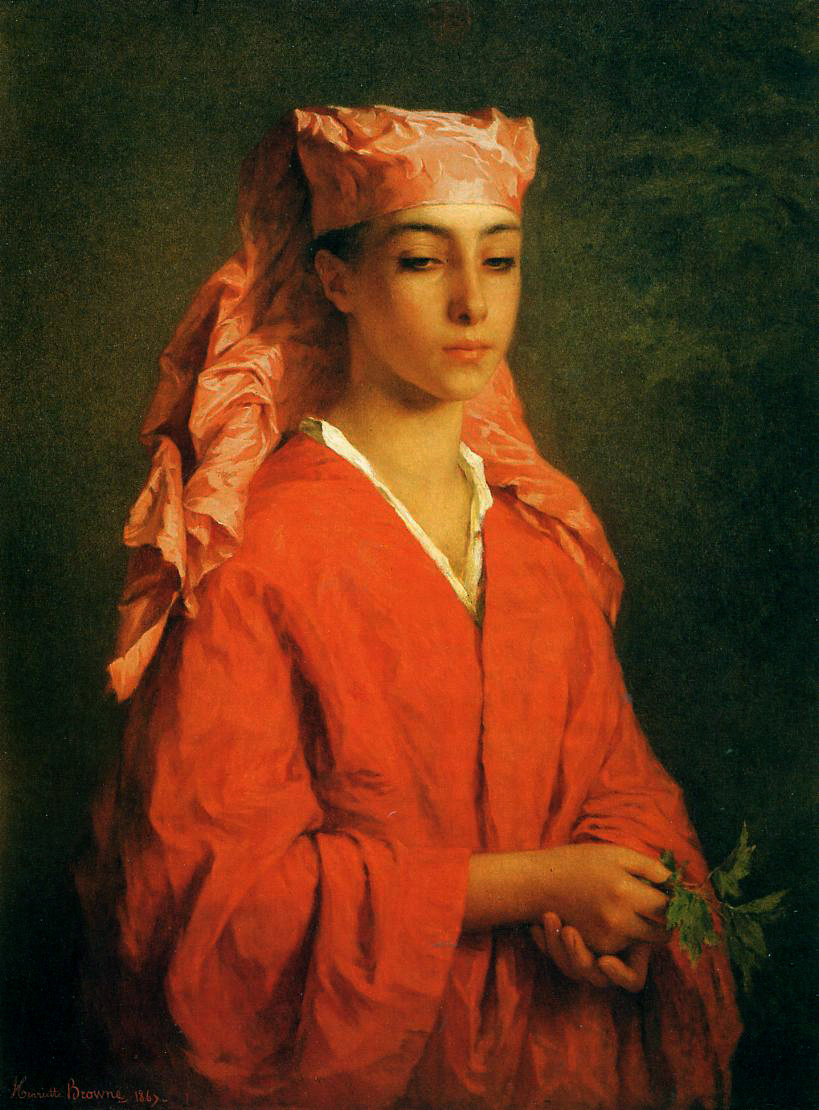
Fellah nord africaine (1867), private collection

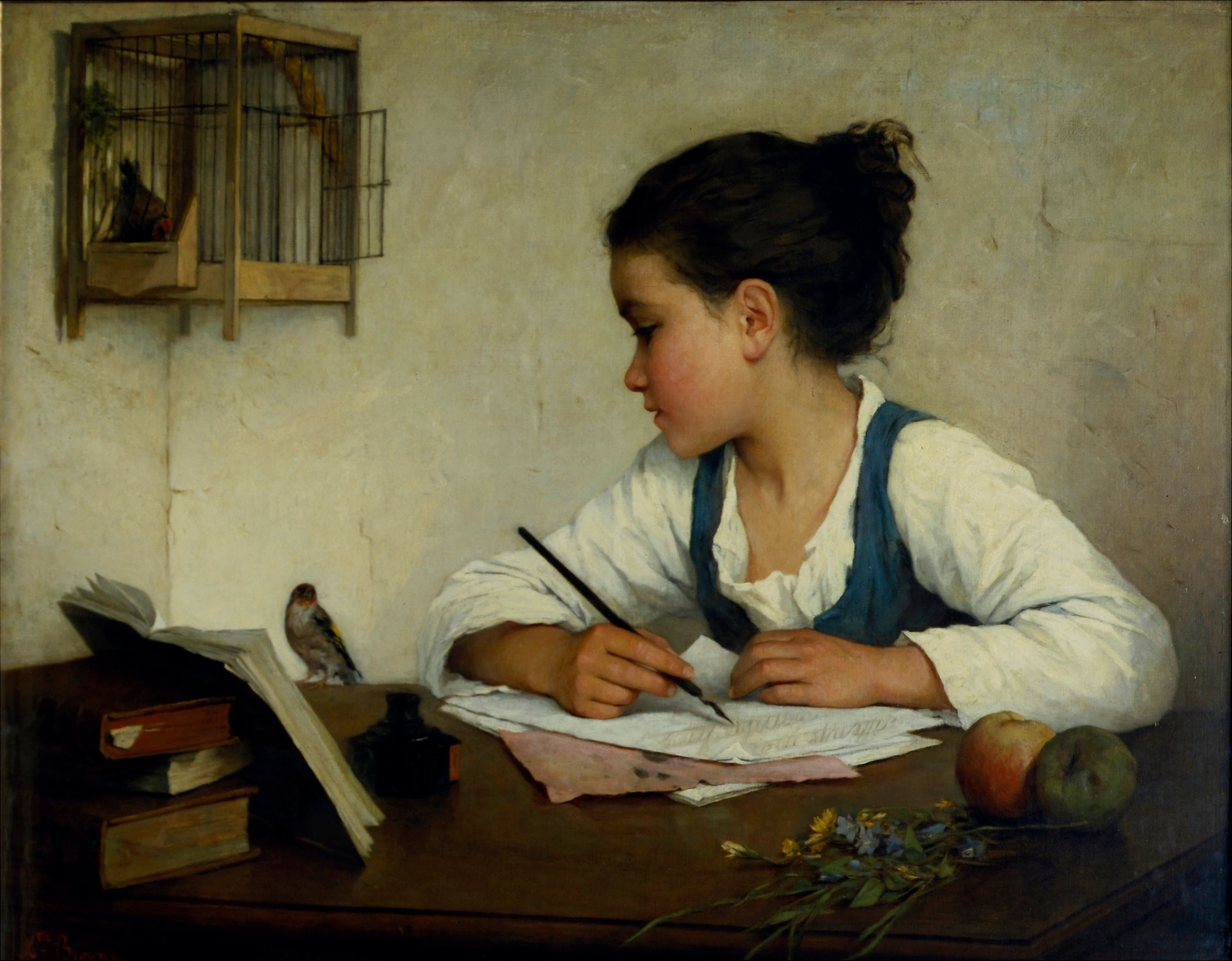
Enfant écrivant (circa 1870), Victoria and Albert Museum

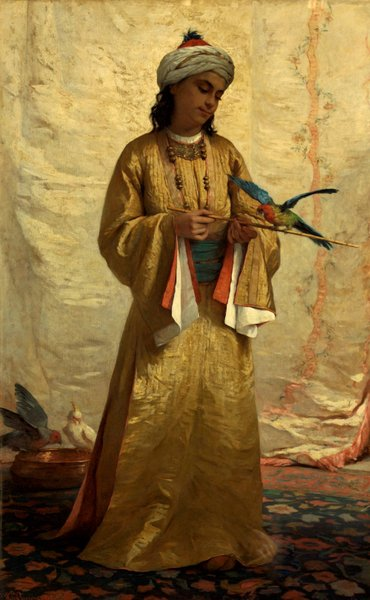
A Moorish Girl with Parakeet (1875), Russell-Cotes Art Gallery & Museum

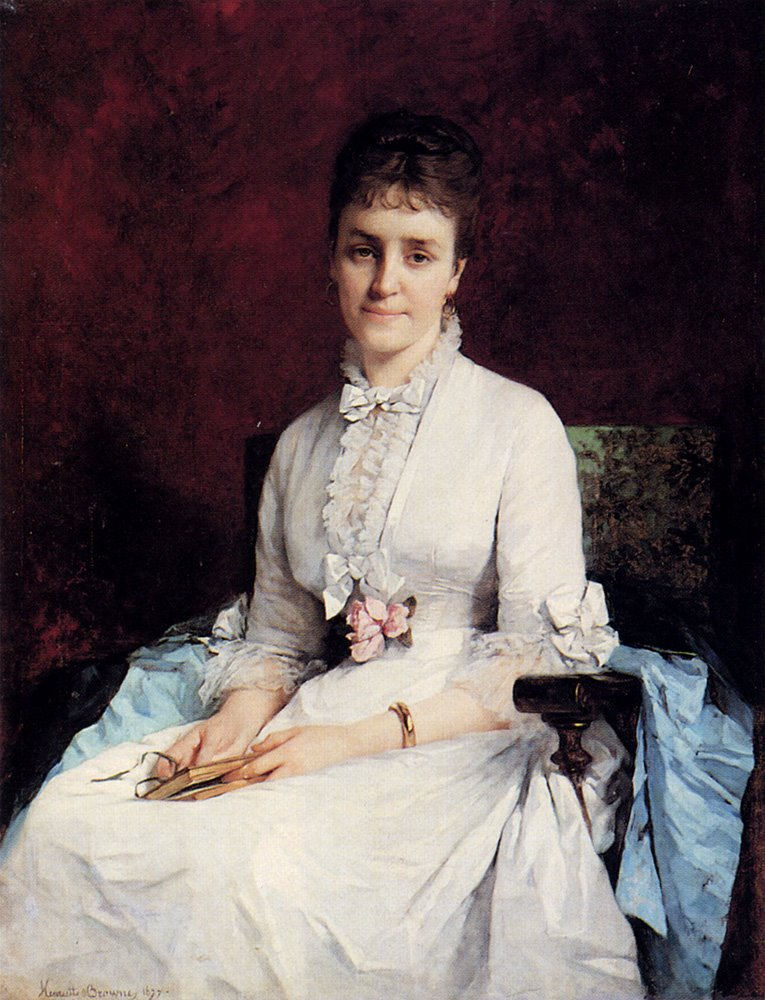
Portrait de femme (1877), private collection

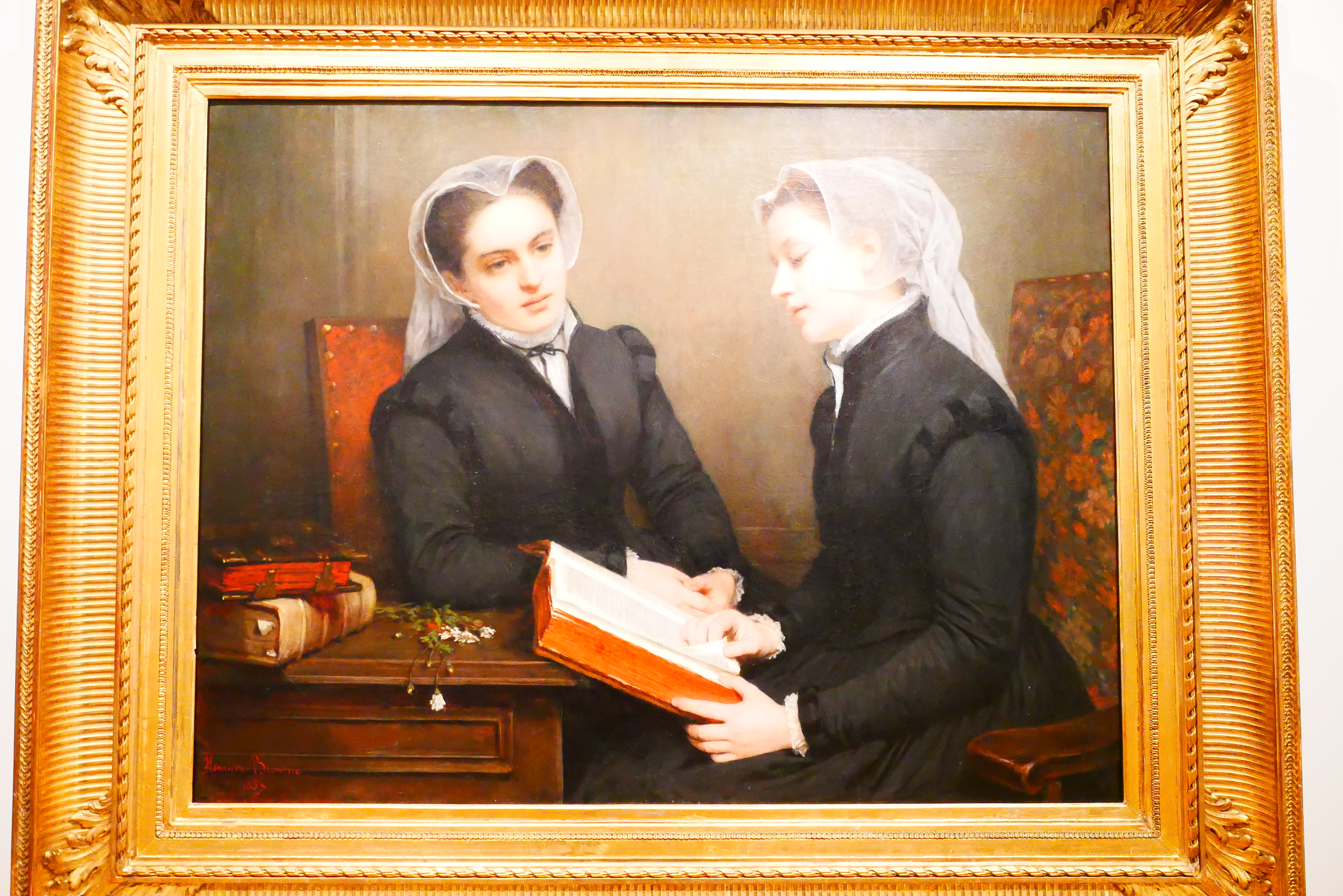
"La Lecture de la Bible" 1857 photographed in Christchurch Art Gallery

== See also ==
- List of Orientalist artists
- Orientalism
