= Summary Execution under the Moorish Kings of Granada =

Painting by Henri Regnault

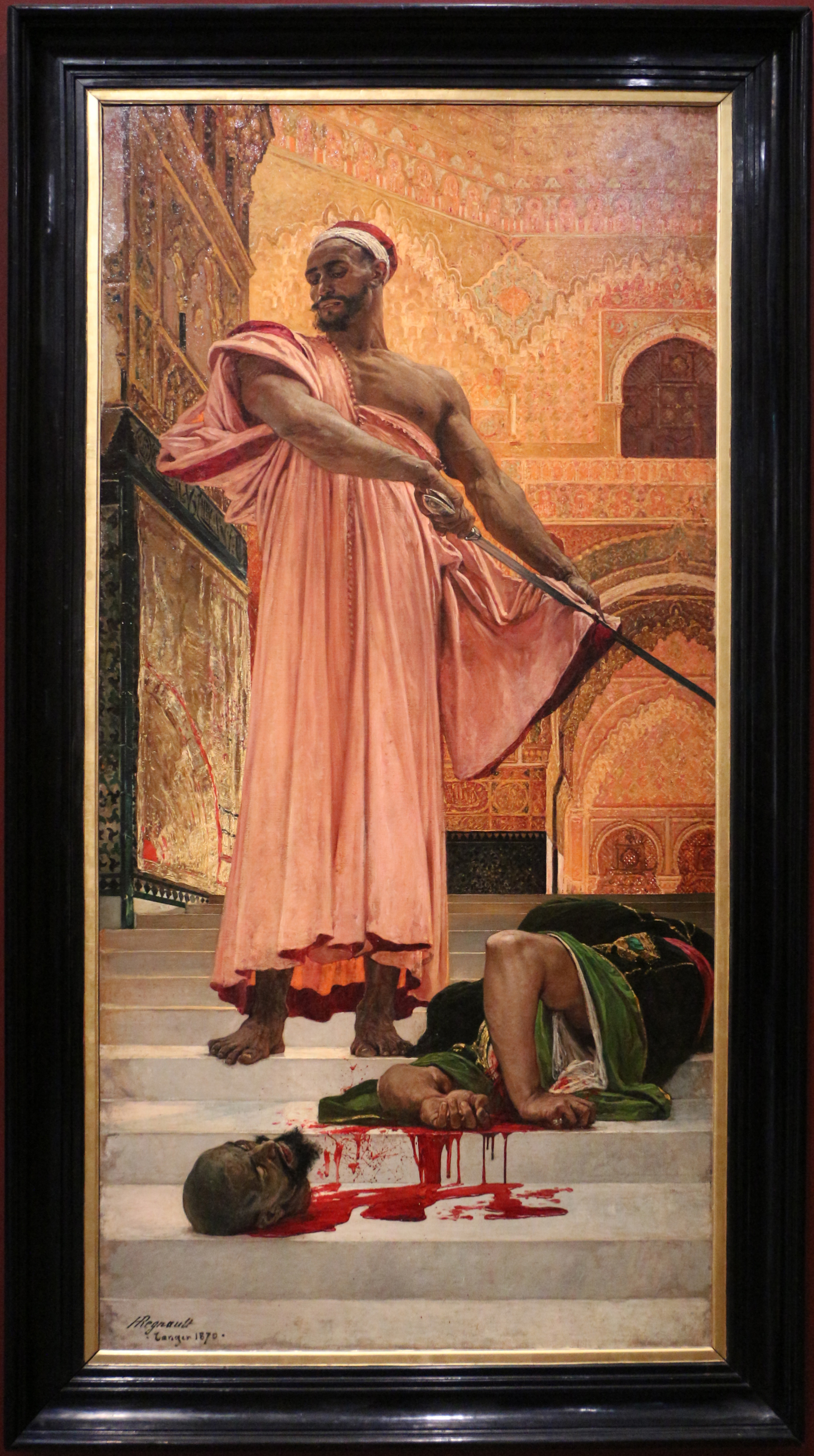
Summary Execution under the Moorish Kings of Granada

Summary Execution under the Moorish Kings of Granada (French: Exécution sans jugement sous les rois maures de Grenade) is an oil on canvas painting by Henri Regnault. Completed in 1870, it was acquired by the state from Regnault's heirs for display at the Musée du Luxembourg. It is currently in the collection of the Musée d'Orsay. A study for the figure of the executioner is also in the collections of the British Museum.

== Subject ==
The subject is a scene of decapitation that takes place in an architectural setting based on the Alhambra, suffused throughout with a sunset glow. An executioner stands on a flight of marble stairs, calmly wiping the blood off his scimitar after striking his victim down. The brilliance of the colours contrasts with the repulsiveness of the subject. The low angle at which the scene is depicted, effectively placing the viewer at the executioners feet, gives his life-sized figure an imposing presence. His emotional detachment and relaxed gesture contrast with the gruesome foreground in which the blood drips down the steps from the lifeless body lying at his feet to its just-severed head.

A fascination for arbitrary punishments carried out in settings of great splendour far from Europe was a common theme of Orientalist paintings. The power of these works drew on the contrast between what was depicted and contemporary European ideas about reducing the scope and barbarity of judicial execution, thus making the representation of the act both thrilling and terrifying. They were also part of a wider tendency in orientalist art to choose disturbing subjects such as slave markets or acts of violence and present them in a style that was both “real” and escapist.

In the late nineteenth century, the North African male body became the subject of homoerotic fascination for some Europeans. A hint of homoeroticism underpins the elegant, muscular figure of the executioner, suggesting fascination and threat.

== Style and technique ==
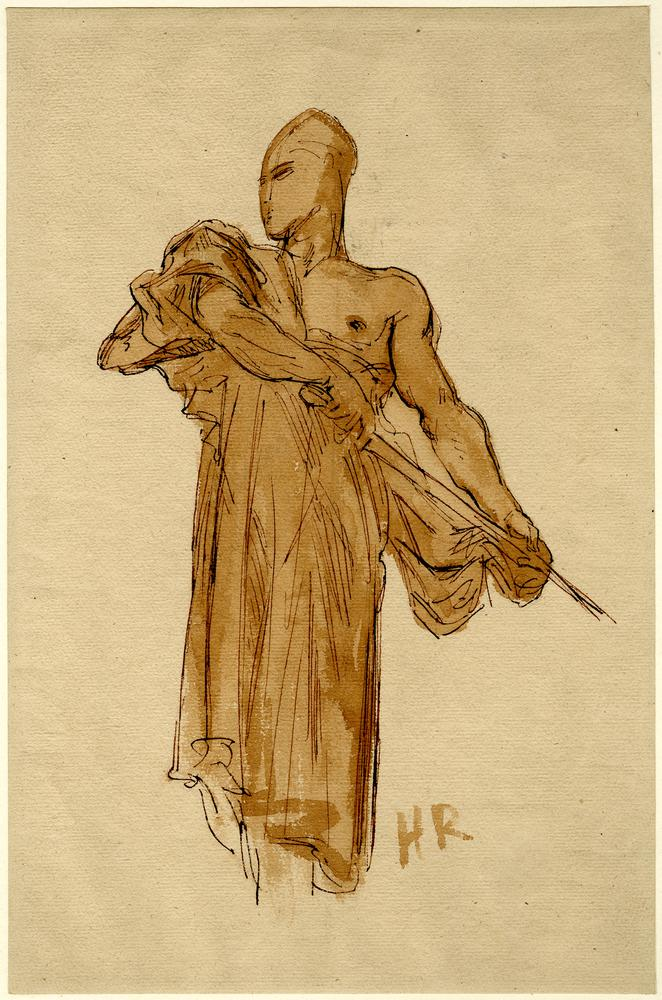
Study for Henri Regnault's 1870 painting Summary Execution under the Moorish Kings of Granada. Pen and brown ink, with brown wash, c. 1870; British Museum.

In technical terms, there is an extreme contrast between the meticulously detailed depiction of the architectural interior in the background and the gruesome realism of the spattering blood in the foreground. Regnault's studio assistant Clairin reported that he literally threw the red paint at the canvas in order to get a completely natural effect. There is also a tension between the “hyper-real” detail of the setting and the figures - Regnault made extensive and detailed sketches in preparation for the work, as well as working from photographs of the architectural motifs - and the fictional, fantasy world represented in the scene. Regnault himself described the painting as showing “the richest civilisation and the keenest cruelty coexisting in titanic, frightful splendour.”

== History ==
The painting was Regnault's third of his annual despatches to Paris after winning the Prix de Rome and it is possibly Regnault's most celebrated work. Painted in Tangiers, it was first exhibited at 'Les Envois de Rome' at the École des Beaux-Arts, Paris in 1871. It has been exhibited on loan many times:

- 1871 - Les Envois de Rome - Ecole nationale supérieure des Beaux-Arts - Paris
- 1871-74 - International Exhibition - London
- 1873 - International Exhibition - Vienna
- 1874 - Musée du Luxembourg - Paris
- 1878 - Exposition Universelle - Paris
- 1974 - Grand Palais - Paris
- 1978-79 - Autour de quelques oeuvres du Second Empire, Palais de Tokyo, Paris
- 1991-92 - Henri Regnault (1843–1871), fr:Musée des Avelines, Saint-Cloud
- 1997 - Les peintres français et l'Espagne de Delacroix à Manet, Goya Museum, Castres
- 2011 - Le génie de l'Orient. L'Europe moderne et les arts de l'Islam, Museum of Fine Arts of Lyon

== Critical reception ==
Roger Marx wrote that Regnault was often drawn, while in Rome, towards the unusual and the bizarre, such as the beheading in Benvenuto Cellini’s Perseus with the Head of Medusa. He also commented unfavourably on the painting’s lack of sympathy or pity.

Henry Roujon admired the painting’s technical virtuosity and use of colour, but, like Marx, deplored what he considered the gratuitous horror of the subject, rendered without “emotion, anguish or pity.” Gustave Geffroy considered it “vulgarly melodramatic.”

John Charles Van Dyke’s view, expressed in a long, three page, paragraph, was that “A painter may make a pictorial presentation of a cartman beating his horse … or a group of monkeys dressed in men's clothing holding a court of divorce, and … interest or amuse us temporarily … Such pictures may possess … beauty … and they may … be considered art … but certainly not by … the beauty in their subjects. Oftentimes artistic execution, color, light, air, save an otherwise commonplace or repulsive theme … It is color, light, and masterly handling of the brush that redeem Regnault's "Execution without Judgment," Fortuny's "Butcher," and Rembrandt's "Dressed Beef." The subjects or the ideas they convey are hardly beautiful … but are made so by superior artistic treatment … [And y]et people rather like the Regnault "Execution" scene, not because of its color and handling, but because it hints at a ghastly story, and they like the humanized monkeys, not because of any pictorial quality, but because they are funny...”

== In popular culture ==
The painting featured in season 4 of the American TV series Fargo. In the penultimate episode, Happy, a copy hangs in the office of gangster Loy Cannon, and in the final episode, Storia Americana, in a flashforward it hangs behind the adult Ethelrida Pearl Smutny. Teenage Ethelrida is the moral compass of the story.
