= Salomé (Henri Regnault) =

Painting by Henri Regnault

- Salomé
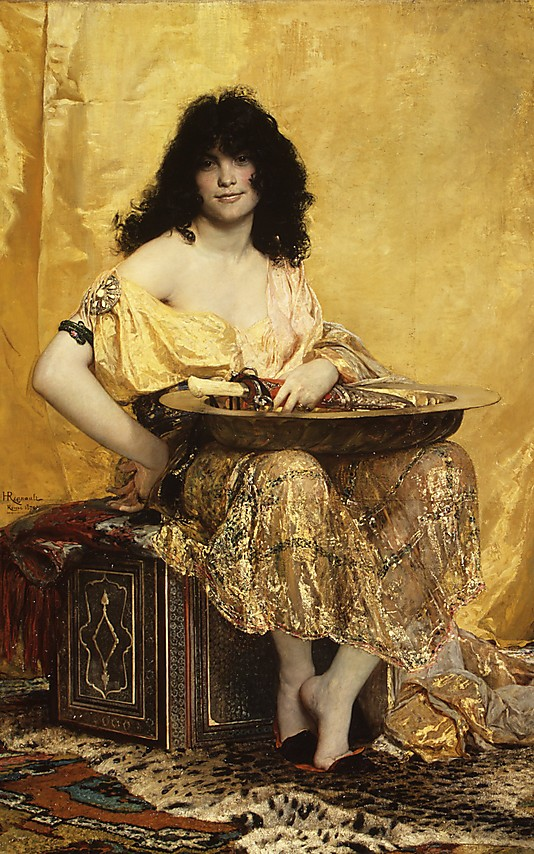
- Artist: Henri Regnault
- Year: 1870
- Medium: oil paint, canvas
- Subject: Salome
- Dimensions: 160 cm (63 in) × 101 cm (40 in)
- Location: Metropolitan Museum of Art
- Accession: 16.95

Salomé is a 19th-century painting by French artist Henri Regnault. Done in oil on canvas, the work depicts the biblical character Salome. The work debuted in the Paris salon of 1870, several months before Regnault was killed in the Franco-Prussian War. The work has been in the collection of the Metropolitan Museum of Art since 1916.
