= Henri Regnault =

French painter (1843–1871)

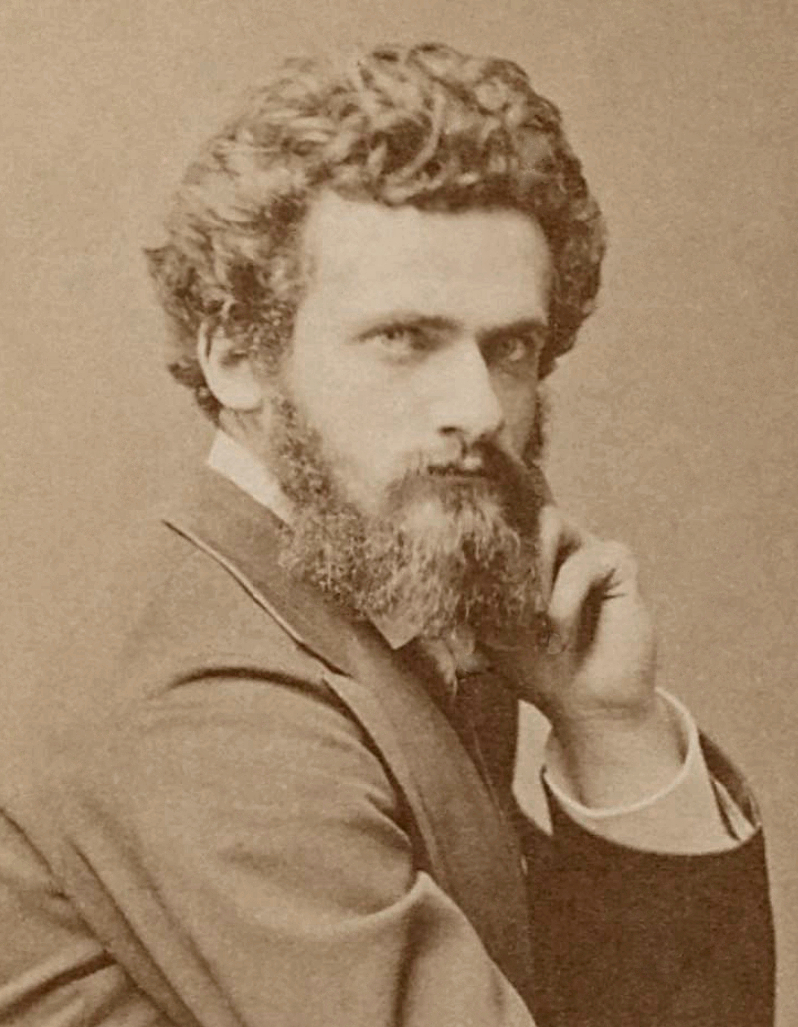
- Born: Alexandre Georges Henri Regnault; 31 October 1843; Paris, France
- Died: 19 January 1871 (aged 27); Rueil-Malmaison, France
- Education: École des Beaux-Arts; French Academy in Rome
- Notable work: Salomé (1870)
- Style: French Orientalism
- Father: Henri Victor Regnault
- Awards: Prix de Rome (1866)
- Military career
- Allegiance: France
- Branch: French Army
- Service years: 1870–1871
- Conflicts: Franco-Prussian War; Siege of Paris; 2nd Battle of Buzenval †

Alexandre Georges Henri Regnault (French pronunciation: [alɛksɑ̃dʁ ʒɔʁʒ ɑ̃ʁi ʁəɲo]; 31 October 1843 – 19 January 1871) was a French painter.

== Biography ==
Regnault was born in Paris, the son of Henri Victor Regnault. On leaving school he successively entered the studios of Antoine Montfort, Louis Lamothe and Alexandre Cabanel, was beaten for the Prix de Rome (1863) by Joseph Layraud and Xaiver Monchablon, and in 1864 exhibited two unremarkable portraits at the Paris Salon. In 1866, however, he carried off the Prix de Rome with a work of unusual force and distinction Thetis bringing the Arms forged by Vulcan to Achilles (École de Beaux-Arts).

The past in Italy did not touch him, but his illustrations to Wey's Rome show how observant he was of actual life and manners; even his Automedon (School of Fine Arts), executed in obedience to Academical regulations, was but a lively recollection of a carnival horse-race. At Rome, moreover, Regnault came into contact with the modern Hispano-Italian school, a school highly materialistic and inclined to regard even the human subject only as one amongst many sources of visual amusement. The vital, if narrow, energy of this school told on Regnault with ever-increasing force during the few remaining years of his life.

In 1868 he had sent to the Salon a life-size portrait of a lady in which he had made one of the first attempts to render the actual character of fashionable modern life. While making a tour in Spain, he saw General Juan Prim pass at the head of his troops, and received that lively image of a military demagogue which he afterwards put on canvas, somewhat to the displeasure of his subject. But this work made an appeal to the imagination of the public, while all the later productions of Regnault were addressed exclusively to the eye.

After a further trip to North Africa, abridged by the necessities of his position as a pensioner of the school of Rome, he painted Judith, then, in 1870, Salomé, and, as a work due from the Roman school, dispatched from Tangier the large canvas, Summary Execution under the Moorish Kings of Granada. The Franco-Prussian War arose, and found Regnault at the Battle of Buzenval, where he was killed on 19 January 1871.

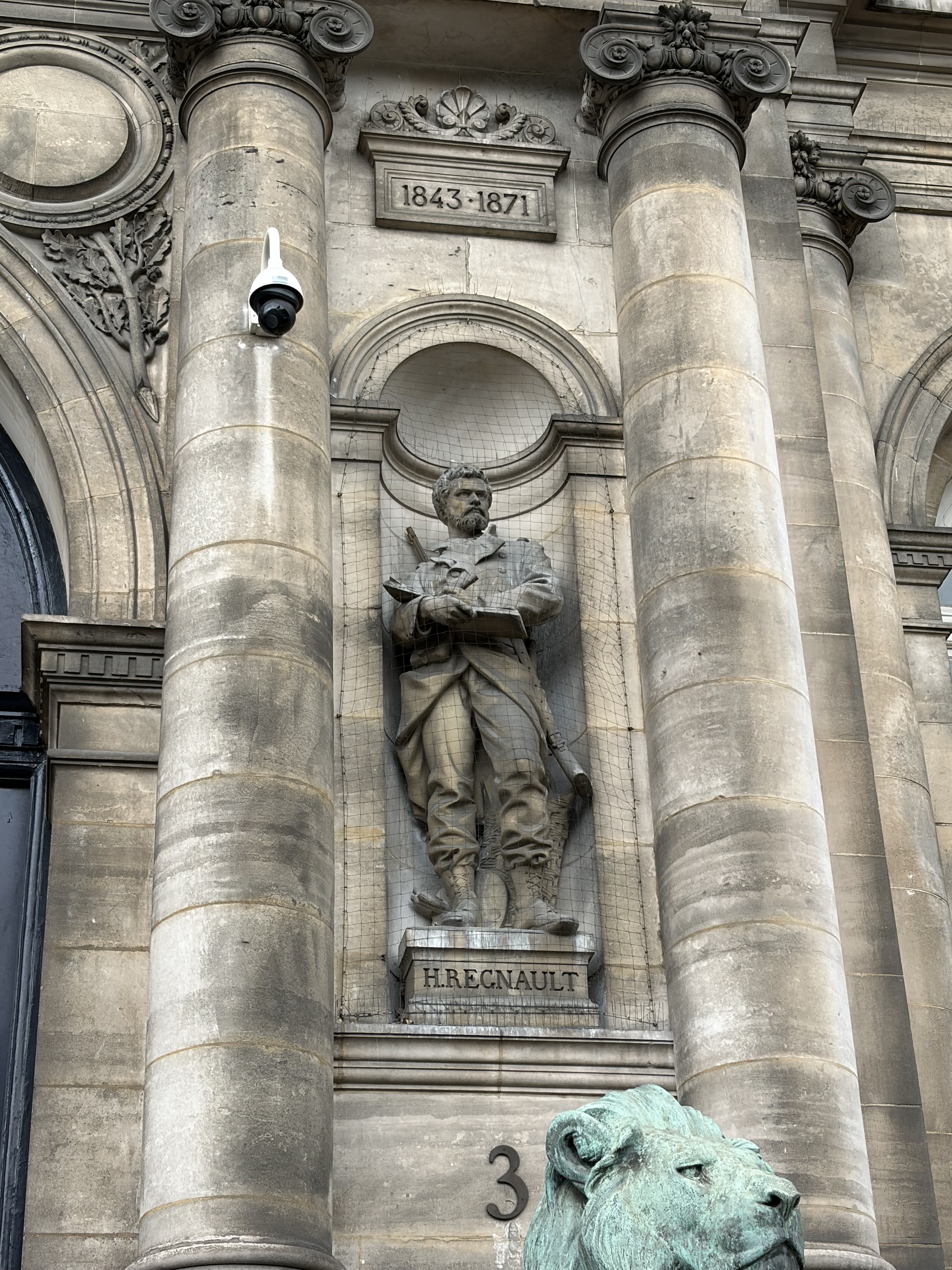
Statue of Regnault on the facade of Paris' Hôtel de Ville.

His friend, the composer Camille Saint-Saëns dedicated his Marche héroïque (1871) to Regnault's memory. The sculptor Henri Chapu erected a monument to him in the courtyard of the École des Beaux-Arts in 1872. Jean-Louis-Ernest Meissonier painted him in the centre of his Le siège de Paris as the soldier collapsed against the personification of Paris.

Marc Gotlieb's The Deaths of Henri Regnault (University of Chicago Press, 2016) documents the vicissitudes of Regnault's legacy as artist and national symbol.

== Gallery ==
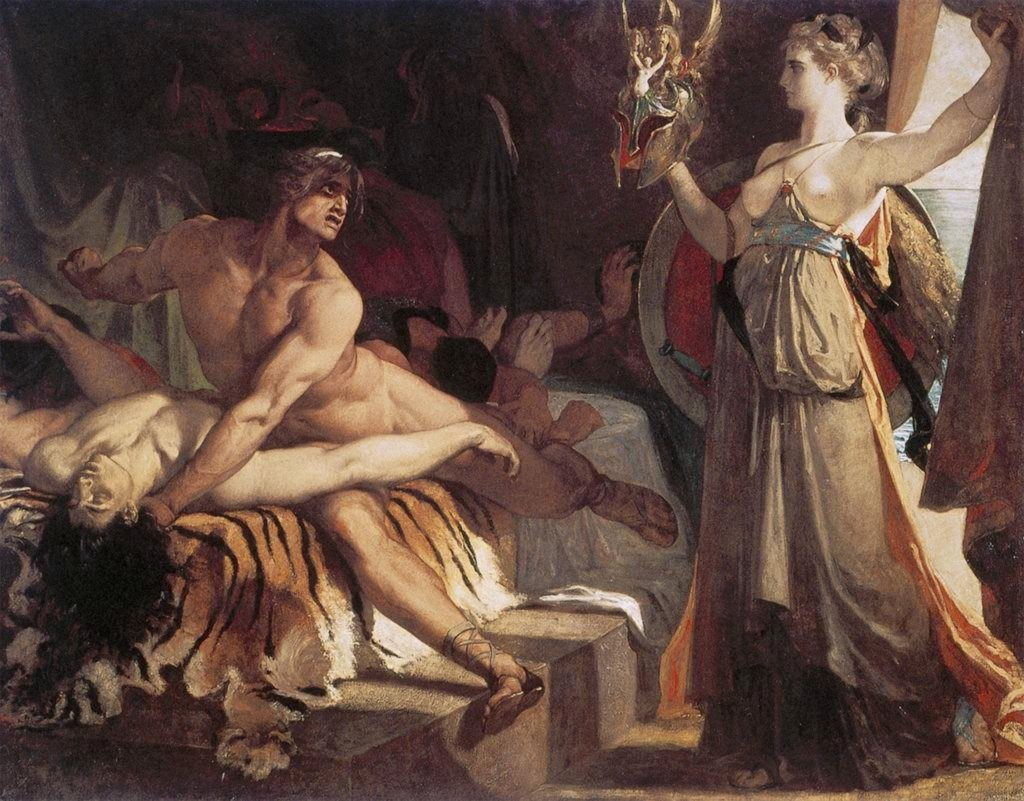
Thetis bringing the Arms forged by Vulcan to Achilles (1866), Beaux-Arts de Paris

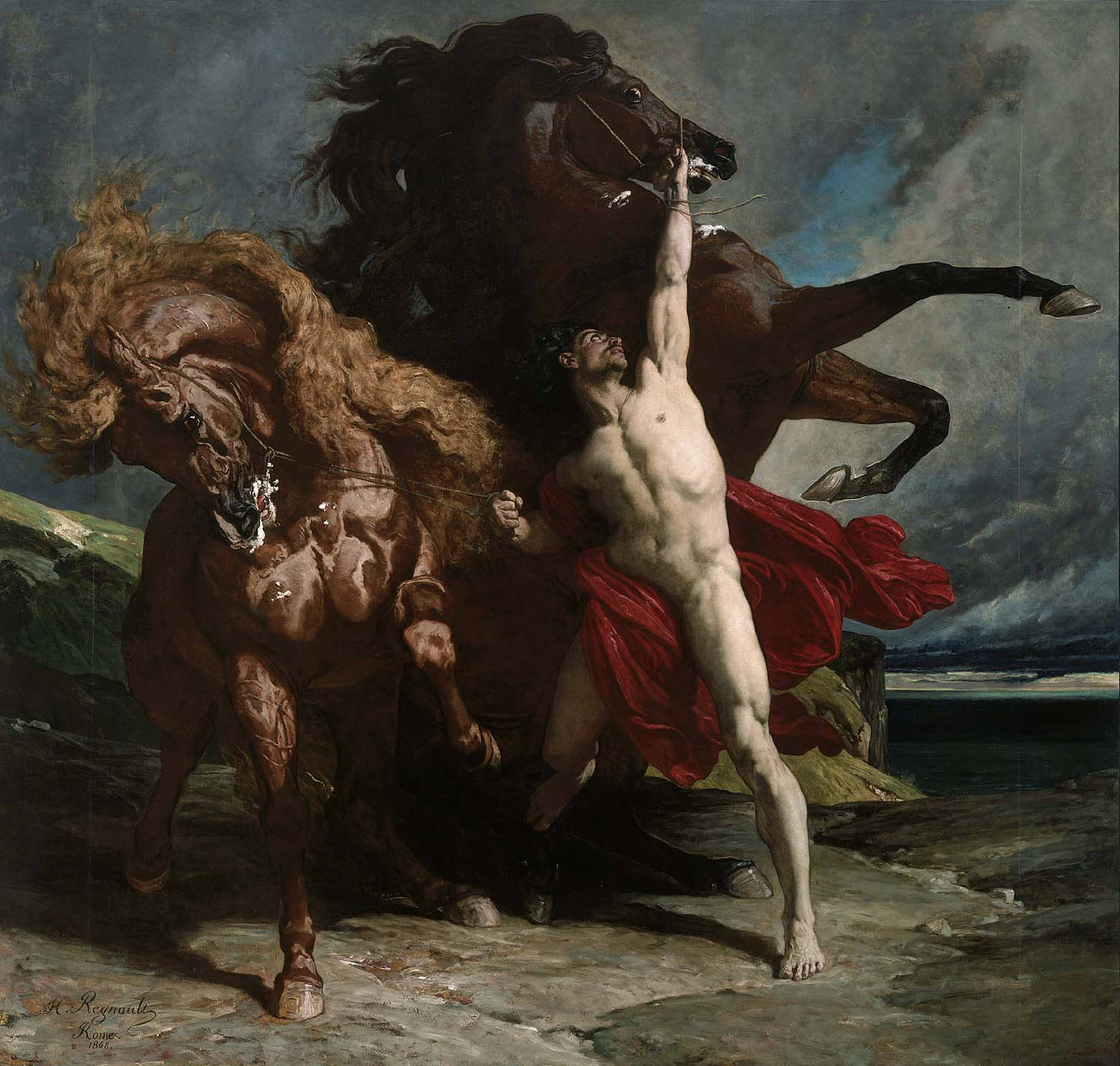
Automedon with the Horses of Achilles (1868), Museum of Fine Arts, Boston

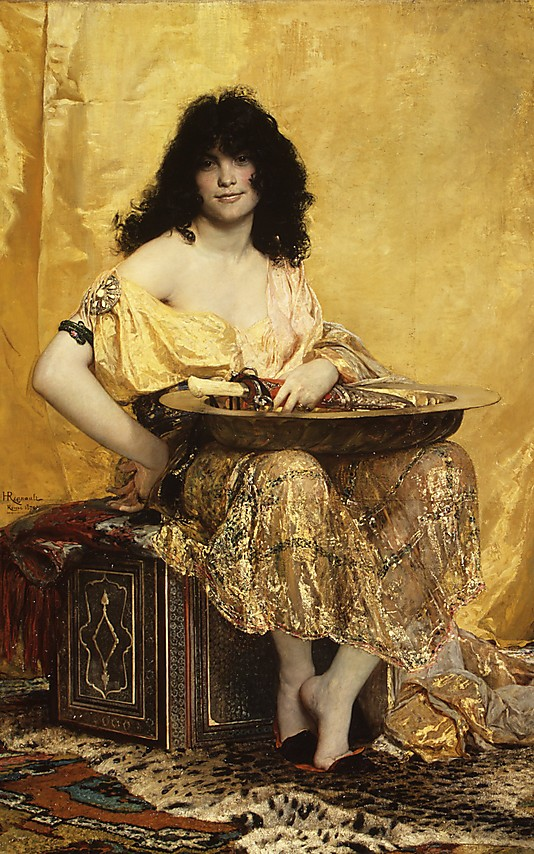
Salomé (1870), Metropolitan Museum of Art

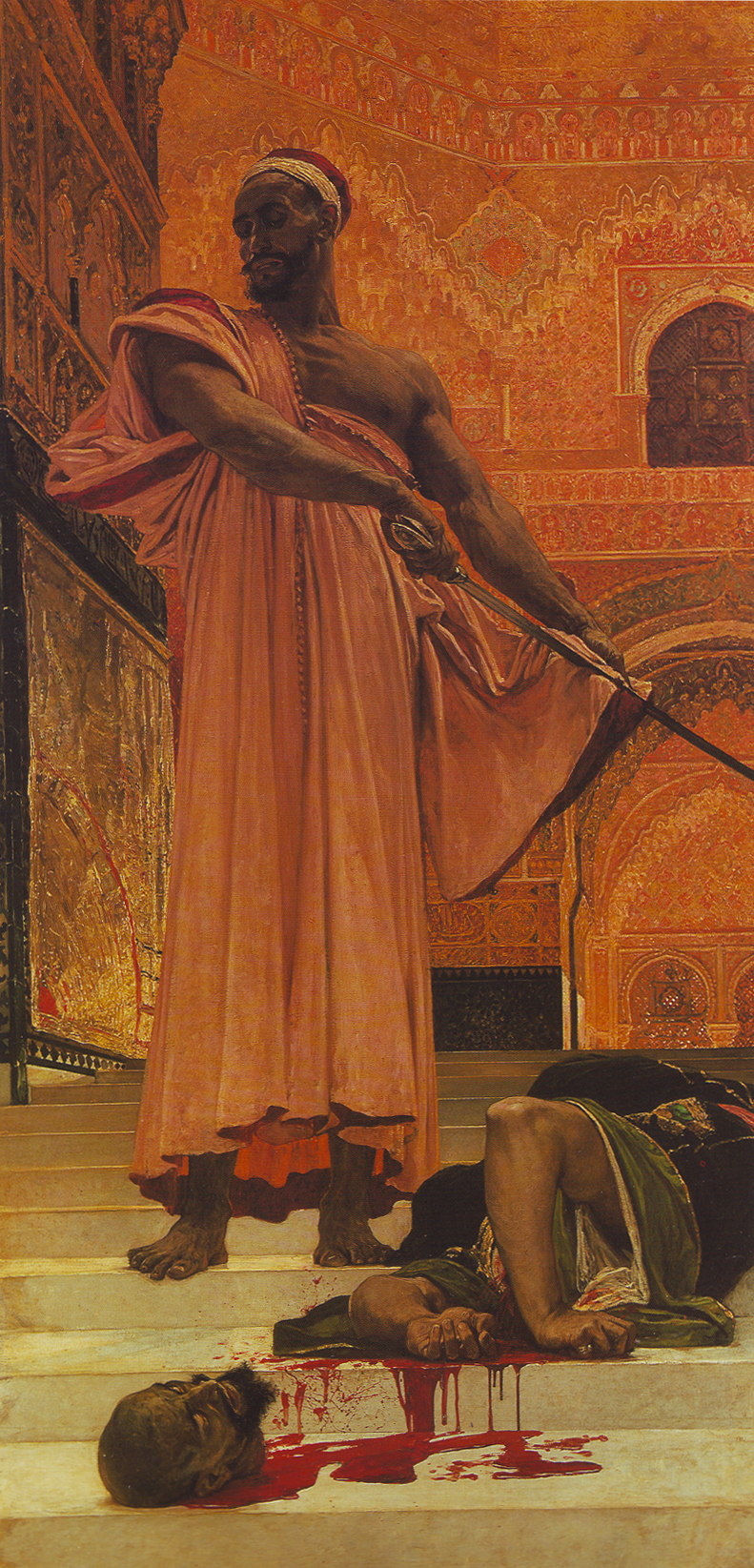
Summary Execution under the Moorish Kings of Granada (1870), Musée d'Orsay

== See also ==
- List of Orientalist artists
