= San Clemente (disambiguation) =

San Clemente is a city in Southern California in the United States.

San Clemente may also refer to:

== Places ==
=== Argentina ===
- San Clemente del Tuyú, a town in the Partido de la Costa district of the Province of Buenos Aires

=== Chile ===
- San Clemente, Chile, a city and commune administered by the municipality of San Clemente, located in the Talca Province, in the Maule Region

=== Ecuador ===
- San Clemente, Ecuador, a coastal village located in the province of Manabí
- San Clemente Island (Galápagos), a former name of Santa Cruz Island in the Galápagos

=== Italy ===
- San Clemente, Emilia-Romagna, a comune in the province of Rimini, in the region Emilia-Romagna
- Basilica di San Clemente, a Roman Catholic minor basilica dedicated to Pope Clement I located in Rome
- Isola di San Clemente, a small island in the Venetian Lagoon
- San Clemente, Padua, the Piazza dei Signori in Padua
- Palazzo di San Clemente, a residential palace in Florence
- San Clemente, Brescia, an ancient church located in central Brescia, near the Piazza del Foro, Italy
- Abbey of San Clemente a Casauria, an abbey in Castiglione a Casauria, in the province of Pescara, Abruzzo, central Italy
- Abbey of San Clemente al Volmano, in the province of Teramo, Abruzzo

=== Peru ===
- San Clemente District, one of eight districts of the province Pisco

=== Philippines ===
- San Clemente, Tarlac, a fifth class municipality in the province of Tarlac

=== Spain ===
- San Clemente, Cuenca, a municipality in the province of Cuenca, in the autonomous community of Castile-La Mancha
- Cuevas de San Clemente, a municipality in the province of Burgos, in the autonomous community of Castile and León
- San Clemente (Ibias), one of eleven parishes (administrative divisions) in the municipality of Ibias, within the province and autonomous community of Asturias
- San Clemente Dormitory, a public dormitory, depending on the University of Santiago de Compostela, located in the city of Santiago de Compostela, Galicia, Spain
- San Clemente Reservoir, a reservoir in Huéscar, province of Granada, Andalusia, Spain

=== United States ===
- San Clemente State Beach
- San Clemente Island, California
- San Clemente Island Air Force Station
- San Clemente Canyon, San Diego, California
- San Clemente Dam, Monterey County, California
- San Clemente station, Los Angeles, California
- USS San Clemente (AG-79)

=== Other uses ===
- San Clemente Handicap, an American horse race
- San Clemente loggerhead shrike, a bird subspecies endemic to San Clemente Island, California
- San Clemente High School (disambiguation), various high schools

== See also ==
- Saint Clement (disambiguation) (English) or Saint-Clément (French) forms of the same name
- São Clemente (disambiguation), Portuguese form of the same name
- Sveti Kliment (disambiguation), the form of the name in several Slavic languages
- Saint Klemens (disambiguation), the German and Greek form of the name
- Oranges and Lemons (Say the bells of St. Clement's), a nursery rhyme
