= Monumental Cemetery of Brescia =

Cemetery in Brescia, Italy

- Interactive map of Monumental Cemetery of Brescia

Details
- Established: 19 January 1810
- Location: Brescia
- Country: Italy
- Coordinates: 45°32′28″N 10°12′08″E
- Type: public
- Style: Neoclassic

The Monumental Cemetery of Brescia (also known as Vantiniano) is one of the first and most ancient monumental cemeteries in Italy. It was the first construction project by the Neoclassical architect Rodolfo Vantini, who started its erection in 1813 and dedicated his whole life to its creation.

== History ==
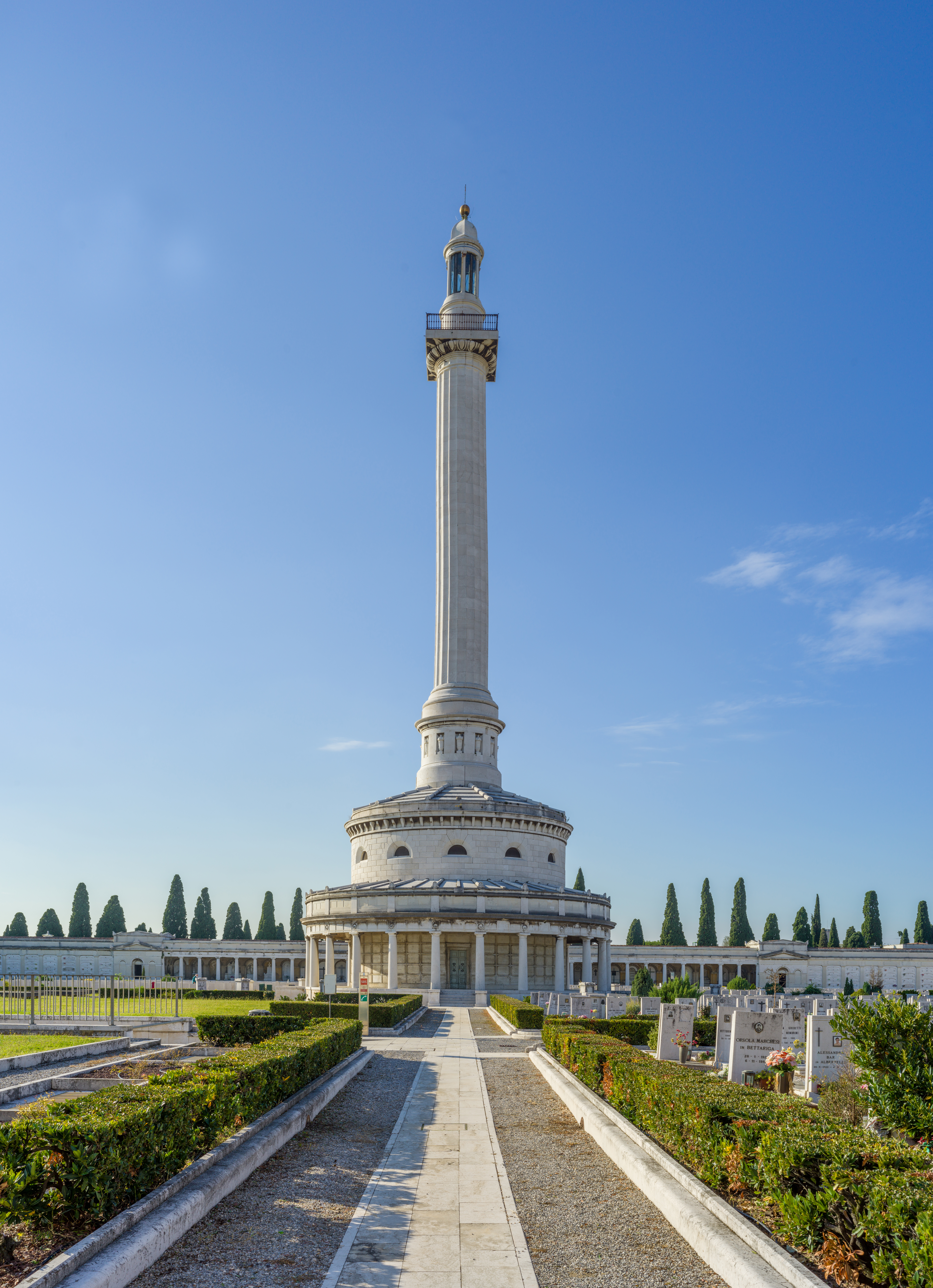
The lighthouse was built between 1869 and 1870

The Napoleonic Edict of Saint-Cloud enacted on 12 June 1804 established some rules related to the public healthcare, imposing a certain distance between the place designated for burials and residential areas.

In 1806, Brescia was one of the first cities to promulgate a law based on the edict and the city deputation decided to establish a graveyard following the new guidelines. The designated area was chosen to be out of Porta San Giovanni, while on 12 September 1808 the City of Brescia acquired new lands for this purpose. On 19 January 1810, the bishop Gabrio Maria Nava consecrated the place and immediately after the cemetery started to be used. In 1814, after many debates about the facility enhancement, the architect Rodolfo Vantini was nominated to build a funerary chapel.

During the following years, neoclassical arcades and buildings inspired by Hellenistic architecture were added to this area thanks to Vantini even though the whole construction took several years and was only completed at the beginning of the XX century, after Vantini’s death.

== Description ==
The main sections which compose the Cemetery are:

- The central chapel dedicated to Saint Michael, whose statue was sculpted by Democrito Gandolfi.
- The municipal chapel or Rotondina Comunale, the very first pantheon of the cemetery. From 1833 to 1904, 25 politicians and eminent personas from Brescia were buried in this chapel.
- The green hemicycle opposite to the St. Michael chapel, composed by 66 memorial cenotaphs which tribute renowned Brescian personalities: poets, entrepreneurs, intellectuals and soldiers.
- The lighthouse, which was finished in 1870, it's 60 meters high and has a circular basement surrounded by porticos and tombs, moreover, a lantern has been positioned on the top. The Berlin Victory Column by the German architect Johann Heinrich Strack was inspired by Vantini's lighthouse. Furthermore, the tomb and the statue of Rodolfo Vantini by Giovanni Seleroni have been positioned inside the monument central hall.
- The military ossuary, one of the biggest military funerary monument in Italy. It was constructed during the 1920s in order to commemorate the fallen of World War I.
- The Pantheon (or Famedio in Italian), a hall dedicated to the most eminent people from Brescia and to those who lived there.
- The pyramidal shaped tomb of Giovanni Battista Bossini.
- A section for Muslims.

== Notable burials ==
- Tito Speri (1825–1853), patriot and hero of the Risorgimento;
- Rodolfo Vantini (1792–1856), architect and creator of the Cemetery;
- Giuseppe Zanardelli (1826–1903), jurist and politician, Prime Minister of Italy from 1901 to 1903;
- Cesare Arici (1782–1836), poet;
- Annibale Calini (1882–1916), count;
- Ugo da Como (1869–1941), politician and deputy.
- Hina Saleem (1985–2006), victim of an honour killing

== Monuments ==
=== Bronze monuments ===
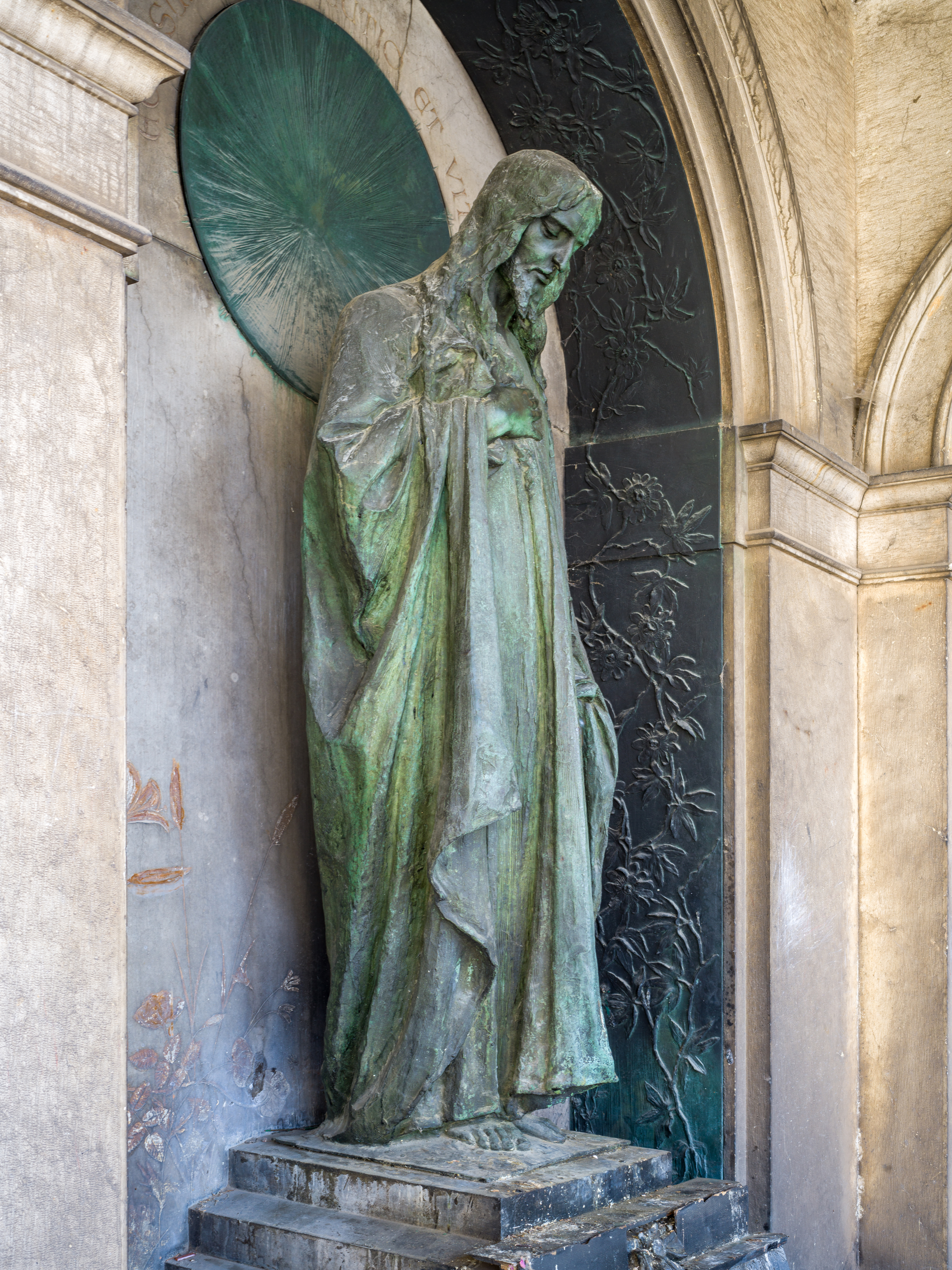
Christ the Redeemer

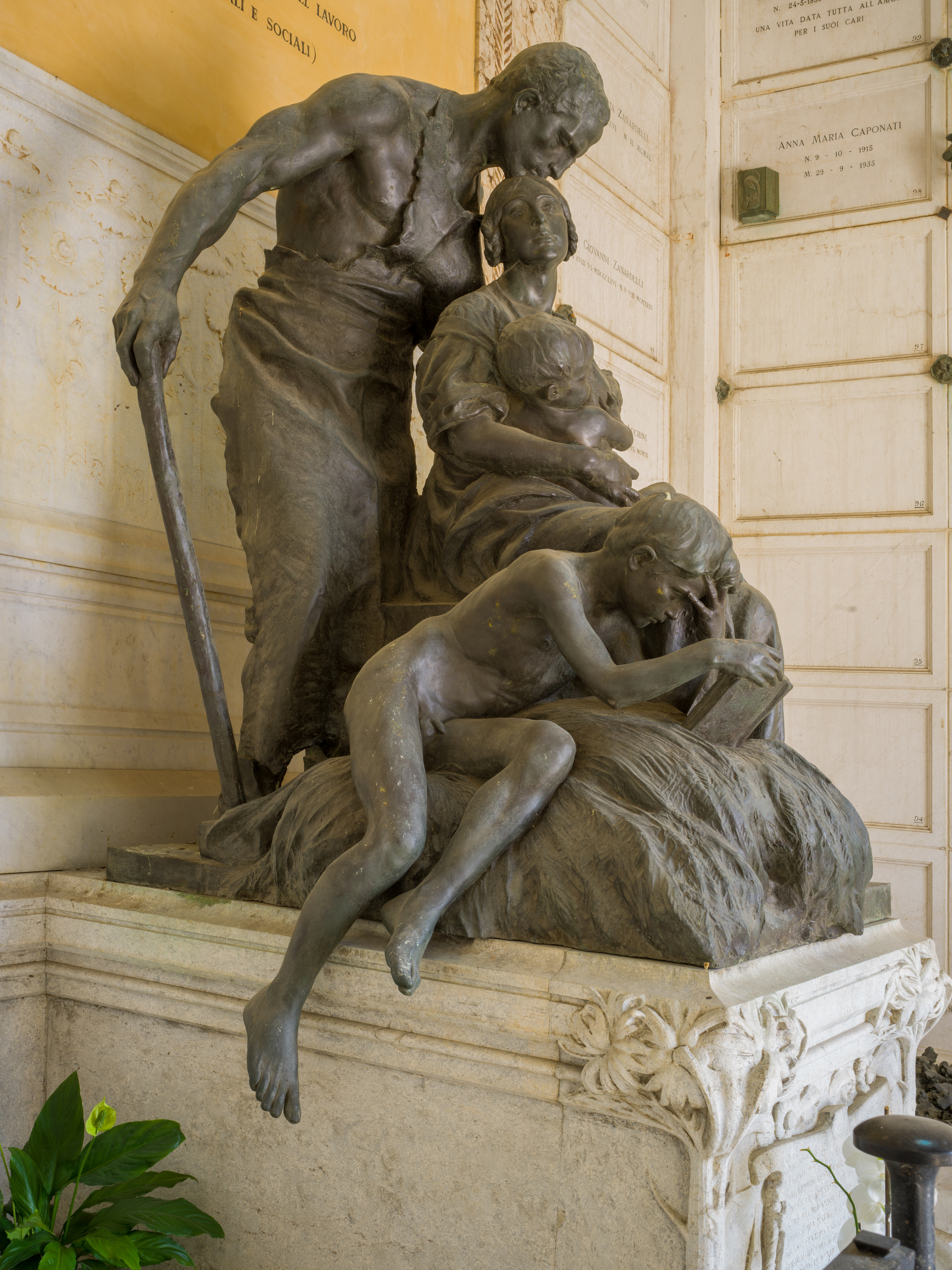
Zanardelli's tomb by Ettore Ximenes

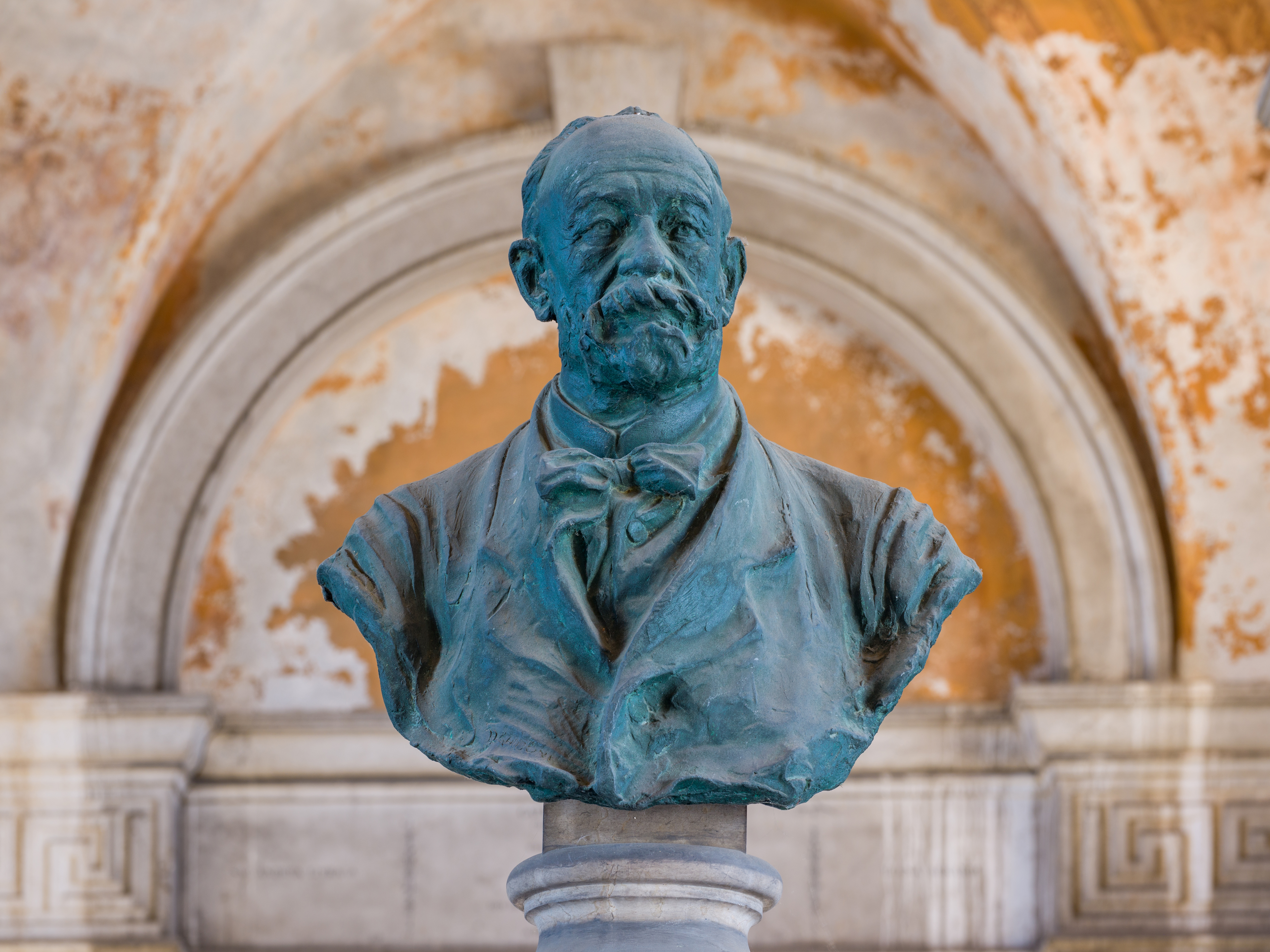
Antonio Tagliaferri bust

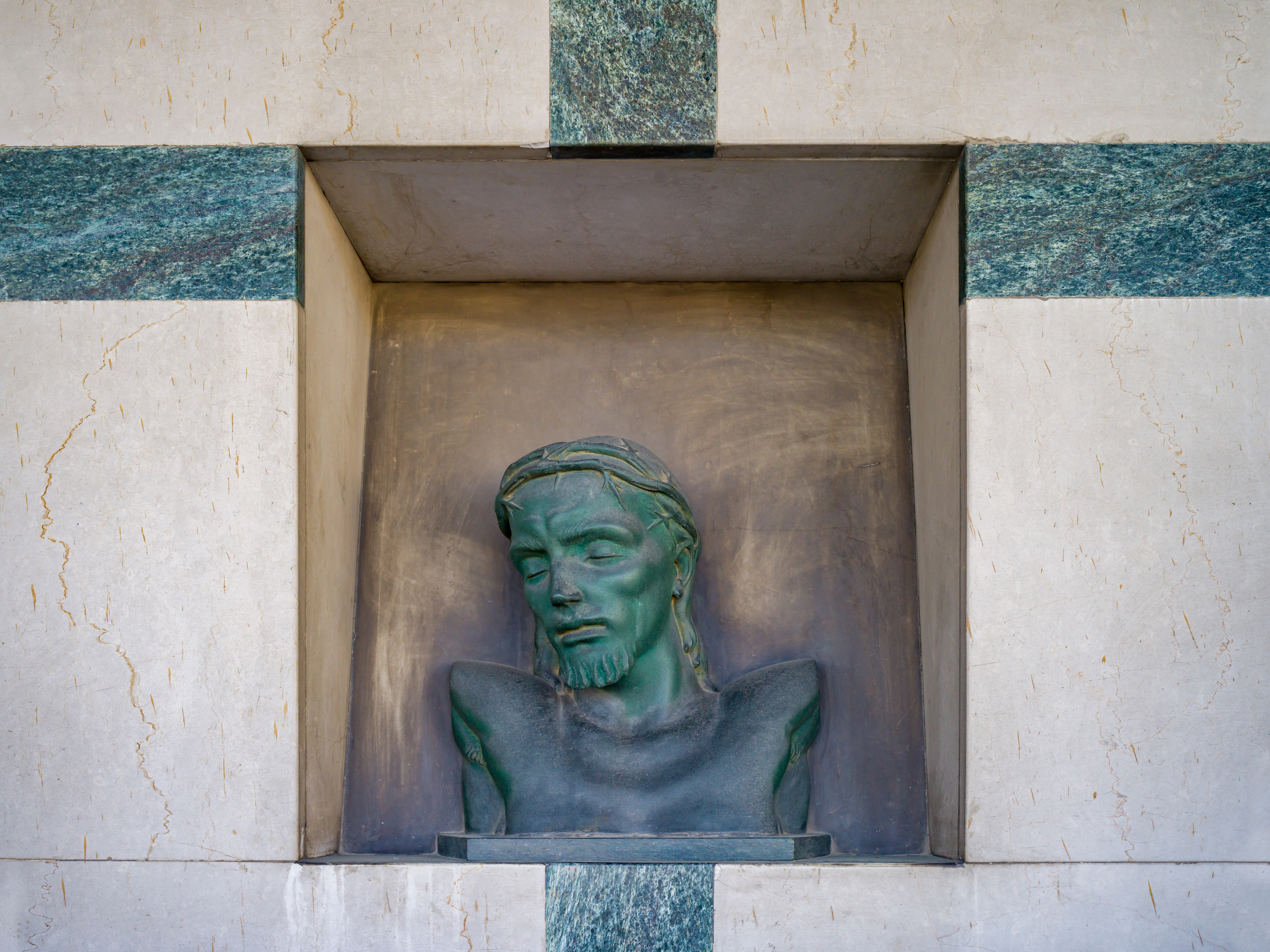
Christ bust

Weeping women

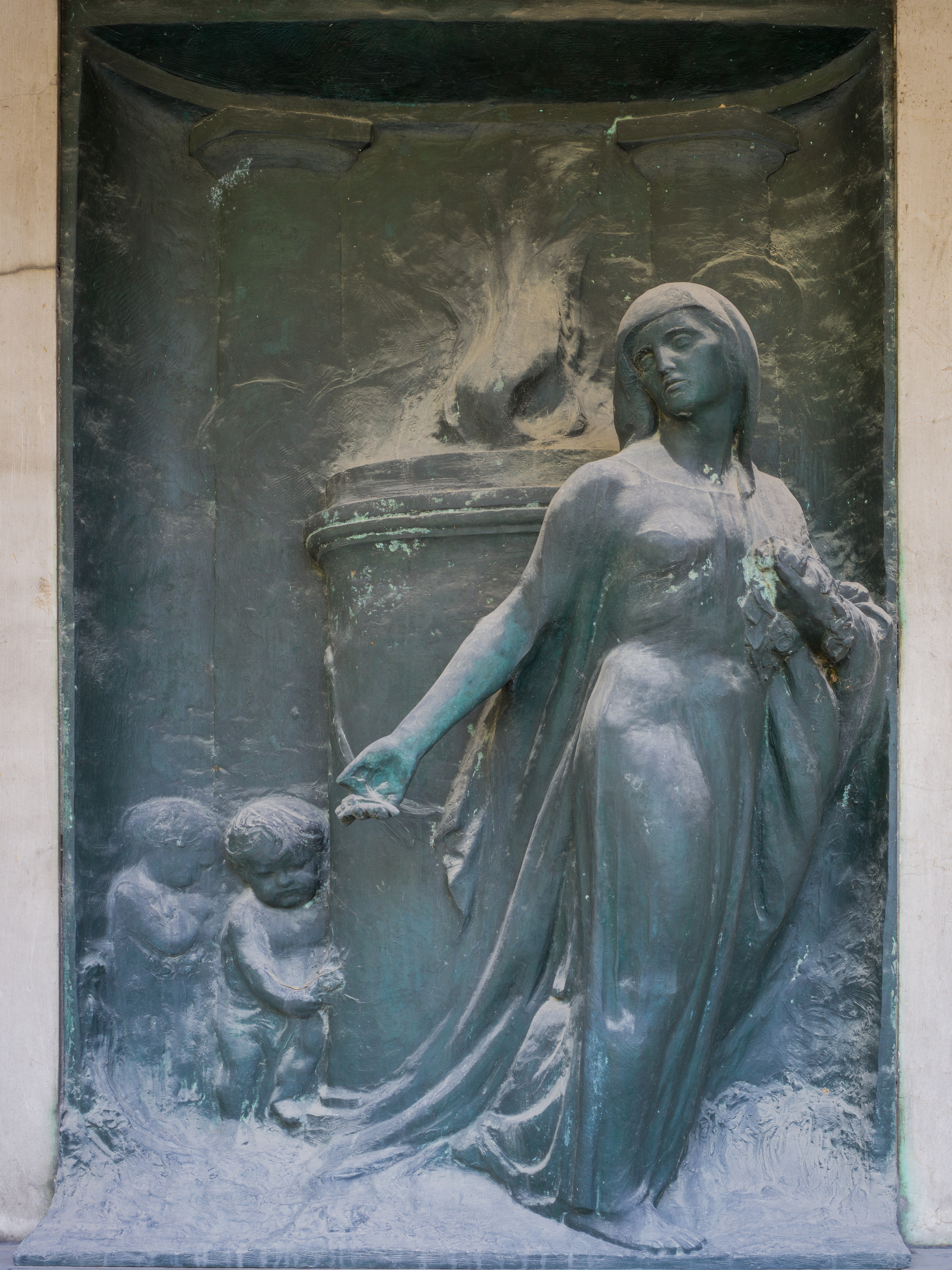
Cuni's family tomb

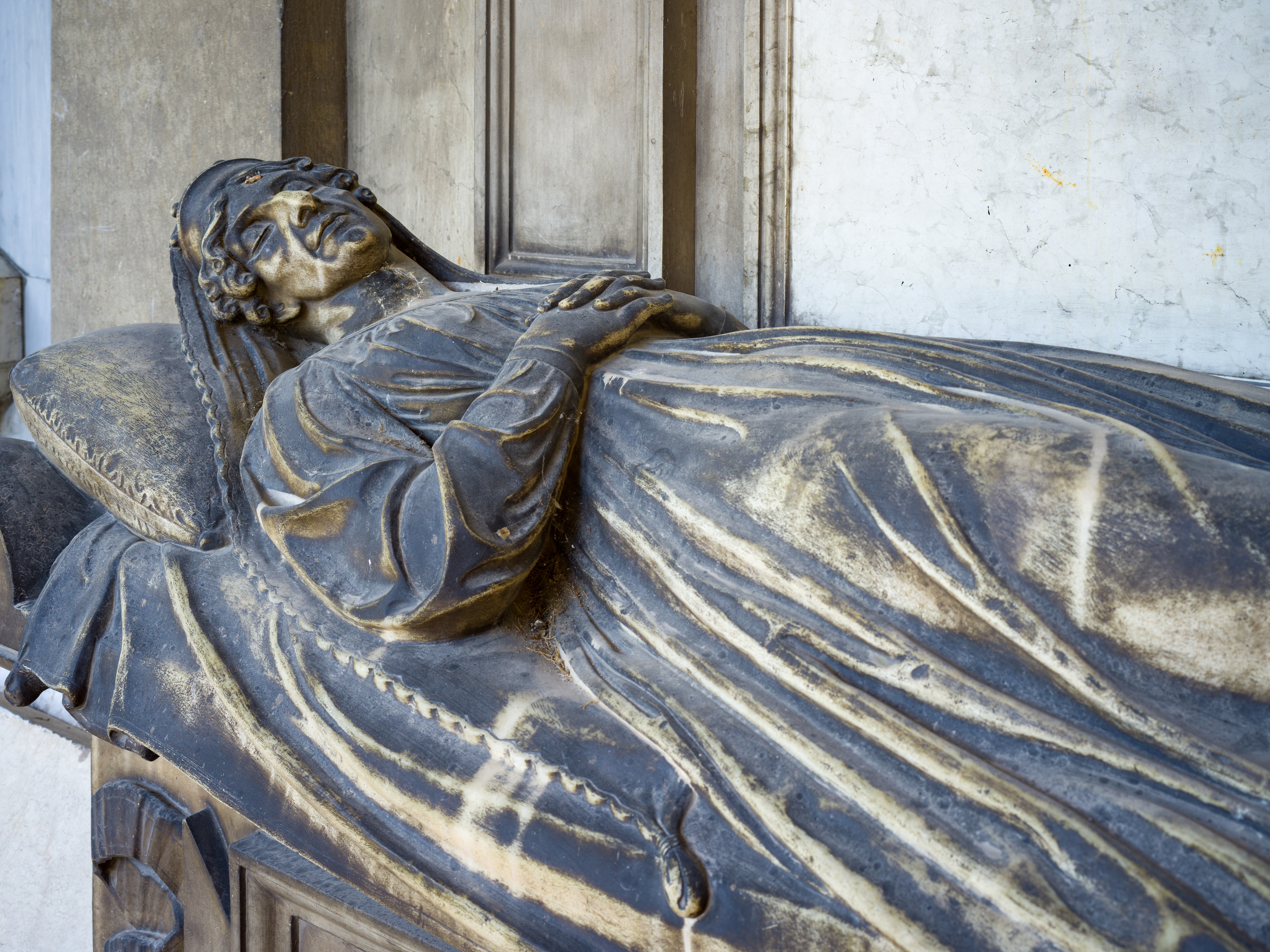
Martinengo Cesaresco's family tomb

=== Marble monuments ===
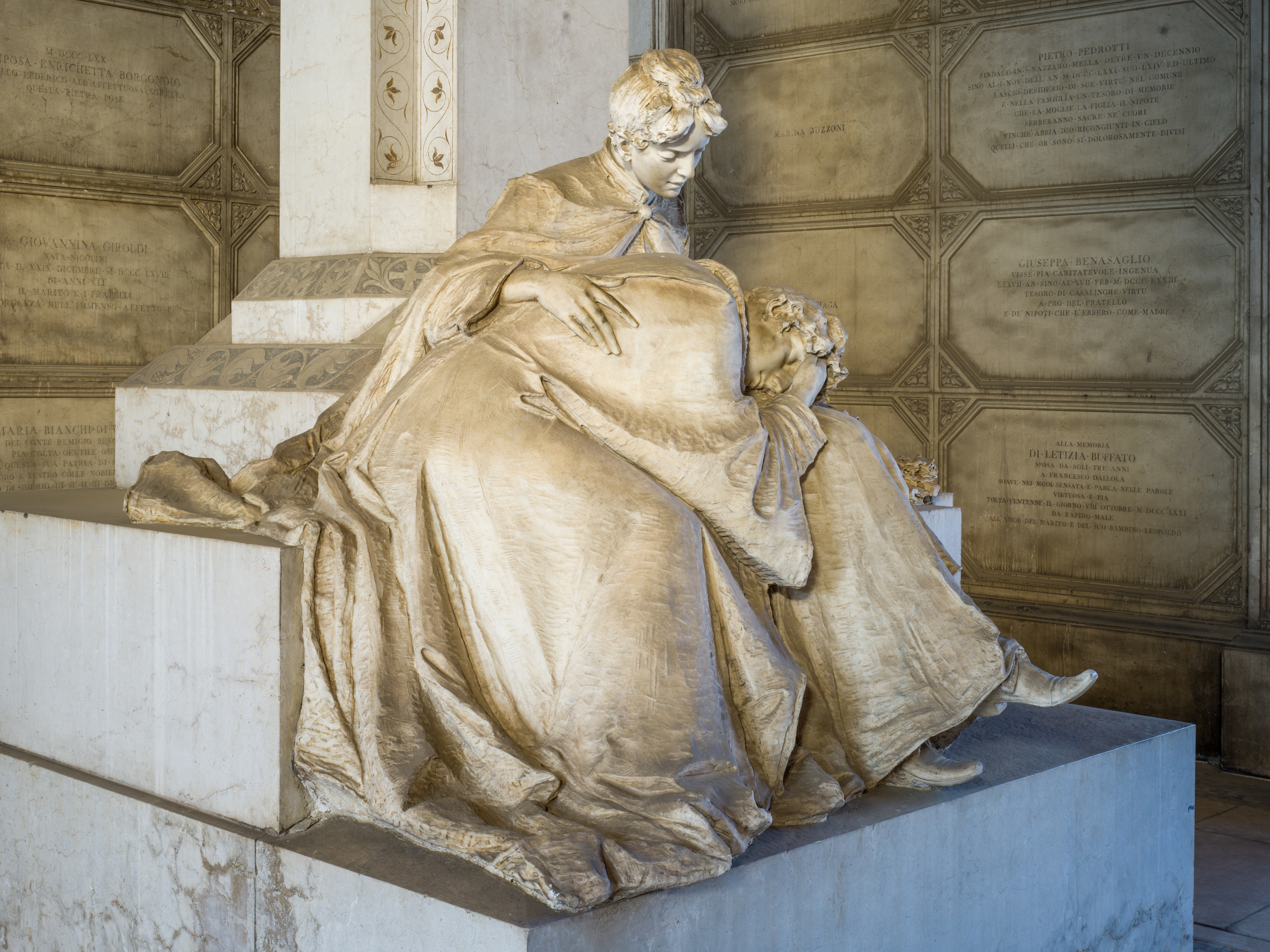
Soccini's family tomb

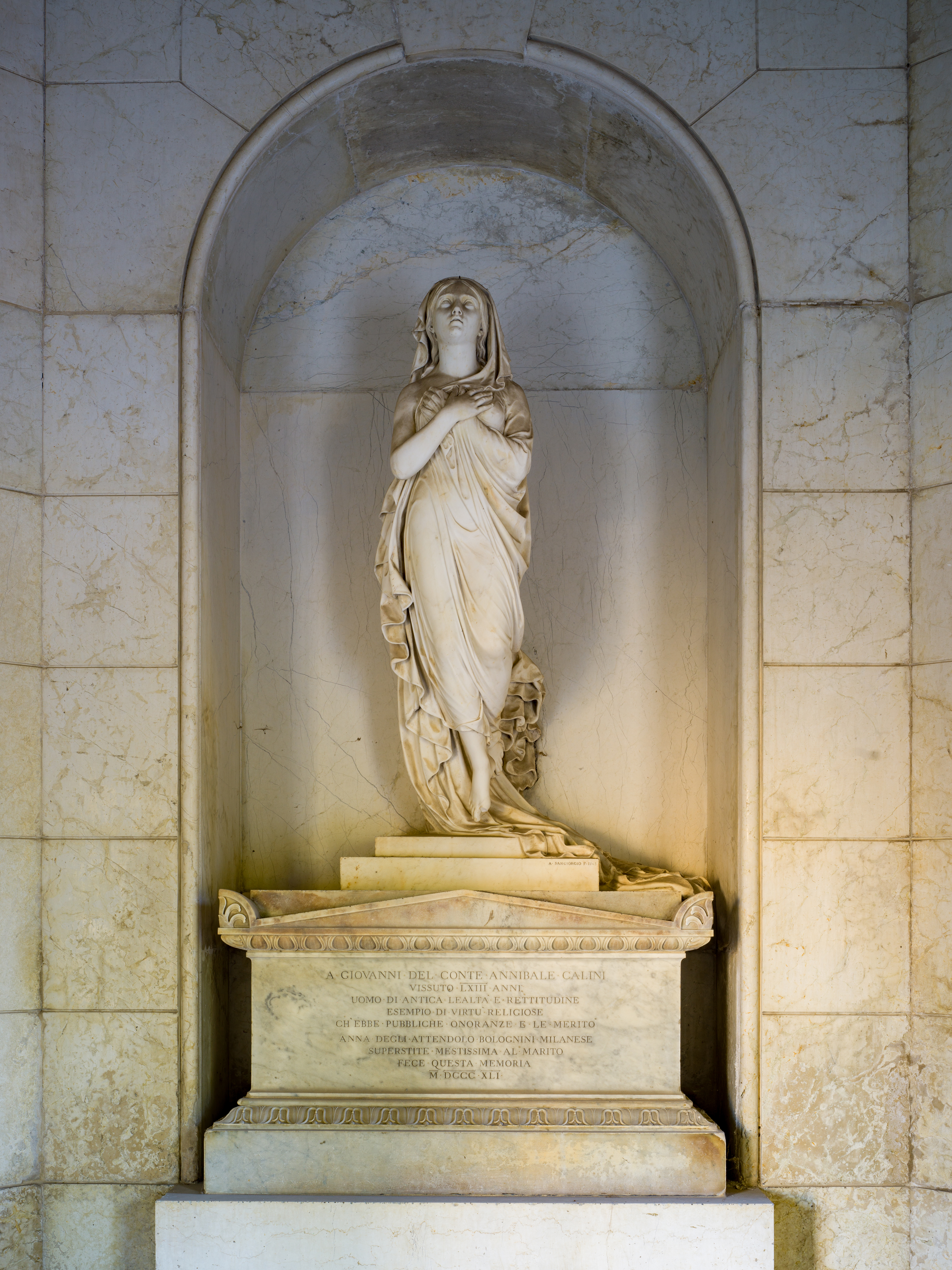
Annible Calini monument

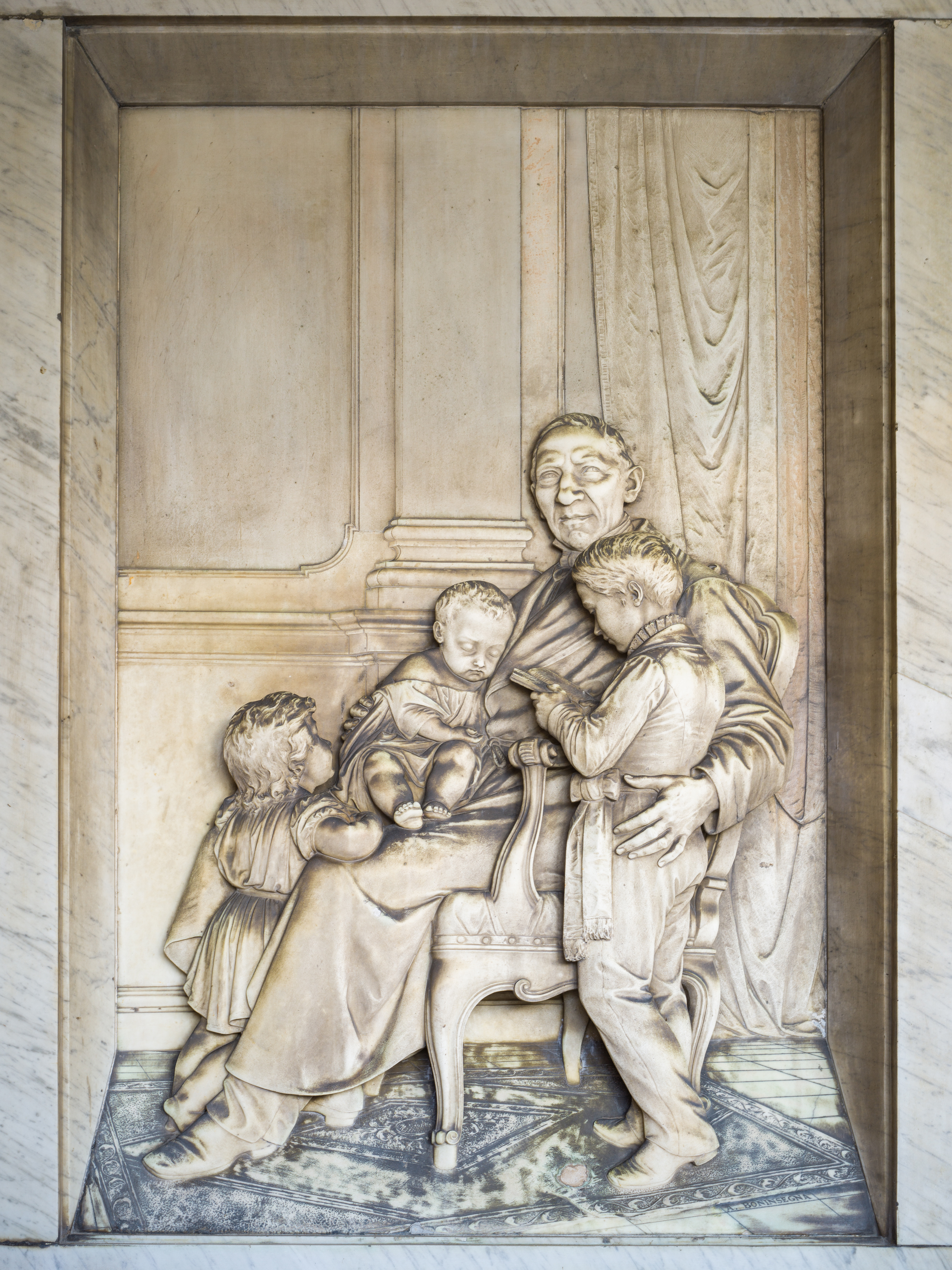
Facchi's family tomb

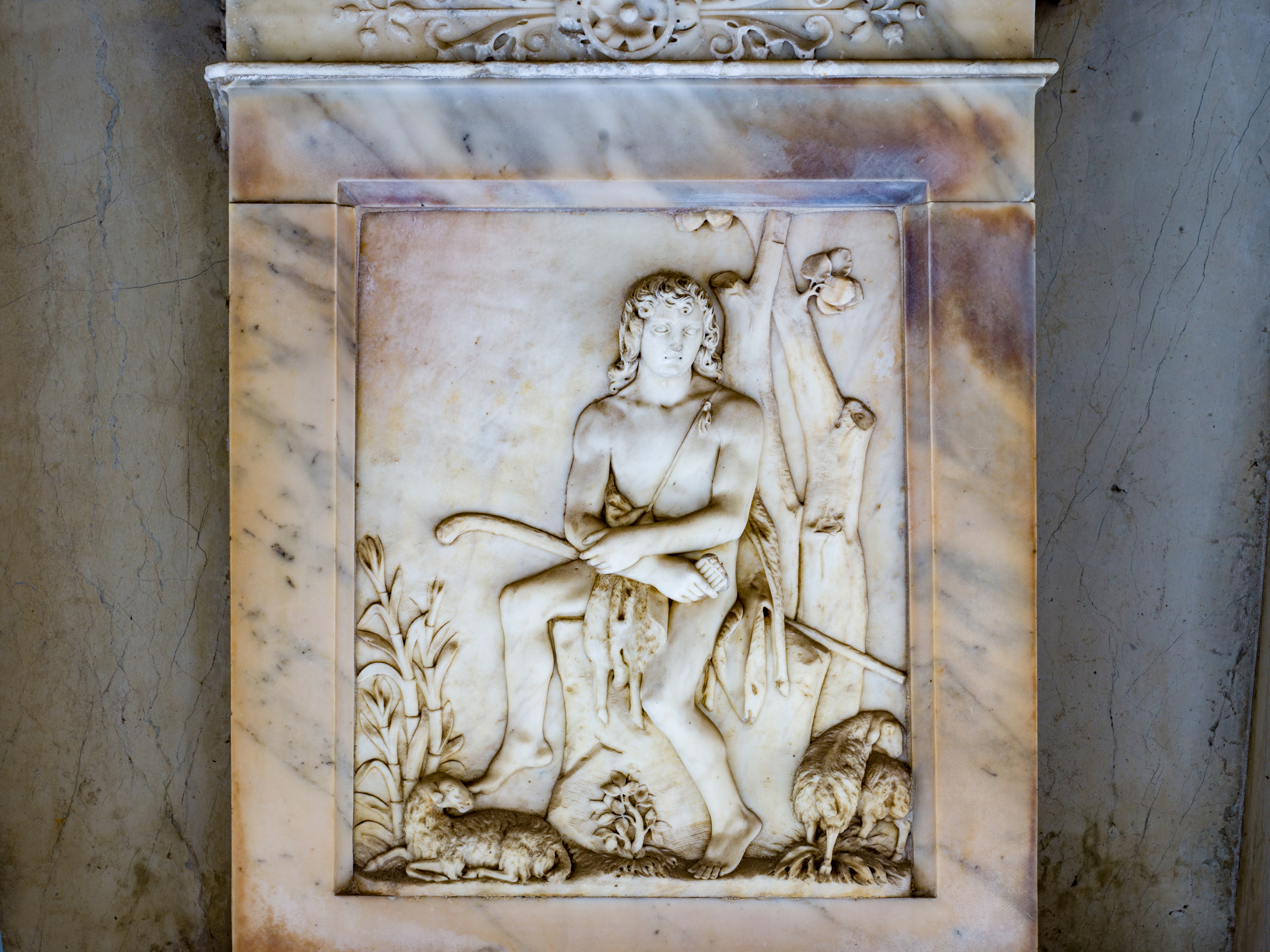
Cesare Arici monument

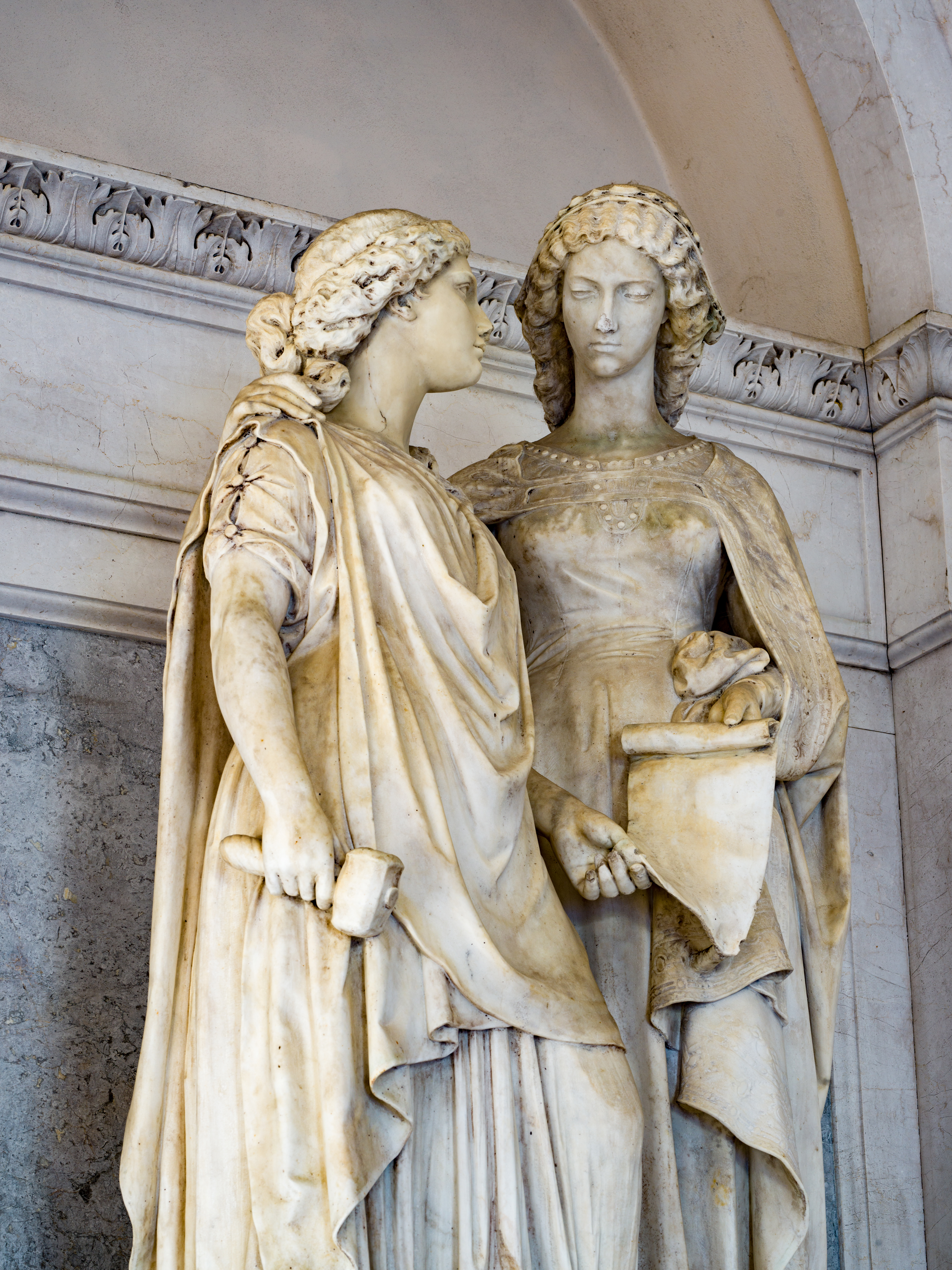
Giovan Battista Gigola monument

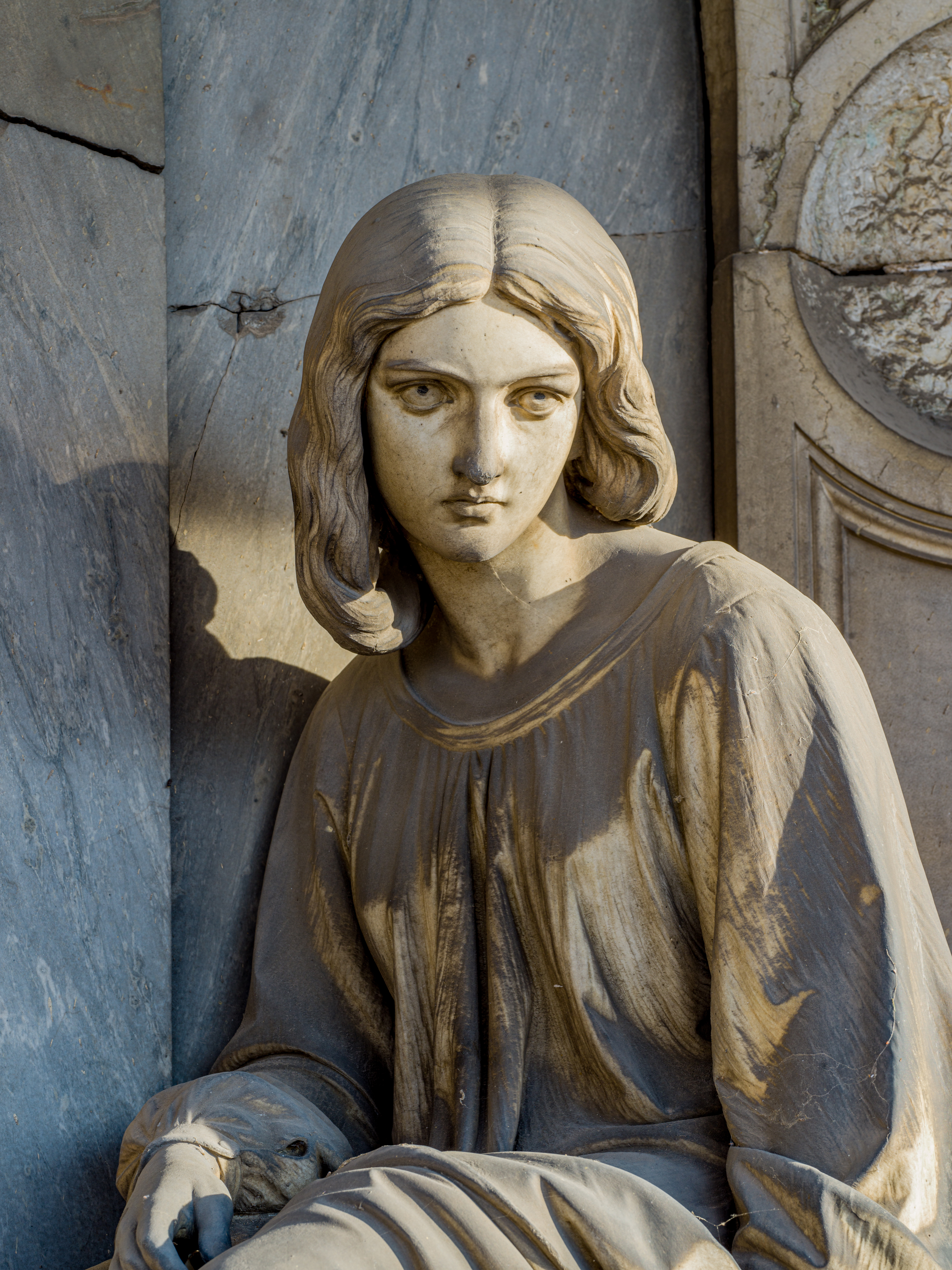
Pitozzi Baggi's family tomb

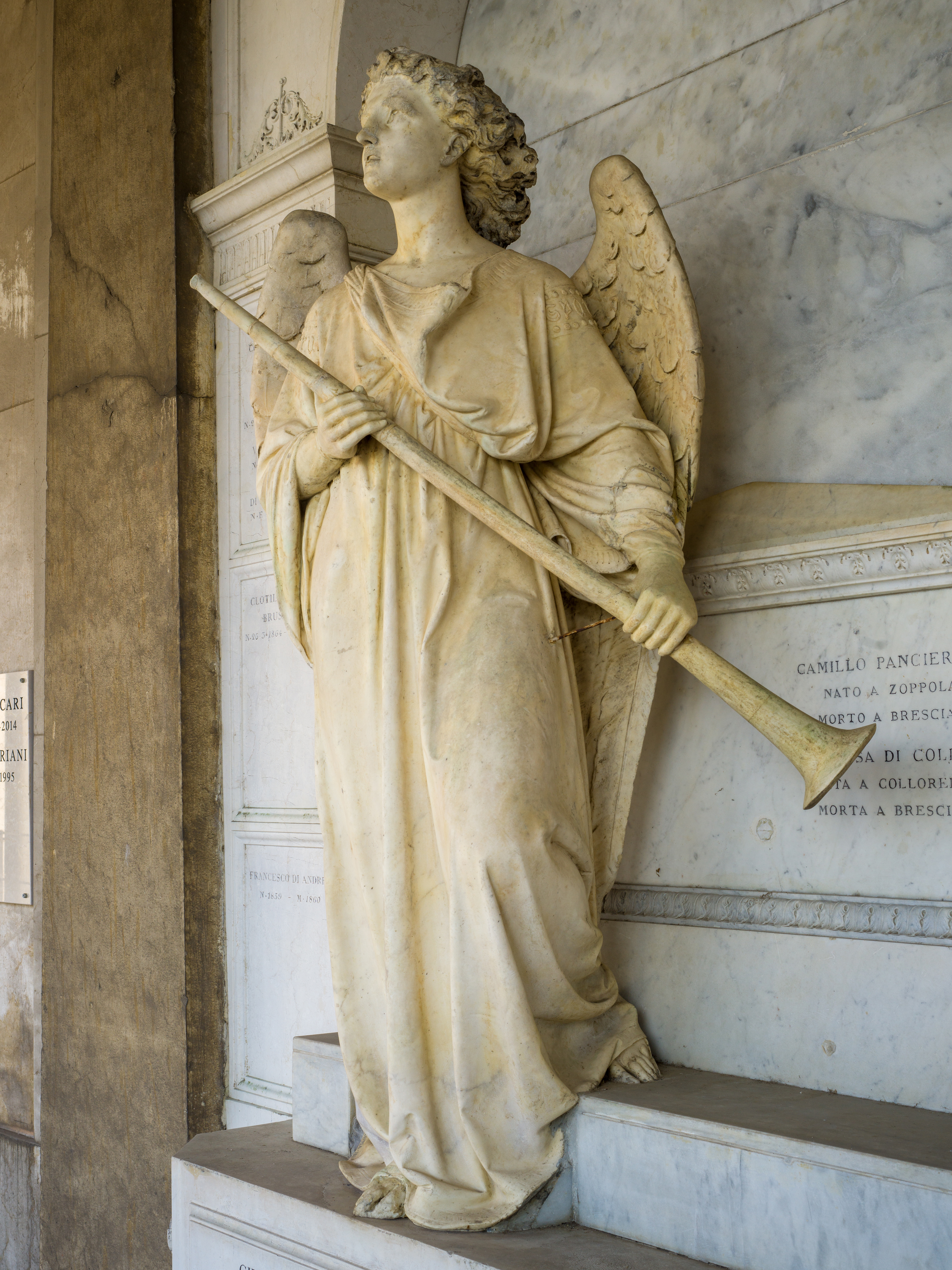
Panciera di Zoppola's family tomb

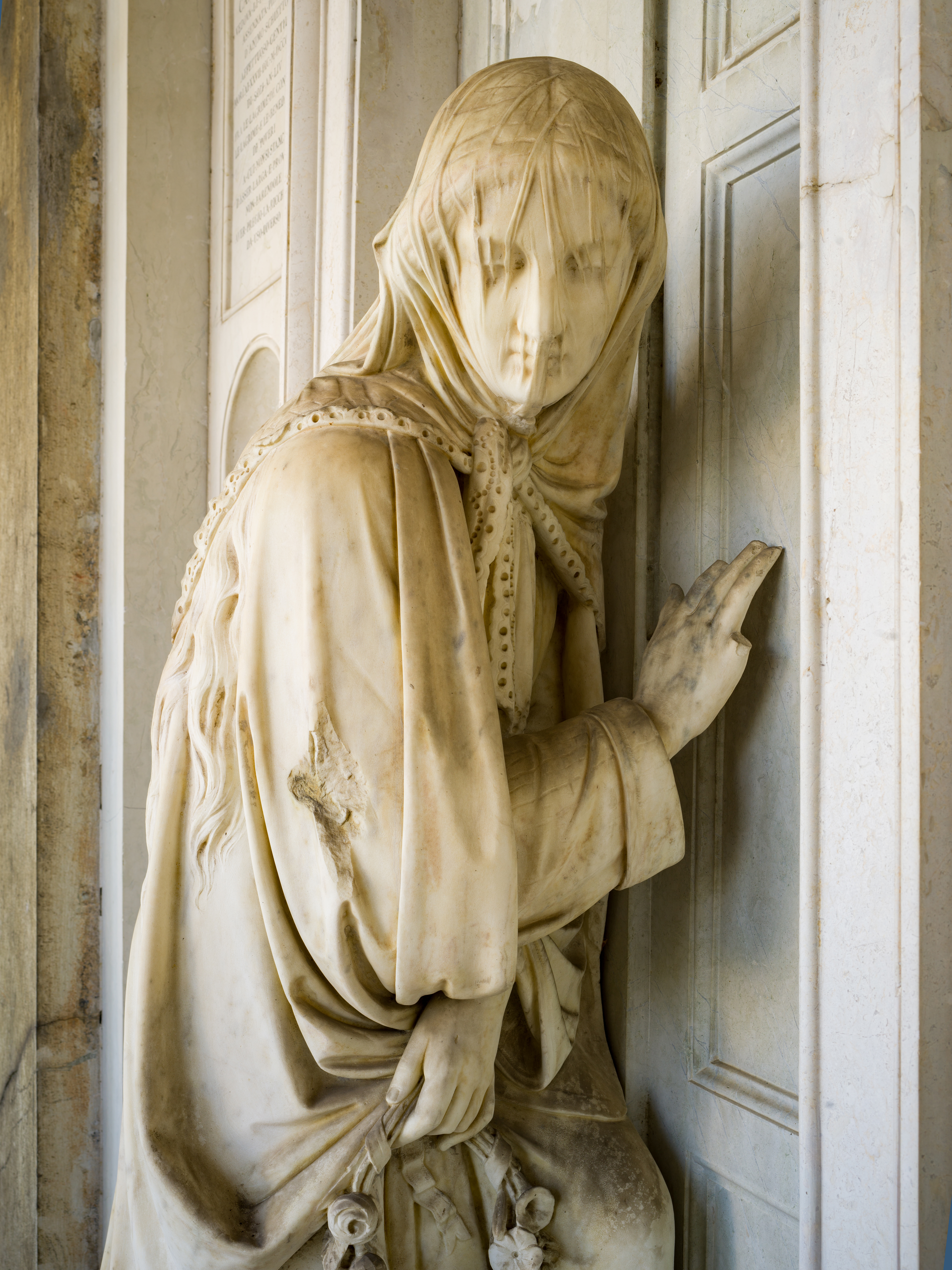
Dossi Rampinelli Spalenza's family tomb

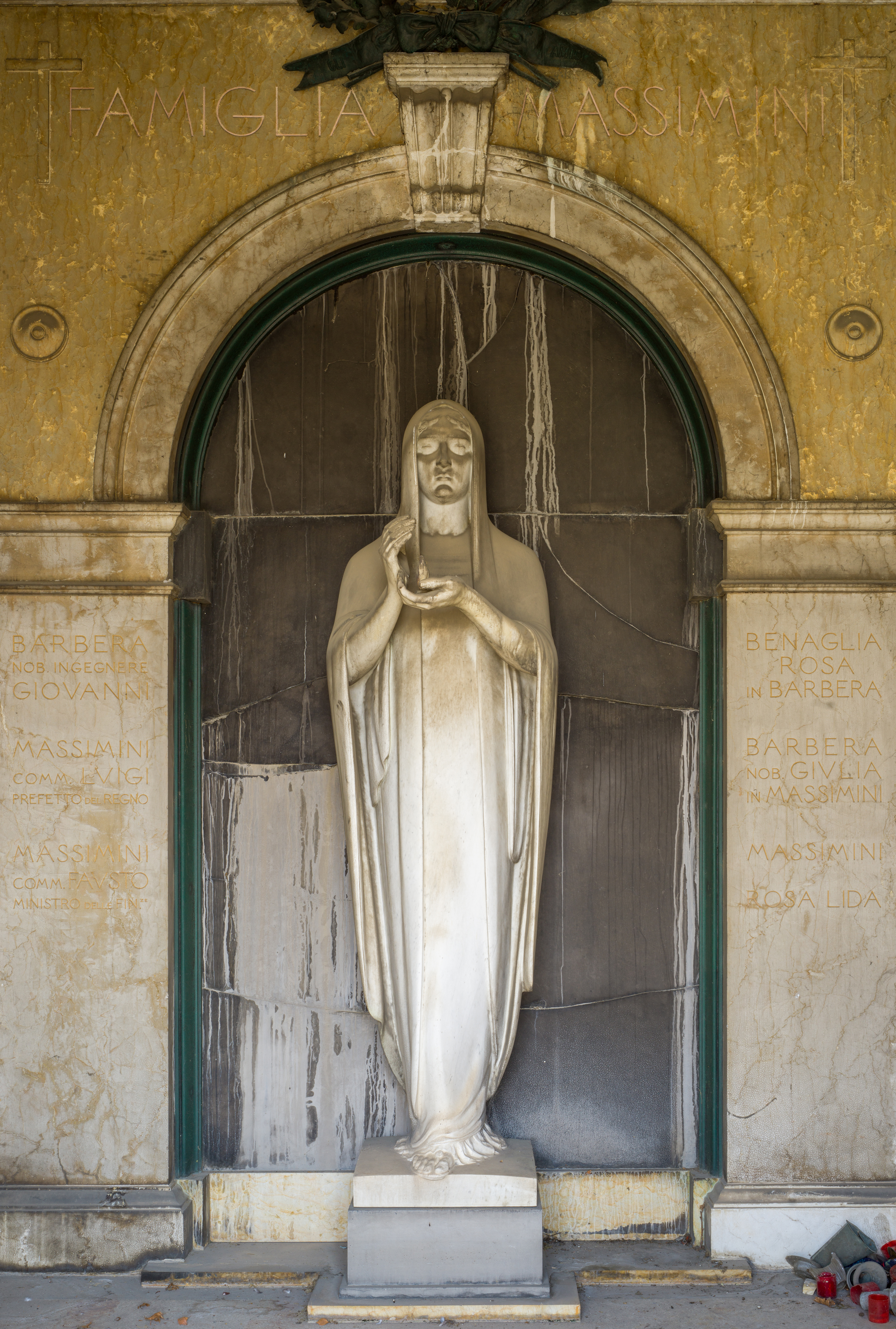
Massimini's family tomb

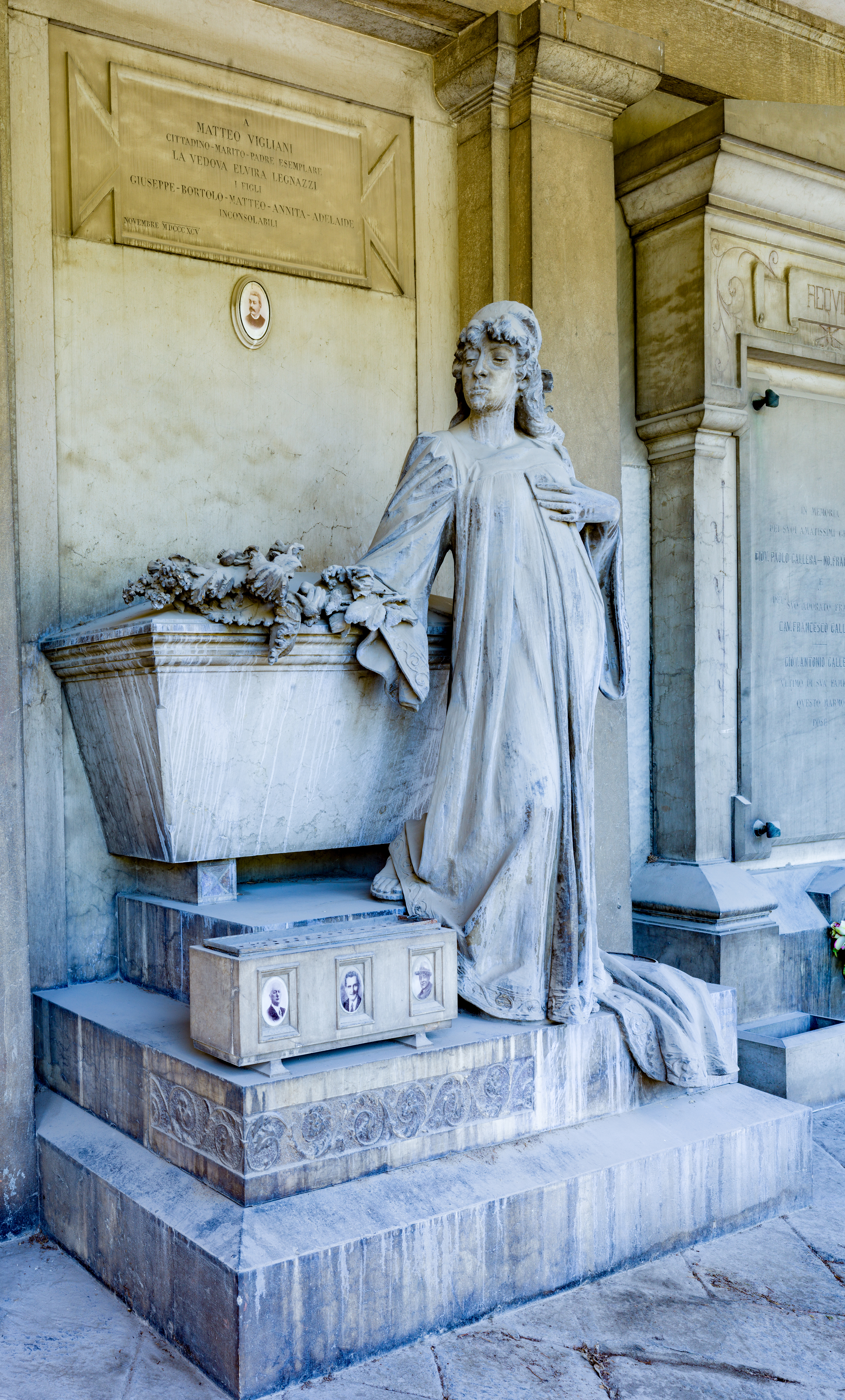
Vigliani's family tomb

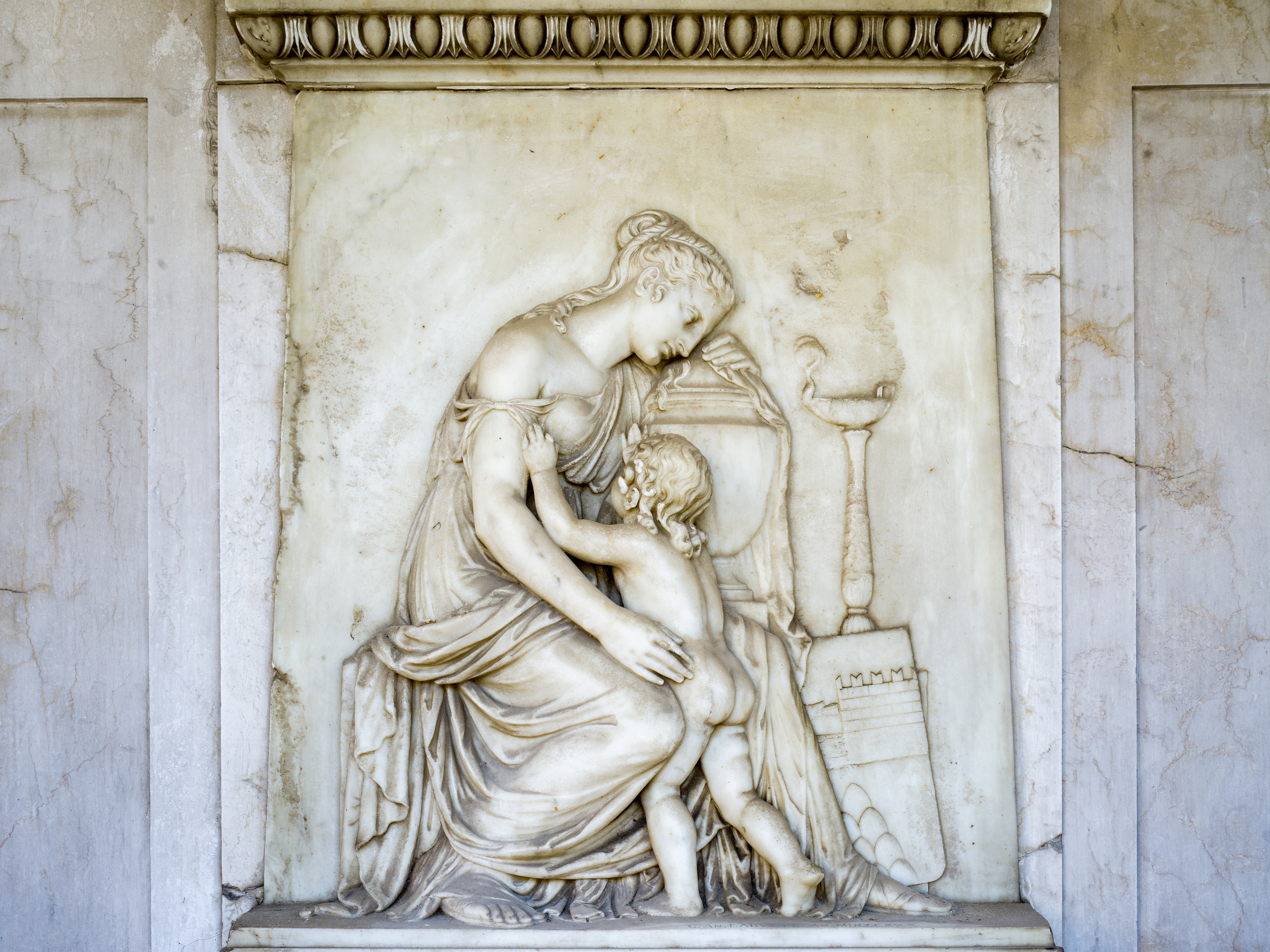
Monti della Corte's family tomb

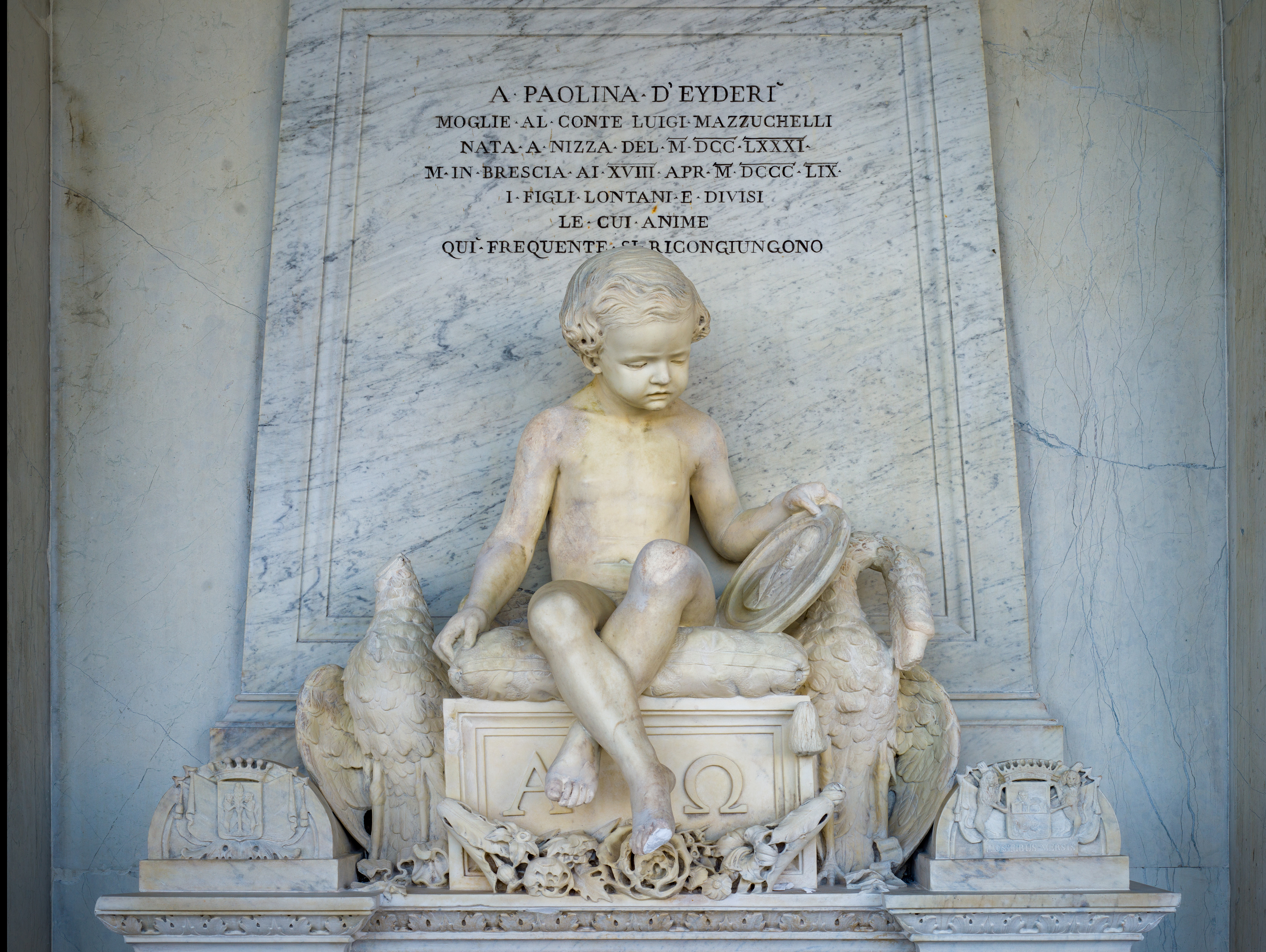
Mazzucchelli's family tomb

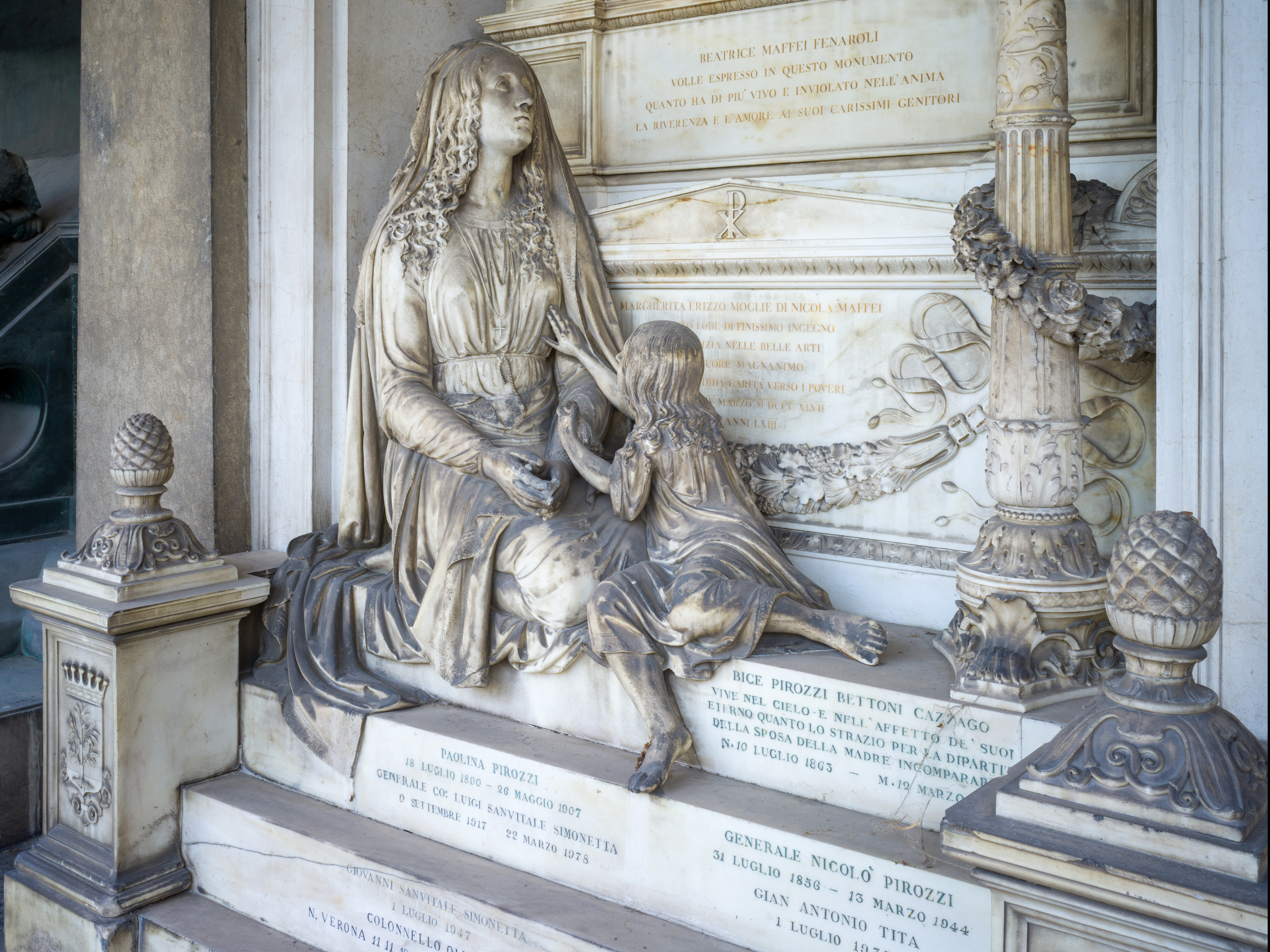
Maffei Erizzo's family tomb

== Gallery ==
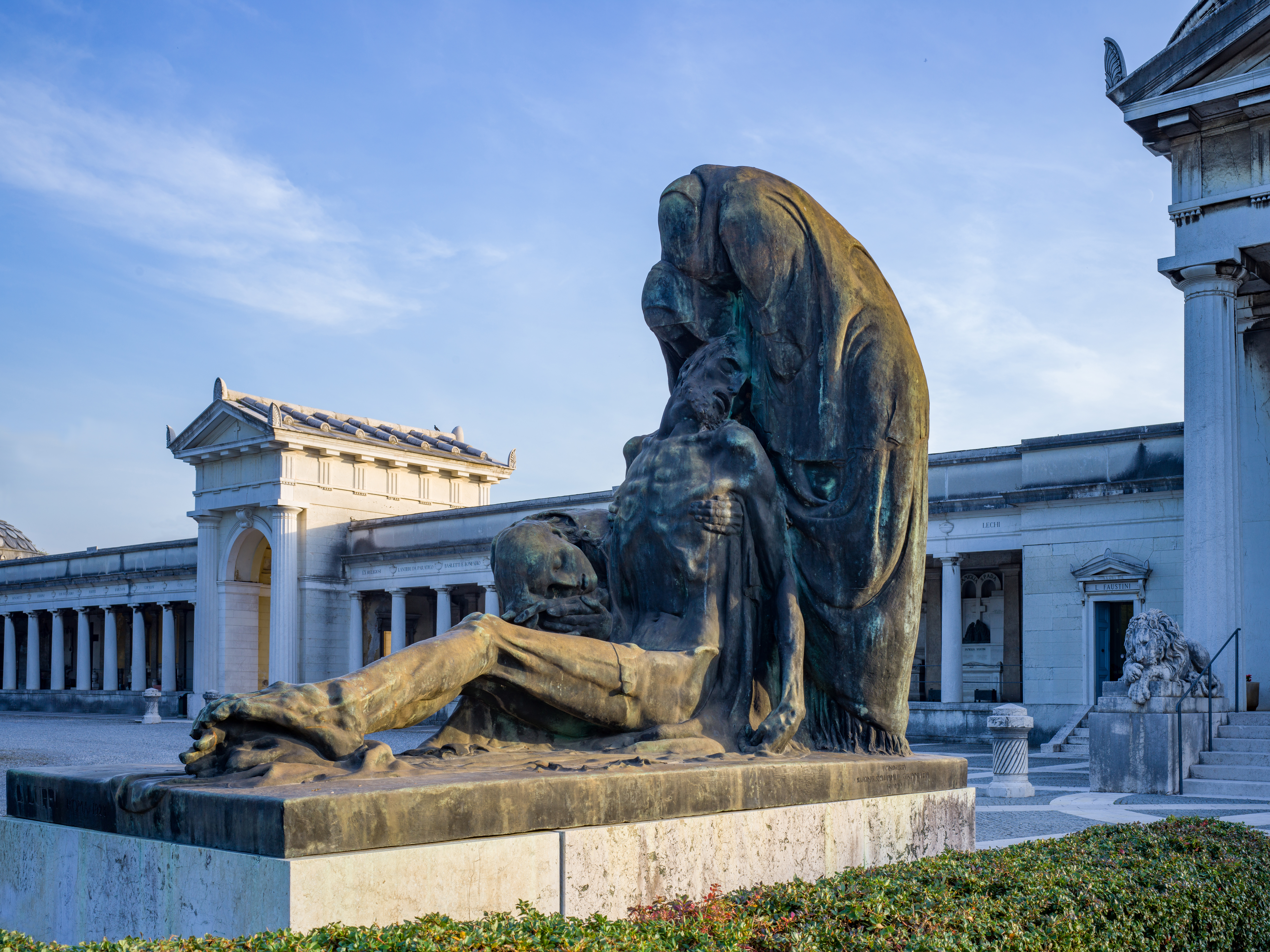
Pietà

Monument to the Fallen of World War I

St. Michael Church

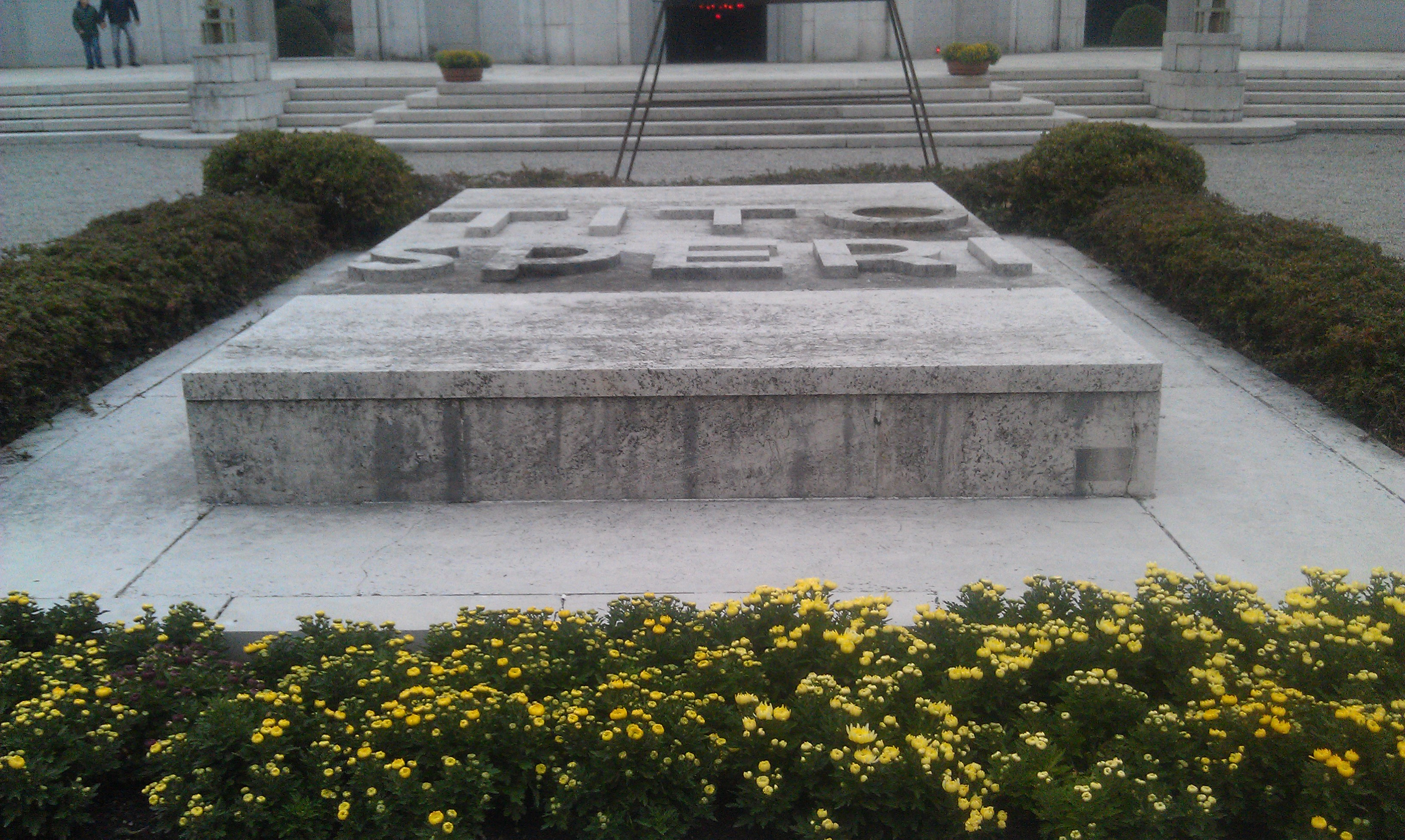
Tito Speri tomb

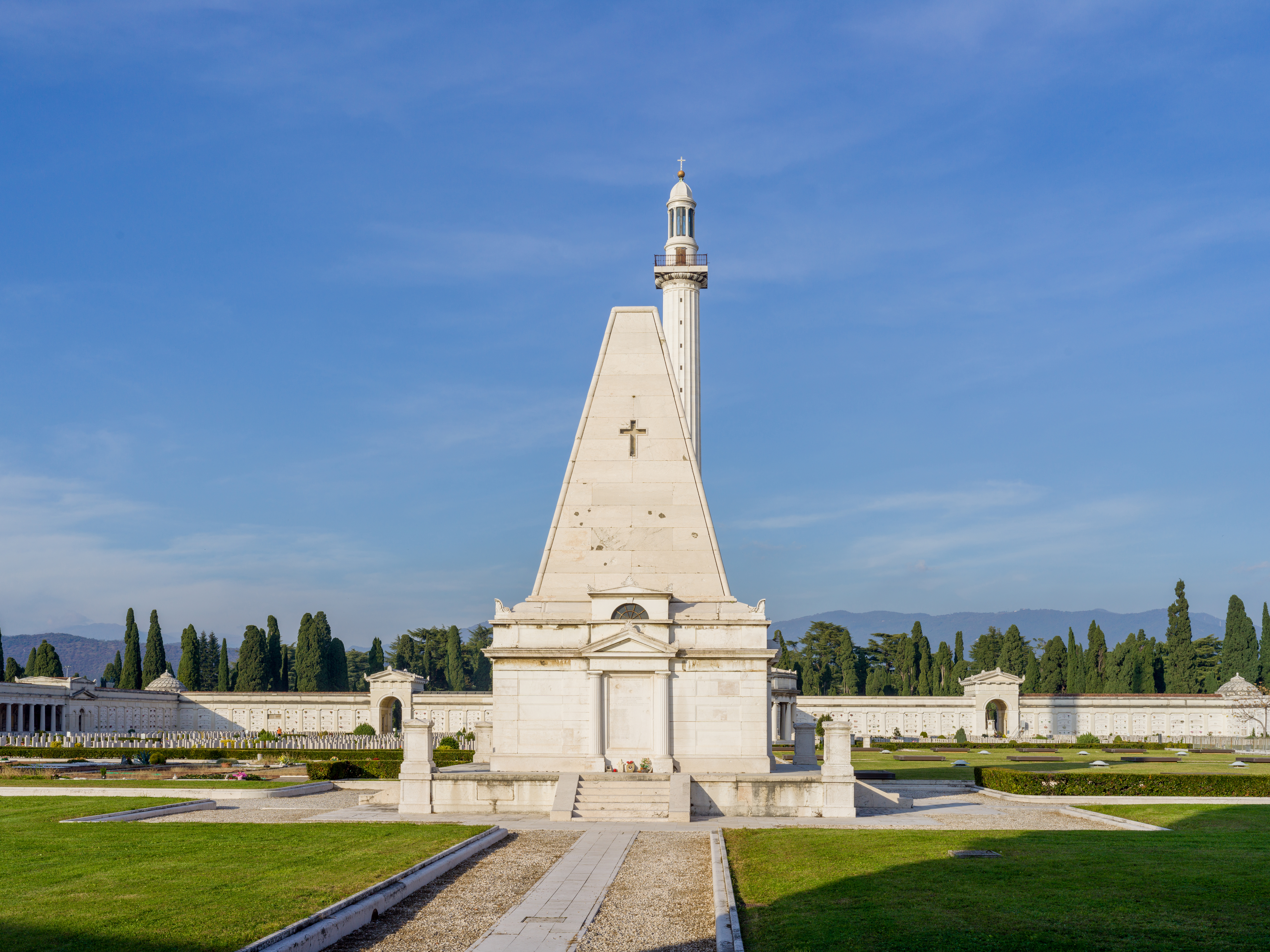
Don Bossini tomb

Eastern view

General view of the Cemetery

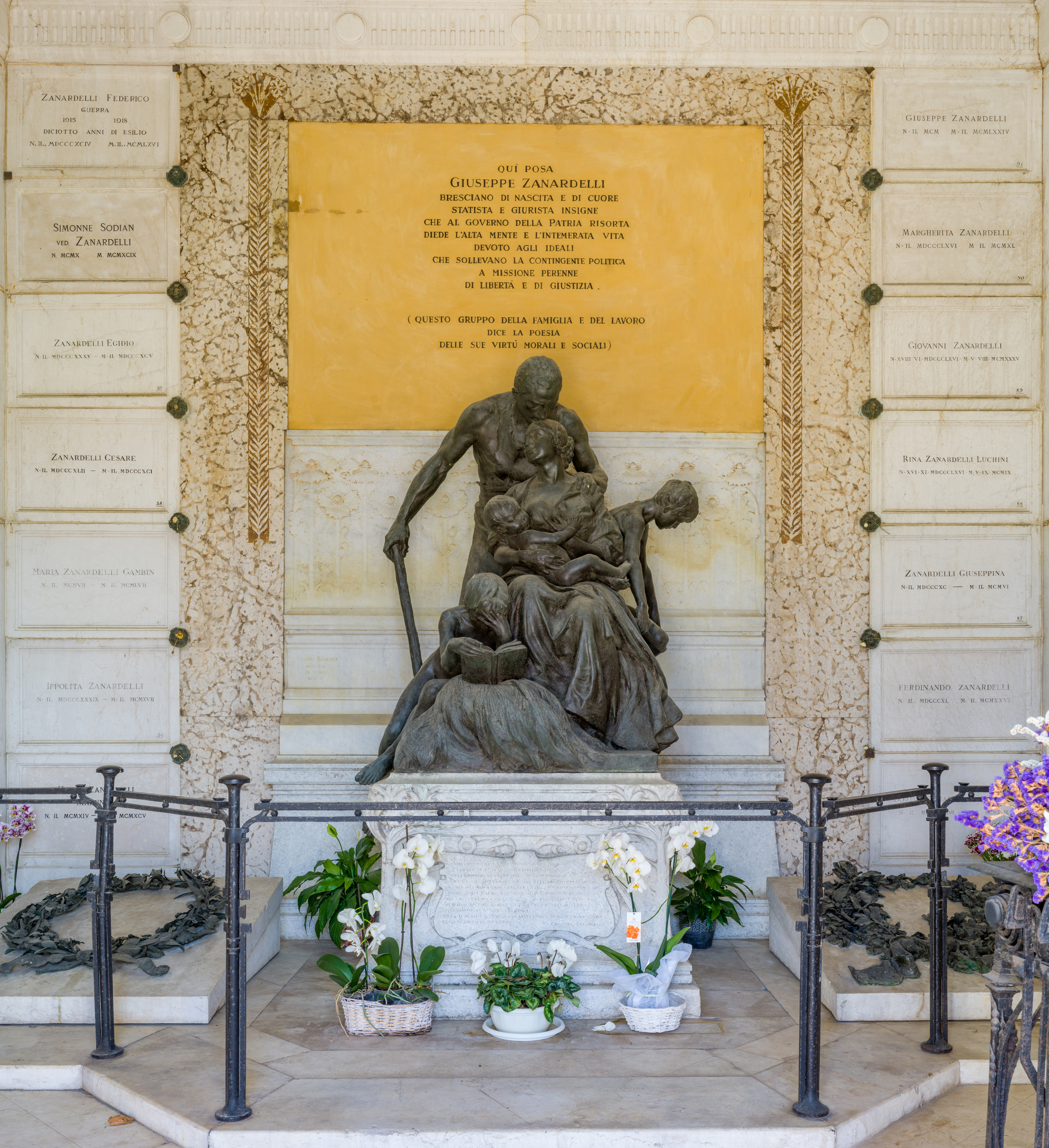
Tomb of Giuseppe Zanardelli

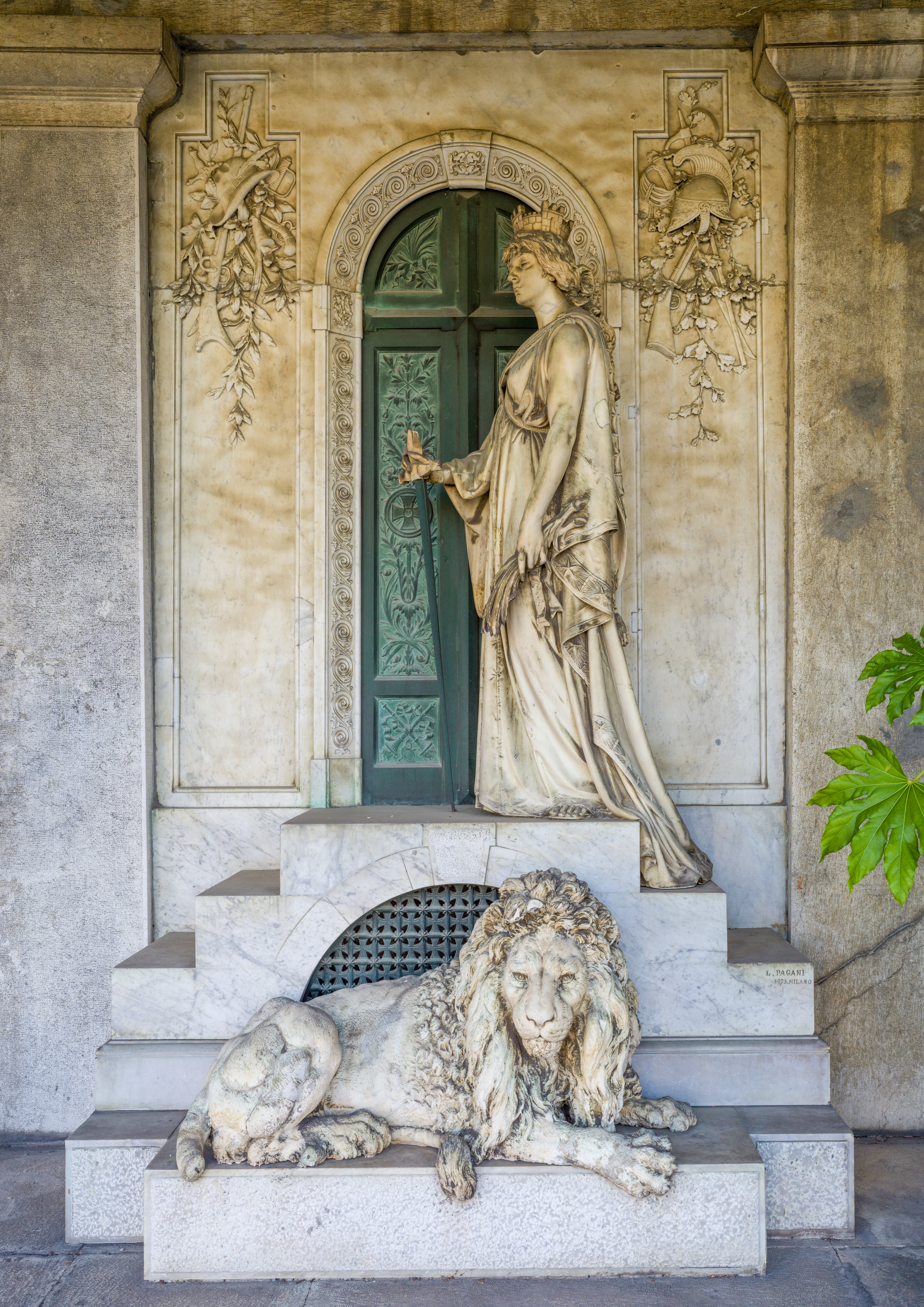
Prodi Bresciani monument

== See also ==
- List of cemeteries
- Rodolfo Vantini
- Berlin Victory Column
- Monumental Cemetery of Milan
