= Klemen =

Klemen is a Slovene masculine name derived from the Latin Clemens, meaning 'merciful'. Klemen is the 42nd most common men's name in Slovenia (as of 2016). It may refer to:

- Klemen Ferjan (born 1979), Slovenian judoka
- Klemen Klemen, Slovenian rap music artist
- Klemen Lavrič (born 1981), Slovenian footballer
- Klemen Pisk (born 1973), Slovenian poet, writer, translator and musician
- Klemen Slakonja (born 1985), Slovenian artist, actor and television host

== See also ==
- Clement (disambiguation)
- Klemens (given name), another given name
- Klemenčič, a surname
