= St. Clement's Church =

St. Clement's Church, St. Clement Church or variants may refer to:

== Australia ==
- St Clement's Anglican Church, Mosman, New South Wales
- St Clement's Church Eurobin, Victoria

== Barbados ==
- Saint Clement's Church, Barbados

== Belgium ==
- Church of St Clement, Watermael-Boitsfort, Brussels

== Canada ==
- St. Clement's Church (Toronto)
- St. Clement Parish (Ottawa)

== Czech Republic ==
- St. Clement's Cathedral, Prague

== Denmark ==
- St. Clement's Church, Bornholm
- St. Clement's Church, Rømø

== Germany ==
- St. Clement's Basilica, Hanover

== Italy ==
- San Clemente al Laterano, Rome
- San Clemente, Brescia

== Jersey ==
- Parish Church of St Clement

== Malta ==
- St Clement's Chapel, Żejtun

== North Macedonia ==
- Church of St. Clement of Ohrid, Skopje

== Norway ==
- St. Clement's Church, Oslo, now ruined

== Russia ==
- St Clement's Church, Moscow

== United Kingdom ==
England

- St Clement's Church, Bournemouth
- St Clement's Church, Cambridge
- St Clement's Church, Horsley, Derbyshire
- St Clement's Church, West Thurrock, Essex
- St Clement's Church, Chorlton-cum-Hardy, Greater Manchester
- St Clement's Church, Ordsall, Greater Manchester
- St Clement's Church, Knowlton, Kent
- St Clement's Church, Old Romney, Kent
- St Clement's Church, Sutton-on-Sea, Lincolnshire
- St Clement's, Eastcheap, City of London
- St Clement's Church, Ilford, London, now demolished
- St Clement's Church, King Square, Finsbury, London
- St Clement's Church, Notting Dale, Kensington, London
- St Clement Danes, Westminster, London
- Church of St Clement, Liverpool, Merseyside
- St Clement Colegate, Norwich, Norfolk
- St Clement's Church, Oxford
- St Clement's Church, Ipswich, Suffolk
- St Clement's Church, Nechells, Birmingham, West Midlands, now demolished
- St Clement's Church, York

Scotland

- St Clement's Church, Rodel, Harris

== United States ==
- St. Clement's Chapel, Tallahassee, Florida
- Saint Clement Catholic Church, Chicago, Illinois
- St. Clements Roman Catholic Church (Saratoga Springs, New York)
- Church of St. Clement Mary Hofbauer, New York City
- Saint Clement's Church (Philadelphia), Pennsylvania
- Anglican Church of St. Clement, El Paso, Texas

== See also ==
- Church of Sts. Clement and Panteleimon, Ohrid, North Macedonia
- St Clements (disambiguation)
