= Klemens =

Klemens may refer to:

- Klemens (given name)
- Klemens (surname)
- Klemens (video game) (1994) by TimSoft
