= Clemmensen =

Clemmensen is a surname. Notable people with the surname include:

- Andrew Clemmensen, member of Short Stack, an Australian rock band
- Charlotte Clemmensen (born 1992), Danish curler
- Ejgil Clemmensen (1890–1932), Danish rower who competed in the 1912 Summer Olympics
- Erik Christian Clemmensen, (1876–1941), Danish-American chemist
- Isabella Clemmensen (born 1996), Danish curler
- Karen Clemmensen née Mundt (1917–2001), Danish architect and designer
- Niels Clemmensen (1900–1950), Danish pianist and composer
- Scott Clemmensen (born 1977), American professional ice hockey goaltender
- Tove Clemmensen (1915–2006), Danish art historian and curator

== See also ==
- Clemmensen reduction, chemical reaction invented by Erik Christian Clemmensen
- Clemens (disambiguation)
- Clemmons, North Carolina
- Clemons (disambiguation)
- Clemson (disambiguation)
- Klemens (disambiguation)
