= Klemens (given name) =

Klemens is a German masculine given name, a variant of Clemens.

It may refer to:

- Saint Clement (disambiguation), various saints in a German context
- Klemens of Brzeźnica (died 1241), Polish nobleman, Voivode of Opole and Castellan of Kraków
- Klemens Frankowski (1916–1943), Polish footballer
- Klemens Janicki (1516–1543), Polish poet
- Klemens von Metternich (1773–1859), Austrian Chancellor of State and diplomat
- Klemens Zamoyski (1747–1767), Polish nobleman

== See also ==
- Klemen, a Slavic given name
- Klemens or Clemens, a German surname
- Saint Klemens (disambiguation), various places named for St Clement
