= Saint Klemens =

Saint Klemens (German and Greek for "St Clements") may refer to:

== Churches ==
- St Maria and Klemens, another name for the Doppelkirche Schwarzrheindorf in Bonn, North Rhine-Westphalia, Germany
- St Klemens, a parish church in Dogern, Waldshut-Tiengenn, Baden-Württemberg, Germany
- St Klemens, a parish church in Wipperfeld, Wipperfürth, North Rhine-Westphalia, Germany
- St Klemens, a parish church in Nadarzyn, Pruszków County, Masovia, Poland
- St Klemens, a parish church in Ustroń, Cieszyn Silesia, Poland
- St Klemens, a former cathedral in Saratov, Russia

== See also ==
- Klemens (given name) and Clemens
- Klemens (surname)
- Saint Clement (disambiguation) and Saint-Clément (disambiguation), the English and French forms of the name
- San Clemente (disambiguation), the Italian and Spanish form of the name
- São Clemente (disambiguation), the Portuguese form of the name
- Saint Kliment (disambiguation), the form of the name in several Slavic languages
