= São Clemente =

São Clemente (Portuguese for "Saint Clement") may refer to:

== Places ==
- São Clemente (Loulé), a civil parish in Loulé, Portugal
- São Clemente, a civil parish in Fafe, Braga, Portugal
- São Clemente de Basto, a civil parish in Celorico de Basto, Braga, Portugal
- Sande São Clemente, a civil parish in Guimarães, Braga, Portugal
- Fort São Clemente, Vila Nova de Milfontes, Odemira, Alentejo, Portugal

== Titles ==
- Viscount of São Clemente de Basto, a viscountcy in Portugal
- Baron of São Clemente, a barony in Portugal

== Entertainment ==
- São Clemente (school), a samba school in Rio de Janeiro, Brazil

== See also ==
- Saint Clement (disambiguation) (English) and Saint-Clément (French) forms of the same name
- San Clemente (disambiguation), the Spanish and Italian form of the same name
- Sveti Kliment (disambiguation), the form of the name in several Slavic languages
- Saint Klemens (disambiguation), the German and Greek form of the name
