= Klemenčič =

Klemenčič is a Slovene surname. Notable people with the surname include:

- Andrew Klemencic (1860–1906), Slovene anarchist and union organizer
- Blaža Klemenčič (born 1980), Slovenian cyclist
- Goran Klemenčič (born 1972), Slovenian lawyer and politician
- Ignacij Klemenčič (1853–1901), Slovenian physicist
- Janez Klemenčič (born 1971), Slovenian rower
- Jože Klemenčič (born 1962), Slovenian cross-country skier
- Polona Klemenčič (born 1997), Slovenian biathlete, sister of Živa
- Tilen Klemenčič (born 1995), Slovenian footballer
- Valentina Klemenčič (born 2002), Slovenian handball player
- Živa Klemenčič (born 2001), Slovenian biathlete, sister of Polona
- Zoran Klemenčič (born 1976), Slovenian cyclist

== See also ==
- Klemencice, a village in south-central Poland
- Klemen
