= Saint Kliment (disambiguation) =

Saint Kliment, Sveti Kliment, or Sv. Kliment is the Bulgarian, Macedonian, Serbian, and Slovak form of the name "Saint Clement", particularly in reference to Saint Kliment of Ohrid.

It may also refer to:

== Education ==
- Saint Kliment University, another name for the University of Sofia
- Saint Kliment Library in Skopje, North Macedonia

== Places ==
- Church of Sts. Clement and Panteleimon in Ohrid, North Macedonia
- St. Kliment's Church, another name for St. Clement's Cathedral, Prague, Czech Republic
- St. Kliment Ohridski Base, Antarctica

== Celebrations ==
- St Kliment's Day, a national holiday in North Macedonia on December 8

== See also ==
- Saint Clement (disambiguation) (English) and Saint-Clément (French) forms of the name
- San Clemente (disambiguation), the Italian and Spanish form of the name
- São Clemente (disambiguation), the Portuguese form of the name
- Saint Klemens (disambiguation), the German and Greek form of the name
- Kliment (disambiguation)
