= Saint Clement =

Saint Clement, St Clement's or variants may refer to:

== People ==
- Clement of Sardice (1st century) of the Seventy Apostles
- Clement of Rome or Pope Clement I (died c. 98)
  - Saint Clement's Day
- Clement of Metz (?), first bishop of Metz
- Clement of Alexandria (c. 150 – c. 215), Christian theologian and philosopher
- Willibrord (c. 658 – 739), consecrated bishop with the name of "Clement"
- Clement of Ireland (born c. 750), active in the Paris Schools
- Clement of Ohrid (c. 840 – 916), scholar, writer and enlightener of the Slavs
- Clement Mary Hofbauer (1751–1820), co-founder of the Redemptorists

== Places ==
=== Canada ===
- Saint-Clément, Quebec
- St. Clement Parish (Ottawa)
- Rural Municipality of St. Clements, Manitoba
  - St. Clements (electoral district)
- St. Clements, Ontario
- St. Clement's School, in Toronto, Ontario

=== France ===
- Saint-Clément, Aisne, in the Aisne department
- Saint-Clément, Allier, in the Allier department
- Saint-Clément, Ardèche, in the Ardèche department
- Saint-Clément, former commune of the Calvados department, now part of Osmanville
- Saint-Clément, Cantal, in the Cantal department
- Saint-Clément, former name of the commune of Cabariot (Charente-Maritime)
- Saint-Clément, Corrèze, in the Corrèze department
- Saint-Clément, former commune of the Dordogne department, now part of Saint-Romain-et-Saint-Clément
- Saint-Clément, Gard, in the Gard department
- Saint-Clément, former commune of the Lot department, now part of Cézac
- Saint-Clément, former commune of the Manche department, now part of Saint-Clément-Rancoudray
- Saint-Clément, former commune of the Mayenne department, now part of Craon
- Saint-Clément, Meurthe-et-Moselle, in the Meurthe-et-Moselle department
- Saint-Clément, former commune of the Oise department, now part of Morienval
- Saint-Clément, former commune of the Saône-et-Loire department, now part of Mâcon
- Saint-Clément, Yonne, in the Yonne department
- Saint-Clément-à-Arnes, in the Ardennes department
- Saint-Clément-de-la-Place, in the Maine-et-Loire department
- Saint-Clément-de-Régnat, in the Puy-de-Dôme] department
- Saint-Clément-de-Rivière, in the Hérault department
- Saint-Clément-des-Baleines, in the Charente-Maritime department
- Saint-Clément-des-Levées, in the Maine-et-Loire department
- Saint-Clément-de-Valorgue, in the Puy-de-Dôme department
- Saint-Clément-de-Vers, in the Rhône department
- Saint-Clément-les-Places, in the Rhône department
- Saint-Clément-Rancoudray, in the Manche department
- Saint-Clément-sur-Durance, in the Hautes-Alpes department
- Saint-Clément-sur-Guye, in the Saône-et-Loire department
- Saint-Clément-sur-Valsonne, in the Rhône department

=== United Kingdom and Channel Islands ===
- St Clement, Cornwall, England
- St Clement's Isle, Cornwall, England
- St Clement's, Oxford, England
- Terrington St Clement, Norfolk, England
  - St Clement's High School
- St Clement, Jersey

=== Other countries ===
- Sant Climent de Llobregat, Catalonia, Spain
- Saint Clement, Missouri, U.S.
- St. Clement's Island State Park, Maryland, U.S.

== Other uses ==
- St Clement (hymn tune)
- St Clement's Church (disambiguation)
- St Clement's Hospital, London, England
- St. Clements University, Turks and Caicos Islands
- St. Clement S.C., a football club in Jersey

== See also ==
- San Clemente (disambiguation), the Italian and Spanish form of the name
- São Clemente (disambiguation), the Portuguese form of the name
- Sveti Kliment (disambiguation), the form of the name in several Slavic languages
- Saint Klemens (disambiguation), the German and Greek form of the name
- Oranges and Lemons (Say the bells of St. Clement's), a nursery rhyme
