= San Clemente High School =

San Clemente High School may refer to:

- San Clemente High School (California), a public high school in San Clemente, California, USA
- San Clemente High School (Mayfield, New South Wales), a Roman Catholic school in Mayfield, New South Wales, Australia
