= Saint-Clément-Rancoudray =

- Commune
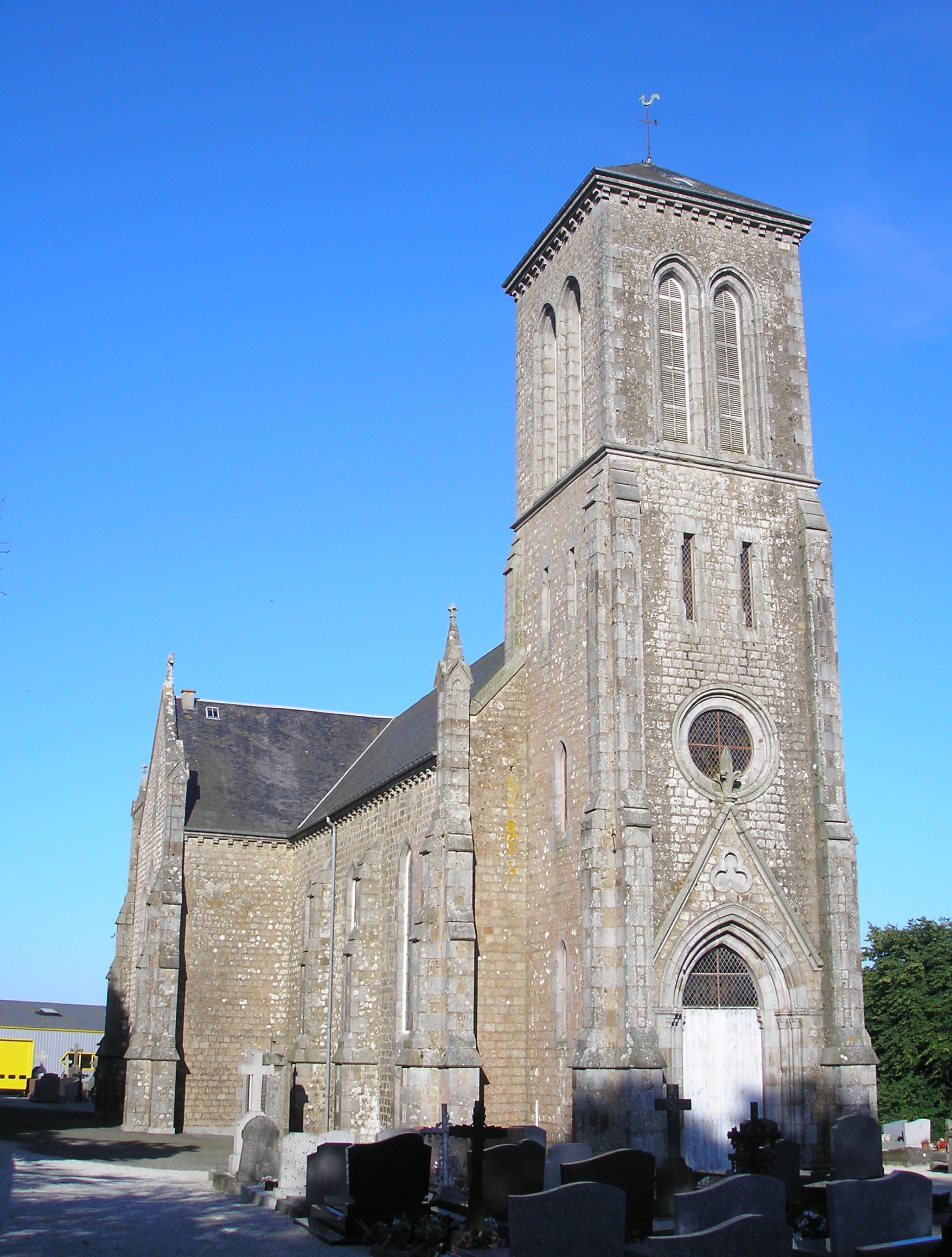
- The church of Saint-Clément
- Location of Saint-Clément-Rancoudray
- Location within France Location within Normandy
- Coordinates: 48°40′30″N 0°53′06″W
- Country: France
- Region: Normandy
- Department: Manche
- Arrondissement: Avranches
- Canton: Le Mortainais
- Intercommunality: CA Mont-Saint-Michel-Normandie

Government
  - Mayor (2020–2026): Jean-Paul Brionne
- Area^{1}: 32.1 km^{2} (12.4 sq mi)
- Elevation: 315 m (1,033 ft)
- Highest elevation: 321 m (1,053 ft)
- Lowest elevation: 225 m (738 ft)
- Population (2023): 555
  - Density: 17.3/km^{2} (44.8/sq mi)
- Time zone: UTC+01:00 (CET)
  - Summer (DST): UTC+02:00 (CEST)
- INSEE/Postal code: 50456 /50140
- ^{1} French Land Register data, which excludes lakes, ponds, glaciers > 1 km^{2} (0.386 sq mi or 247 acres) and river estuaries.

Saint-Clément-Rancoudray (French pronunciation: [sɛ̃ klemɑ̃ ʁɑ̃kudʁɛ]) is a commune in Manche, a department in Normandy in northwestern France.

== See also ==
- Communes of the Manche department
