= Klemen Pisk =

- Born: 31 July 1973 (age 52) Kranj, Slovenia
- Occupation: Poet, writer, translator, musician

Klemen Pisk (born 31 July 1973) is a Slovenian poet, writer, translator and musician.

== Life and work ==
In the mid-1990s, Pisk was a member of the editorial staff of the main Slovene student newspaper Tribuna. While studying Slavistics in Ljubljana, he devoted most of his time to the Polish language and literature.

As a poet, he entered the Slovenian literary scene with his first collection Labas vakaras (Good Evening, 1998), followed by Visoko in nagubano prapočelo (High and Wrinkled Primordial Substance, 2000) and Mojster v spovednici (Master in the Confessional Box, 2002).

From 2000 to 2004, he wrote book reviews for the daily newspaper Delo and Radiotelevizija Slovenija (Radio-Television Slovenia). Pisk's short story Vilnius was published in the American literary journal Fiction Fix in 2009 and received the Editor's Choice Award. In July 2012, he performed at the Authors' Reading Month festival, which was organized by the Czech publishing house Větrné mlýny which took place in Brno, Košice, Ostrava and Wrocław. In 2014, he was chosen as a resident of Villa Sarkia in Sysmä by the Finnish culture association Nuoren Voiman Liitto. Pisk's literary works have been translated into many languages and published in more than 20 foreign literary magazines (Manuskripte, Lichtungen, Lituanus, Tvar, Arkadia, Fiction Fix etc). Translations of his books were published in Poland, Slovakia, Czech Republic and in the United States.

In the spring of 2003, he received the Institute of Cultural studies' scholarship in Warsaw as a literary translator from Polish. From 2006 to 2009, he lived in Vilnius where he was perfecting his Lithuanian language. In 2009 he attended the 2nd World Congress of Translators of Polish Literature. In October 2015, he received the Award of Lithuanian Cultural Institute for merit at the promotion of Lithuanian literature in the world.

He is a singer, guitarist and author of most songs for the band Žabjak Trio, their published albums include Doktor piska počasni sving (The Doctor Pipes the Slow Swing) and Aristokrat (Aristocrat, 2004).

== Selected bibliography ==
Poetry

- Labas vakaras (Good evening), 1998
- Visoko in nagubano prapočelo (High and Wrinkled Primordial Substance), 2000
- Mojster v spovednici (Master in the Confessional Box), 2002

Short stories

- Pihalec (The Blower), 2008

Radio drama

- Lahko noč, Matija Čop (Good night, Matija Čop), 1997
- Ose pa ne letijo (And the Wasps Don't Fly), 1999
- Pihalec (The Blower), 2012

Literary critics

- Stihi pod nadzorom (The Poems under Control), 2004

Translated works

- Tych kilka słów (translated into Polish by Marcin Mielczarek), 2005
- Pustovník a vlk (translated into Slovak by Saša Poklač in Miloslav Vojtech), 2009
- Vilnius (translated into English by Shay Robert Wood), 2010
- Za krzakiem majaczącego ślimaka (translated into Polish by Marlena Gruda), 2015
- Foukač (translated into Czech by Petr Mainuš), 2015
