= San Clemente Dormitory =

The San Clemente Dormitory is a public dormitory, depending on Universidad de Santiago de Compostela and located in the same city.

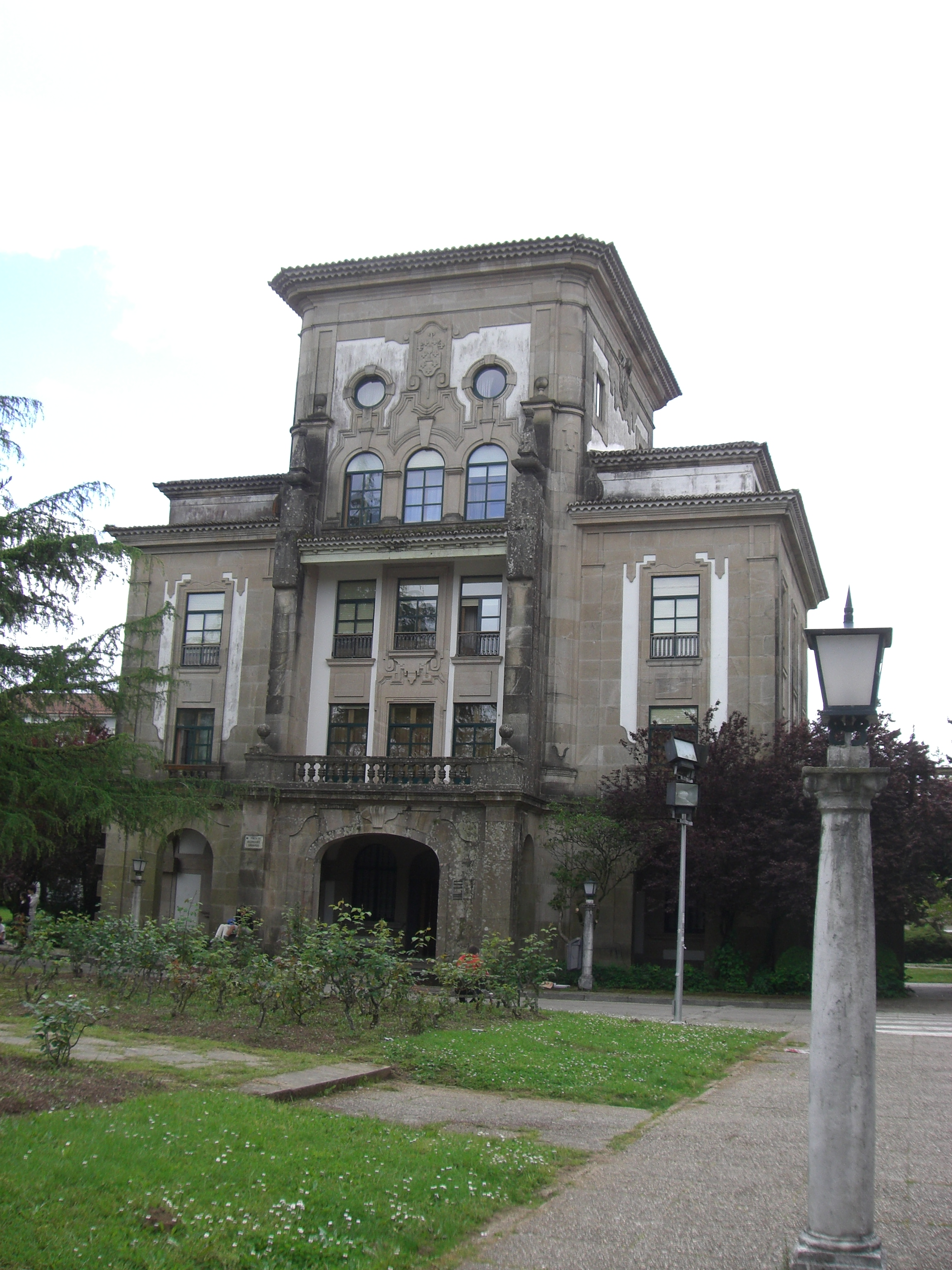
Front Wall

== Origins ==
The origin of the dormitory goes as far as the 16th century when Bishop Juan de San Clemente founded a dormitory in modern-day Rosalia de Castro High School.

During the Second Spanish Republic, the then dean of the university, Alejandro Rodríguez Cadarso, brought about the construction of five student dormitories. Due to lack of funds, only three of those were built: Colegios Mayores Fonseca (1963), Rodríguez Cadarso(1940) y San Clemente(1942).

== Organization ==
This dormitory has 41 double rooms and 20 single rooms, 5 guest rooms. There are fewer residents than places due to bureaucratic reasons. Besides the rooms, the dormitory has two libraries, one auditorium, a big multiple-use room, a kitchen, a computer room and a TV room.

Currently this dormitory is under the jurisdiction of the department of university community of the university. This institution appoints the principal, the subprincipal and is in charge of admission of students. Dormitory Council (Consello Colexial) is in charge of representing members of the dormitory before the principal, as well of organising parties. It is formed by five members democratically chosen every year.

The dormitory also give scholarships to some residents to organize certain activities: Green events, library, sports, computer science and sociocultural events. These scholarships are granted by the University and their duty is to develop the activities stated in these projects. Their work is rewarded with free tuition and a small salary.

== Cultural activities ==
A Colegio Mayor is traditionally distinguished from a Residencia Universitarial by its cultural activities. Besides the activities organized by the scholarships, the San Clemente Culture Association, formed by members of the Dormitory, holds conferences during the month of March. It also gives the "Galician person of the year" award, which Ernesto Chao, Avelino Pousa Antelo or Marilar Aleixandre have recently received.

A tradition of this dormitory is to have two weeks in the year with plenty of activities, competitions, dinners and parties. These are the week of the tree in December and Clementines in spring.
