= Rodolfo Vantini =

Italian architect

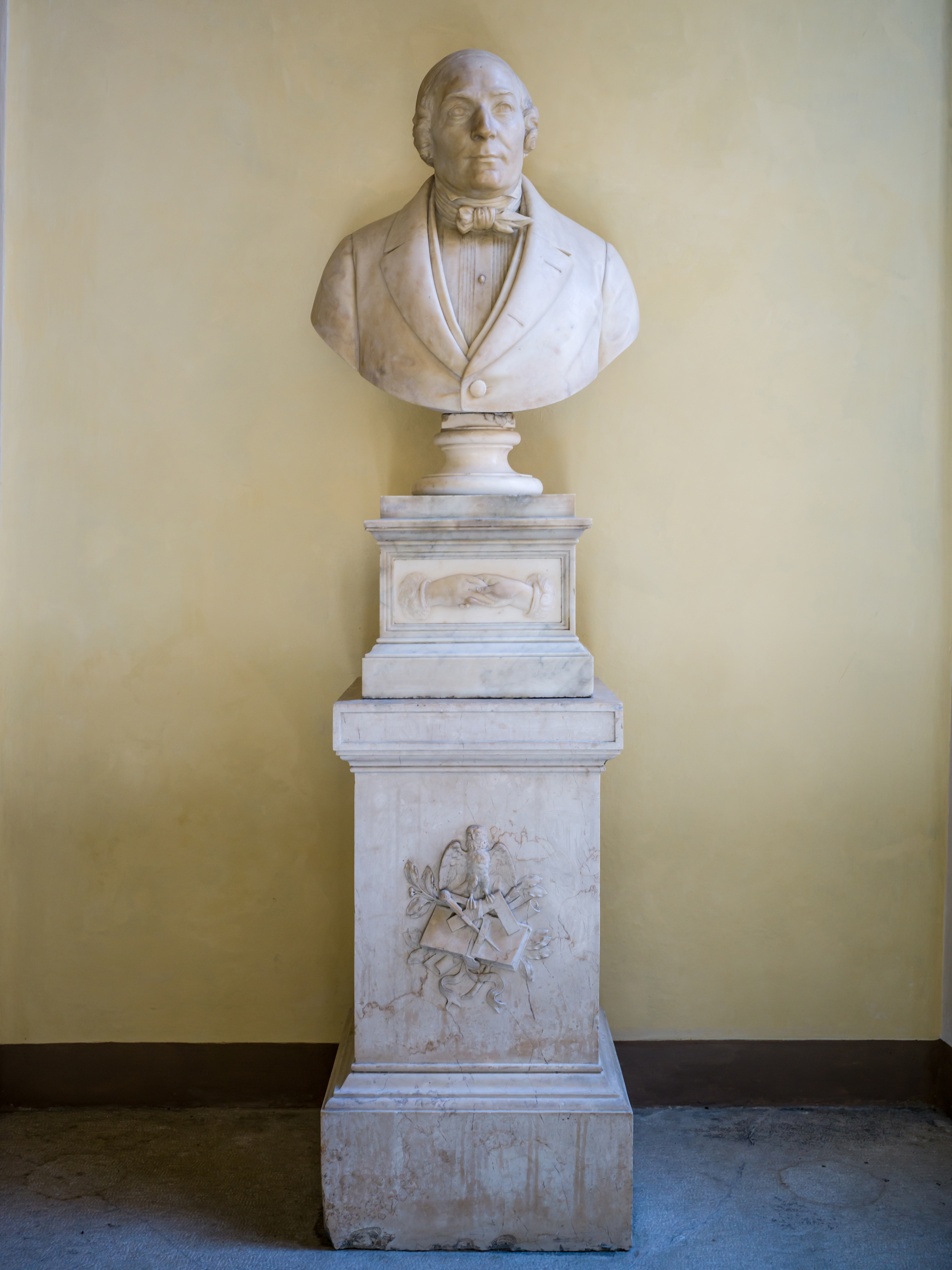
Bust of the architect in the Palazzo Tosio in Brescia.

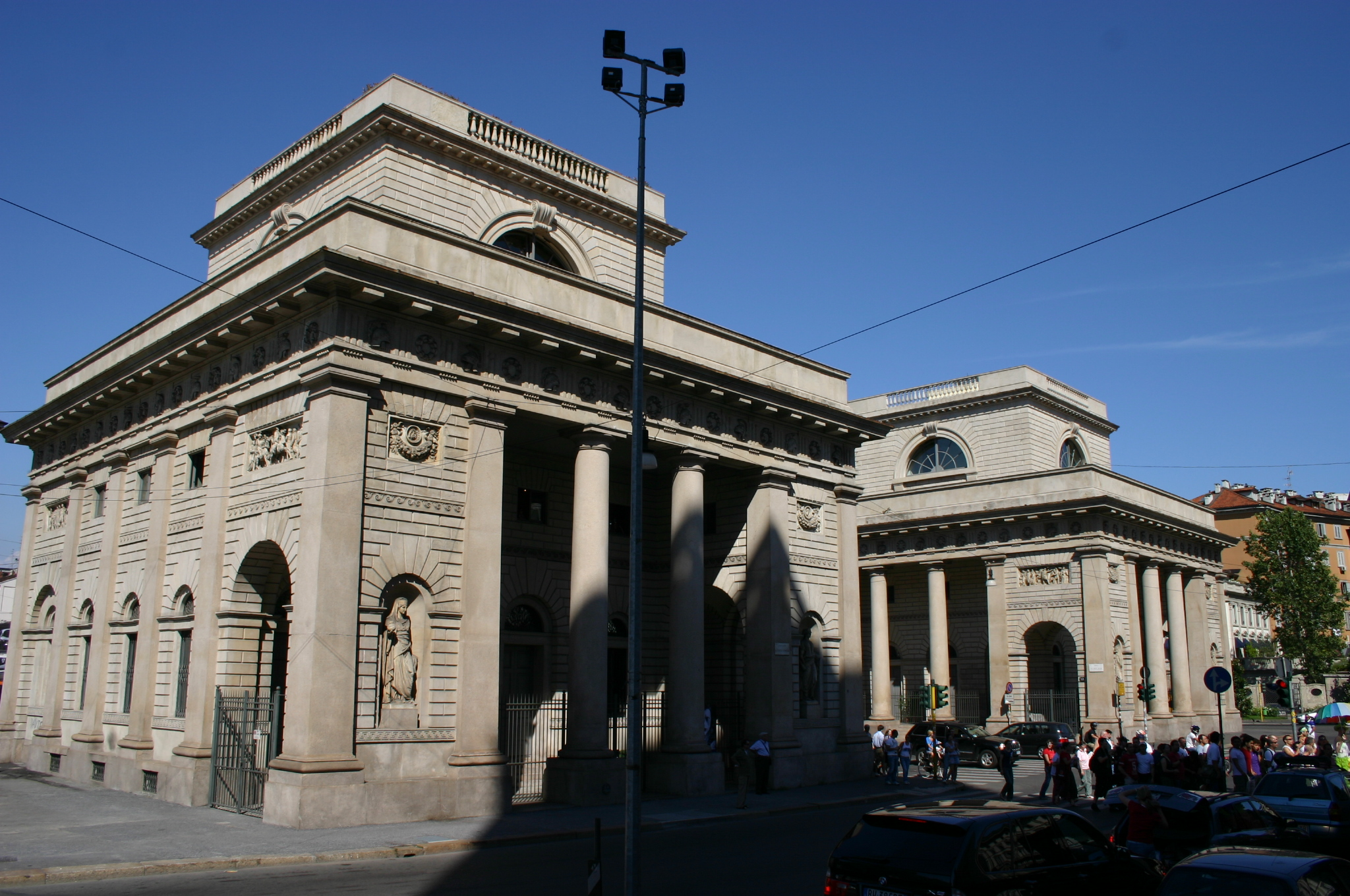
Vantini's Porta Orientale customs offices in Milan (1828)

Rodolfo Vantini (1792 – 1856) was an Italian architect. He is remembered for his Neoclassical contributions to architecture in his native city of Brescia and in the surrounding regions of northern Italy. His masterpiece is the design of Milan's Porta Orientale customs offices.

== Career ==
Vantini, who taught drawing at the Brescia high school, contributed to the development of Neoclassical architecture in Brescia. His works there include the Porta Pila (demolished in 1856) and the new cemetery, or Cimitero Vantiniano, Italy's first monumental cemetery designed in 1815. The Arco del Granarolo (Granarolo Arch), completed in 1822, is surmounted by a marble balustrade and stands on two marble pilasters. In 1825, he completed the raised dome of the Duomo Nuovo designed by Luigi Cagnola. He also worked on the restoration or completion of the city's main churches including San Francesco, San Clemente, Santa Maria dei Miracoli and San Nazaro.

Vantini's major achievement was designing the majestic Neoclassical customs offices at the Porta Orientale in Milan, completed in 1828.

== See also ==
- Neoclassical architecture in Milan

== Bibliography ==
- G.L. Ciagà, Gli archivi di architettura in Lombardia. Censimento delle fonti, 2003, Centro di Alti Studi sulle Arti Visive, Soprintendenza archivistica della Lombardia e del Politecnico di Milano. (in Italian)
- Anna Braghini, Note sui disegni di Rodolfo Vantini, in "Il disegno di architettura", n° 1, 1990, pp. 27–30 (in Italian)
- Anna Braghini, Per un catalogo dei disegni di Rodolfo Vantini, in "Commentari dell'Ateneo di Brescia per l'anno 1989", Fratelli Geroldi, Brescia, 1990, pp. 473–488 (in Italian)
- Carlo Minelli, Enrica Pinna, Rosy Toma, Il fondo Vantini all'Archivio di Stato di Brescia, in "Il disegno di architettura", n° 14, 1996, pp. 62–70. DEAU, 1968, VI, pp. 376–377 (in Italian)
- Leonardo Leo, Alida Salvi, Inventario del Fondo Vantini conservato presso l'Archivio di Stato di Brescia, in "Scritti in onore di Gaetano Panazza", Brescia, 1994, pp. 371–402 (in Italian)
- Lionello Costanza Fattori, Rodolfo Vantini architetto (1792-1856), Fondazione Ugo da Como, Lonato, 1963 (in Italian)
- Micaela Pisaroni, Il neoclassicismo - Itinerari di Milano e Provincia, 1999, Como, NodoLibri (in Italian)
- Rodolfo Vantini e l'architettura neoclassica a Brescia, atti del convegno, Ateneo di scienze, lettere ed arti, Brescia, 1995 (in Italian)
