= Klemens (surname) =

Klemens or Clemens (German for "Clement") is a German surname.

It may refer to:

- Anna Klemens (1718–1800), Danish murder victim
- Ben Klemens (born 1975), Australian economist
- Jozef Božetech Klemens (1817–1883), Slovak portrait painter, sculptor, photographer, inventor and naturalist
- Mario Klemens (1936–2025), Czech conductor and educator of conducting

== See also ==
- Saint Klemens (disambiguation)
- Clement (name)
