= San Clemente, Brescia =

Church in Brescia, Italy

Coordinates: 45.537751°N 10.22619°E

San Clemente
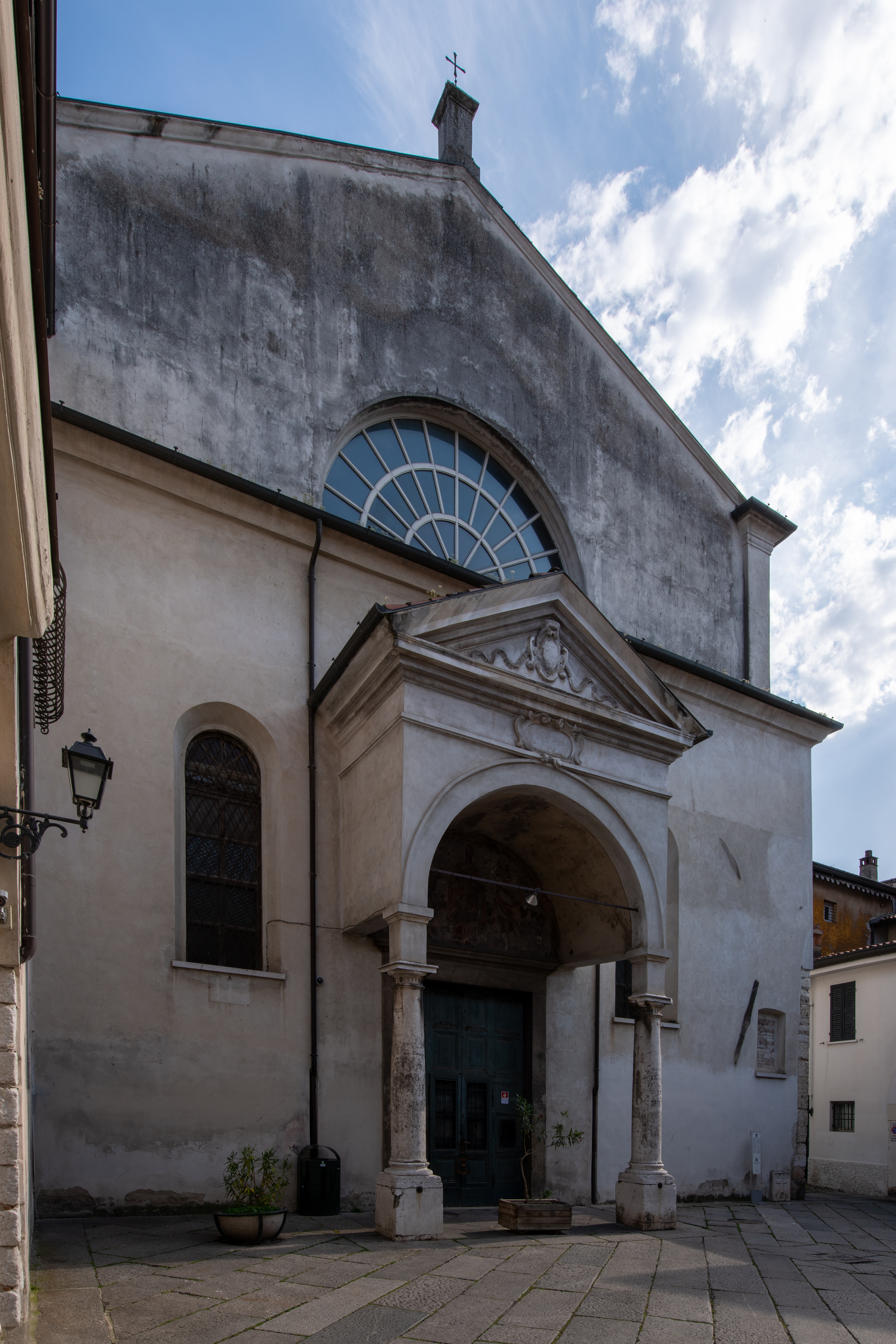

Religion
- Affiliation: Roman Catholic
- Province: Brescia

Location
- Location: Brescia, Italy
- Interactive map of San Clemente

Architecture
- Type: Neoclassic Facade
- Groundbreaking: Late 14th century

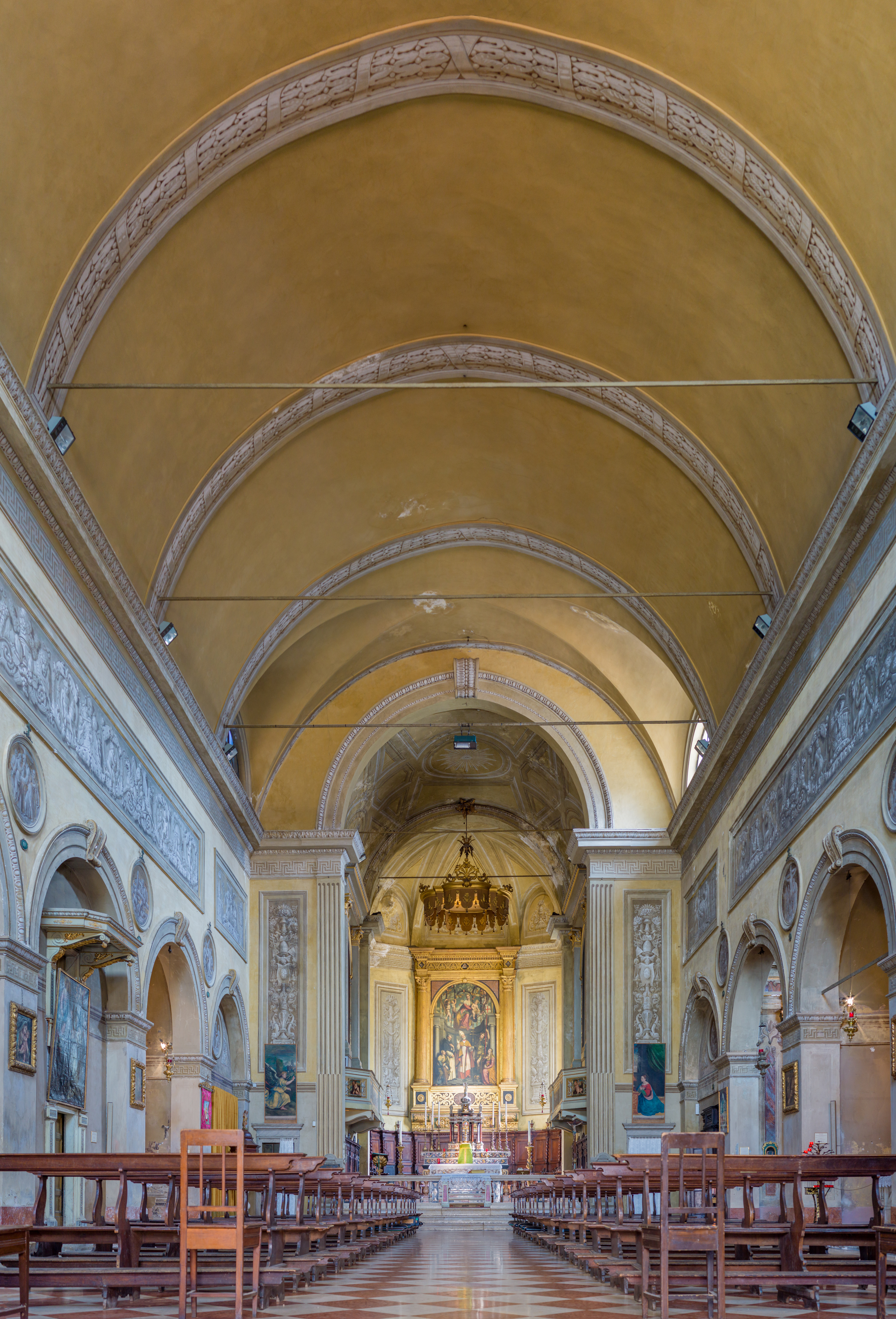
Interior view of the church.

The church of San Clemente is an ancient Roman Catholic church located near the Piazza del Foro, in central Brescia, region of Lombardy, Italy.

== History ==
A church at the site is documented by 954, and was initially attached to the adjacent Benedictine monastery. The church and convent were destroyed during a Venetian siege in 1517.

The present plan was completed by the late 15th century. Further reconstructions occurred, with the latest which gave the present façade in 1800 under the architect Rodolfo Vantini.

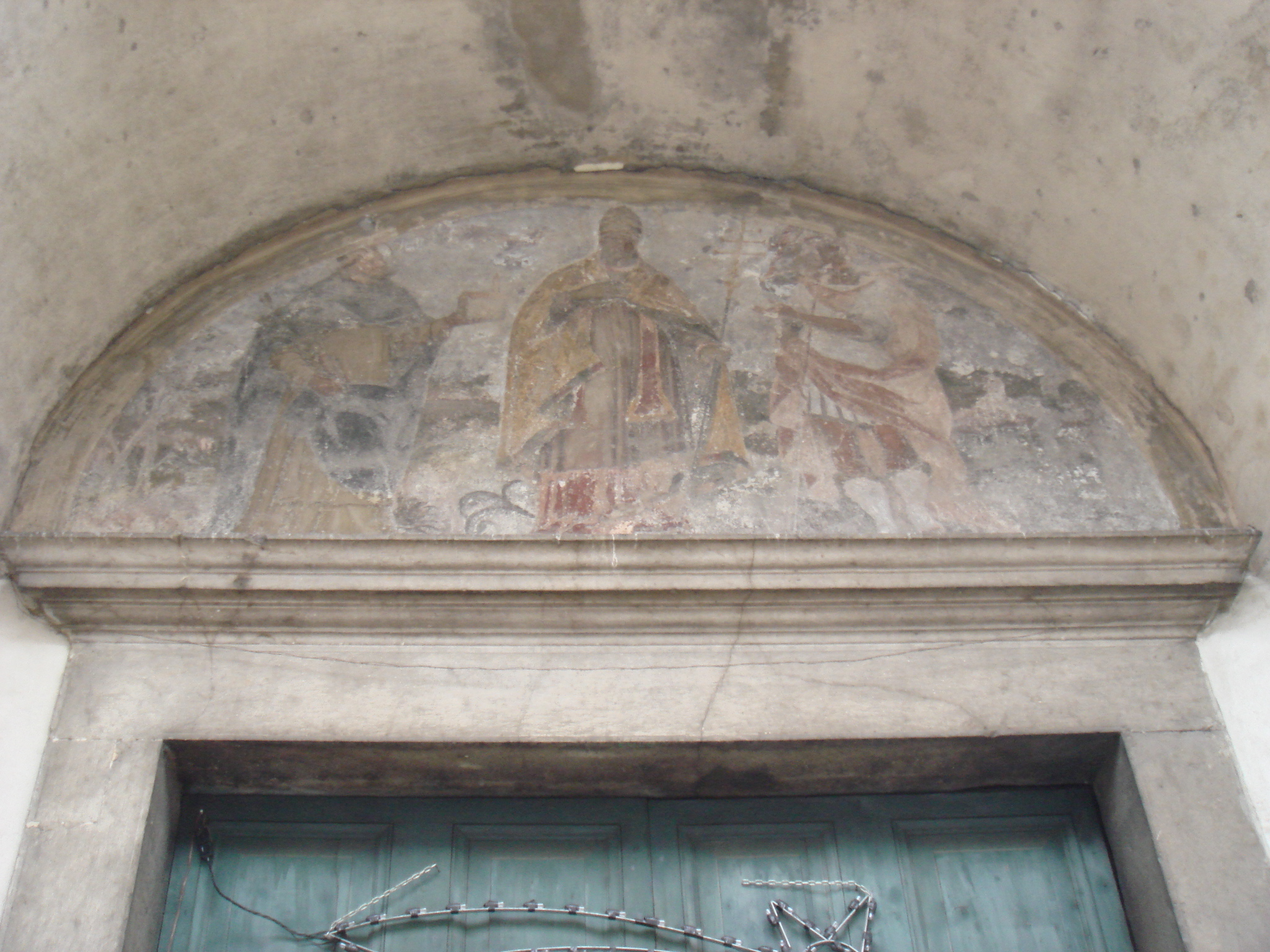
Detail of portal

== Description ==
The interior of the portico has a damaged fresco of Pope Clement I with Christ and saints. The main altar from 18th century was a work of Antonio Calegari. The choir is frescoed by Antonio Capello.

The church contains a number of masterpieces by Moretto, including:

- St Ursula and Thousand Virgins
- Mystical Wedding of St Catherine of Alexandria with Saints Catherine of Siena, Paul, and Jerome
- Offer of Melchisedech to Abraham
- a striking Assumption or Virgin in Glory with Saints Clement, Domenic, Florian, Catherina and Mary Magdalen
- Martyred Female Saints (Saints Cecilia, Lucia, Barbara, Agnese, and Agata).

The church also has a fresco of a Resurrection with St. Clement and Teresa painted by Il Romanino, a contemporary of Moretto.
