= Clement (name) =

- Gender: Male

Origin
- Language: Latin
- Meaning: merciful
- Region of origin: France, England

Other names
- Alternative spelling: Clément
- Derivative: Clem
- Related names: Clementine

Clement or Clément is a French and English given name and surname, a form of the Late Latin name Clemens. People with those given names or surnames include:

== Given name (chronological order) ==
- Pope Clement (disambiguation), any of at least 14 real Popes and two Antipopes, beginning with Pope Clement I (died 99 or 101), who is venerated as a Saint
- Clement of Alexandria (died c. 217), a Church father, venerated as a Saint
- Clement, bishop of Zaragoza ca. 326
- Clement of Metz (4th century), first bishop of Metz
- Aurelius Prudentius Clemens, Christian poet (348–c. 413)
- Clement of Ireland (born c. 750), venerated as a Saint, active in the Paris Schools
- Clement of Ohrid (died 916), venerated as a Saint
- Clement of Llanthony (12th century), prior of Llanthony Priory
- Clement of Dunblane (died 1258), bishop of Dunblane
- Clément Marot (died 1544), French poet
- Clement Cruttwell (1743–1808), English mapmaker
- Clement Clarke Moore (1779–1863), American poet and author of A Visit from St. Nicholas
- Clement Matthews (1889–1915), English footballer
- Clément Rodier (1829–1904), French missionary in Algeria & fruit breeder for whom the clementine was named
- Clement Studebaker (1831–1901), American wagon and carriage manufacturer
- Clement Higgins (1844–1916), British politician
- Clement Attlee (1883–1967), Prime Minister of UK (1945–1951)
- Clement Hambourg (1900–1973), Canadian pianist and jazz promoter
- Clement Greenberg (1909–1994), American art critic
- Clement Haynsworth (1912–1989), American judge
- Clement Chen Jr. (1924–1996), Chinese-born American architect and businessperson
- Clement Freud (1924–2009), politician, writer, comedian and grandson of Sigmund Freud
- Clement, nom de guerre of Eugène Chavant (1894–1969) in the French resistance during World War II
- Clement Howell (1935–1987), politician who disappeared at sea
- Clément Michu (1936–2016), French actor
- Clément N'Goran (born 1969), Ivorian tennis player
- Clement Chiwaya (1971–2021), Malawian politician
- Clement Cheng (21st century), Canadian-Hong Kong film director
- Clément Chantôme (born 1987), French footballer
- Clement Ivanov (born 1990), Estonian Dota 2 player
- Clément Petit (footballer) (born 1998), Belgian footballer
- Clement Victor Gunaratna (died 2000), Sri Lankan Sinhala government minister
- Clément Berthier (born 2000), French para table tennis player
- Clément Petit (cyclist) (born 2001), French cyclist

== Surname ==
- Adolphe Clément-Bayard (1855–1928), French industrialist
- Aeron Clement (1936–1989), Welsh science-fiction author
- Albéric Clément (1165–1191), First Marshal of France
- Albert Clément (1883–1907), racing driver, participant in the first French Grand Prix in 1906
- Alberto Vallarino Clement (born 1951), Panamanian engineer
- Amanda Clement (1888–1971), American baseball umpire
- Amy C. Clement, American climatologist
- Anthony Clement (born 1976), American football player
- Anthony Clement of Saxony (1755–1836), King of Saxony
- Arnaud Clément (born 1977), French tennis player
- Aurore Clément (born 1945), French actor
- Bill Clement (born 1950), Canadian ice hockey player and broadcaster
- Bill Clement (rugby union) (1915–2007), Welsh rugby international
- Bob Clement (born 1943), American politician
- Carleton Main Clement (1896–1917), Canadian flying ace
- Charles Clement (Wisconsin politician) (1815–1886), Wisconsin state senator
- Charles M. Clement (1855–1934), American major general and attorney
- Christophe Clement (1965–2025), French-born American Thoroughbred horse trainer
- Clay Clement (1888–1956), American actor
- Coralie Clément (born 1978), French singer
- Dave Clement (1948–1982), English footballer
- Dick Clement (born 1937), English writer and director
- Edith Brown Clement (born 1948), American circuit court judge
- Edmond Clément (1867–1928), French tenor
- Ernie Clement (born 1996), American baseball player
- François Clément (1714–1793), French historian
- Frank G. Clement (1920–1969), Tennessee governor
- Franz Clement (1780–1842), Austrian violinist and composer
- Georges Clément, French athlete in 1900 Olympics
- Gilles Clément (born 1943), French garden designer, writer, botanist
- Gregory Clement (1594–1660), English parliamentarian
- Hal Clement (1922–2003), American writer
- Hudson Clement, American football player
- Jack Clement (1931–2013), American singer, songwriter, record and film producer
- Jacques Clément (1567–1589), assassin of king
- James Clement (born 1976), Australian rules football player
- Jean-Baptiste Clément (1836–1903), French author
- Jean-Pierre Clément (1809–1870), a French political economist and historian
- Jeff Clement (born 1983), American baseball player
- Jemaine Clement (born 1974), New Zealand actor, comedian
- Jennifer Clement (born 1960), Mexican-American writer
- Jérémy Clément (born 1984), French footballer
- Joseph Clement (1779–1844), British industrialist
- Josephine Dobbs Clement (1918–1998), American politician and civil rights activist
- Kerron Clement (born 1985), American athlete
- Lidia Klement (1937–1964), Soviet singer
- Lillian Exum Clement (1894–1925), North Carolina politician
- Linda Clement (born 1980), Scottish field hockey player
- Martin W. Clement (1881–1966), American railroad business manager
- Matt Clement (born 1974), American baseball player
- Matt Clement (born 1988), Canadian professional wrestler better known as Tyler Breeze
- Michael Clement, American accountant
- Nathan Clement (born 1994), Canadian para-cyclist and para-swimmer
- Neil Clement (born 1978), English footballer
- Nicolas Clément (1779–1841), French chemist
- Niyigena Clement (born 2001), Rwandan footballer
- Olivier Clement (1921–2009), French Eastern Orthodox theologian
- Pascal Clément (1945–2020), French jurist and politician
- Paul Clement (born 1966), American Solicitor-General (2004–2008)
- Paul Clement (football coach) (born 1972), English football coach
- Philippe Clement (born 1974), Belgian football manager and former player
- René Clément (1913–1996), French film director
- Richard Clement (1832–1873), English cricketer and Treasury clerk
- Reynold Clement (1834–1905), English cricketer and military officer, and his son the soldier Sydney Reynold Clement (1873–1915)
- Richard Clement (1754–1829), Barbados landowner
- Rod Clement (1919–1969), Canadian politician
- Roland Clement (1912–2015), American conservationist
- Samuel Clement (1788–1833), American plantation owner and state legislator
- Skipper Clement (1484–1536), Danish merchant, captain, privateer
- Stef Clement (born 1982), Dutch cyclist
- Stephen Emmett Clement (1867–1947), Canadian politician
- Tony Clement (born 1961), Canadian parliamentarian
- Travers Clement, executive secretary of the Socialist Party of America
- William Clement (academic) (1707–1782), Irish academic
- William T. Clement (1894–1955), American soldier
- Wolfgang Clement (1940–2020), German politician

== See also ==
- Clemens, a given name and surname
- Kliment, a given name
- Clement (disambiguation)
- Clementine (disambiguation)
- Clementine (given name)
- Saint Clement (disambiguation)
- Clements
