= Klement =

Klement is a given name and surname. People with that name include:

== Given name ==
- Klement Gottwald (1896–1953), Czechoslovak politician
- Klement Slavický (1910–1999), Czech composer
- Klement Steinmetz (1915–2001), Austrian football player

== Surname ==
- Lidia Klement (1937–1964), Soviet singer
- Martina Klement (born 1980), German politician
- Philipp Klement (born 1992), German footballer
- Uta Klement (born 1962), German materials scientist and academic
- Václav Klement (1868–1938), Czech automotive pioneer
- Vera Klement (born 1929), American artist

== See also ==
- Clement (disambiguation)
