= Clement =

Clement or Clément may refer to:

== People ==
- Clement (name), a given name and surname
- Saint Clement (disambiguation)#People

== Places ==
- Clément, French Guiana, a town
- Clement, Missouri, U.S.
- Clement Township, Michigan, U.S.
- Clement's Place, jazz club in Newark, New Jersey

== Other uses ==
- Adolphe Clément-Bayard French industrialist (1855–1928), founder of a number of companies which incorporate the name "Clément", including:
  - Clément Cycles, French bicycle and motorised cycle manufacturer
  - Clément Motor Company, British automobile manufacturer and importer
  - Clément Tyres, Franco-Italian cycle tyre manufacturer, licensed in America since 2010
- First Epistle of Clement, of the New Testament apocrypha
- Clément (film), a 2001 French drama

== See also ==
- Clemens, a name
- Clemente, a name
- Clements (disambiguation)
- Clementine (disambiguation)
- Klement, a name
- Kliment, a name
- San Clemente (disambiguation)
