= Aeron =

Aeron is used in several ways including:

== People ==
Given name

- Aeron Clement (1936–1989), American science fiction author

Fictional characters

- Aeron Azzameen, only daughter of the Azzameen family from the video game, Star Wars: X-Wing Alliance
- Aeron Greyjoy, character from the novel series, A Song of Ice and Fire
- Aeron, the main protagonist of the action role-playing video game Pandora's Tower

== Places ==
- Aeron (kingdom), early Brythonic kingdom in northern Britain
- Ciliau Aeron, small village near Aberaeron in Ceredigion, Wales
- Nova Aeron, an Austrian paraglider design
- River Aeron, small river that flows into Cardigan Bay
- Ystrad Aeron, small village between Lampeter and Aberaeron, Wales

== Other uses ==
- Aeron (Celtic mythology), a.k.a. Agronā, Welsh river, possibly named for an ancient female spirit or goddess of battle and slaughter
- Aeron chair, product of Herman Miller designed in 1994
- Aeron Express, hand powered cable ferry in the Welsh coastal town of Aberaeron
- Alejandra and Aeron, artists based in Oslo, Norway
