= L'Africaine =

1865 French opera

L'Africaine (Vasco de Gama)
- Grand opéra by Giacomo Meyerbeer
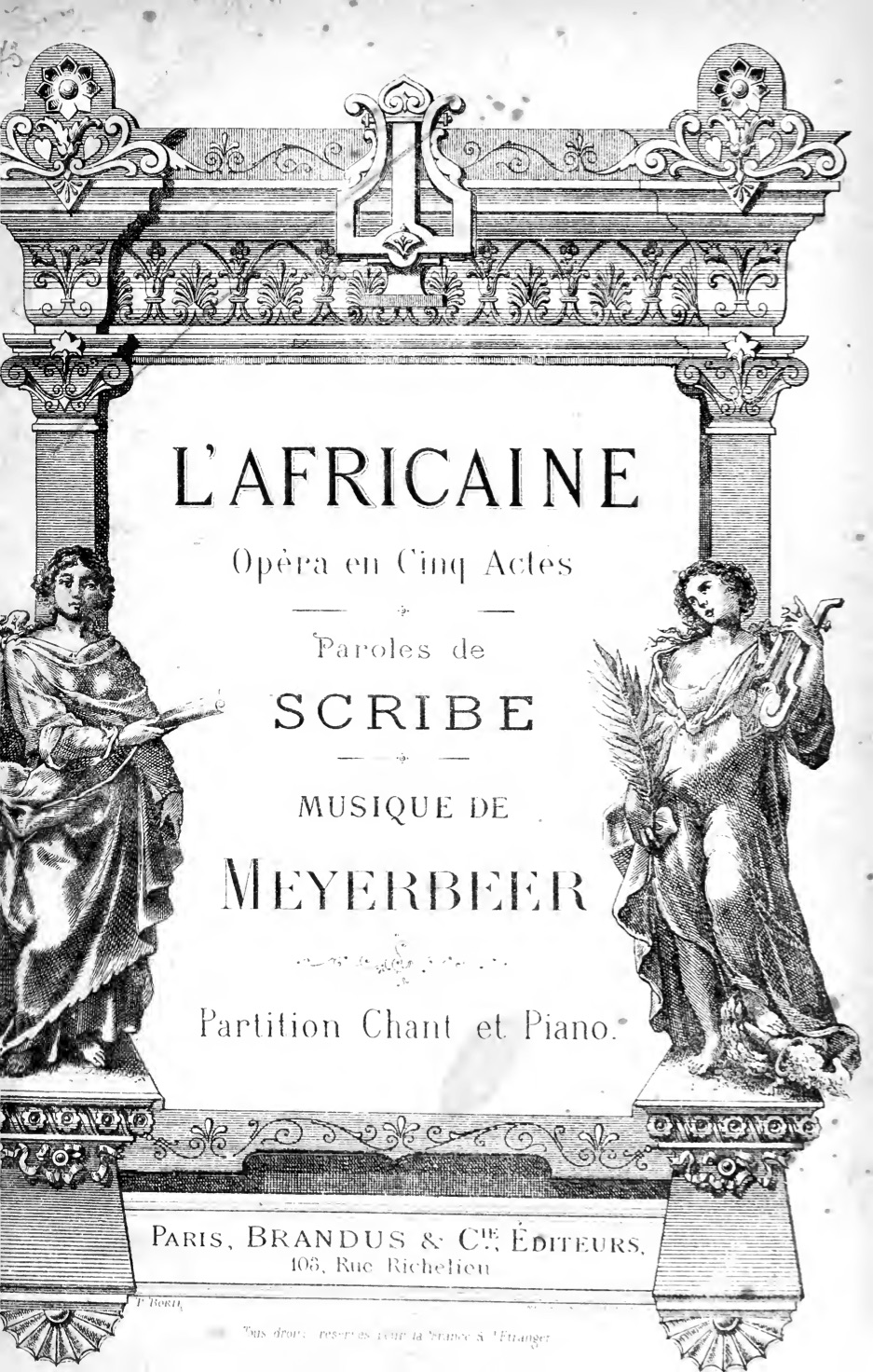
- Cover of the 1865 piano-vocal score
- Librettist: Eugène Scribe
- Language: French
- Premiere: 28 April 1865; Paris Opéra

L'Africaine (The African Woman) is an 1865 French grand opéra in five acts with music by Giacomo Meyerbeer and a libretto by Eugène Scribe. Meyerbeer and Scribe began working on the opera in 1837, using the title L'Africaine, but around 1852 changed the plot to portray fictitious events in the life of the Portuguese explorer Vasco da Gama and introduced the working title Vasco de Gama, the French version of his name. The copying of the full score was completed the day before Meyerbeer died in 1864.

The opera was premiered the following year by the Paris Opéra in a version made by François-Joseph Fétis, who restored the earlier title, L'Africaine. The Fétis version was published and was used for subsequent performances until 2013, when some productions and recordings began using Meyerbeer's preferred title, Vasco de Gama, for performing versions with revisions based on the manuscript score. In 2018 the music publisher Ricordi issued a critical edition of Meyerbeer's manuscript full score under that title.

== Composition ==
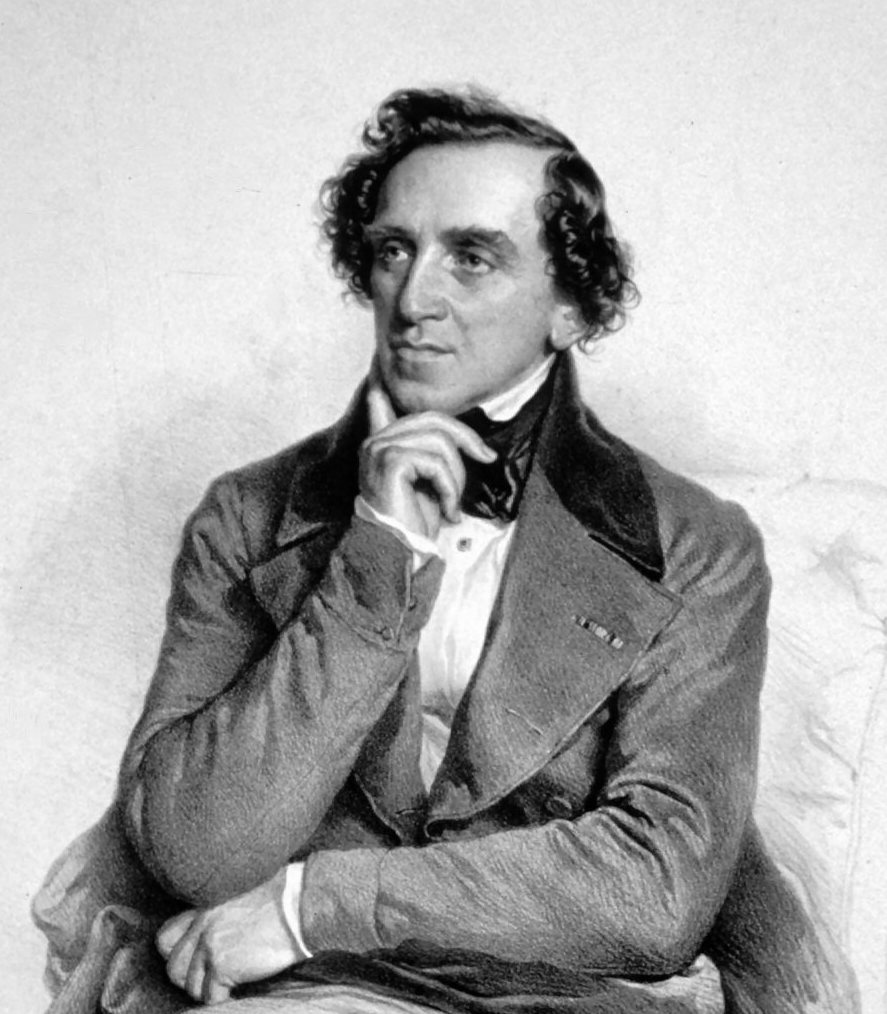
Giacomo Meyerbeer, portrayed in 1847

The first contract between Meyerbeer and Scribe for the writing of the libretto was signed in May 1837. The starting point for the story was "Le Mancenillier", a poem by Charles Hubert Millevoye, in which a girl sits under a tree releasing poisonous vapors but is saved by her lover. The plot is also based on an unidentified German tale and a 1770 play by Antoine Lemierre, La Veuve de Malabar, in which a Hindu maiden loves a Portuguese navigator, a theme already treated by the composer Louis Spohr in his opera Jessonda.

Cornélie Falcon was originally intended for the principal soprano role of Sélika, but suffered an illness that ended her career. The loss of Falcon and reservations about the libretto caused Meyerbeer to set the project aside in the summer of 1838, when he shifted his focus to the preparation of Le Prophète.

Meyerbeer resumed work on L'Africaine (the original working title) in 1841 and completed the first draft and a piano score of the first two acts in 1843, after which he again set the project aside. The original story was set in Spain during the reign of Philip III. The protagonist was a naval officer by the name of Fernand (based on Ferdinand de Soto), who buys Sélika as a slave. While sailing for Mexico in Act 3, his ships are forced to seek shelter on the coast of Sélika's kingdom in Africa on the Niger River.

In 1851–1852, Meyerbeer and Scribe continued working on the libretto. Meyerbeer had read a French translation of Camoens's The Lusiads, an epic poem that celebrates the discovery of a sea route to India by Vasco da Gama. Meyerbeer and Scribe changed the setting of Acts 1 and 2 to Lisbon and of Acts 4 and 5 to India. The protagonist became Vasco da Gama, and the working title was changed from L'Africaine to Vasco de Gama.

Meyerbeer's work on L'Étoile du nord and Le Pardon de Ploërmel caused further delay, but Meyerbeer returned to the libretto in September 1855. He had intended the role of Sélika for the soprano Sophie Cruvelli, but Cruvelli's abrupt retirement from the public stage in January 1856 interrupted his plans. He began composing music for the Council Scene of Act 1 in Nice (December 1857 – April 1858). He worked on the opera almost continuously from March 1860 until a few days before his death. Scribe died on 20 February 1861, after which Charlotte Birch-Pfeiffer provided German revisions that were translated into French by Joseph Duesberg. Meyerbeer himself revised Sélika's death scene in November and December 1863. He died on 2 May 1864, one day after the completion of the copying of the full score.

Since substantial revisions and excisions almost always occur during rehearsals, Meyerbeer requested the opera should not be given, if he died before it was produced. However, Minna Meyerbeer (his widow) and César-Victor Perrin (the director of the Opéra) appointed François-Joseph Fétis to edit the music for a performing version, and Mélesville to edit the libretto. Because the title L'Africaine was already well known to the general public, it was reinstated, and, to achieve consistency of this title with the Hindu references in the libretto, India was changed to Madagascar. The opera was greatly shortened, damaging some of the logic of the story.

It was during the revisions by Fétis and his collaborators, including, besides Mélesville, Camille Du Locle, Germain Delavigne, and Marie-Joseph-François Mahérault, that the name of the character Yoriko was changed to Nélusko, the name of the high priest of Brahma (Zanguebar) was removed, and the spelling of Sélica was changed to Sélika. For the required ballet, which Meyerbeer had not provided, Fétis arranged two cut numbers (Sélika's Lullaby in Act 2 and the sailors' Ronde bachique of Act 3). He also moved a duet for Sélika and Nélusko from the Act 3 finale to Act 5.

The music historian Robert Letellier has written that Fétis "on the whole reached an acceptable compromise between the presumed artistic wishes of Meyerbeer and the practical necessities of performance", but "retaining the historical figure of Vasco, as well as the Hindu religion depicted in Act 4, led to almost irreparable absurdity in the action because of the change in locations given for Acts 4 and 5 on the printed libretto in the vocal score (an island on the east coast of Africa) and in the full score (an island in the Indian archipelago)." Gabriela Cruz has published detailed analyses of the compositional history, dramaturgy, material history and reception of the opera.

Tim Ashley of The Guardian wrote:

Fétis's alterations consisted largely of cuts and re-orderings, the aim of which, ostensibly, was to bring the opera within manageable length, and to improve narrative clarity, though the plot, by operatic standards, isn't that difficult. ... But Fétis's changes tone down Meyerbeer's clear-minded examination of the complex relationship between colonial and sexual exploitation. He makes Sélika acquiescent by shortening or removing scenes in which she is assertive. And he prettifies her suicide, which Meyerbeer intended as troubling. We don't know what changes Meyerbeer was planning: one hopes he would have sorted out the longueurs in the first two acts. But there's no doubt that Fétis did him a grave disservice.

== Performance history ==
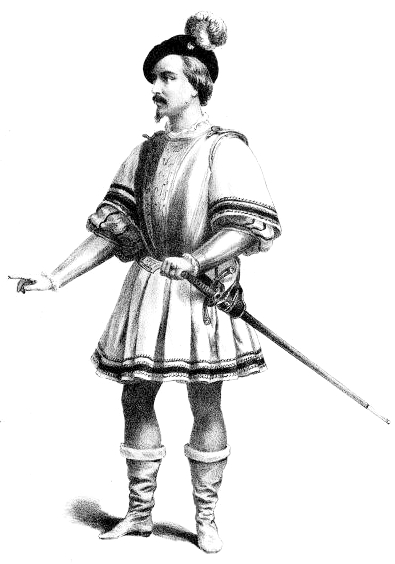
Victor Warot as Don Alvaro

The opera was premiered on 28 April 1865 by the Opéra at the Salle Le Peletier in Paris under the title L'Africaine in the performing edition undertaken by Fétis. Because of the long-running and unprecedented advance publicity, including countless reports in the domestic and international press, the production was a social and artistic sensation. The first night, attended by Emperor Napoleon III and Empress Eugénie, "provided Second Empire society with its most exalted self-presentation in terms of an opera premiere." Hourly reports on the progress of the event and its reception were relayed by telegraph to other European capitals. A bust of the composer, newly executed by Jean-Pierre Dantan, was revealed on the stage at the conclusion of the performance, and with only a few exceptions critics declared the production brilliant and the opera Meyerbeer's masterpiece.

L'Africaine was nearly the only work presented by the Opéra until 1 November 1865. In its first year it brought in 11,000 to 12,000 francs per performance (roughly twice what was earned by other programs) and reached its 100th presentation at the Salle Le Peletier on 9 March 1866. It was given there 225 times before its first performance in a new production at the new Paris opera house, the Palais Garnier, on 17 December 1877, and reached 484 representations before it was dropped from the repertoire on 8 November 1902.

The work had its British premiere at Covent Garden Theatre, London, on 22 July 1865, and in New York on 1 December 1865. It also received its Italian premiere in 1865 in Bologna, conducted by Angelo Mariani, and was staged four times at La Fenice between 1868 and 1892. It was also performed in Melbourne, Australia, in July 1866.

The opera elicited a mixed response in Portugal, the homeland of Vasco da Gama. A descendant of da Gama, the Marquês de Niza, was displeased with the depiction of his ancestor in the opera and succeeded in having the name of Vasco da Gama changed to Guido d'Arezzo (an 11th-century monk and music theorist) in the Lisbon performance. Additionally, the work became a catalyst for local debates on operatic historicism and the nature of the Portuguese imperial project.

The opera was enormously successful in the 19th century, but along with Meyerbeer's other operas, it fell into almost complete neglect in the 20th century, except for very occasional revivals. Plácido Domingo has sung it in at least two productions: a revival at the War Memorial Opera House in San Francisco that premiered on 13 November 1973, with Shirley Verrett; and in 1977 at the Liceu in Barcelona, with Montserrat Caballé. In the 21st century, Meyerbeer's major French grand operas are again appearing in new productions in European opera houses. To mark the 150th anniversary of Meyerbeer's death, the work was performed again at La Fenice in November 2013.

In 2013, a preliminary edition by Jürgen Schläder was staged by Chemnitz Opera under the title Vasco de Gama. The production was a success with audiences and critics and won the poll of German critics award presented by Opernwelt magazine annually as "Rediscovery of the year" in 2013. This edition was also used for a production at the Deutsche Oper in October 2015, with Roberto Alagna as Vasco de Gama and Sophie Koch as Sélika. A new production of L'Africaine/Vasco de Gama was staged at the Frankfurt Opera in 2018 with Michael Spyres as Vasco de Gama and Claudia Mahnke as Selika.

== Critical edition of Meyerbeer's autograph score ==
In December 2018, a critical edition of Meyerbeer's autograph score, edited by Jürgen Selk, was released as part of the Giacomo Meyerbeer Werkausgabe, by Ricordi, Berlin. This edition makes available, for the first time, a musical score derived directly from Meyerbeer's surviving autograph and employs the title Meyerbeer and Scribe had assigned to the work, Vasco de Gama. It also restores much of the original material that Fétis and his collaborators had altered in preparation both for the first performance and for the first publication of the work by G. Brandus & S. Dufour (1865). Among these revisions were musical alterations, cuts, tempo indications, and much of the lyrical text. Another change undertaken by Fétis and his collaborators was to change the names of “Sélica” to “Sélika” and “Yoriko” to “Nélusko.” Additionally, the High Priest of Brahma was referred to only under that title (“Le grand prêtre de Brahma”) and not as “Zanguebar.” Meyerbeer, however, used “Sélica,” “Yoriko, ” and “Zanguebar” exclusively throughout his score. The edition restores these character names to the way Meyerbeer wrote them.

== Roles ==
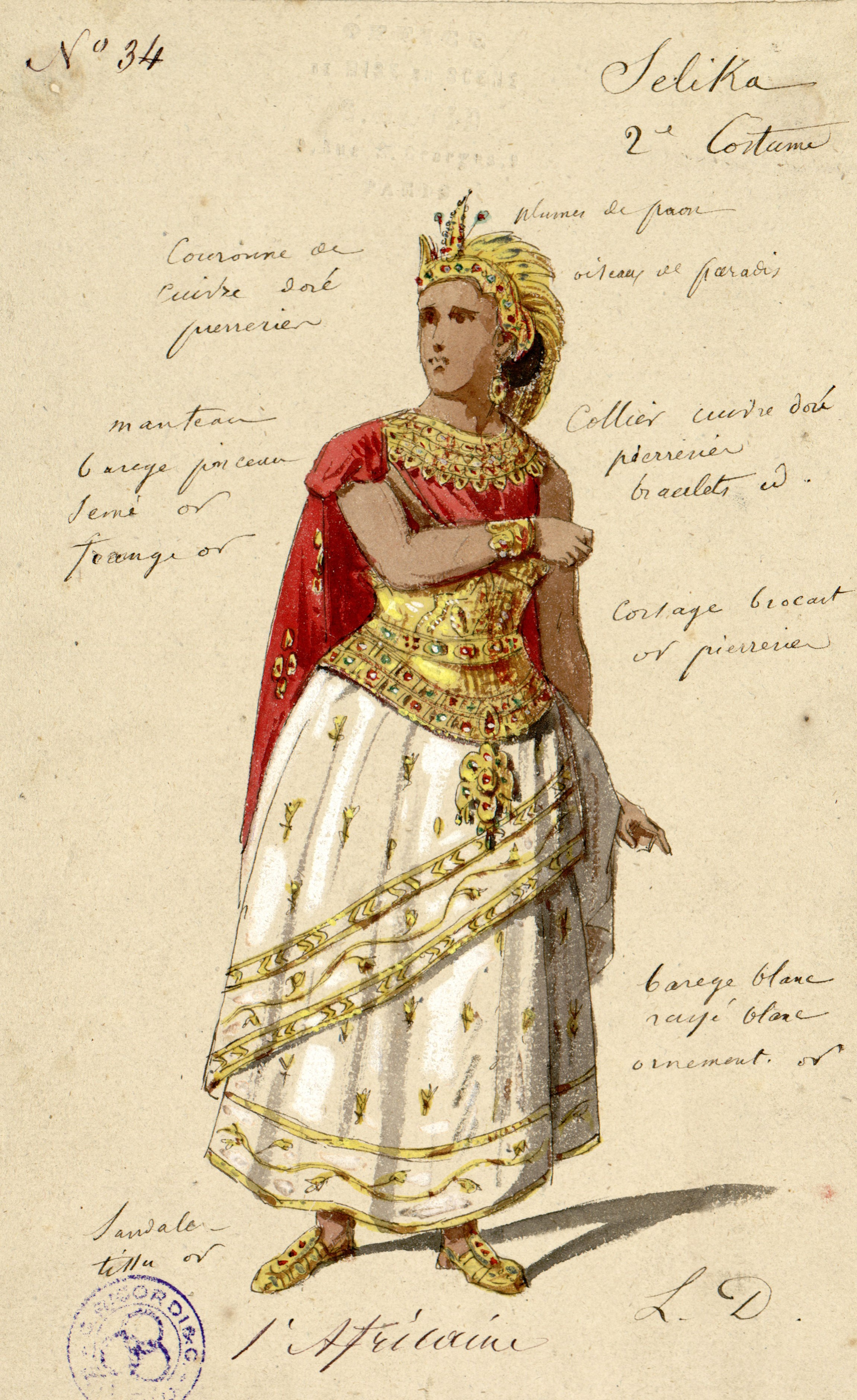
Costume design for Sélika (Ricordi, undated)

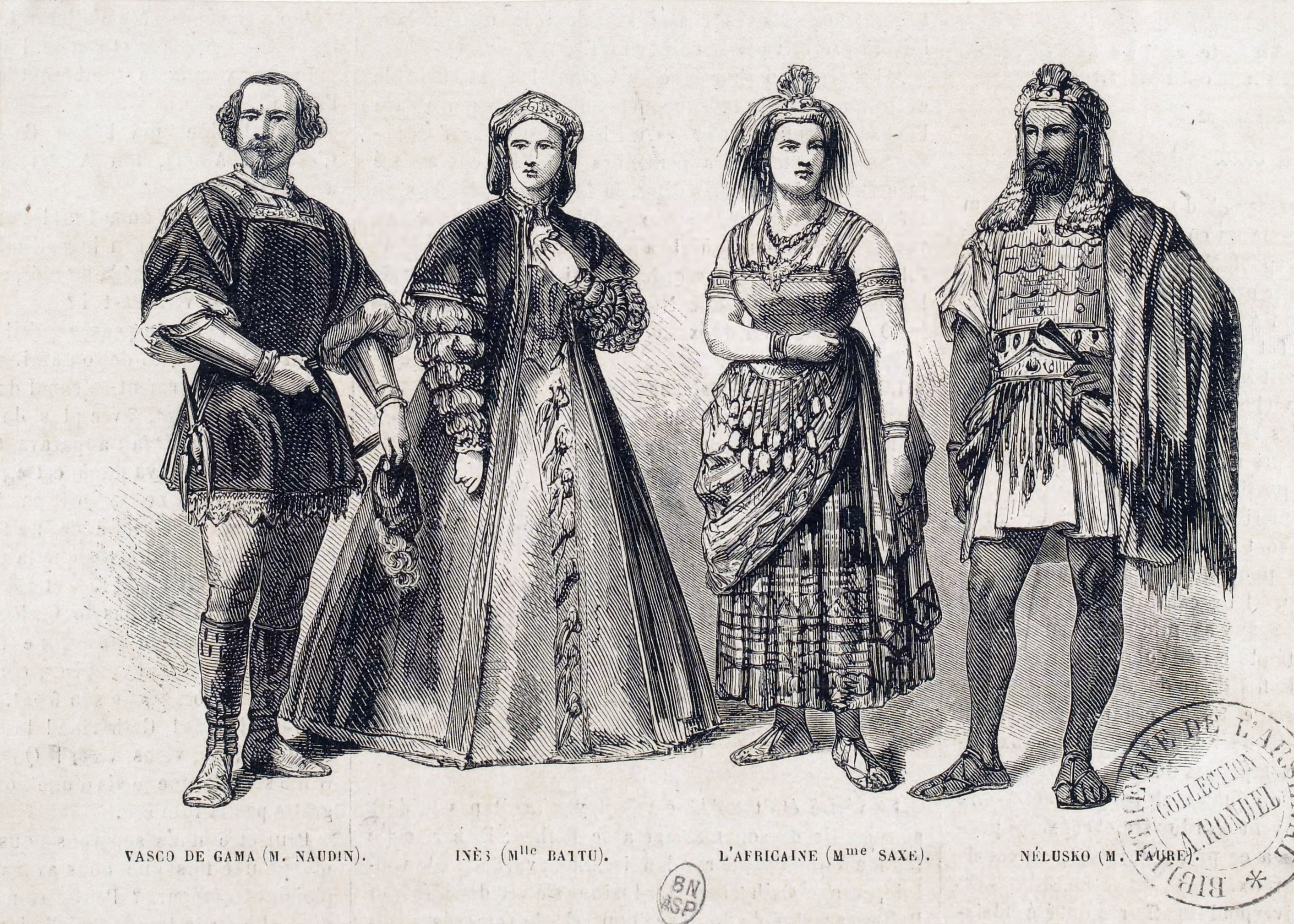
The four principal singers at the premiere, from left to right: Naudin, Battu, Sasse, Faure

Roles, voice types, and premiere cast
| Role | Voice type | Premiere cast, 28 April 1865 (Conductor: François George-Hainl) |
|---|---|---|
| Sélica (Sélika) | soprano | Marie Sasse |
| Vasco de Gama, a naval officer | tenor | Emilio Naudin |
| Inès, daughter of Don Diégo | soprano | Marie Battu |
| Yoriko (Nélusko), a slave | baritone | Jean-Baptiste Faure |
| Don Pédro, president of the Royal Council | bass | Belval (Jules-Bernard Gaffiot) |
| Don Diégo, an admiral | bass | Armand Castelmary |
| Anna, confidante of Inès | contralto | Leonia Levielly |
| Don Alvar, a council member | tenor | Victor Warot |
| Le Grand Inquisiteur, of Lisbon | bass | Joseph David |
| Zanguebar, high priest of Brahma | bass | Louis-Henri Obin |
Councillors, naval officers, bishops, Brahmins, Indians, soldiers, sailors

== Synopsis ==
The opera depicts fictional events in the life of the explorer Vasco da Gama ('de Gama' in the French libretto).

Place: Lisbon, at sea, and in an exotic new land
Time: late 15th century

=== Act 1 ===
The council chamber, Lisbon

The beautiful Inès is forced by her father, the Grand Admiral Don Diégo, to marry Don Pédro instead of her true love, Vasco de Gama. De Gama, who is thought to have died in the expedition of Bartolomeu Dias, appears at the Grand Council saying he has discovered a new land, and displaying Sélika and Nélusko as examples of a newly discovered race. His request for an expedition is refused, causing de Gama to attack the Grand Inquisitor, who anathematises him. De Gama is then imprisoned.

=== Act 2 ===
The prison

Sélika, who is in fact queen of the undiscovered land, saves de Gama, whom she loves, from being murdered by Nélusko, a member of her entourage. Inès agrees to marry Don Pédro if de Gama is freed; de Gama, not realising that Inès has made this bargain, and noticing her envy of Sélika, gives her Sélika and Nélusko as slaves. Don Pédro announces he is to mount an expedition to the new lands that were de Gama's discovery. Nélusko offers his services as pilot.

=== Act 3 ===
On Don Pédro's ship

Nélusko is navigating the ship, but is secretly planning to destroy the Europeans. He sings a ballad of the legend of Adamastor, the destructive giant of the sea. Nélusko gives orders that will direct the ship into an oncoming storm. De Gama has followed Don Pédro in another ship, and begs him to change course to avoid destruction. Don Pédro refuses, and orders him to be chained. The storm breaks out. Nélusko leads the local people to kill all the Europeans on the ships and only de Gama is spared.

=== Act 4 ===
Sélika's island

Sélika is met with a grand celebration and swears to uphold the island's laws, which include the execution of all strangers. De Gama is captured by priests, who intend to sacrifice him. He is amazed by the wonders of the island, and sings the most famous aria of the opera "O Paradis!" (O Paradise!). Sélika saves him by saying that he is her husband, forcing Nélusko to swear this is true. De Gama resigns himself to this new life, but hearing the voice of Inès, who is being taken to her execution, he rushes to find her.

=== Act 5 ===
The island

The reunion of de Gama and Inès is interrupted by Sélika, who feels betrayed. When she realises the strength of the lovers' affection, she allows them to return to Europe, telling Nélusko to escort them to de Gama's boat. She then commits suicide by inhaling the perfume of the poisonous blossoms of the manchineel tree. Nélusko follows her into death.

== Designs for the premiere ==
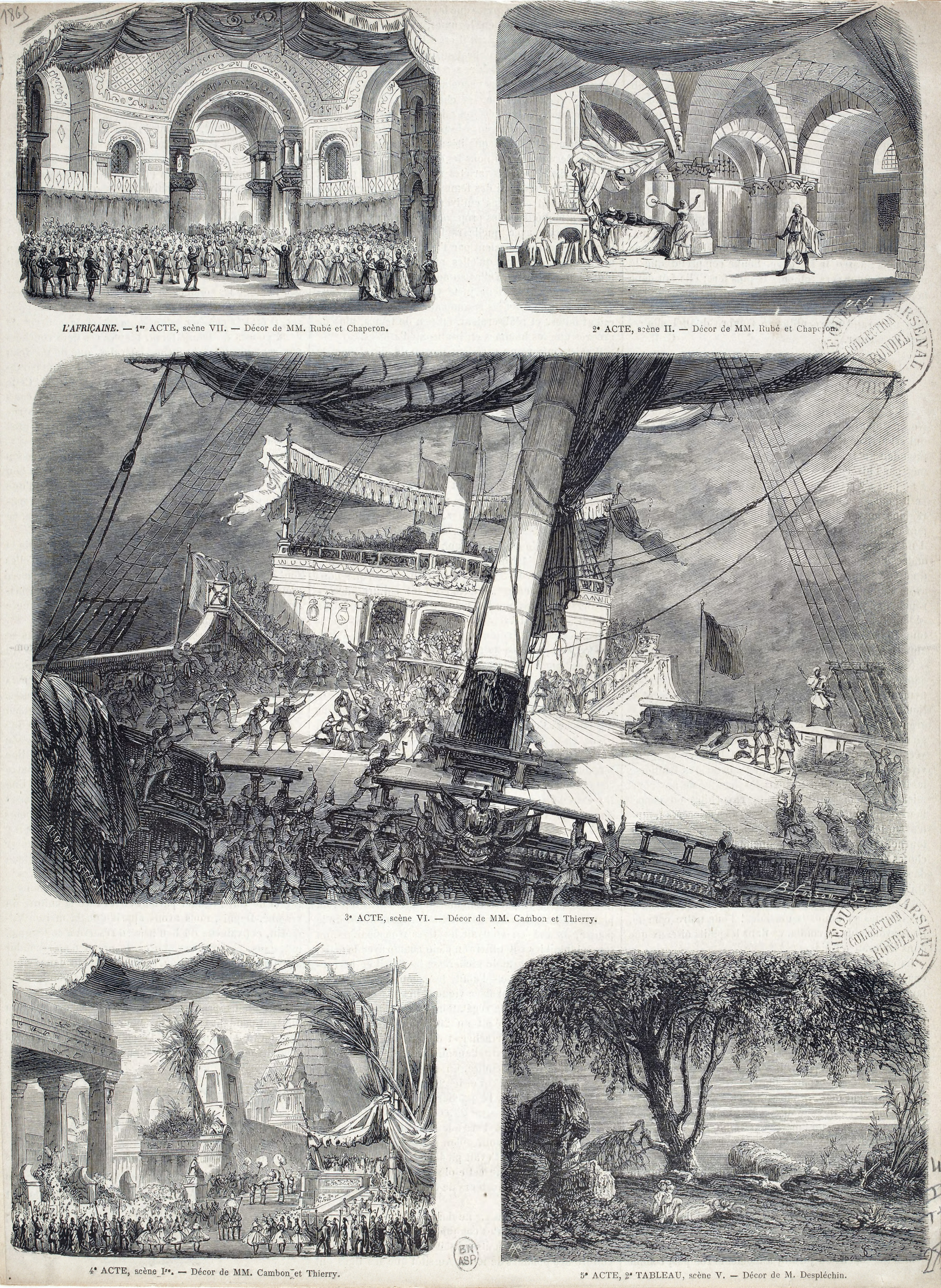
Set designs for the original production at the Salle Le Peletier

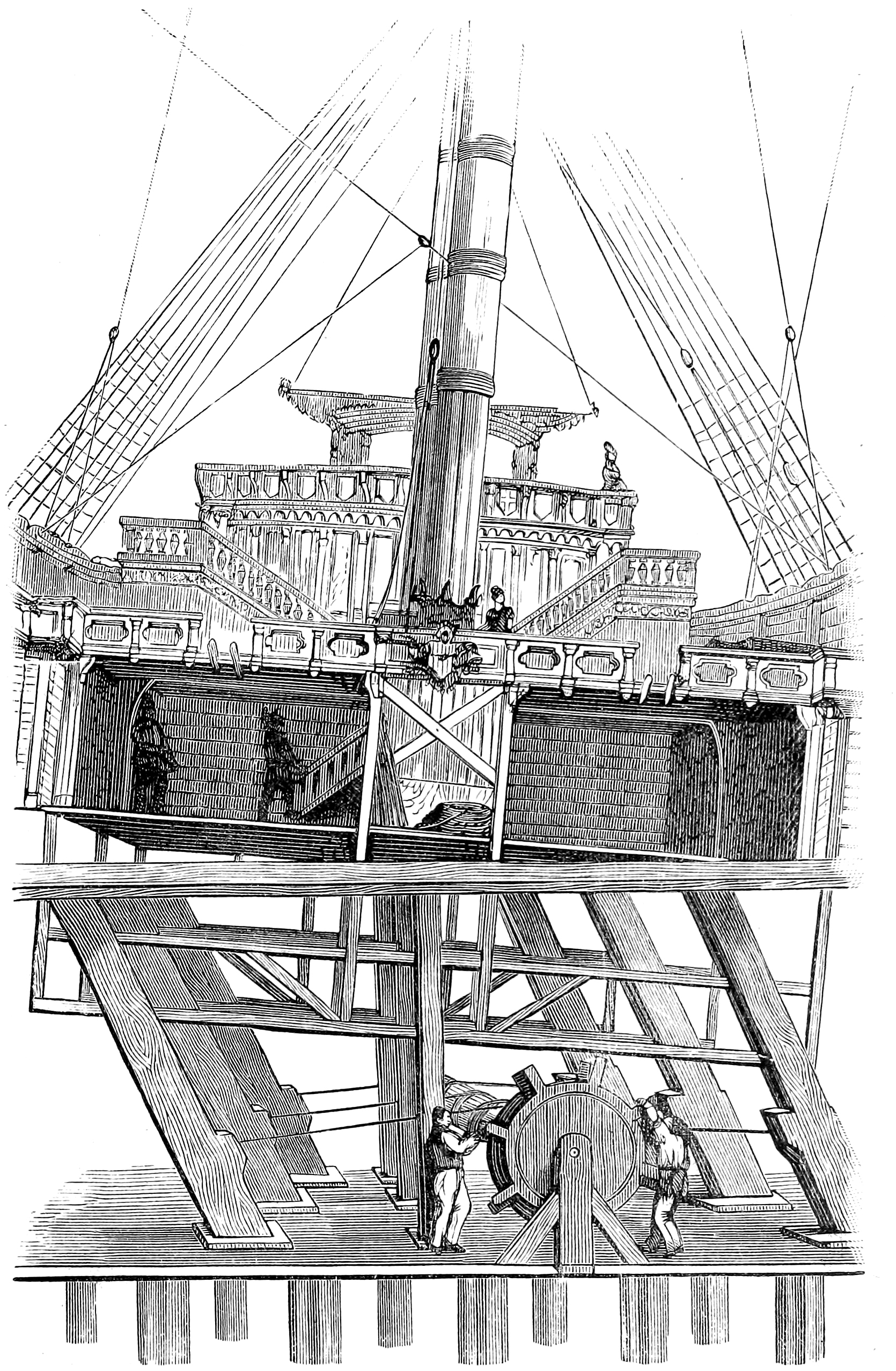
Working the ship in L'Africaine

The stage designs for the original production at the Paris Opera were created by Auguste Alfred Rubé and Philippe Chaperon for Act 1 (Council Scene) and Act 2 (Dungeon Scene); Charles-Antoine Cambon and Joseph Thierry for Act 3 (Sea Scene and Shipwreck) and Act 4 (Hindu Temple); Jean-Baptiste Lavastre for scene 1 of Act 5 (Queen's Garden, not shown); and Edouard Desplechin for scene 2 of Act 5 (The Manchineel Tree). The choreography was by Louis Mérante, and the costumes were designed by Paul Lormier and Alfred Albert. Engravings depicting the amazing sets appeared in periodicals throughout Europe. The final scene designed by Desplechin received special praise for its originality. Possibly because of advance publicity and high expectations, the Shipwreck Scene of act 3, executed by numerous stagehands, was deemed by the press to be somewhat disappointing. However, Arthur Pougin writing in 1885 identified the scene as the epitome of the company's grand opera mise en scène.

== Recordings ==
A well known highlight from the opera is the act 4 tenor aria "Pays merveilleux ... O, paradis", which has been recorded many times.

=== Recordings as L'Africaine ===
L'Africaine discography
| Year | Cast (Vasco de Gama, Inès, Sélika, Nélusko, Grand Inquisitor, High Priest) | Conductor, Opera house and orchestra | Label |
|---|---|---|---|
| 1971 | Veriano Lucchetti, Mietta Sighele, Jessye Norman, Giangiacomo Guelfi, Graziano del Vivo, Mario Rinaudo | Riccardo Muti, Orchestra and Chorus of the Maggio Musicale Fiorentino, (Recording of a performance at the Maggio Musicale, 30 April) | CD: Opera d'Oro, Cat: OPD 1467 |
| 1988 | Plácido Domingo, Ruth Ann Swenson, Shirley Verrett, Justino Díaz, Joseph Rouleau, Mark Delavan, Kevin Anderson | Maurizio Arena, San Francisco Opera Chorus and Orchestra | DVD: ArtHaus Musik; Cat: 100 217 |

=== Recording as Vasco de Gama (based on Meyerbeer's unedited version) ===
L'Africaine discography recorded as Vasco de Gama (based on Meyerbeer's unedited version
| Year, | Cast (Vasco de Gama, Inès, Sélika, Nélusko, Grand Inquisitor, Don Diego, Don Alvar) | Conductor, Opera house and orchestra | Label |
|---|---|---|---|
| 2014 | Bernhard Berchthold, Guibee Yang, Claudia Sorokina, Nikolay Borchev, Kouta Räsänen, Martin Gäbler, André Riemer | Frank Beermann, Chemnitz Opera, Robert Schumann Philharmonie | CD:CPO; Cat:7778282 |

Lynn René Bayley, writing in Fanfare commented on this recording: "I was so angered by this performance I could almost spit nails, because neither the conductor nor the cast understand Meyerbeer style in the slightest. [...]As for the missing music, some of it is quite good and some of goes in one ear and out the other."
