= Clement Matthews =

English footballer (1889–1915)

Personal information
- Full name: Clement Henry Matthews
- Date of birth: 1889
- Place of birth: Falmer, England
- Date of death: 15 August 1915 (aged 26)
- Place of death: Suvla Bay, Turkey

Senior career*
Years	Team	Apps	(Gls)
1911–1912	Horsham	17	(0)
1911–1914	Brighton & Hove Albion	12	(1)
- * Club domestic league appearances and goals

Clement Henry Matthews (1889 – 15 August 1915) was an English professional footballer who played in the Southern Football League for Brighton & Hove Albion.

== Personal life ==
Matthews worked as a bricklayer in Horsham. He served as a private in the Royal Sussex Regiment during the First World War and was shot and killed by a sniper at Suvla Bay, Gallipoli on 15 August 1915. He is buried at Green Hill Commonwealth War Graves Commission Cemetery.
