= Clements =

Clements may refer to:

== People ==
- Clements (surname)

== Places ==
- Clements, California, U.S.
- Clements, Kansas, U.S.
- Clements, Maryland, U.S.
- Clements, Minnesota, U.S.
- Clements, West Virginia, U.S.
- Port Clements, British Columbia, Canada

== Zoology ==
- The Clements Checklist of Birds of the World

== See also ==
- Clement (disambiguation)
- St Clements (disambiguation)
- Clements High School
- Clemence, a name
