= Emilio Naudin =

Italian opera singer

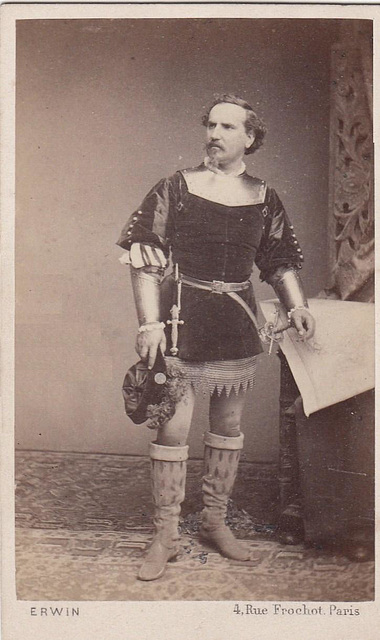
Emilio Naudin as Vasco da Gama in L'Africaine 1865

Emilio Naudin (23 October 1823 in Parma – 5 May 1890 in Bologna) was an Italian tenor. He is most notable for creating the role of Vasco da Gama in Meyerbeer's opera L'Africaine.

== Training and career ==
Emilio Naudin studied singing in Milan with Giacomo Panizza. After completing his studies, he began his career as a tenor, being particularly successful in operas by Verdi, and sang in operas by that composer as well as others at leading theatres in Italy, Spain, and England. He appeared at the Royal Opera House, London, for ten consecutive seasons between 1863 and 1872. In Paris, he sang at the Paris Opera from 1862 until 1867 in operas by Verdi, Donizetti, Mozart, and others.

The composer of French grand operas, Giacomo Meyerbeer, died before the first production of his final opera L'Africaine but left instructions in his will that the opera's leading role, of Vasco da Gama, must be created by Naudin. The tenor agreed to sing the role, in French, for an enormous fee. After his great success in that part, he sang with the Paris Opera for two more years, and then moved into Wagnerian repertoire, singing Lohengrin (in Italian) in England and Tannhäuser in Moscow.

Naudin was praised for his clear and easy to hear voice and his elegance onstage, although his powers of acting were apparently limited. He abandoned his career due to an illness which caused progressive paralysis, of which he died.
