= Victor Warot =

Belgian opera singer

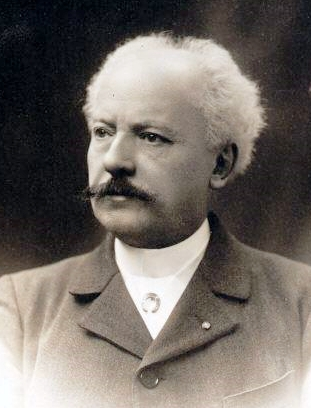
Victor Warot in later life

Victor Alexandre Joseph Warot (French: [viktɔʁ waʁo]; 18 September 1834, Verviers – 29 March 1906, Bois-Colombes) was a Belgian opera singer. He began his career as a lyric tenor but later grew into a fine dramatic singer. He was particularly known for his portrayal of Wagner and Meyerbeer heroes.

== Early life ==
Warot was born in Verviers into a musical and theatrical family. His father was the tenor Victor Alexandre Charles Warot (1808-1877) and his mother the actress Cécile née Desthieux. His uncle, (Constant Noel) Adolphe Warot (1812-1875) was a well-known cellist while a second uncle, (Victor Alexandre) Charles Warot (1804-1836) was a composer and conductor. Warot's grandfather Charles (François) Warot had been prompter at the Antwerp Theatre. Victor Warot fils studied initially with his father and then in Paris with Giulio Alary.

== Musical career ==
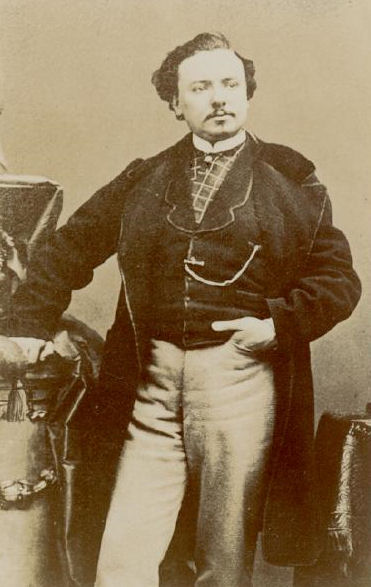
Victor Warot as a young tenor

He made his professional opera début at the Opéra-Comique in 1858 in Armand Limnander's Les monténégrins followed by that of George Brown in La Dame Blanche. In 1859 he created the role of The Reaper ('Le Faucheur') in the premiere of Meyerbeer's Le pardon de Ploërmel, while other roles at this time included Bénédict in Auber's L'ambassadrice, Lord Latimer in Thomas's Le songe d'une nuit d'été, Luidgi in Gabrielli's Don Gregorio, the title-role in Fra Diavolo and de Mergy in Le pré aux clercs. In 1860 he sang the role of Beppe in the premiere of Donizetti's Rita and created the role of Saëb in Offenbach's Barkouf, while in 1861 he played Tonio in La fille du régiment, Antonio in Duprato’s Salvator Rosa, and Max in Le Beauté du diable. In 1862 he took on the title-role in Le postillon de Lonjumeau and played Lorédan Grimani in Haydée, ou Le secret and Azor in Zémire et Azor.

From 1861 until 1869 he was engaged at the Paris Opera where he portrayed roles in several world premieres, including Tebaldo in Victor Massé’s La mule de Pedro (1863) and Don Alvaro in Meyerbeer's L'Africaine (1865). He also sang Don Ottavio in Don Giovanni, the title hero in Le comte Ory, Henri in Les vêpres siciliennes, and Masaniello in La muette de Portici.

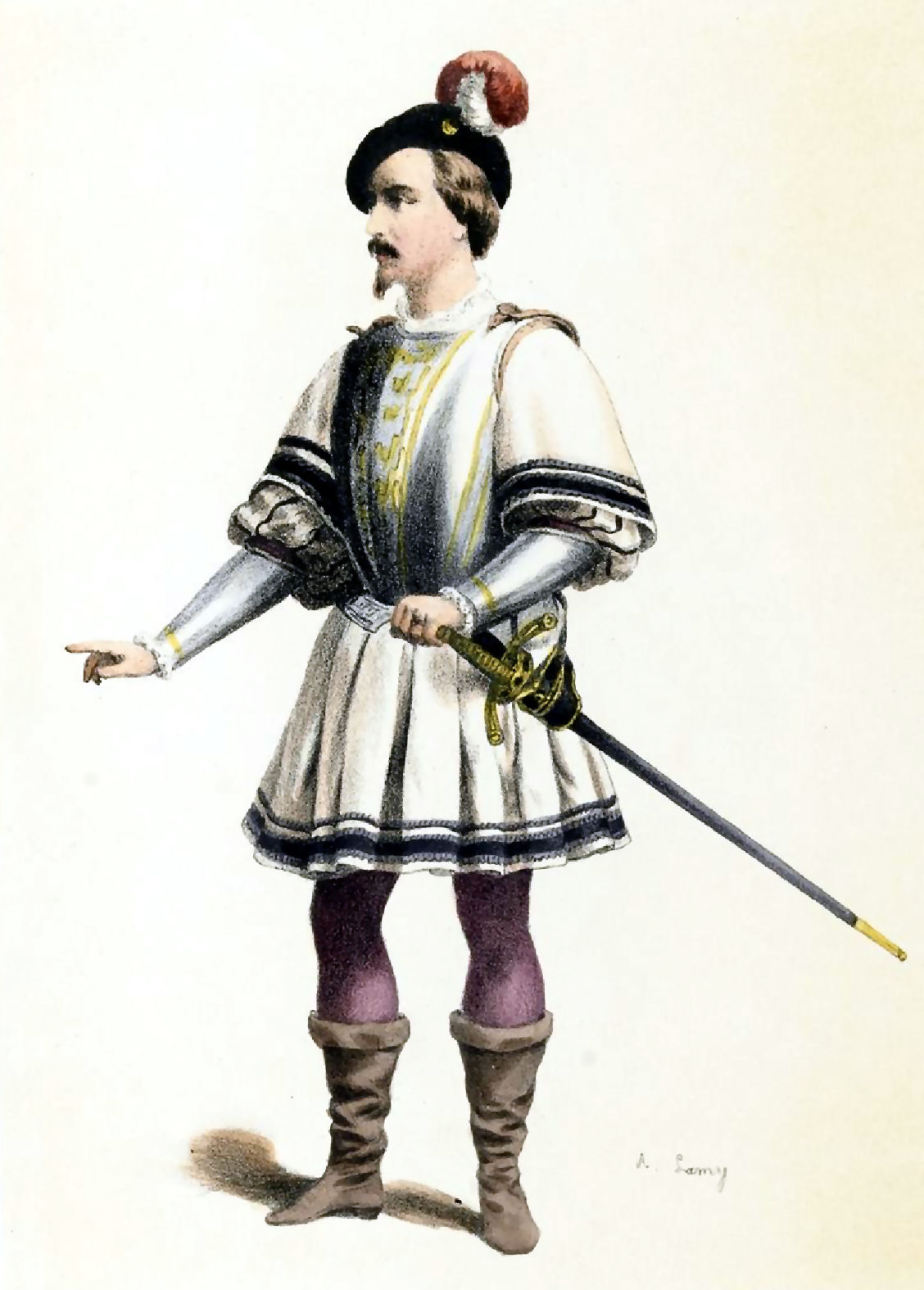
As Don Alvaro in Meyerbeer's L'Africaine

Warot appeared on the concert platform in David’s Le désert and Christoph Colomb, in Berlioz’s L'enfance du Christ and in Pergoleisi’s Stabat Mater. During this period he appeared in two operas which would be significant throughout his career, as Léopold in La Juive and Alphonse in La muette de Portici. In the following year he appeared as Henri in Les vêpres siciliennes. He sang Amenophis in Moïse, played Daniel in Boulanger’s Le Docteur Magnus, sang Guillaume in Auber's Le Philtre and appeared as 'a shepherd' in the 1864 premier of Mermet's Roland à Roncevaux and sang in Meyerbeer's L'Africaine. In 1865 he married the young dance student Marie-Ann Léger; they would remain together until her death in 1904.

Warot was committed to La Monnaie from 1868 to 1876 where he portrayed such parts as Riccardo in Un ballo in maschera, Manrico in Il trovatore, Erik in The Flying Dutchman, the title role in Tannhäuser, Raoul in Les Huguenots, Eléazar in La Juive, and John of Leyden in Le prophète. From 1876 until his retirement from the stage in 1888 he remained active as a freelance artist at major opera houses in France and Belgium.

== Later life ==
Warot devoted himself to teaching singing after his opera career ended, in 1886 becoming professor at the Paris Conservatoire in the place of Marc Bonnehée who had recently died. Although Warot occasionally still appeared on the concert platform he now began another successful career as a teacher and administrator. A number of his pupils went on to have successful careers, including Lucienne Bréval, Edmond Clément, Jeanne Hatto, and Lina Pacary. In 1885 he was appointed an Officier of the Académie française and in 1903 he was awarded the Légion d’Honneur. In 1902 he published a book, Bréviaire du chanteur. He died in Bois-Colombes in 1906.
