= Klim (given name) =

Klim is a masculine given name, sometimes a diminutive form of Kliment. It is borne by:

- Klim Churyumov (1937–2016), Soviet and Ukrainian astronomer
- Klim Gavrilov (born 2000), Russian race car driver
- Klim Kostin (born 1999), Russian ice hockey player
- Klim Prykhodko (born 2000), Ukrainian footballer
- Klim Shipenko (born 1983), Russian film director, screenwriter, actor and producer
- Kliment Voroshilov (1881–1969), Soviet officer and politician, Marshal of the Soviet Union and Chairman of the Presidium of the Supreme Soviet
- Klim Savur, pseudonym of Dmytro Klyachkivsky (1911–1945), a commander of the Ukrainian Insurgent Army during World War II
- the title character of The Life of Klim Samgin, a four-volume novel by Maxim Gorky
