= Edmond Clément =

French opera singer (1867–1928)

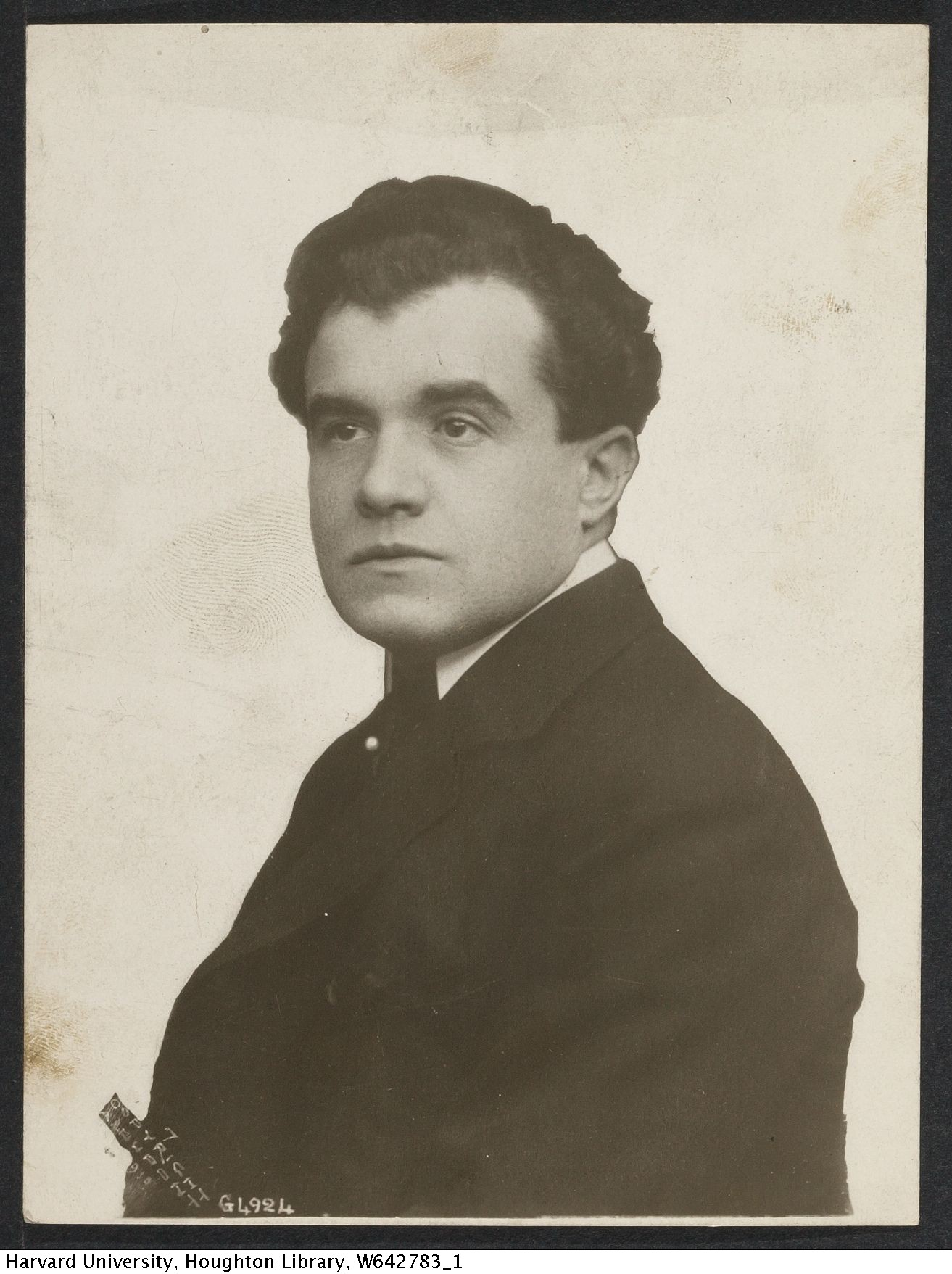

Background information
- Born: Frédéric-Jean Clément; 1867; Paris, France
- Died: 23 February 1928, age of 61 Nice, France
- Genre: Opera
- Occupations: Singer, Teacher
- Instrument: Voice

Edmond Clément (28 March 1867, Paris - 24 February 1928, Nice) was a French lyric tenor who earned an international reputation due to the polished artistry of his singing. During his career he also held a private studio, one of his students being the internationally recognized soprano Marie Sundelius.

== Biography ==
Clément began his studies at the Conservatoire de Paris with Victor Warot, subsequently making his debut at the Opéra-Comique in 1889, as Vincent in Mireille. He was the theater's principle tenor until 1909, appearing in many roles such as Ottavio, Tamino, Almaviva, Georges Brown, Fra Diavolo, Gérald, des Grieux, Werther and Hoffmann, along with many more. Such roles were the bulk of his repertoire and qualified him to be considered between a Lyrischer Tenor and Italienischer tenor.

He was part of the inaugural performance of Le Juif polonais by Camille Erlanger and Hélène by Camille Saint-Saëns, and sang in the Parisian premieres of Falstaff and Madama Butterfly.

When he reached his 40s, his career had begun moving Westward. He was not only popular in Paris and began singing in Brussels, Monte Carlo, Madrid and London, although he never appeared at the Royal Opera House, Covent Garden. He was invited to come to the United States and he quickly joined the stellar roster of singers at the Metropolitan Opera in New York City, where he performed from 1909-1910. He faced competition from the equally popular Italian verismo tenor Enrico Caruso and was quickly overwhelmed, as Clement's more bel canto style was not in high demand at the time. Because of Caruso's growing prestige as a verismo tenor, Clement was not re-signed by the Met's management. While in New York City, he kept his voice in performance shape by taking lessons from the noted pedagogue Frederick Bristol. However, he would find his audience in Boston.

After his time at the MET, from 1911 to 1913 he began singing at the Boston Opera House. Audiences at the theater admired him for his stylish vocalism, exemplary diction and elegant stage presence during his engagements with the Boston Opera Company, thanks in part to his bel canto elegance and dexterous technique. Although his voice was not large, he was considered to be one of the leading Roméos and Don Josés of his era by dint of his musicianship. He was also considered incredibly handsome and possessed developed acting skills for the stage.

Clément returned to his homeland when the First World War erupted in 1914 and was wounded subsequently while serving with the French army. America heard him again during the early 1920s when he travelled across the Atlantic for concert and recital appearances. His last years were spent in semi-retirement in France and are considered his declining period. He gave his last recital in Nice at the age of 60 in 1927. He died on February 24, 1928, in Nice at the age of 61.

== Legacy ==
He is represented on recordings which he made in France and the United States for the Odeon, Victor and Pathe companies. These recordings, which have been reissued on CD, consist mainly of operatic arias from his core repertoire. They are helpful in elucidating the vibrant culture of Italian-influenced French, operatic artistry.

== Dedications ==
In 1911, the French-American composer and conductor H. Maurice Jacquet dedicated his mélodie "Chanson de l'Inconstant" [Song of the inconsistent] to him.

== Roles ==
Edmond Clement is noted to have sung over 40 roles during his professional career, before retiring at 60 to focus on teaching, as well as perform in smaller concerts and recitals.

	Role	Opera	Composer
1.	Ernesto	Don Pasquale	Gaetano Donizetti
2.	Tonio	La Fille du Regiment	Gaetano Donizetti
3.	Cavaradossi	Tosca	Giacomo Puccini
4.	Rodolfo	La Bohème	Giacomo Puccini
5.	Alfredo	La Traviata	Giuseppe Verdi
6.	Fenton	Falstaff	Giuseppe Verdi
7.	Werther	Werther	Jules Massenet
8.	Grieux	Manon	Jules Massenet
9.	Tamino	Die Zauberflöte	Wolfgang A. Mozart
10.	Don Ottavio	Don Giovanni	Wolfgang A. Mozart
11.	Dominique	L'Attaque du Moulin	Alfred Bruneau
12.	Sentinel	L'Attaque du Moulin	Alfred Bruneau
13.	Pitou	La Fille de Madame Angot	Charles Lecocq
14.	Mylio	Le Roi d'Ys	Édouard Lalo
15.	Don José	Carmen	Georges Bizet
16.	Nicias	Phrynée	Camille Saint-Saëns
17.	Daniel	Le Chalet	Adolph Adam
18.	Gérald	Lakmé	Leo Delibes
19.	Georges Brown	La Dame Blanche	François-Adrien Boieldieu
20.	Fra Diavolo	Fra Diavolo	Daniel Auber
21.	Count Almaviva	Il Barbiere di Siviglia	Gioachino Rossini
22.	Hoffmann	Les Contes d'Hoffmann	Jacques Offenbach
23.	Andrea	Benvenuto	Eugène Diaz
24.	Jacquemin	Le Flibustier	Cesar Cui
25.	Georges	La Vivandière	Benjamin Godard
26.	Landry	Xavière	Théodore Dubois
27.	Loti in	L'Île du Rêve	Reynaldo Hahn
28.	Christian	Le Juif Polonais	Frédéric Alfred d'Erlanger
29.	Pedrito	La Cabrera	Gabriel Dupont
30.	Jean-Simon	Le Clos	Charles Silver

== Recordings ==
1. Adieu, for voice and piano by G. Faure (Pathé Records, 1925)
2. Edmond Clement, An Historical Recording (Delta Records, 1964)
3. Edmond Clement: French Opera and Mèlodies; Traditional Chansons (Pearl Records, 1995)
4. Edmond Clément: The Complete Odéon (1905) and Victor (1911-13) Recordings (Romophone, 1995 and Masterworks)
5. Edmond Clement: Edmont Clément: The Most Famous Recordings (Vocal Archives, 1998)
6. Edmond Clement: The Complete Pathe Recordings, 1916-1925 (Romophone, 2000)
7. Edmond Clement: The Legendary French Tenor, 1911-14 (Minerva Recordings, 2011)
