= Michael Clement =

American accountant

Michael Clement is an American accountant, currently the KPMG Centennial Professor at University of Texas at Austin.
