= Kliment =

Kliment (Cyrillic: Климент) is a male given name, a Slavic form of the Late Latin name Clement. A diminutive form is Klim. Notable people:

- Kliment Boyadzhiev (1861—1933), Bulgarian general during the Balkan Wars and World War I
- Kliment Kolesnikov (born 2000), Russian swimmer
- Klyment Kvitka (1880—1953), Ukrainian musicologist and ethnographer
- Kliment Nastoski (born 1987), Macedonian footballer
- Kliment Red'ko (1897—1956), Russian avant-garde painter
- Kliment Smoliatich, Ancient Rus Orthodox metropolitan bishop (1147—1155)
- Kliment of Tarnovo (1841—1901), Bulgarian clergyman and politician
- Kliment Taseski (born 1991), Australian footballer
- Kliment Timiryazev (1843—1920), Russian botanist and physiologist, promoter of Darwinism
- Kliment Voroshilov (1881—1969), Soviet military officer and politician, Marshal of the Soviet Union

== See also ==
- Clement (name)
- Jan Kliment (born 19 May 1974), Czech dancer
- Jan Kliment (born 1 September 1993), Czech footballer
- Clement of Ohrid
- Klimenti, Albanian clan
