= Clément Tyres =

Franco-Italian cycle tyre manufacturer

Clément Tyres, Clément Pneumatics, Clément Pneumatici, is a Franco-Italian tyre manufacturer that was founded by French industrialist and bicycle manufacturer Adolphe Clément-Bayard, possibly around the 1900s. The brand ceased active trading in the 1990s but was revived under American identity in 2010.

== History ==
Adolphe Clément began manufacture of tyres in 1878 for his early cycles, but the French identity was lost when, in 1889, he became the French licensee for manufacture of Dunlop pneumatic tyres with their subsequent overwhelming success.

Clément Pneumatici was probably established in Italy in the 1900s, but after World War I it grew to prominence in Italy, as a leading supplier of bicycle tyres, which it sustained throughout most of the 20th century. A leading international manufacturer during the 1950s, 1960s and 1970s, it was associated with racing cyclists such as Eddy Merckx, Jacques Anquetil, Felice Gimondi, and Ole Ritter. It was purchased by Pirelli in the 1980s and manufacturing was moved to Thailand until 1995 when Pirelli vacated the bicycle tyre market. Various licensing arrangements were of little consequence until, in 2010 the name was licensed to Donnelly Sports and the American, Don Kellogg, who recommenced manufacture in Taiwan by Hwa Fong tire Co. In 2017, Donnelly ended their licensing agreement with Pirelli, who was re-entering the bicycle tire market, and re-branded all of their Colorado-based designs under the Donnelly name.
