= Dinorah =

Opéra comique with music by Giacomo Meyerbeer

Dinorah Le pardon de Ploërmel
- Opéra comique by Giacomo Meyerbeer
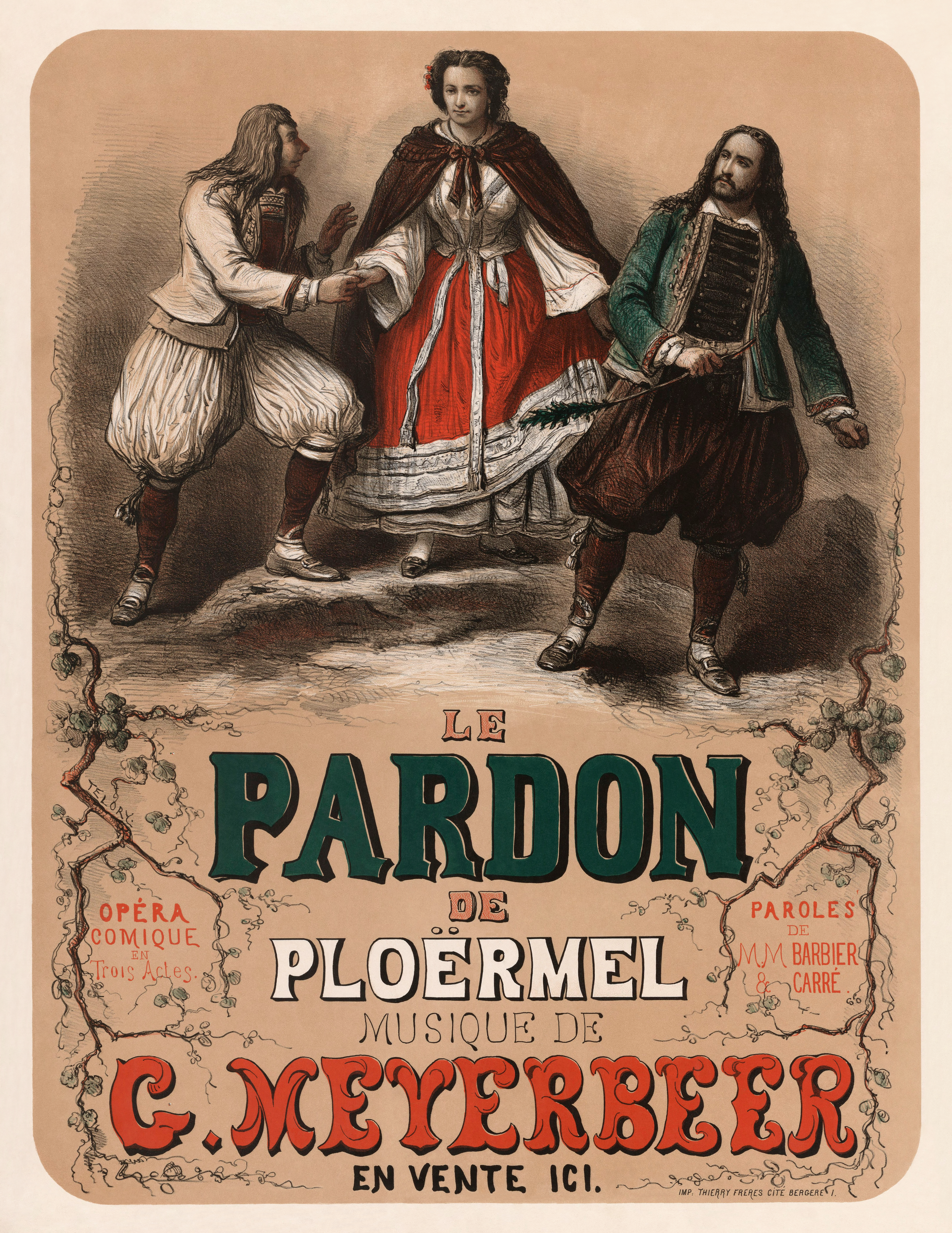
- Poster for the premiere depicting Corentin, Dinorah, and Hoël
- Librettist: Jules Barbier; Michel Carré
- Language: French
- Based on: Breton tales
- Premiere: 4 April 1859; Opéra-Comique

Dinorah, originally Le pardon de Ploërmel (The Pardon of Ploërmel), is an 1859 French opéra comique in three acts with music by Giacomo Meyerbeer and a libretto by Jules Barbier and Michel Carré. The story takes place near the rural town of Ploërmel and is based on two Breton tales by Émile Souvestre, "La Chasse aux trésors" and "Le Kacouss de l'Armor", both published separately in 1850 in the Revue des deux mondes.

== Roles ==
Roles, voice types, and premiere cast
Role	Voice type	Premiere cast, 4 April 1859 (Conductor: Meyerbeer)
Dinorah, a peasant girl	coloratura soprano	Marie Cabel
Shepherd	soprano	Breuillé
Shepherd	mezzo-soprano	Emma Belia
Corentin, a bag-piper	tenor	Charles-Louis Sainte-Foy
Goatherd	soprano	Dupuy
Goatherd	soprano	Marguerite Decroix
Hoël, a goat-herd	baritone	Jean-Baptiste Faure
A huntsman	bass	Barreille
A harvester	tenor	Victor Warot
Loïc	baritone	Lemaire
Claude	tenor	Palianti
Chorus: peasants and villagers

Role creators

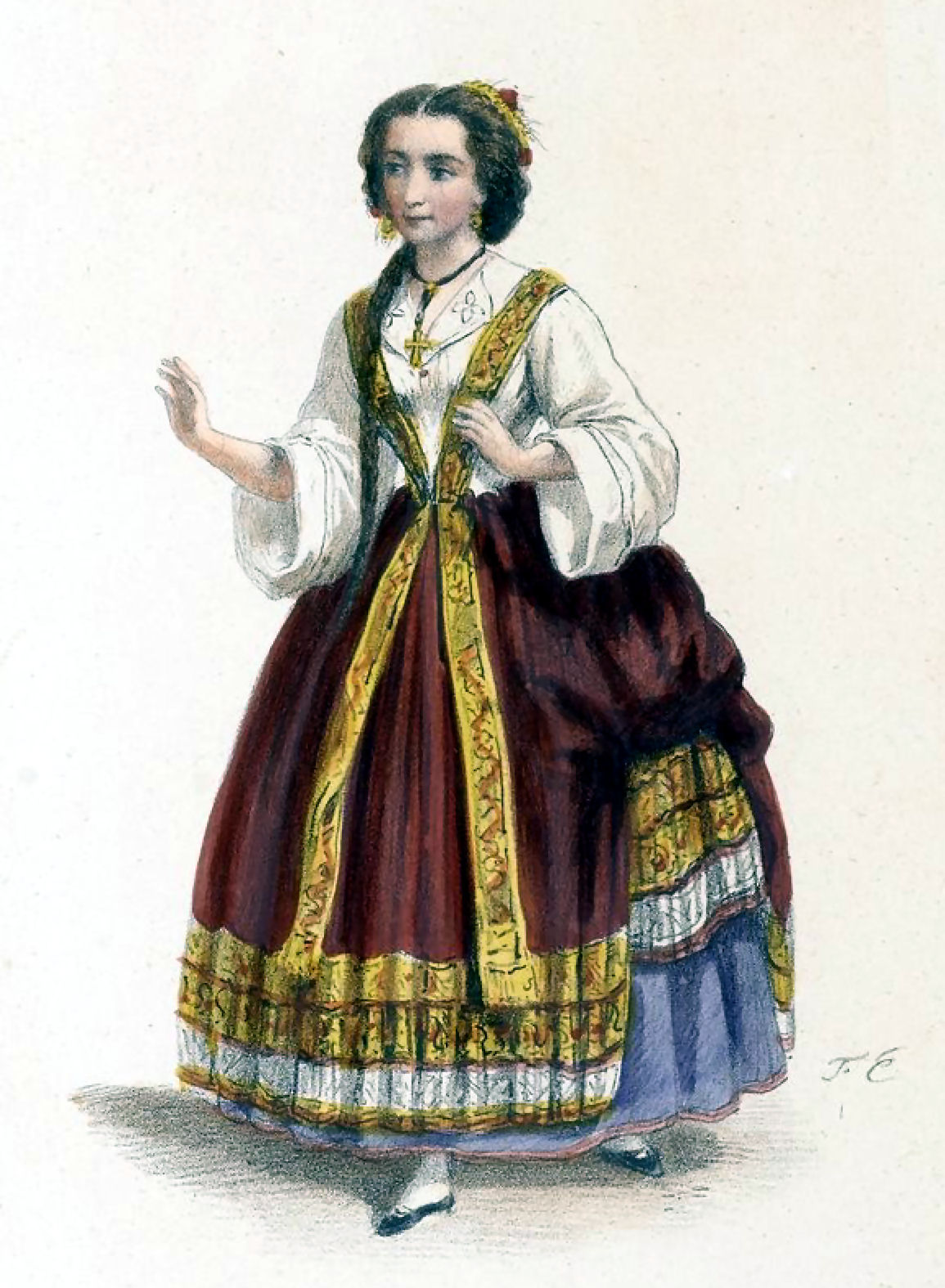
Marie Cabel

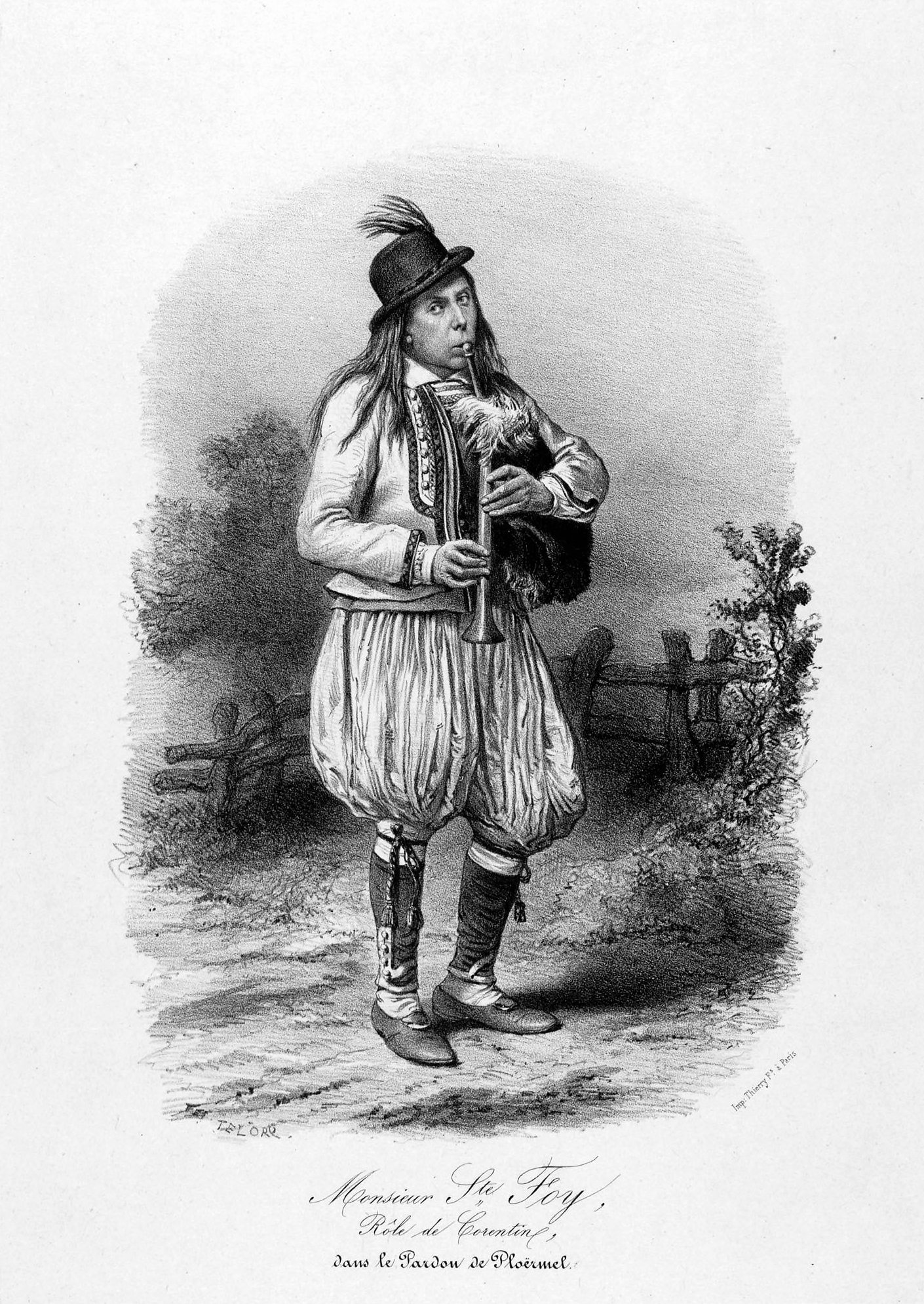
Sainte-Foy

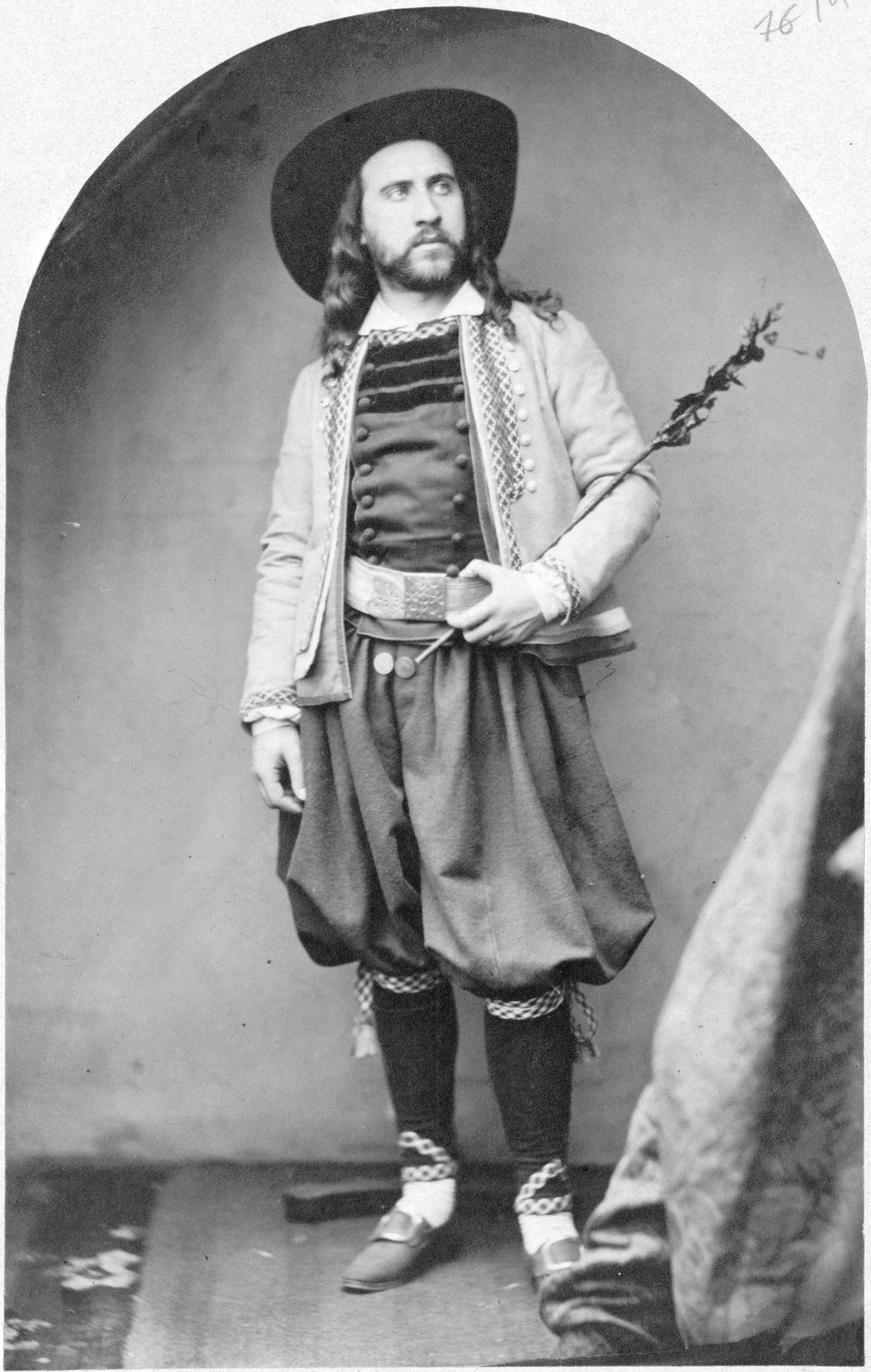
J-B Faure

== Synopsis ==
Time: Nineteenth century
Place: Brittany

=== Act 1 ===
In the Breton village of Ploërmel, a rugged and wild site illuminated by the last rays of the setting sun with, in the foreground, Corentin's cottage

During the annual pilgrimage to the chapel of the Virgin, Dinorah has gone mad because her bridegroom Hoël disappeared following a storm that interrupted their wedding on the same day the previous year. Dinorah has lost her pet goat Bellah but, believing she has found it, she sings a lullaby to the goat and then walks away (Berceuse: Bellah, ma chèvre chérie). Hoël returns to the village, having discovered the whereabouts of a treasure. He enlists Corentin to help him recover the riches, but not without sinister intent, since according to the legend, the first to touch them will perish.

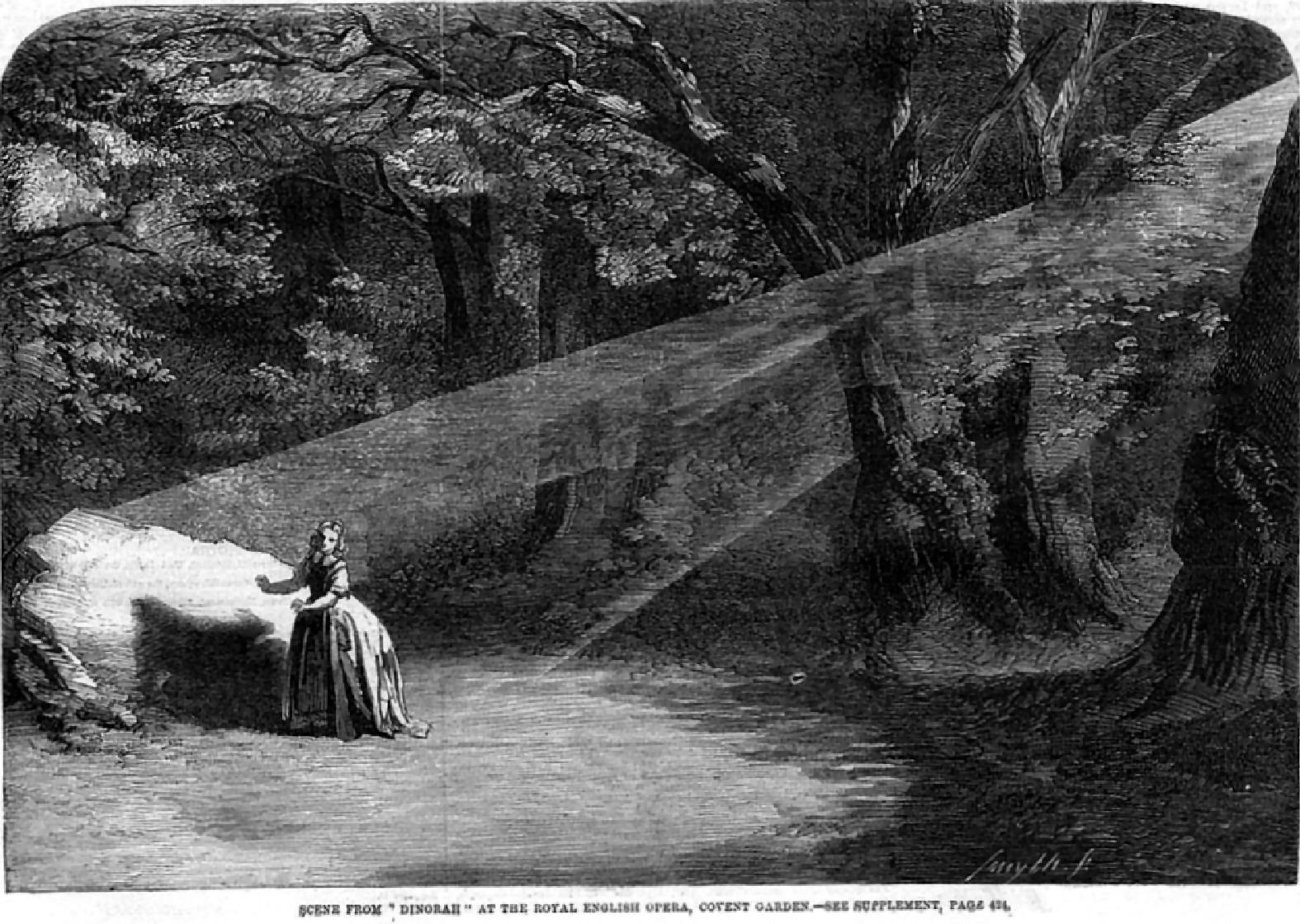
Act 2, scene 1, Dinorah dances with her shadow (London, 1859)

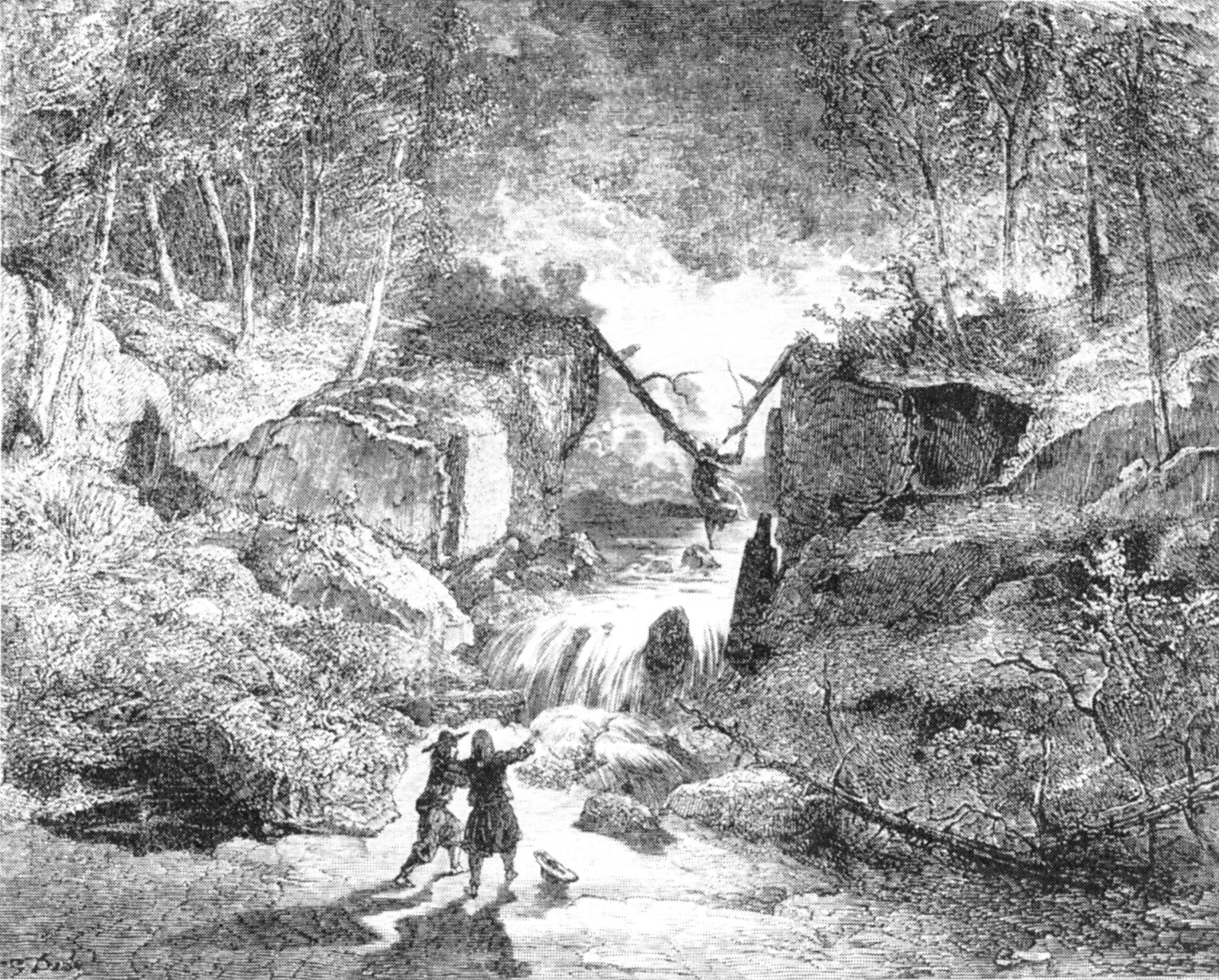
Mühldorfers' design for act 2, scene 2

=== Act 2 ===
==== Scene 1 ====
A birch wood lit by the moon

Dinorah imagined she heard Hoël's voice and followed it into the wood, but once there, she weeps to find herself alone (Romance: Me voici, Hoël doit m’attendre ici). A moonbeam falls on her and casts its shadow on her feet. Imagining that it is the day before her wedding, she sings and dances with her shadow (Air: Ombre légère).

==== Scene 2 ====
A mysterious valley

Hoël and Corentin descend upon the cache where Dinorah also happens to be. From her, Corentin learns about the legend, and later he and Hoël invite each other first to inspect the treasure. During that time, Dinorah, in pursuit of her pet goat, steps on a tree trunk by a river as it is hit by lightning, and falls in the water and is swept away by the current. Hoël having witnessed the scene leaps to her rescue.

=== Act 3 ===
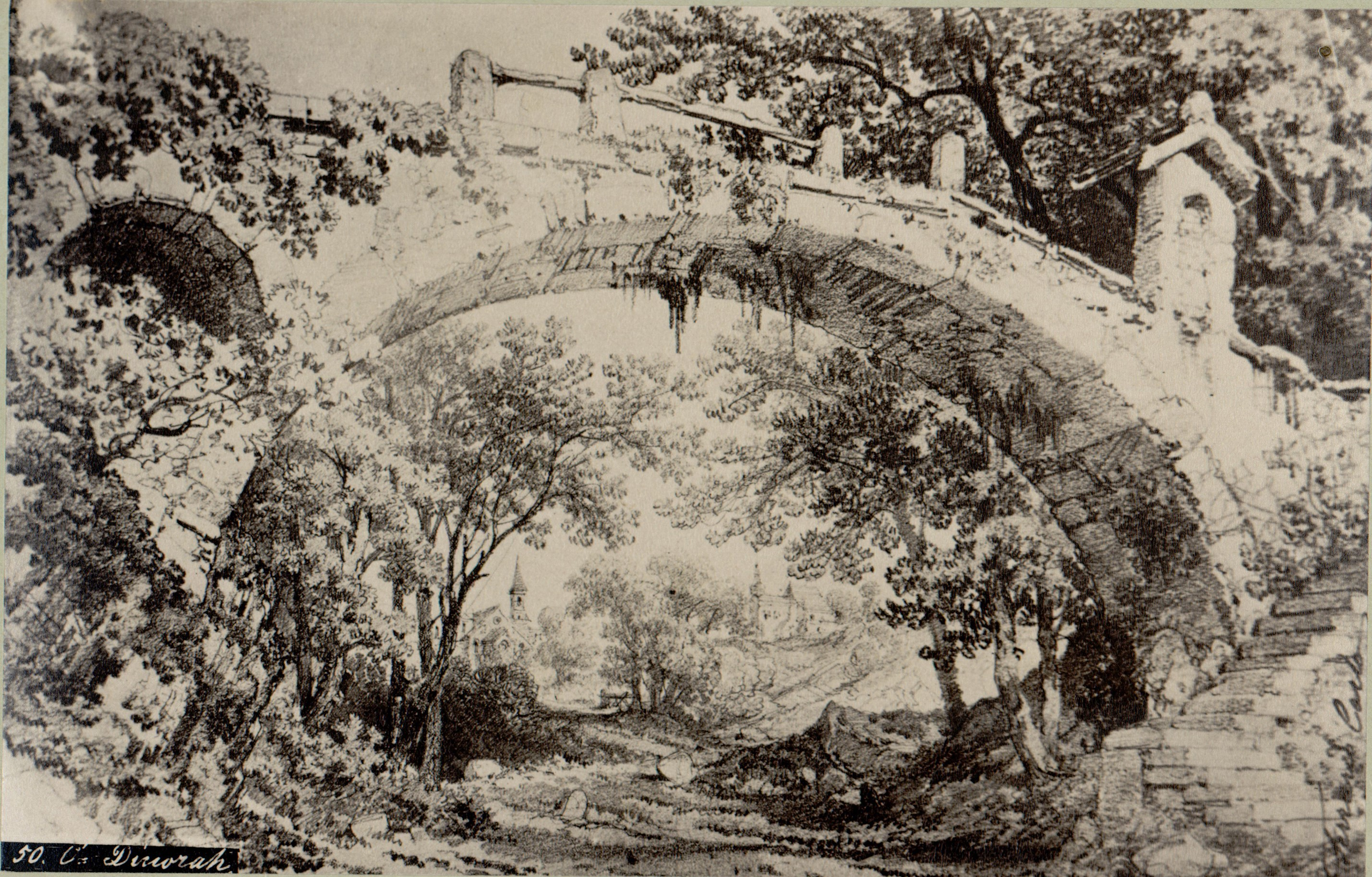
Un sito agreste, set design for Dinorah act 3 scene 1 (1870).

Hoël admits his love and regrets to Dinorah as she regains consciousness (Romance: Ah ! mon remords te venge). She recognizes him and regains her sanity. The villagers arrive and sing a hymn of forgiveness and lead the two lovers to the chapel where they will be married.

== Performance history ==
The opera was premiered on 4 April 1859 by the Opéra-Comique at the second Salle Favart in Paris. The stage designs for acts 1 and 3 were by Edouard-Désiré-Joseph Despléchin and Jean-Louis Chéret. Those for the more technically demanding act 2, which included onstage running water, were by Joseph and Karl Wilhelm Mühldorfer.

The principal singers were highly acclaimed: "Marie Cabel for her vertiginous-virtuoso interpretation of Dinorah; Sainte-Foy for his overwhelmingly convincing characterization of Corentin, lyrically as well as dramatically; Jean-Baptiste Faure for his fascinating stage presence as Hoël, Meyerbeer's first big baritone role." The supporting singers were also greatly admired, in particular, Barreille as the huntsman and Warot as the harvester. Meyerbeer's music was praised for its originality, but the libretto was found incomprehensible and even met with derision. In the initial run of performances up to the end of 1859, changes were made, the most significant being the casting of the contralto Palmyre Wertheimber in the role of Hoël.

The opera remained very successful in Paris up to 1912. Under its original title it was revived at the Opéra-Comique on 27 August 1874, 23 May 1881, 6 June 1896, and 16 March 1912, by which time it had been performed over 200 times by the company. It was revived in Brussels as late as 11 January 1939.

Meyerbeer composed recitatives to replace the spoken dialog for performances abroad. The opera was translated into Italian by Achille de Lauzières for the premiere in London on 26 July 1859 (with Miolan-Carvalho) and became known internationally as Dinorah, but it was first performed in America on 4 March 1861 at the French Opera House in New Orleans in French.

Dinorah was performed in New York (at the Academy of Music) in Italian on 24 November 1862. As a novelty, it attracted a great deal of attention and (starring the now nearly forgotten Angelina Cordier) was very popular. One of its attractions was to be the appearance of an actual, live goat on stage, which "inspired a vast dissemination of facetious goat-lore in all the papers." Unfortunately, the opera followed close on the heels of a highly successful production of Bellini's Norma, and Meyerbeer's work suffered by comparison. The reviewer in Dwight's Music (6 December 1862) was highly critical, writing: "Beside such music as this (the heaviest of light operas), Bellini's melodies are golden and Rossini's operas classic."

Nevertheless, Dinorah was initially performed quite often outside France and became a great favorite of Adelina Patti, but was rarely performed during the latter half of the 20th century except for the famous virtuoso aria for soprano "Ombre légère", also known as "The Shadow Song", in which Dinorah sings to and then dances with her shadow. Other sopranos who have enjoyed considerable success in the role of Dinorah include Amelita Galli-Curci, Ilma di Murska, Georgina Schubert, Luisa Tetrazzini, Maria Barrientos, and Lily Pons.

Illustrations from The Victrola Book of the Opera (1919)

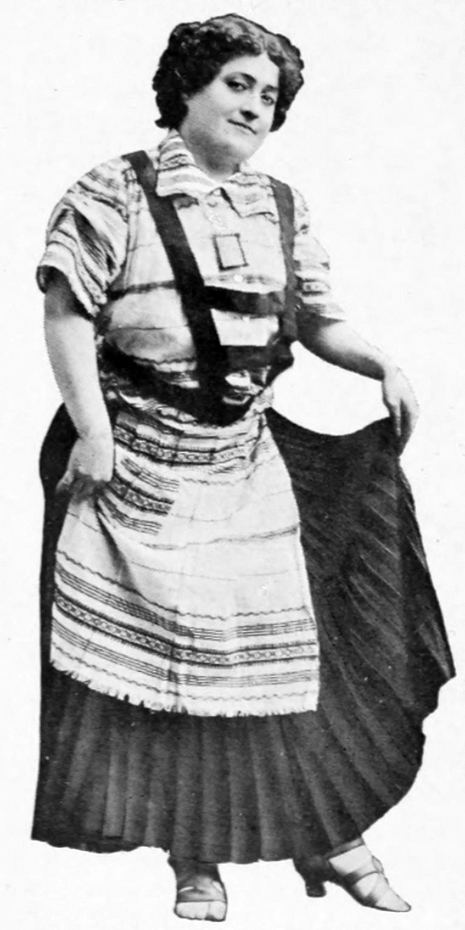
Tetrazzini as Dinorah

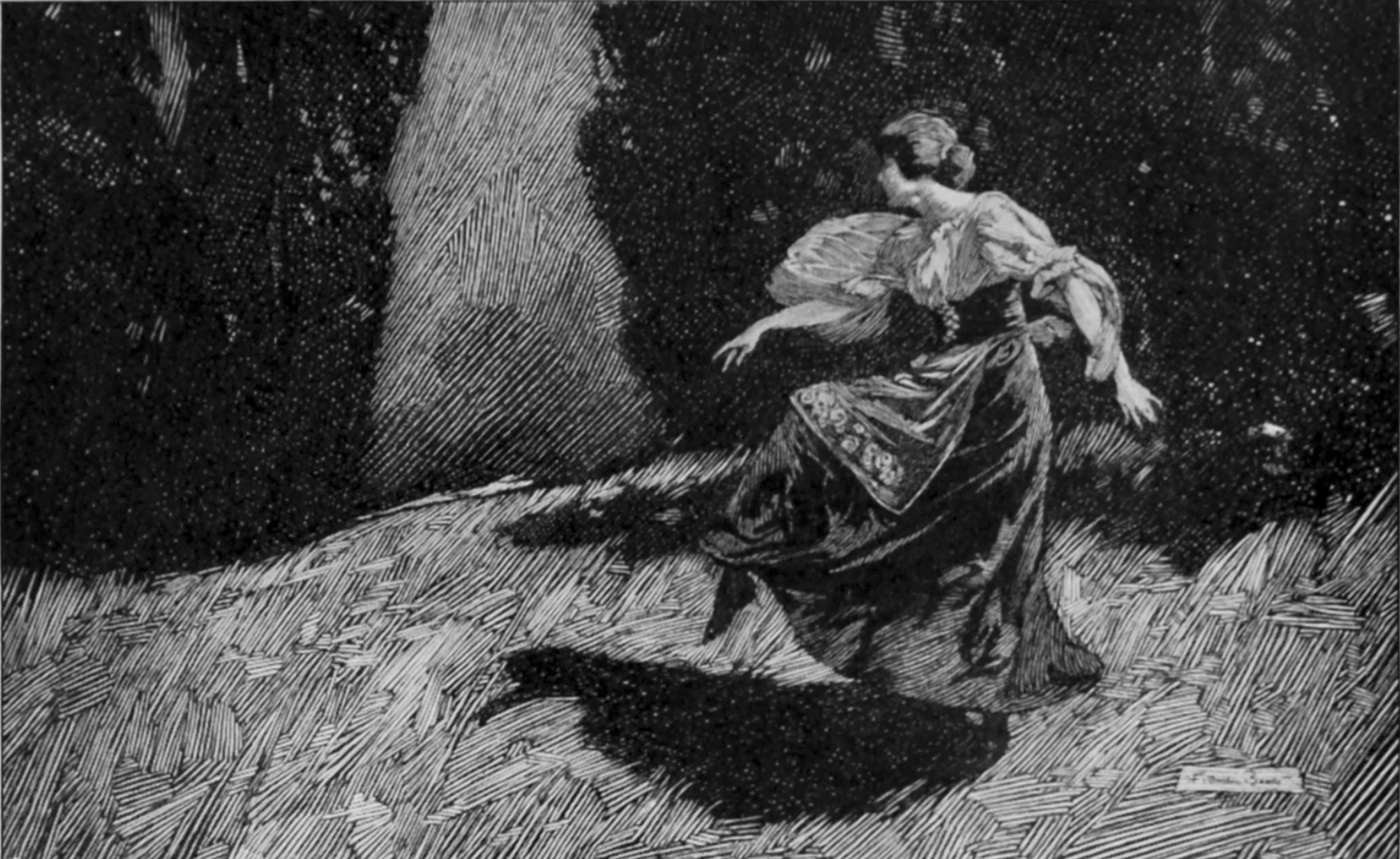
"The Shadow Song"

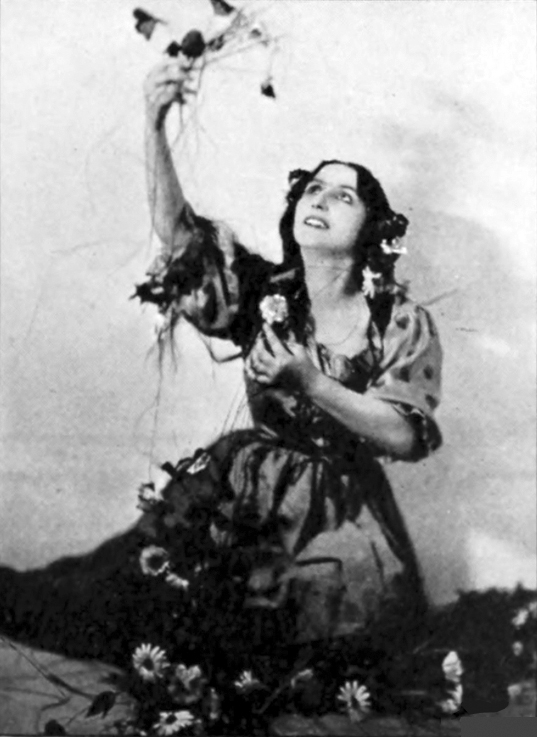
Galli-Curci as Dinorah

Although the opera has been largely neglected during the latter half of the last century, a rare broadcast performance of the overture by Arturo Toscanini and the NBC Symphony Orchestra from 12 November 1938, has been preserved. This unusual overture has several sections with chorus, and ample percussion, and has been compared favorably with those of Rossini and Verdi.

Meyerbeer's operas have become performed more often in Europe in the 21st century. Dinorah received stagings in Dortmund and Parma in 2000 and in Compiègne in 2002. A concert performance of the opera was given by the Deutsche Oper Berlin, in 2014, which was recorded.

Dinorah was presented in full production by New York City's Amore Opera from March 19 to 23, 2019, at the Riverside Theatre.

== Recordings ==
Audio

- Dinorah – Deborah Cook (Dinorah), Christian du Plessis (Hoël), Alexander Oliver (Corentin) – Geoffrey Mitchell Choir, Philarmonia Orchestra – James Judd (conductor) – Opera Rara (1979)
- Dinorah – Patrizia Ciofi (Dinorah), Étienne Dupuis (Hoël), Phiippe Talbot (Corentin) – Chorus and Orchestra of Deutsche Oper Berlin – Enrique Mazzola (conductor) – cpo (2014)
- The aria "Ombre légère" has been recorded by many coloratura sopranos, including Maria Callas, Joan Sutherland, Anna Moffo, June Anderson and Natalie Dessay.

Video

- Isabelle Philippe (Dinorah), Armand Arapian (Hoël), Frédéric Mazzotta (Corentin) – Théâtre français de la musique, Cori Spezzatti, Orchestre de L’Opéra d’Etat Hongrais Failoni, Olivier Opdebeeck (conductor), Pierre Jourdan (adaptation and production) – Recorded in performance in October 2002 at the Théâtre impérial de Compiègne. Cascavelle DVDELD7000 (PAL, Region 0). OCLC 717423316. Kultur D4013 (NTSC, Region 1) ISBN 978-0-7697-7983-6.

== Libretto and scores ==
Meyerbeer's manuscripts have not been found, and most published libretti reflect cuts to the score made in almost all productions. A complete libretto has recently been published by Cambridge Scholars Publishing as part of the series Giacomo Meyerbeer: The Complete Libretti in Eleven Volumes. The following are the early printed sources which were used in the preparation of that libretto:

- Le Pardon de Ploërmel; opéra-comique en trois actes. Paris: Brandus & Dufour, 1859. (First edition of the full orchestral score with spoken dialogue.)
- Le Pardon de Ploërmel; opéra en trois actes. "Edition contenant les récitatifs et les morceaux ajoutés par l’auteur." Paris: Benoit, 1885. (Score with sung recitatives in place of spoken dialog.)
- Le Pardon de Ploërmel; opéra-comique en trois actes. Paris: Michel Lévy Frères, 1859. (Second edition of the libretto used for additional stage directions and scenic descriptions.)
