= Clements, West Virginia =

Unincorporated community in West Virginia, United States

Clements
- Unincorporated community
- Location within the state of West Virginia Clements (the United States)
- Coordinates: 39°3′12″N 80°0′52″W
- Country: United States
- State: West Virginia
- County: Barbour
- Elevation: 1,595 ft (486 m)
- Time zone: UTC-5 (Eastern (EST))
  - Summer (DST): UTC-4 (EDT)
- GNIS ID: 1697030

Clements was an unincorporated community in Barbour County, West Virginia.
