= Pope Clement =

There have been fourteen popes named Clement.

- Pope Clement I (saint; 88–98)
- Pope Clement II (1046–1047)
  - Antipope Clement III (1080–1085)
- Pope Clement III (1187–1191)
- Pope Clement IV (1265–1268)
- Pope Clement V (1305–1314)
- Pope Clement VI (1342–1352)
  - Antipope Clement VII (1378–1394)
  - Antipope Clement VIII (1423–1429)
- Pope Clement VII (1523–1534)
- Pope Clement VIII (1592–1605)
- Pope Clement IX (1667–1669)
- Pope Clement X (1670–1676)
- Pope Clement XI (1700–1721)
- Pope Clement XII (1730–1740)
- Pope Clement XIII (1758–1769)
- Pope Clement XIV (1769–1774)
