= Uta Klement =

Researcher

- Born: December 18, 1962 (age 63)
- Citizenship: German
- Education: Georg-August-Universität Göttingen, Germany
- Scientific career
- Fields: Materials Science
- Workplaces: Chalmers University of Technology
- Thesis: In-situ –HVEM-investigations of the early stages of recrystallization in Cu-0.2 at.% Mn-single crystals (1991)
- Doctoral advisor: Prof. P. Haasen

Uta Klement (born 18 December 1962) is a senior professor at Chalmers University of Technology who works in the field of materials science with emphasis on electron microscopy.

== Education ==
She completed her diploma in material physics in the year 1987 from Georg-August-Universität Göttingen, Germany. The title of her thesis is Recrystallization experiments on <111> tensile deformed copper single crystals supervised by Prof. P. Haasen. She then carried on to do a PhD in the same university and the title of her PhD thesis is 'In-situ HVEM-investigations of the early stages of recrystallization in Cu-0.2 at.% Mn-single crystals', also supervised by Prof. P. Haasen.

== Profession ==
After her PhD, she worked for a year and a half as a post-doctoral fellow on a project titled 'Thermal stability of electrodeposited nanocrystalline Ni' at the department of Metallurgy and Materials Science in the University of Toronto, Canada. After brief stints as a research fellow at different institutes in Germany, she joined the department of Industrial and Materials Science at Chalmers University of Technology, Gothenburg, Sweden as a professor in the year 1999. Currently, she is the head of the division of Materials and Manufacture, at the department.

Her research area includes the application of electron microscopy (TEM, SEM) and complementary techniques as measuring tools to investigate the structure-property relationship of engineering materials (eg- nanomaterials, electroplating, thermal spray coatings, tool-workpiece interaction in machining). She heads the Surface and Microstructure Engineering research group and within her research activities particular focus is put on the development and characterization of different types of nanocrystalline and sub-microcrystalline materials for functional applications. Different kinds of coatings and energy absorbing materials typically produced by electroplating, thermal spray techniques, and mechanical alloying are studied and optimized with respect to phase formation and distribution, texture, thermal stability, adhesion, etc. However, also superalloys, titanium and advanced steels are investigated with the aim to understand the materials characteristic and to achieve robust and predictable manufacturing processes, lower energy and materials consumption, and reduced environmental impact.

== Awards and recognition ==
- Best poster award at WomenInNano European Workshop
- Visiting professor/mentor of the International Science Center– Maria Sibylla Merian Programm, 4 weeks, University in Essen- Duisburg, Germany
- Research visit, 4 weeks, Risø National Laboratory, Denmark
- Board member of Chalmers Ventures AB
- Member of different international advisory boards of conferences
- Gender equality representative at Materials and Manufacturing Technology division
- Member of scientific council of Production Technology West at University West
- Doktorandenpreis der Hoechst AG
