= Roland Clement =

American environmentalist

Roland Charles Clement (November 22, 1912 – March 21, 2015) was an American environmentalist who worked for two decades at the National Audubon Society where he served many roles including staff biologist, staff ecologist, and Vice President. He was also a key figure in helping to ban DDT.

== Early life and education ==
Roland C. Clement was born in 1912 in Fall River, Massachusetts, the oldest child of Germain A. (a musician) and Angelina (DesJardins) Clement. He attended a two-year business college from 1928-1930 and worked as a bookkeeper for twelve years. In 1934, during the Great Depression, he was able to pursue his interest in ornithology when he began banding birds with Maurice Broun at the O.L. Austin Ornithological Research Station on outer Cape Cod. In 1938, Clement returned to school. He attended a two-year vocational program in Wildlife Management at the University of Massachusetts, Amherst, graduating in 1940.

In 1943, he enlisted in the Air Force where he worked as a weather observer from 1943 to 1946. He trained in Illinois, Louisiana, and Colorado. After training he was assigned to the Goosebay Station in Labrador where he remained from September, 1943 to August, 1944. After being promoted to Technical Sergeant, he was asked to take charge of weather duties at the remote George River's Indian House Lake in the interior of Labrador. While at Indian House Lake, he extensively studied birds and small mammals and later published two life histories based on these studies. He later returned to Labrador to spend six weeks for more detailed studies in 1957 and in 1958.

After the war, Clement matriculated at Brown University where he majored in botany and minored in geology graduating in 1949. He then pursued graduate study in wildlife conservation at Cornell University graduating with a MS in Wildlife Conservation in 1950.

== Career ==
Clement served as the executive director of the Audubon Society of Rhode Island from 1950 to 1958. During that time he also taught at Brown University as well as at the Rhode Island College of Education. He then joined the National Audubon Society, headquartered in New York City, where he would work from 1958 to 1977. During his time at the Audubon as membership secretary from 1958 to 1962, but quickly advanced to staff biologist from 1962 to 1967, and finally Vice President of the National Audubon Society from 1967 to 1977. He was known for his work in developing sanctuaries and protecting endangered species including whooping crane, peregrine falcons, bald eagle, and the California Condor. However, he may best be remembered for his work on banning DDT and publicly supporting and advocating the work of Rachel Carson. The publication of Silent Spring elicited strong responses, both positive and negative. He was a vocal advocate for Carson, debating with her detractors like Robert White-Stevens. On June 6, 1963, Clement testified with Carson before the Senate Committee on Commerce. They were submitting testimony regarding a bill, introduced by Senator Maurine Neuberger of Oregon, that would require states to be informed of federal spraying and to increase warnings of the hazardous effects of pesticides on wildlife.
