= Martina Klement =

German politician (born 1980)

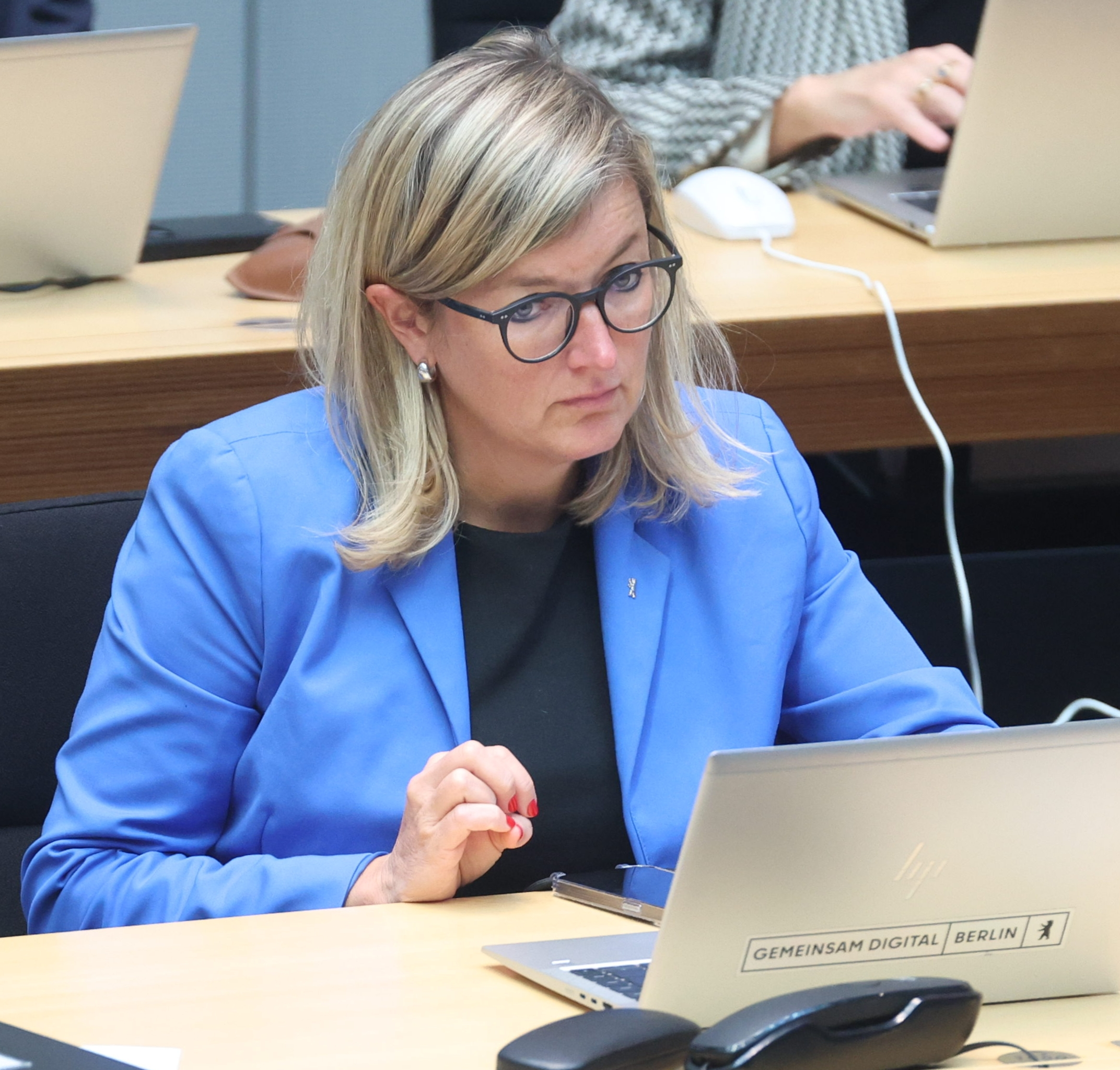
- Klement in 2024

Minister of Economic Affairs, Energy, Climate Protection and European Affairs of Brandenburg
- Incumbent
- Assumed office 18 March 2026
- Minister-President: Dietmar Woidke

Personal details
- Born: 22 June 1980 (age 45)
- Party: Christian Social Union (since 2014)

Martina Klement (born 22 June 1980) is a German politician serving as minister of economic affairs of Brandenburg since 2026. From 2023 to 2026, she served as state secretary for digitalization and administrative modernization of Berlin.

Born and raised in Swabia, Klement graduated from a high school in Franklin, Virginia, and obtained a law degree from LMU Munich in 2004. After completing her practical legal training in 2006, she joined the public administration in Bavaria, and in 2012 moved to Berlin as an aide to parlamentarian Stefan Müller.
