= Green Hill Commonwealth War Graves Commission Cemetery =

CWGC cemetery in Gallipoli, Turkey

Green Hill Cemetery
- Commonwealth War Graves Commission
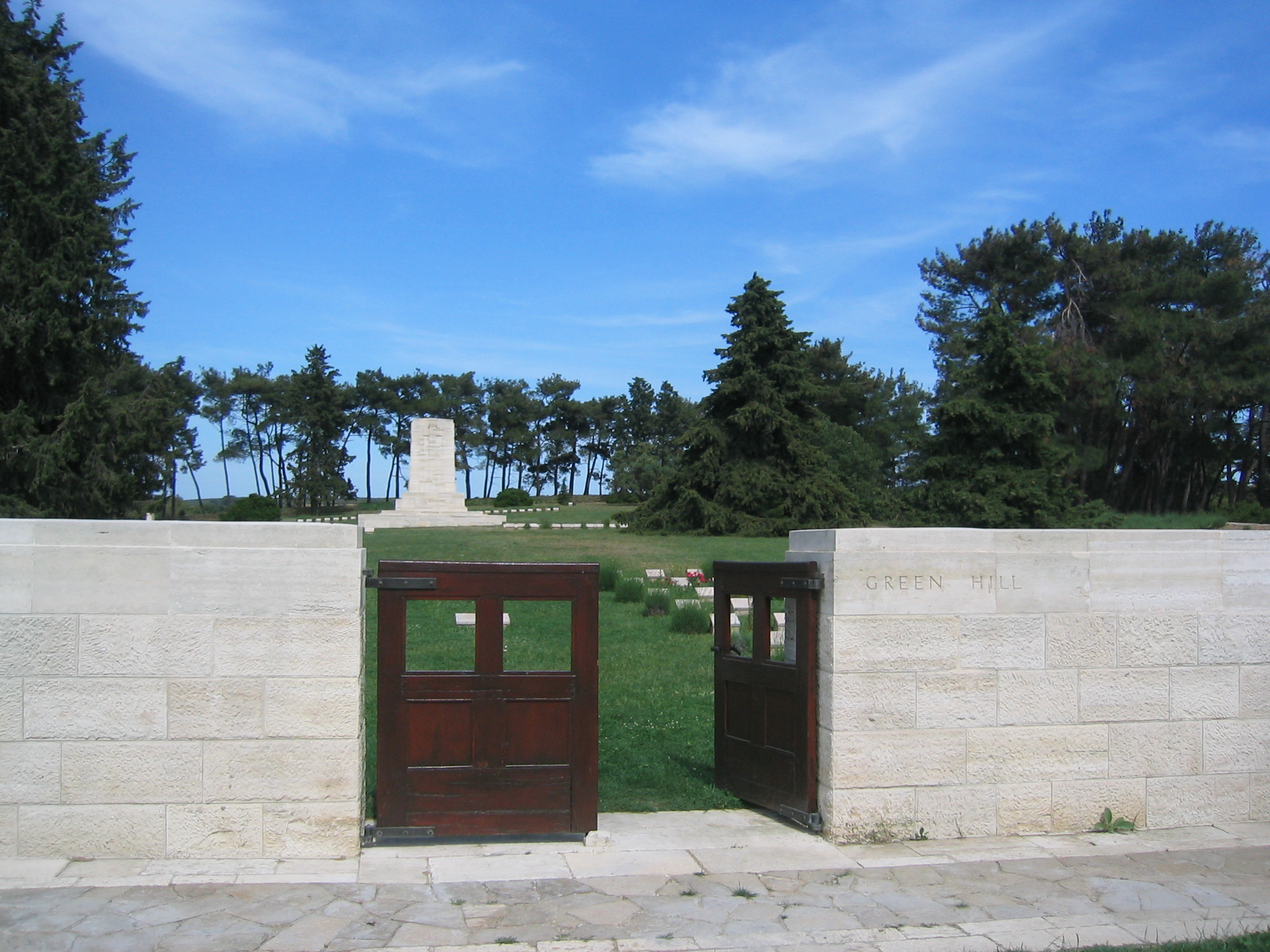
- Used for those deceased August–December 1915
- Established: 1919
- Location: 40.293°N 26.280°E
- Total burials: 2,971, of which 2,472 are unnamed

Burials by nation
- Allied Powers

Burials by war
- World War I: 2,971

Green Hill Cemetery is a Commonwealth War Graves Commission cemetery located near Suvla Bay, Gallipoli, Turkey.

== History ==
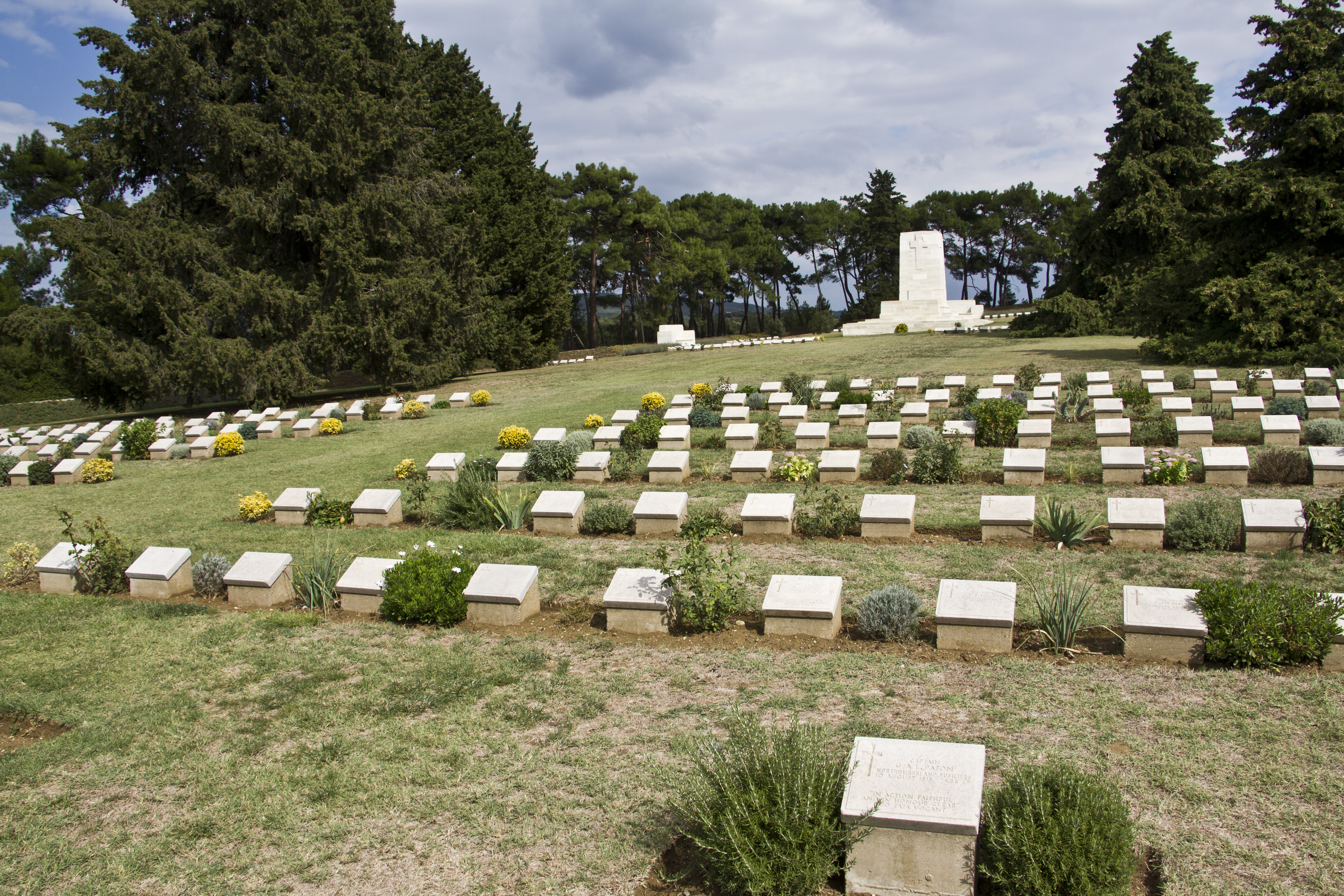
Green Hill Commonwealth War Graves Commission Cemetery

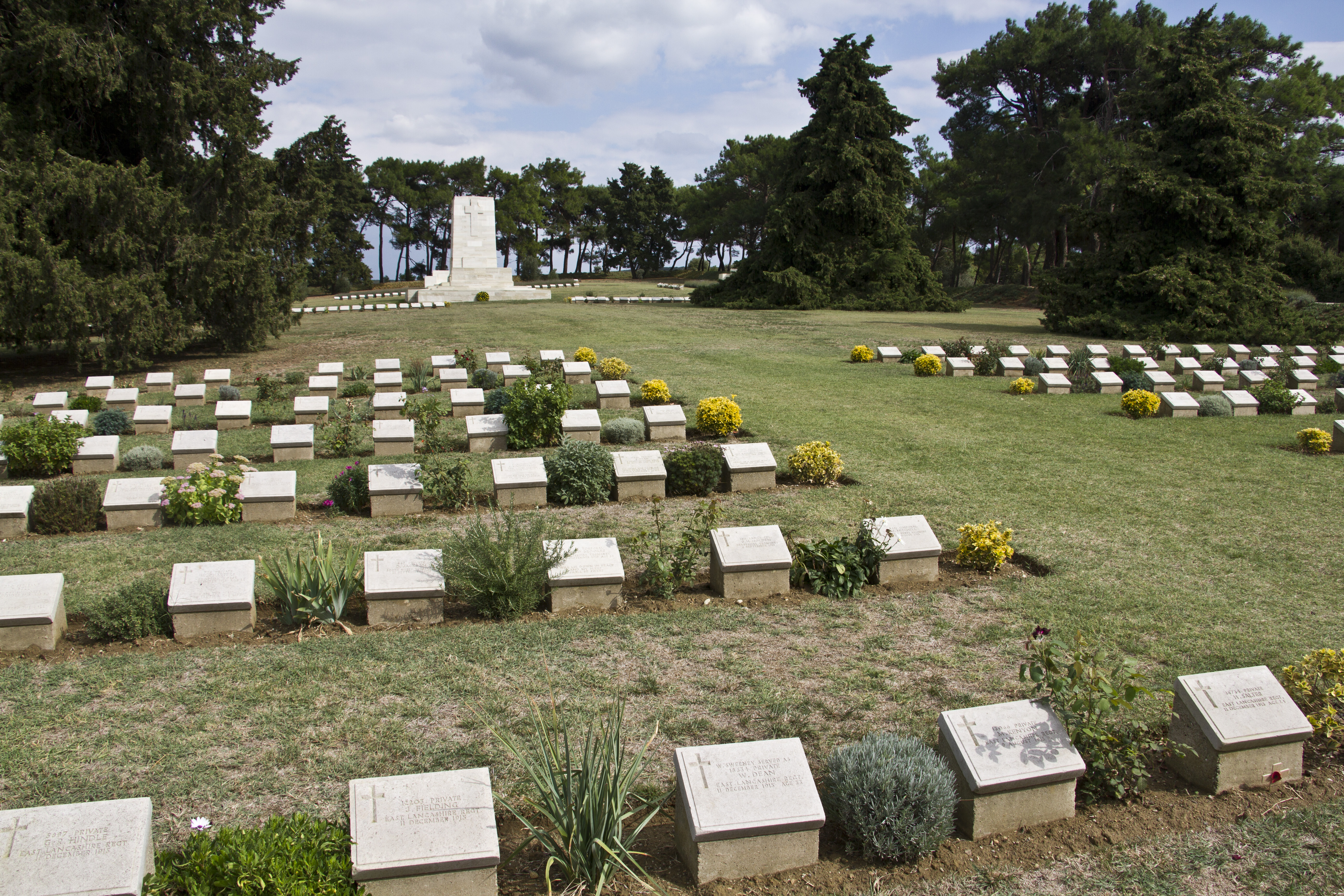
Green Hill Commonwealth War Graves Commission Cemetery

Green Hill and Chocolate Hill were names given by Allied troops taking part in the landing at Suvla Bay in August 1915 to parts of a hill called in Turkish Yilghin Burnu and which rises 52 metres above sea level from the eastern shore of the salt lake. The hill was captured the day after the landing, on 7 August 1915, but remained on the front line until the Allied withdrawal from the area in late December.

The cemetery was built on the hill after the Armistice when graves from the battlefield and small burial grounds nearby were consolidated into it.
