= Aeron Clement =

Welsh novelist

Aeron Clement (1936–1989) was a Welsh author. He is most known for having written The Cold Moons, a Watership Down-style story about badgers.

== Biography ==
Aeron Clement was born in Swansea in 1936, and later lived in Llandeilo in Carmarthenshire with his wife Jill and their two daughters. He worked as an accountant and as the director of an engineering company. He was also was a keen breeder of Great Danes and has achieved success at Crufts.

Clement began writing after a series of heart attacks made him retire from his regular job. His novel The Cold Moons was first published in 1987 by Kindredson Publishing, and was later reprinted by larger publishers such as Penguin Books. The cover illustrations for this book were drawn by Clement's wife Jill. The novel also got a Dutch translation by Parma van Loon in 1988.

Clement died in 1989 at the age of 53, due to complications from a heart operation.

== Books ==
- The Cold Moons (1987)
