= Clemens =

Clemens is a Late Latin, German, and Dutch masculine given name and a surname, meaning "merciful".

Notable people with the name include:

== Given name ==
- Clemens (rapper), (born 1979), real name Clemens Legolas Telling, Danish rapper, singer, music writer, actor
- Clemens (impostor) (died c. 15 AD), ancient Roman
- Clemens Alexandrinus (Clement of Alexandria, c. 150–c. 215), Christian theologian
- Clemens Arnold (born 1978), German field hockey player
- Clemens Baeumker (1853–1924), German historian of philosophy
- Clemens Bollen (born 1948), German politician
- Clemens Brentano (1778–1842), German poet and novelist
- Clemens Denhardt (1852–1929), German explorer of Africa
- Clemens Fritz (born 1980), German footballer
- Clemens Maria Hofbauer (1751–1820), patron saint of Vienna
- Clemens Holzmeister (1886–1983), Austrian architect
- Clemens Kalischer (1921–2018), German-American photographer
- Clemens von Ketteler (1853–1900), German diplomat
- Clemens Klotz (1886–1969), German architect
- Clemens Krauss (1893–1954), Austrian conductor
- Clemens Rehbein (born 1992), German musician
- Clemens Rostock (born 1984), German politician
- Clemens August Graf von Galen (1878–1946), German count, Bishop of Münster, and Cardinal of the Roman Catholic Church
- Clemens von Pirquet (1874–1929), Austrian scientist and pediatrician
- Clemens Wenceslaus of Saxony (1739–1812), Saxon prince, Archbishop-Elector of Trier, Prince-Bishop of Freising, Prince-Bishop of Regensburg and Prince-Bishop of Augsburg
- Clemens Westerhof (born 1940), Dutch football manager
- Clemens Wilmenrod (1906–1967), German television cook
- Clemens Winkler (1838–1904), German chemist

== Surname ==
- Adelaide Clemens (born 1989), Australian actress
- Andrew Clemens (1857–1894), American folk artist
- Aurelius Prudentius Clemens, 4th century Roman poet
- Avery Jae Clemens, Australian model and social media influencer
- Barry Clemens (1943–2026), American basketball player
- Bert A. Clemens (1874–1935), American politician
- Brian Clemens (1931–2015), British screenwriter and television producer
- Clayton Clemens, American Professor of Government
- Christopher Clemens, American astronomer
- Conrad Clemens (born 1983), German politician
- Dan Clemens (1945–2019), American politician
- Gabriel Clemens (born 1983), German darts player
- George T. Clemens (1902–1992), American cinematographer
- Harold W. Clemens (1918–1998), American politician
- C. Herbert Clemens (born 1939), American mathematician
- Isaac Clemens (1815–1880), Canadian farmer and politician
- Jacob Clemens non Papa (c. 1510 to 1515–1555 or 1556), Franco-Flemish composer of the Renaissance
- James Clemens (disambiguation), multiple people
- Jean Clemens (1880–1909), youngest daughter of Samuel Langhorne Clemens (Mark Twain)
- Jeremiah Clemens (1814–1865), U.S. senator and novelist
- Joachim Clemens (1931–2018), German politician
- Josef Clemens (born 1947), German bishop
- Joseph Clemens (1862–1936), American missionary and plant collector
- Joseph Clemens of Bavaria (1671–1723), German archbishop
- Kellen Clemens (born 1983), American football player
- Koby Clemens (born 1986), American baseball player
- Kody Clemens (born 1996), American baseball player
- Marcus Arrecinus Clemens (disambiguation), multiple people
- Martin Clemens, British World War II soldier and Solomon Islands coastwatcher
- Mary Strong Clemens (1873–1968), American botanist and plant collector
- Mazie E. Clemens (1890s–1952), American journalist and WWI war correspondent
- Olivia Langdon Clemens (1845–1904), wife of Samuel Langhorne Clemens (Mark Twain)
- Orion Clemens (1825–1897), brother of Samuel Langhorne Clemens (Mark Twain)
- Paul Clemens (born 1988), American baseball player
- Pierre Clemens (born 1970) Belgian visual artist
- Roger Clemens (born 1962), American baseball player
- Roman Clemens (1910–1992), German stage designer
- Mark Twain, pen name of Samuel Langhorne Clemens (1835–1910), American author
- Sherrard Clemens (1820–1881), American politician and lawyer
- Titus Flavius Clemens (consul), great-nephew of the Roman Emperor Vespasian and (as Flavius Clemens) a saint in the Greek Orthodox Church
- William Clemens (film director) (1905–1980), American film director

== Fictional characters ==
- Dr. Jonathan Clemens, a character in the 1992 film Alien 3 played by the British Actor Charles Dance
- Clemens, a slave in the Cambridge Latin Course

== See also ==
- Mount Clemens, Michigan, American city
  - Mount Clemens High School
- Munsinger Gardens and Clemens Gardens, gardens in St. Cloud, Minnesota, USA
- Clemens Automobile Company Building, listed on the National Register of Historic Places in Polk County, Iowa
- Clemens Church, Swedish church building
- Clemens Markets, former supermarket chain in Pennsylvania, USA
- Clemons (surname)
- Clemons (disambiguation)
- Clemmons (disambiguation)
- Clement (name), the English form of the name
- Clemente, the Italian, Portuguese, and Spanish form of the name
- Kliment (disambiguation), a Slavic form of the name
- Klemen, another Slavic form of the name
- Klemens (given name), another German form of the name
