= 1775 Liverpool seamen's revolt =

The 1775 Liverpool Seamen's revolt was a revolt by seamen faced by a cut in wages and consisted of industrial sabotage actions, protests and prison escapes. At the height of the struggle, the seamen bombarded Liverpool Town Hall.

== Economic crisis ==
At the time a large number of the working class in Liverpool were seamen and enjoyed the support of much of the general population. In August 1775, the American War of Independence had a big impact on the economy of Liverpool, particularly the transatlantic slave trade. In 1773 105 ships had sailed for Africa with a burthen tonnage of 11,056. By 1775 this had reduced to 81 ships with a total tonnage of 9,200. There were 3,000 unemployed seamen in Liverpool and about 40 ships fitted out for the transport of slaves were laid up.

Merchants decided to reduce the standard pay for rigging out a ship in preparation for a voyage, which was 30 shillings a month. Seamen who had been engaged to rig the Derby found that they were to be paid at only 20 shillings a month, and were told that there were plenty of sailors to be had in the port.

The seamen returned to the ship, cut down the rigging and left it lying on deck. The rest of the rigged ships in the harbour were treated in the same way. When nine of the men were arrested and committed to prison by the magistrates, two or three thousand seamen surrounded the prison and secured the release of eight of the men. They marched away, discovered that they had left one prisoner behind, and marched back to the prison. Here they succeeded in releasing not only the other seaman, but also a woman who had been accused of aiding and abetting the rioters.

The crowd marched to the Town Hall - which was also the merchants' Exchange - with a red flag. They continued their peaceful meetings and marching and a delegation met Lord Mayor James Clemens on the fifth day. There was a report that the merchants agreed to pay the rates that were asked.

However, that afternoon the merchants hired a body of armed men at ten shillings a day, and posted some in the Town Hall to arrest the strike leaders. In the evening, they fired on the unarmed strikers who were surrounding the building. The dead were variously reported at two or seven, the wounded at ten or several.

The seamen went aboard ships collecting cannon, and then put them into position to bombard the Town Hall. They bedecked their hats with red ribbons, raised the red flag, and at 1 p.m. the next day, they began bombarding the Town Hall. Four people were killed.

The merchants sent a message to the military in Manchester and two days later 100 cavalry with six officers set off for Liverpool. The seamen were attending the funeral of the victims of the shooting. The troops hunted down and arrested forty to sixty sailors and marched them off to Lancaster for indictment and trial.

Only twelve of the sailors were indicted at Lancaster. Eight were found guilty, but all were discharged on agreeing to enlist in the Navy.
