= Clemmons =

Clemmons may refer to

- Clemmons, North Carolina, a village in the United States
- W.C. Clemmons Mound, a Native American mound in Ohio, United States
- Clemmons Educational State Forest in North Carolina, United States
- Clemmons (surname)

== See also ==
- Clemons (disambiguation)
- Clemens (disambiguation)
