= Clemmons (surname) =

Clemmons is a surname. It may refer to one of the following people:

- Abel Clemmons (1772–1806), American murderer
- Alan D. Clemmons (born 1958), American lawyer and politician
- Beth Clemmons, a fictional character from the CBS crime drama Criminal Minds
- David Judson Clemmons, American guitarist, singer, and songwriter
- François Clemmons (born 1945), American singer, actor, playwright, and university lecturer
- Jessica Clemmons (born 1981), American singer-songwriter
- John Ray Clemmons (born 1977), American member of the Tennessee House of Representatives
- Joseph Clemmons (born 1929), American politician
- Larry Clemmons (1906–1988), American animator, screenwriter, and voice actor
- Maurice Clemmons (1972–2009), American responsible for the November 29, 2009, murder of four police officers in Parkland, Washington
- Sarah Clemmons, American college administrator

== See also ==
- Clemons (surname)
- Clemens
