= James Clemens =

James Clemens may refer to:

- James Clemens (lord mayor), English merchant and shipowner, Lord Mayor of Liverpool, 1775–76
- James Clemens, pen name of author James Paul Czajkowski (born 1961), who also uses the pen name James Rollins
- James Clemens Jr. (1791–1878), American businessman
- James Brackenridge Clemens (1825–1867), American entomologist
- James T. Clemens (born 1943), American theoretical physicist

== See also ==
- James and Sophia Clemens Farmstead, a farm in Darke County, Ohio
- James Clemens High School, a high school in Madison, Alabama
