= Clemons (surname) =

The surname Clemons is an Anglo-Saxon name that was originally derived from the given name Clement which means "the son of clement". The name has ancient origins in Latin and applies to a mild or merciful individual. Historically the surname was used by Saxons as they converted to Christianity.

== People ==
- Chris Clemons (born 1997), American basketball player
- Clarence Clemons (1942–2011), American musician, saxophonist for the E Street Band
- Darius Clemons, basketball player
- Darrius Clemons (born 2003), American football player
- Jack Clemons, NASA engineer
- Jane Clemons, U.S. Representative for New Hampshire
- John Clemons (1862–1944), Australian lawyer and politician
- Kiersey Clemons, American actress
- Kyle Clemons (born 1990), American track and field sprinter
- Micheal Clemons (born 1997), American football player
- Pinball Clemons (born 1965), American–Canadian player and executive in Canadian football
- Sam Clemons (born 1978), American football player
- Tameka A. Clemons, American biochemist

== See also ==
- List of Old English (Anglo-Saxon) surnames
- Clemens (disambiguation)
- Clemons (disambiguation)
- Clemmons (disambiguation)
