= Clemens Church =

Discovered church in Sweden

Clemens Church (S:t Stefans kyrka) is a church that was rediscovered after archaeological surveys in Lund.

The church was of a type with standing palisade wall (tiles) on a base log (väggplankor på syll).

== Connection to King Sweyn Forkbeard ==
The Encomium Emmae Reginae suggests that, in an effort to spread Christianity throughout Scandinavia, the Danish King Sweyn Forkbeard constructed a Monastery in Lund and dedicated it to the holy trinity. The author of the Encomium Emmae Reginae, a Flemish monk, was likely unaware that no monasteries had as of yet been constructed in Scandinavia by the time of King Sweyn Forkbeard's death (3 February 1014). Thus, the Clemens Church of Lund could very well have been the “monastery” constructed on the orders of King Sweyn Forkbeard. If so, the Clemens Church at Lund serves as an important landmark from the Christianization of Scandinavia.

== Notes ==
- Bolton, Timothy (2009). The Empire of Cnut the Great: Conquest and Consolidation of Power in Northern Europe in the Early Eleventh Century. Leiden, Netherlands: Brill. ISBN 978-9004166707.
