= Clemens Automobile Company Building =

- U.S. National Register of Historic Places
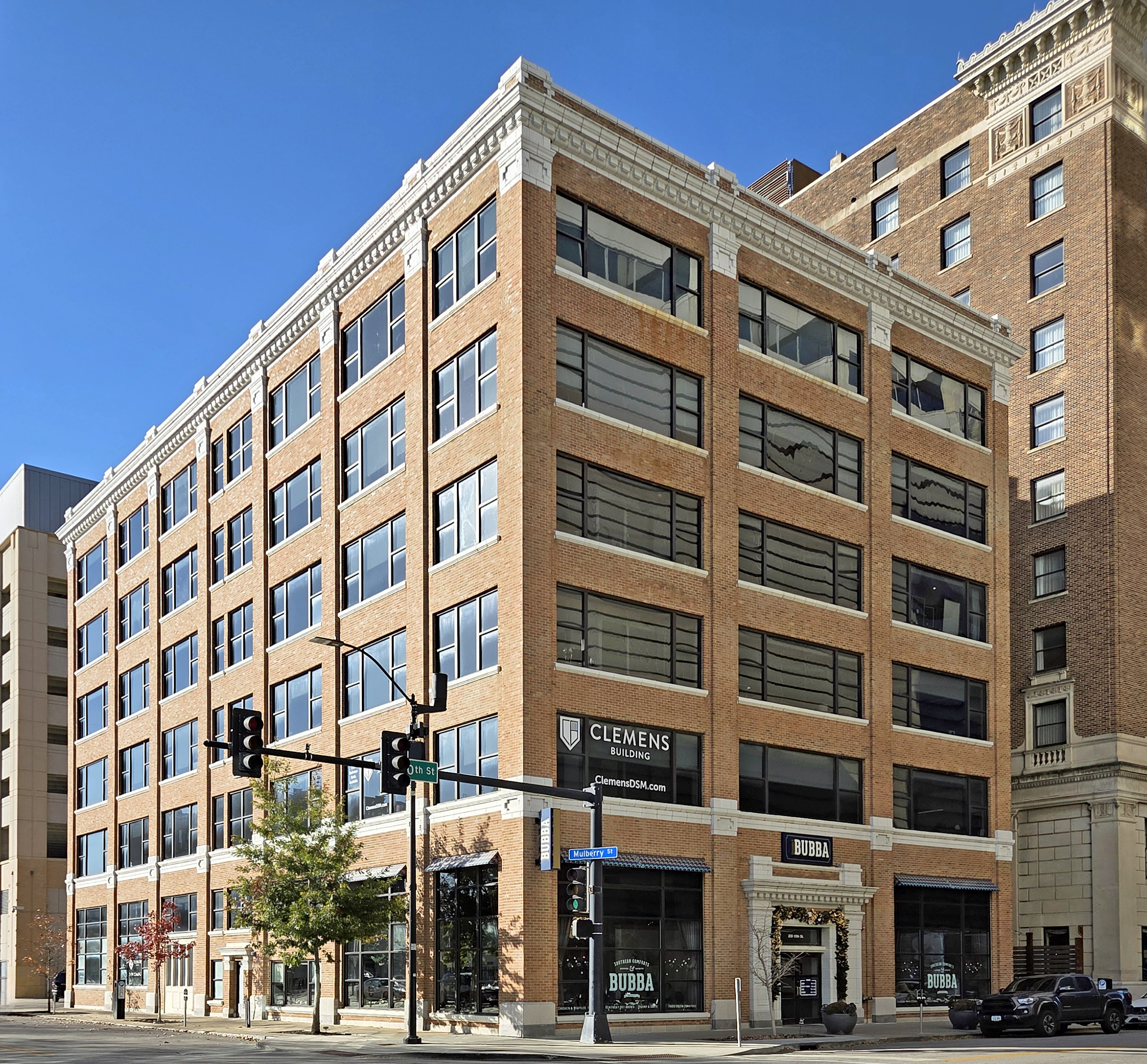
- The Clemens Automobile Company Building from the east

- Location within Iowa Location within the United States
- Location: 200 10th Street; Des Moines, Iowa
- Coordinates: 41°35′2.5″N 93°37′46.5″W
- Area: less than one acre
- Built: 1916
- Built by: J.E. Lovejoy
- Architectural style: Neoclassical, Chicago School
- NRHP reference No.: 09000272
- Added to NRHP: May 9, 2009

The Clemens Automobile Company Building is a historic building located in downtown Des Moines, Iowa, United States. It was completed in 1916 as an "automotive department store" operated by the Clemens Automobile Company. They sold cars here that were produced by Willys-Overland Motors from 1916 to 1923. There was a claim that this was the largest building in the city that was devoted to automobiles. The first floor was used for the main sales room and offices, the second floor was used for used car sales and the service department, the fourth floor was used for a paint department, and the remaining three floors and the basement were used for storage. The Clemens family was involved in a variety of business enterprises and another one of their companies, the Standard Glass and Paint Company, was housed here from 1924 to 1979. The building was part of the Hotel Fort Des Moines until 2016—the two buildings were linked across the alley in 1985. The first and second floors housed Raccoon River Brewing Co. from May 1997 to March 2015. The building underwent a renovation in 2015 when it was converted to 44 apartments. At that time, the connection to the Hotel Fort Des Moines was sealed off. The first floor has been home to southern restaurant Bubba since July 2016.

The building is a six-story brick structure with a reinforced concrete skeleton that rises 95 feet (29 m) above the ground. It is thought that the Des Moines architectural firm of Sawyer & Watrous designed the Neoclassical-style building, but that cannot be confirmed. Local contractor J.E. Lovejoy was in charge of construction. It was listed on the National Register of Historic Places in 2009.
