= Pierre Clemens (artist) =

Belgian visual artist (born 1970)

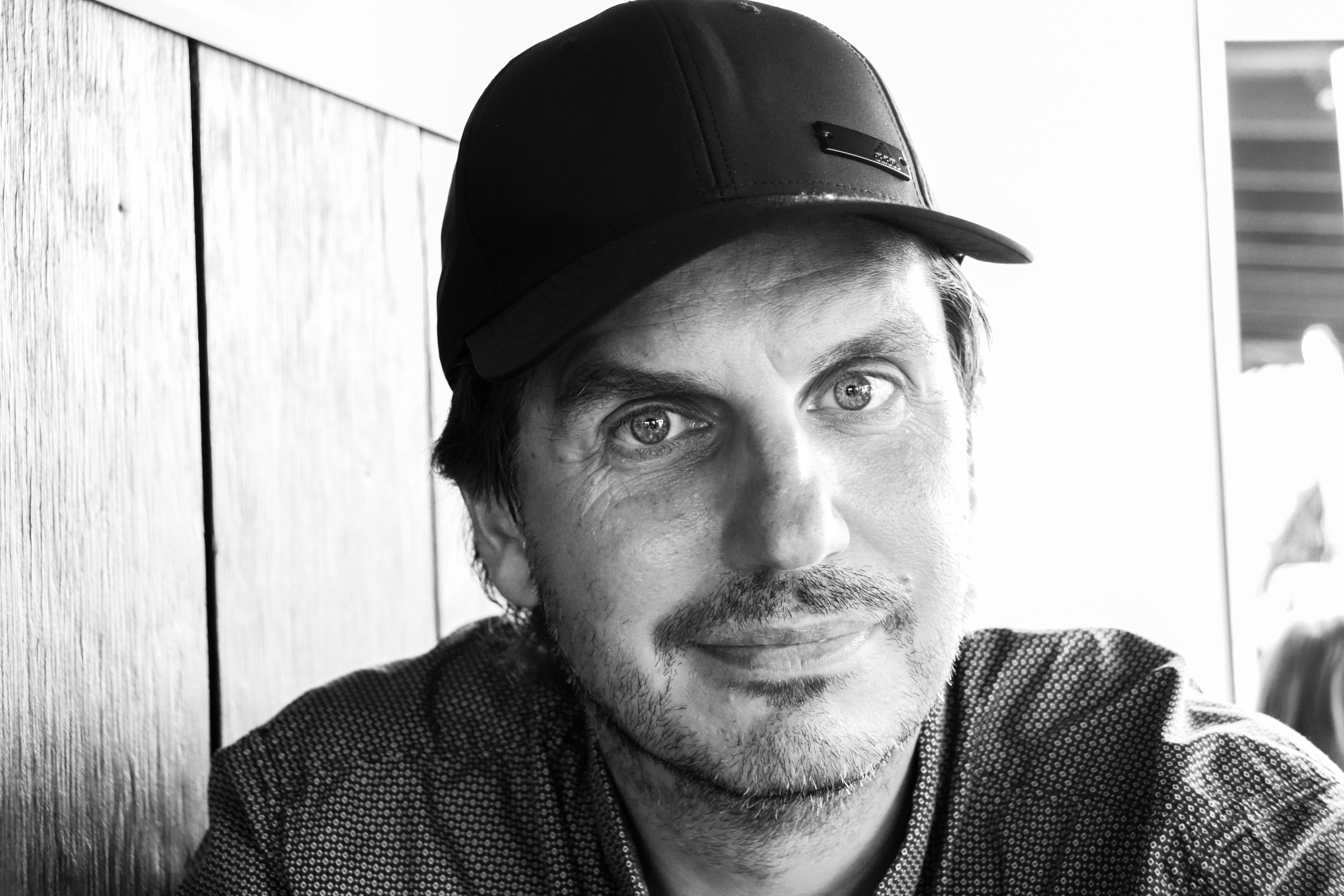
- Pierre Clemens (Fyn Island, Denmark 2018)
- Born: 6 July 1970 (age 56); Brussels, Belgium
- Education: Brussels Academy of Fine Arts, School of Fine Arts in Athens

Pierre Clemens, born in Brussels on 6 July 1970, is a Belgian visual artist and composer.

== Biography ==
Having chosen an artistic path at an early age, Pierre Clemens began drawing in his teens before studying at the Brussels Academy of Fine Arts (Drawing studio 1992–1996). Parallel to his training, he became interested in video and produced a series of works in this medium.

In 1995, during an Erasmus stay at the School of Fine Arts in Athens, Greece, he came across a series of architectural plans dating from the 1950s-1960s that were being thrown away. For him, they became a source of intense research in the form of a palimpsest linked to the theme of landscape as an object of thought and a vector for experimentation. This ongoing research has been summarized in a book that covers 25 years of artistic disciplines.

== Exhibitions ==
His first solo exhibition took place in Brussels in 1996 (Maison de l'art actuel des Chartreux - MAAC), followed by other exhibitions in Belgium and abroad : Center Georges Pompidou, Paris France 1994, Créer d'après la ville; Free Space, NICC, Antwerp Belgium 1999; Galerie B-312, Montreal Canada 2000; Videoformes 2009, Clermond-Ferrand, France; Last day of magic, Venice Biennale Official Off, Italy, 2009; Aperture, GNF Gallery, Brussels, Belgium 2019; etc.

Alongside his artistic activities, he was an assistant at La Cambre ENSAV in live model drawing from 2005 to 2011.

In 2000, he was awarded the International Art Price by the City of Tournai, Belgium.

== Unsculpted serie ==
In 2023, Pierre Clemens introduced a major new series in his work, entitled "Unsculpted." This body of work marks a shift toward virtual sculpture or imaginary photographic sculpture, moving the creative process from physical materiality to digital immateriality.

Conceptual and Technical Process

The "Unsculpted" project is based on an approach that the artist describes as a dematerialized poetic gesture. Rather than following the traditional cycle of sculpture (design, physical realization, then photographic documentation), Clemens chose to bypass the physical object stage.

Subjects and personal narrative: For his sculpture subjects, the artist draws on autobiographical elements, pushing for a personal narrative that unfolds through virtual forms. These subjects include family stories and political concerns, giving the series both an intimate and societal dimension.

Bypassing contingencies: The artist starts from the observation that knowledge of major sculptural works is mainly gained through their photographic reproduction. He uses this fact as a premise to bypass the logistical constraints (materials, studio, assistants) of traditional sculptural creation.

Digital creation: Clemens uses the 3D digital tools he has mastered to shape forms and volumes that exist only in the two-dimensional space of the image. The work, in its initial intention, is a sculpture that is "completed" and "materialized" solely in the form of a photograph. The virtual sculpture is therefore not simply a representation of an existing work, but the work itself.

Formal Characteristics and Realization

The "Unsculpted" series has specific technical and aesthetic characteristics:

Duplication of the gesture: The work is characterized by a dual approach: purely virtual creation and a return to materiality through printing. The fundamentals of photographic practice, such as framing, composition, and the search for (simulated) light, are essential to the creation of digital forms and volumes.

Materialization through laser engraving: After virtual creation, the artist reintroduces a craft-based gesture. Pierre Clemens himself engraves the photographs of these virtual sculptures using a laser machine. This step transforms the digital file into a unique physical object.

Support and aesthetics: The engraved panels are made of Dibond, a rigid composite material. The use of this technique gives the work a texture and depth reminiscent of sculpture. The works are produced in black and white, accentuating the formal aspect of the volumes and the play of contrasts (shadows and light).

Reflection on originality: In the absence of a physical reference, the forms question the notion of originality and the substance of the work of art in the digital age, elevating photography, traditionally a medium of reproduction, to the rank of a sculptural object in its own right.

Positioning

The "Unsculpted" series positions Pierre Clemens at the intersection of conceptual art, art photography, and digital practices (New Media Art). The process combining creative dematerialization and physical materialization through laser engraving gives this series a duality that anchors the work in a contemporary questioning of perception and representation.

== Music ==
In addition to his visual art practice, he has been working for several years on composing electroacoustic music, and in 2008 released his first album[1] devoted to his sound experiments. Since then, he has regularly published albums and solo sound pieces on his Lisala label (Brussels)

In 2015, he took part in the Kinokophonography festival organized by The Whitworth Art Centre, University of Manchester, UK. In 2021 and 2022, his music is played during the Audio Rocket festival, organized by the Musicology Department of Osaka University of Arts, Japan.

== Editions / Catalogues ==
- Center Georges Pompidou "Créez d'après la Ville". Catalog. Introduction by François Barré, president of the center and René Barberye. Caisse d'Epargne Edition, Paris (p. 41) 1994. On the occasion of the thematic exhibition "The City - Art and Architecture in Europe 1870-1993".
- Améthystes de Thijl (n°2), drawing published in "Le Vide" about Henri Michaux, March 1996.
- Argus Magazine "Pierre Clemens, l'espèce d'espace" by Daniel Delville, Brussels, December, n°3, 2 pages. 1996.
- "De la matrice à la liberté" (p. 20 and 21). Full color, 36 pages. Brussels, 2000.
- Argos. Brussels. Information Days 2000. Catalog.
- TeleNICC catalog "1 minute project" p. 37. Center Bruxelles 2000 (Brussels, European City of Culture 2000)
- Cahier n°44, brochure published by galerie B-312 Montréal Canada, 2 pages, Introduction by Georges Meurant. June 2000.
- "129 Belgian artists" by Patricia Mathieu. Edition Belka Itinerance. 2016.
- "Pierre Clemens, Landscape in process, Some works 1995-2020" Lisala edition. 2021. 354 pages. Color.
- "_SCAPE Lexicon - 7.280 possible landscapes" by Pierre Clemens. Lisala edition. 2021. 100 pages. b&w.

== Articles ==
- Article by Claude Lorent in La Libre Belgique. About "Pierre Clemens" exhibition, Maison de l'Art Actuel. 1997.
- TV Brussels - 30 minutes d'Art contemporains, Interview, September 1999.
- Le Courrier de l'Escaut "Prix artistique de la Ville (Tournai)" by M.V. 2000.
- Nord Eclair (FR) Article "Prix 2000 de la Ville de Tournai" (Prix International Pierre Clemens).
- La Libre Belgique. "Prix 2000 de la Ville de Tournai" by Claude Lorent. 2000.
- Montreal Mirror "Little Landscape" by Sholem Krishtalka. About the exhibition at Galerie B-312, Montreal, 2000.
- GPOA, Interviewe by Françoise Mortier with Stephan Balleux, Yves Bernard, Pierre Clemens, Michel Cleempoel, Nicolas Maleve and Philippe Seynave. Edited by GPOA. 2001.
- La Libre Belgique. "Réel et virtuel au filtre de l'informatique" by Claude Lorent (12/10/2001) about the GPOA exhibition. 2001.
- Le Soir "Corps à cœur avec l'infini" by Dominique Legrand. About the GPOA exhibition (2001)
- Art Partners Center Anita Nardon "Le numérique" October 2001. About the exhibition at GPOA. 2001.
- TéléMoustique, Mosquito. "Le numérique: nouveau médium de l'art ?" by Sébastien Ministru (04/09/2001)
- Arts Antiques Auctions n°325 "Le numérique: nouveau médium de l'art, évolution, révolution ?" by W.T. 2001.
- L'éventail Magazine "Évolution ou révolution ? L'art numérique en question" by Christophe Dosogne. About the GPOA exhibition. P.60. 2001.
- Vers l'Avenir "Un clavier comme pinceau" by Olivier Deheneffe, about the Pierre Clemens exhibition at Galerie Détour, Namur, Belgium. 2004.
- Steps Magazine "Pierre Clemens" by Christine Pinchart, about the Pierre Clemens exhibition at Galerie Détour, Namur, Belgium. 2004.
- La Libre Belgique "Fléché" by Claude Lorent, about Pierre Clemens' solo exhibition at Galerie Détour, Namur, Belgium. 2004.
- Quote in La Libre Culture - Claude Lorent. About the Venice Biennale "L'humain en valeur recherchée" 2009.
- La Libre Belgique "Souffles contrastés, dérisoires et subtils" Article by Roger Pierre Turine. "Synapses" Galerie Nadine Feront, from 03/27 to 04/05/2014. P. 4 & 5 - Arts Libre - Supplement to La Libre Belgique N°224 - Week of March 21 to 27, 2014.
- EtherReal - Page focus on the sound work of Pierre Clemens. 1 page. 2014.
- MUinTheCity Magazine "Atelier d'artiste : Pierre Clemens" Photos by Patricia Mathieu. May 2015.

== Radio ==
- RTBF Radio La Première (Belgian Radio-Television) Interviewed by journalist Christine Pinchart for the radio magazine "Systoles" about Pierre Clemens' solo exhibition at Galerie Détour Namur, Belgium. January (14 min) 2004.
- RTBF Radio La Première (Belgian Radio-Television) Interviewed by Thierry Genicot in "Le monde invisible" about WalkingVoice TV project & Filip Francis exhibition (Black Box Gallery / Guy Ledune - Brussels)
