= Clemons =

Clemons may refer to:

- Clemons, Iowa, United States
- Clemons, Kentucky, United States
- Clemons, New York, United States
- Clemons (surname)
