= Marcus Arrecinus Clemens =

Marcus Arrecinus Clemens may refer to:

- Marcus Arrecinus Clemens (praetorian prefect under Caligula)
- Marcus Arrecinus Clemens (consul), son of the previous
