= Clemons, New York =

- Hamlet
- Location within New York Location within the United States
- Coordinates: 43°38′11″N 73°26′43″W
- Country: United States
- State: New York
- County: Washington
- Elevation: 377 ft (115 m)
- Time zone: UTC-5 (Eastern (EST))
  - Summer (DST): UTC-4 (EDT)
- ZIP code: 12819
- Area codes: 518 & 838
- GNIS feature ID: 946842

Clemons is a hamlet in Washington County, New York, United States. The community is located along New York State Route 22 6 miles (9.7 km) north-northwest of Whitehall. Clemons has a post office with ZIP code 12819, which opened on April 10, 1873.
