= James Clemens (lord mayor) =

Liverpool Lord Mayor, merchant and shipowner (fl. 1750–1775)

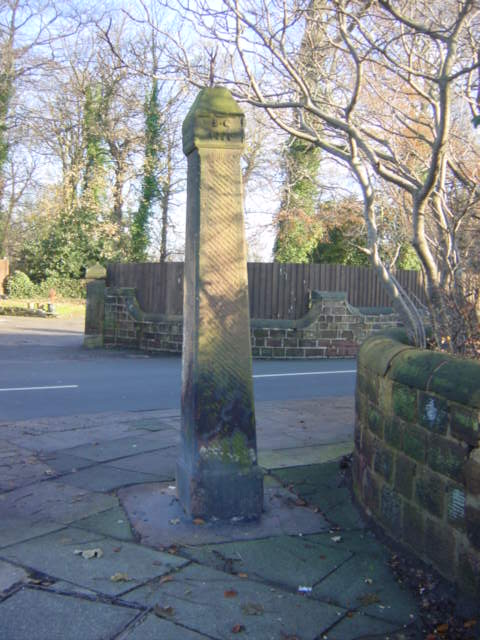
Sandstone signpost dated 1776, and inscribed with the initials of James Clemens. Situated at Thomas Lane and Thingwall Lane, the entrance to Clemen's house Ashfield (since burned down) can be seen behind the pillar.

James Clemens (fl. 1750–1775) was a Liverpool, England merchant and shipowner, and Lord Mayor of Liverpool.

== Life ==
Clemens made three voyages to Angola in the 1750s, in addition to other slave runs, in 1767, he sent the Ranger, under William Speers, to acquire slaves in Angola and transport them to Barbados. Also, in 1767, he became a member of the Liverpool town council, and was, from 1775 to 1776, the Lord Mayor. While serving as Lord Mayor, he presented St Pauls, Stoneycroft with a two cwt (104 kg) bell.
