= Gustave García =

Italian opera singer (1837–1925)

Gustave García (February 1, 1837 – June 12, 1925) was an Italian baritone opera singer and singing teacher.

== Biography ==
Gustave García was born on February 1, 1837, in Milan, Austrian Empire, the son of Manuel Patricio Rodríguez García (1805–1906) and the soprano Cécile Eugénie Mayer (1818–1880). He made his professional début as an operatic baritone in 1860 at Her Majesty's Theatre in London as Don Giovanni. He married and had a son, baritone Alberto García (1875–1946).

Best known in his second career, as a teacher, in 1880 he became a professor of singing at the Royal Academy of Music, where he worked till 1890. He also taught at the Guildhall School of Music from 1883 to 1910, and from 1884 at the Royal College of Music until his illness and final retirement. His pupils at the Royal College included Martyn Green and Walter Hyde. He died on June 12, 1925.

== Works ==
- The Actors' Art: a Practical Treatise on Stage Declamation, Public Speaking and Deportment. London: T. Pettitt & Co., 1882
- The Singing Teacher's Note Book, a Short Synopsis of Voice Production for Teachers of Singing and Examination Candidates. London: Boosey & Co., 1910.
- A guide to Solo Singing. Containing Full Instructions for Singing, with a Detailed Analysis of Some Well-Known Works and Songs. London: Stainer, Novello, Ewer & Co., 1914

== Students ==
- Béatrice La Palme

== Genealogy ==
- Manuel García (1775–1832), singer, composer, impresario; married Joaquina Sitches (1780–1864)
  - Manuel García Junior (1805–1906), singer, composer, singing teacher; married Cécile Maria "Eugénie" Mayer (1814–1880)
    - Manuel García (1836–1885)
    - Gustave García (1837–1925), baritone and singing teacher; married Emily Matilda Ann Martorell (1835–?)
      - Alberto García (1875–1946), baritone
    - Eugenie Harouel (1840–1924)
    - Marie Crèpet (1842–1867)
  - Maria Malibran (1808–1836), singer; married Francois Eugene Malibran (1781–1836) (no issue); married Charles Auguste de Bériot (1802–1870), composer, violinist
    - Charles-Wilfrid de Bériot (1833–1914), pianist, composer, professor at the École Niedermeyer
  - Pauline Viardot (1821–1910), singer, composer; married Louis Viardot (1800–1883)
    - Louise Héritte-Viardot (1841–1918), composer, pianist, singer
    - Claudie Viardot (1852–1914); married Georges Chamerot; had issue
    - Marianne Viardot (1854–1919), painter, briefly engaged to Gabriel Fauré; married Alphonse Duvernoy
    - Paul Viardot (1857–1941)
