= Manuel García (baritone) =

Spanish baritone and educator (1805–1906)

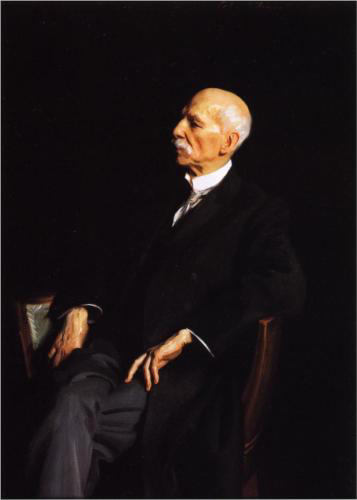
García, aged 100 by John Singer Sargent

Manuel Patricio Rodríguez García (17 March 1805 – 1 July 1906), was a Spanish singer, music educator, and vocal pedagogue. He invented the first laryngoscope.

== Biography ==
García was born on 17 March 1805 either in Madrid, as has been traditionally stated, or in the town of Zafra in the province of Badajoz, Spain. (Note: Nearly all sources (e.g. "Manuel García", Encyclopædia Britannica; Harold Rosenthal and John Warrack, The Concise Oxford Dictionary of Opera, London, Oxford University Press, 1964, ad nomen; Radomski 2005, p. 26) report Madrid as García's (likely) birthplace, but his pupil and biographer Malcolm Sterling Mackinlay wrote that "the place of his birth was not Madrid, as has been so often stated, but Zafra in Catalonia". In fact, however, the town of Zafra is in Extremadura, not in Catalonia.) His father was singer and teacher Manuel del Pópulo Vicente Rodriguez García (Manuel García I, 1775–1832). His sisters were Maria Malibran (1808–1836) and Pauline Viardot (1821–1910). After abandoning his onstage career as a baritone, García began to teach at the Paris Conservatory (1830–48) and the Royal Academy of Music, London (1848–95). Jessie Bond, Camille Everardi, Erminia Frezzolini, Julius Günther, Jenny Lind, Mathilde Marchesi, Christina Nilsson, Julia Ettie Crane, Georgina Schubert, Julius Stockhausen, Marie Tempest, Charles Santley and Henry Wood were among his pupils. He invented a laryngoscope in 1854 and the next year published observations of his own larynx and vocal cords made with a small dental mirror introduced into the throat and using sunlight reflected by another mirror. He has been credited with saving the career of Jenny Lind, who had suffered vocal damage from overwork in her early twenties. García was interested in movements connected with the production of the singing voice and did not anticipate the importance of laryngoscopy for medicine. Still, the University of Königsberg conferred upon him the honorary degree of Doctor of Medicine He died in London in 1906 at the age of 101 years and was buried in the churchyard of St. Edward's Catholic church in Sutton Green, Surrey. His grave gives details of his many famous pupils and accomplishments.

On 22 November 1832 in Paris García married the operatic soprano Cécile Eugénie Mayer (Paris, 8 April 1814 – Paris, 12 August 1880). They had two sons Manuel (1836–1885) Gustave (1837–1925) and two daughters, Eugenie Harouel (1840–1924) and Marie Crèpet (1842–1867). His second son Gustave García (1 February 1837 – 1925) was a singer, actor, and author of three books on vocal and stage techniques. Gustave's son, Albert García (1875–1946), studied voice with his great-aunt (Pauline Viardot), became a respected baritone, and produced an edition of his grandfather's treatise on singing (1924).

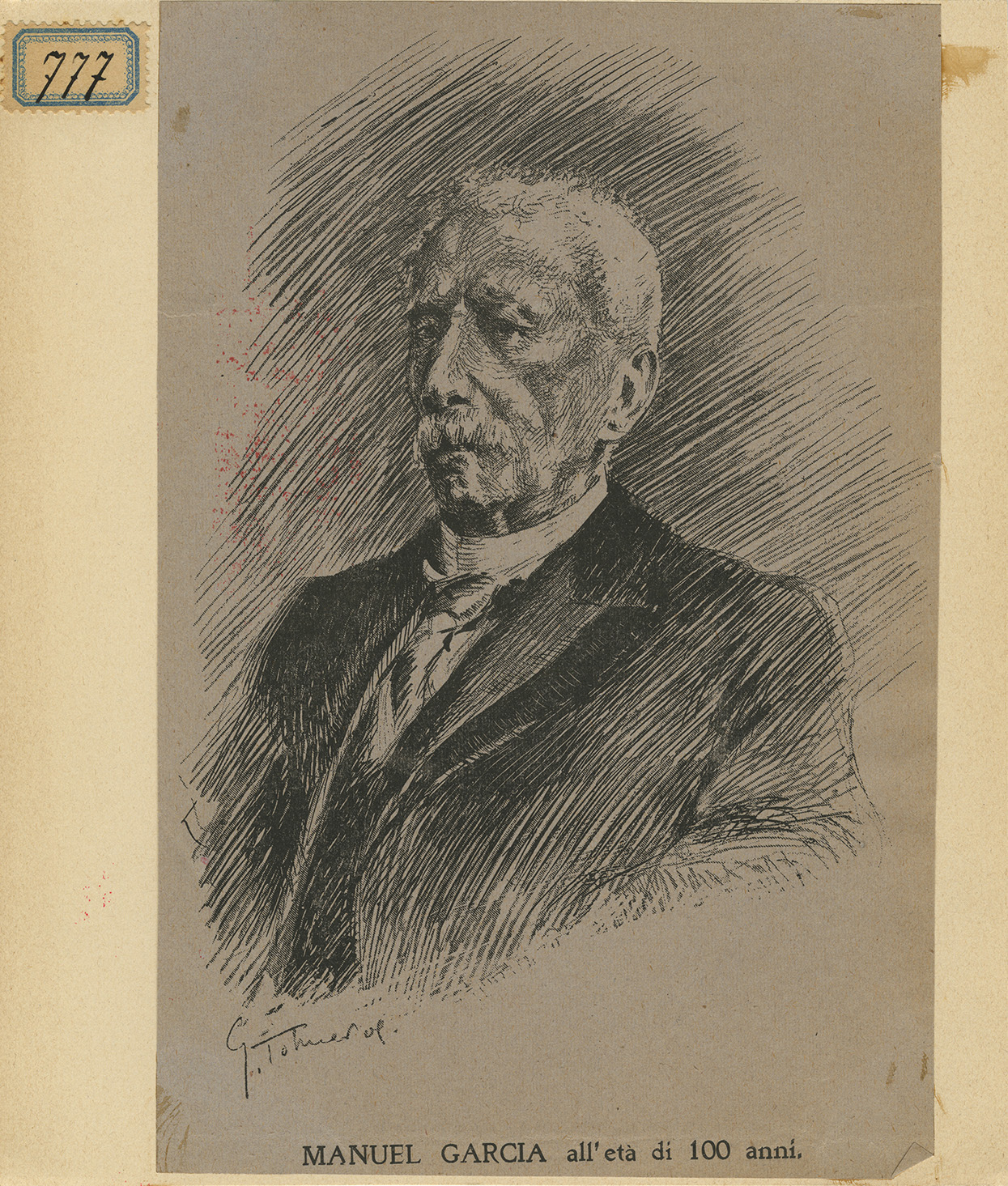
Portrait of Manuel García, 1905

== Works ==
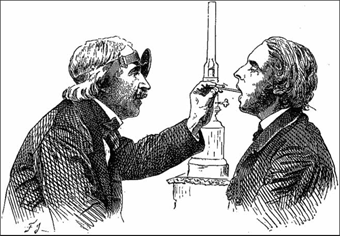
The laryngoscopy. From García, 1884

- Mémoire sur la voix humaine présenté à l'Académie des Sciences en 1840. Paris: Duverger, 1847.
- Ecole de García: traité complet de l'art du chant par Manuel García fils. Mayence, Paris: Schott 1840 (part 1), 1847 (part 2).
- Tratado completo del arte del canto – Escuela de García. Lucía Díaz Marroquín and Mario Villoria (eds.). Kassel: Reichenberger, 2012. ISBN 978-3-937734-91-0 (Annotated edition in Spanish).
- Garcías Schule oder Die Kunst des Gesanges in allen ihren Theilen vollst. abgehandelt von Manuel García. German text by C. Wirth. Mainz: Schott, 1841; also in two parts in the magazine Caecilia; part 1 in vol. 22 (1843), no. 85; part 2 in vol. 26 (1847), no. 104 (Digitalisat)
- Ecole de García: traité complet de l'art du chant. (Vols. 1 and 2). Mayence, Paris: Schott 1856.
- A complete treatise on the art of singing, part two by M. García II. Second part, complete and unabridged, the editions of 1847 and 1872 collated, ed. and transl. by Donald V. Paschke. Reprint of the 1872 edition. New York: Da Capo Press, 1975. ISBN 0-306-76212-9, 0-306-70660-1. Includes bibliographies.

== Genealogy ==
- Manuel García (1775–1832), singer, composer, impresario; married Joaquina Sitches (1780–1864)
  - Manuel García Junior (1805–1906), singer, composer, singing teacher; married Cécile Maria "Eugénie" Mayer (1814–1880)
    - Manuel García (1836–1885)
    - Gustave García (1837–1925), baritone and singing teacher; married Emily Matilda Ann Martorell (1835–?)
      - Alberto García (1875–1946), baritone
    - Eugenie Harouel (1840–1924)
    - Marie Crèpet (1842–1867)
  - Maria Malibran (1808–1836), singer; married Francois Eugene Malibran (1781–1836) (no issue); married Charles Auguste de Bériot (1802–1870), composer, violinist
    - Charles-Wilfrid de Bériot (1833–1914), pianist, composer, professor at the École Niedermeyer
  - Pauline Viardot (1821–1910), singer, composer; married Louis Viardot (1800–1883)
    - Louise Héritte-Viardot (1841–1918), composer, pianist, singer
    - Claudie Viardot (1852–1914); married Georges Chamerot; had issue
    - Marianne Viardot (1854–1919), painter, briefly engaged to Gabriel Fauré; married Alphonse Duvernoy
    - Paul Viardot (1857–1941)

== See also ==
- Pasqual Mario Marafioti
- Giovanni Battista Lamperti
