= Joaquina Sitches =

Spanish actress and opera singer (1780–1864)

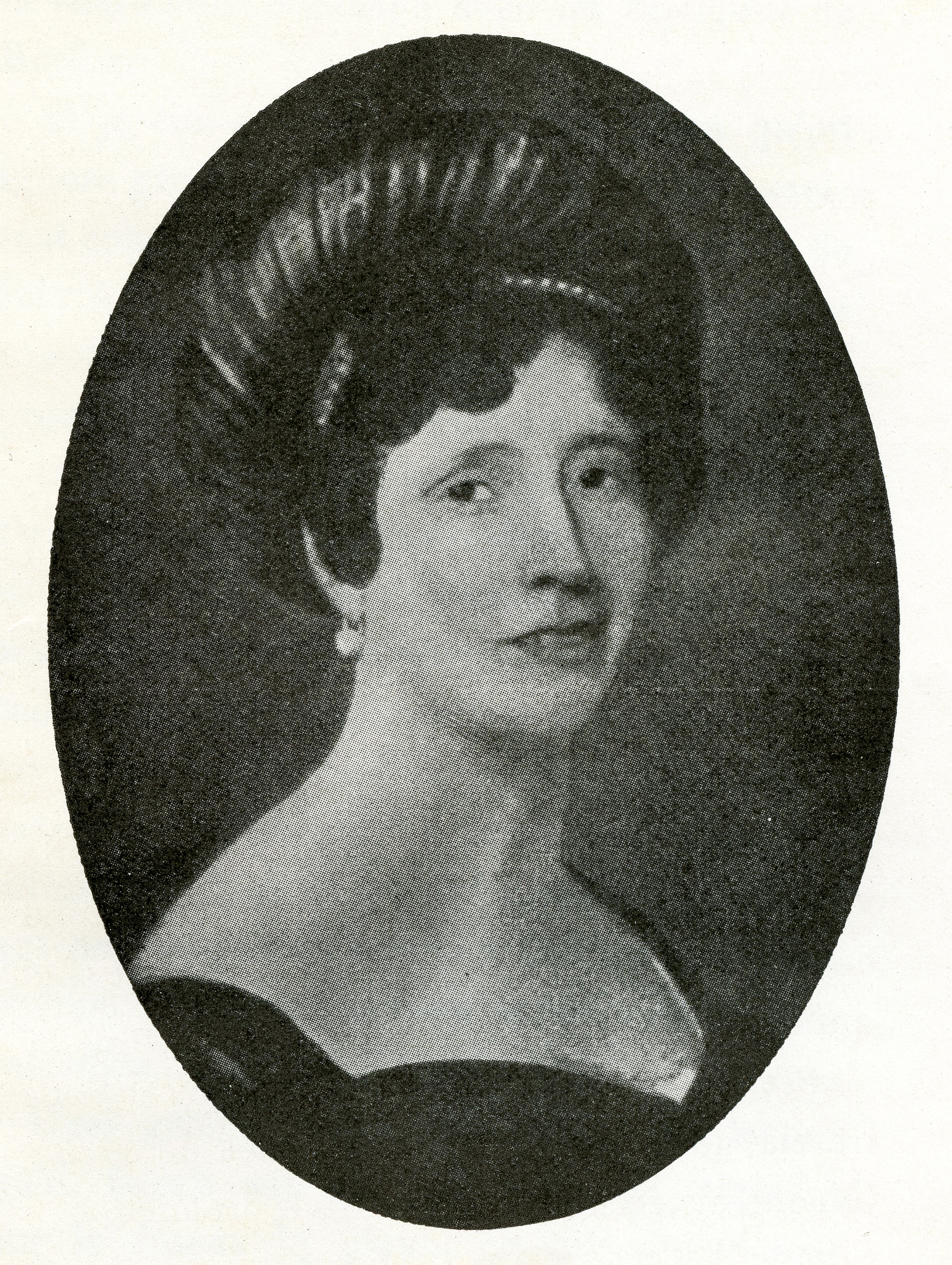
- Sitches circa 1810s
- Born: María Joaquina Sitches y Irisarri; 28 July 1780
- Died: 10 May 1864 (aged 83)
- Occupations: Actress and operatic soprano
- Spouse: Manuel García
- Children: Maria Malibran; Pauline Viardot; Manuel García

Joaquina Sitches (born María Joaquina Sitches y Irisarri; 28 July 1780 – 10 May 1864), also known under the stage name of Joaquina Briones or, after her marriage, of Joaquina García, was a Spanish actress and operatic soprano.

== Life ==
She was born as María Joaquina Sitches y Irisarri to Martín Sitches and Lorenza Irisarri. Joaquina Sitches was the second wife of the tenor, composer and impresario Manuel García, and the mother of the pedagogue Manuel García the younger, of the mezzo Maria Malibran, and of the mezzo and composer Pauline Viardot.

All three children were gifted and benefited from the early training by their father. On her husband's death, when Pauline was not yet 11 years old, Sitches took charge of her vocal training.

== Genealogy ==
- Manuel García (1775–1832), singer, composer, impresario; married Joaquina Sitches (1780–1864)
  - Manuel García Junior (1805–1906), singer, composer, singing teacher; married Cécile Maria "Eugénie" Mayer (1814–1880)
    - Manuel García (1836–1885)
    - Gustave García (1837–1925), baritone and singing teacher; married Emily Matilda Ann Martorell (1835–?)
      - Alberto García (1875–1946), baritone
    - Eugenie Harouel (1840–1924)
    - Marie Crèpet (1842–1867)
  - Maria Malibran (1808–1836), singer; married Francois Eugene Malibran (1781–1836) (no issue); married Charles Auguste de Bériot (1802–1870), composer, violinist
    - Charles-Wilfrid de Bériot (1833–1914), pianist, composer, professor at the École Niedermeyer
  - Pauline Viardot (1821–1910), singer, composer; married Louis Viardot (1800–1883)
    - Louise Héritte-Viardot (1841–1918), composer, pianist, singer
    - Claudie Viardot (1852–1914); married Georges Chamerot; had issue
    - Marianne Viardot (1854–1919), painter, briefly engaged to Gabriel Fauré; married Alphonse Duvernoy
    - Paul Viardot (1857–1941)
