= Bériot =

Bériot or de Bériot is a French surname which may refer to:

- Charles Auguste de Bériot (1802–1870), Belgian violinist, artist and composer
- Charles-Wilfrid de Bériot (1833–1914), French pianist, teacher and composer
- Olivier Bériot (born 1962), French costume designer
