= Louise Héritte-Viardot =

French singer, pianist, conductor and composer

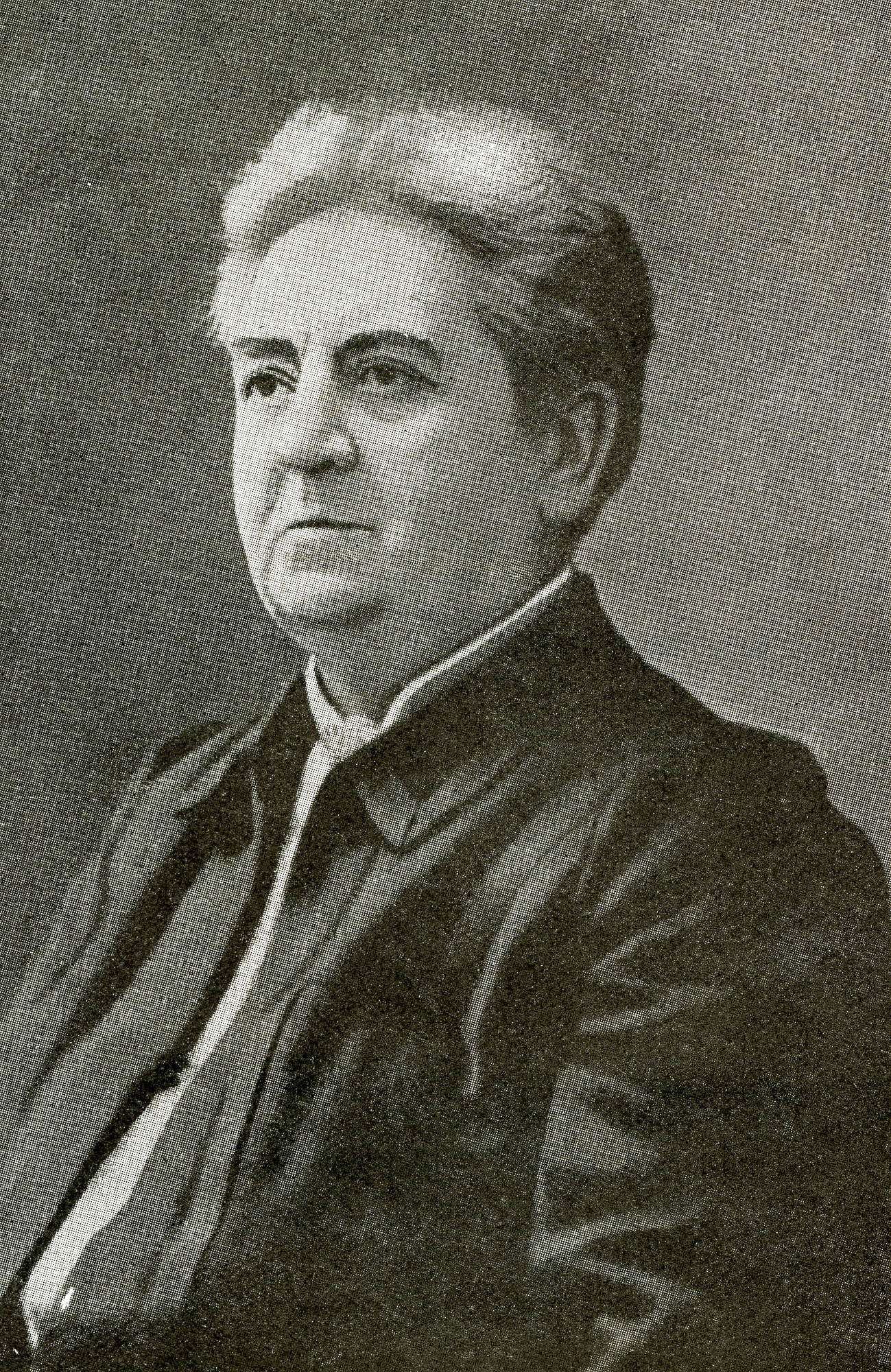

Louise Pauline Marie Héritte-Viardot (French: [lwiz eʁit vjaʁdo]; 14 December 1841 – 17 January 1918) was a French singer (contralto), pianist, conductor and composer. She was born in Paris, the eldest child of Pauline Viardot-Garcia and Louis Viardot, niece of Maria Malibran and sister to composer and conductor Paul Viardot.

In 1863 Viardot married Ernest Héritte, Honorary Consul and Chancellor of the Embassy of France in Bern. Her performing career was ended by illness, and with the help of Clara Schumann, she found a teaching position as a singing teacher at the Hoch Conservatory. She died in Heidelberg.

== Works ==
Héritte-Viardot composed mostly chamber music pieces and orchestral works and symphonies, many of which are lost. Selected works include:

- Arme kleine Liebe (in Drei Lieder) (Text: Anna Ritter)
- Der Schmied, op. 8 no. 5 (Text: Johann Ludwig Uhland)
- Erlösung (Text: Anna Ritter)
- Saphiren sind die Augen dein (in 6 Lieder) (Text: Heinrich Heine)
- Sehnsucht (Text: Anna Ritter)
- Sérénade (Text: Jules Bertrand)
- Tag und Nacht (in Drei Lieder) (Text: Gustav Renner)
- Unter'm Machendelbaum (in Drei Lieder) (Text: Ernst von Wildenbruch)
- Sonata for cello and piano in G Minor, Opus 40 (1909)
- Die Bajadere, cantata for chorus and orchestra
- Wonne des Himmels, cantata for soloists, chorus and orchestra
- Das Bacchusfest, cantata for chorus and orchestra (1880)
- Lindoro, comic opera in one act (1879)
- Quartet for piano and strings, No. 1 in A Major, Opus 9, Im Sommer, 1883;
- Quartet for piano and strings, No. 2 in D major, Op 11, Spanish Quartet, 1883
- Quartet for piano and strings, No. 3, 1879

Her works have been recorded and issued on CD, including:

- Héritte-Viardot: Piano Quartets Viardot En

== Genealogy ==
- Manuel García (1775–1832), singer, composer, impresario; married Joaquina Sitches (1780–1864)
  - Manuel García Junior (1805–1906), singer, composer, singing teacher; married Cécile Maria "Eugénie" Mayer (1814–1880)
    - Manuel García (1836–1885)
    - Gustave García (1837–1925), baritone and singing teacher; married Emily Matilda Ann Martorell (1835–?)
      - Alberto García (1875–1946), baritone
    - Eugenie Harouel (1840–1924)
    - Marie Crèpet (1842–1867)
  - Maria Malibran (1808–1836), singer; married Francois Eugene Malibran (1781–1836) (no issue); married Charles Auguste de Bériot (1802–1870), composer, violinist
    - Charles-Wilfrid de Bériot (1833–1914), pianist, composer, professor at the École Niedermeyer
  - Pauline Viardot (1821–1910), singer, composer; married Louis Viardot (1800–1883)
    - Louise Héritte-Viardot (1841–1918), composer, pianist, singer
    - Claudie Viardot (1852–1914); married Georges Chamerot; had issue
    - Marianne Viardot (1854–1919), painter, briefly engaged to Gabriel Fauré; married Alphonse Duvernoy
    - Paul Viardot (1857–1941)
