= Paul Viardot =

French violinist and composer

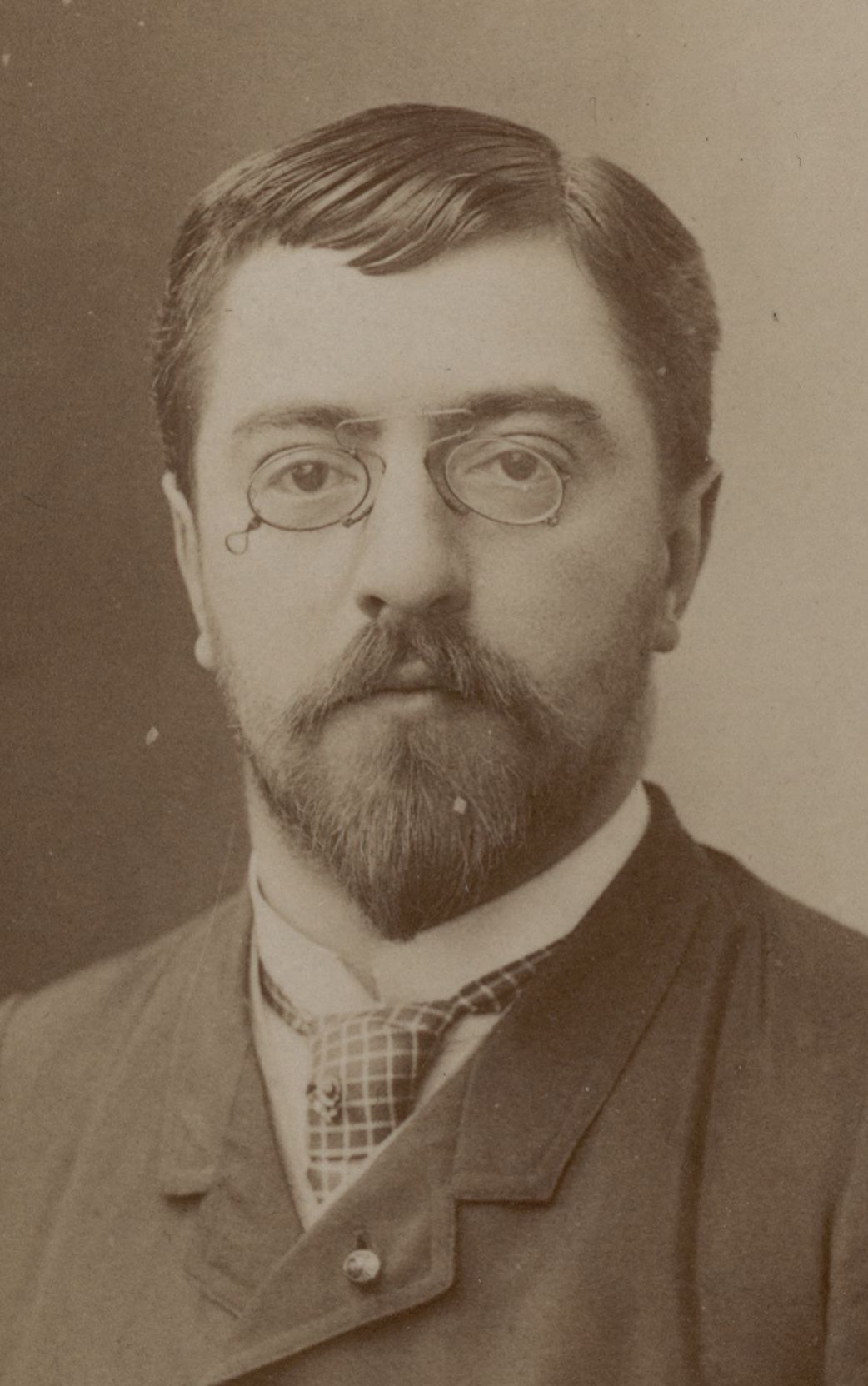
Paul Viardot

Paul Viardot (French: [pɔl vjaʁdo]; 20 July 1857 – 1 December 1941) was a French violinist and composer who appeared with great success in Paris and London.

== Life ==
Viardot was born in Courtavenel, son of the distinguished singer and composer Pauline Viardot. The Belgian violinist Charles de Bériot, second husband of Paul's aunt, Maria Malibran, remained close to the Viardots and took an interest in the boy, though Paul actually studied with Bériot's successor at the Brussels Conservatoire, Hubert Léonard (also related by marriage to the Garcia clan). Though Carl Flesch dismissed Paul Viardot as a salon player, he was clearly more than that, as he toured widely. He was a close friend to Gabriel Fauré, who was briefly engaged to his sister Marianne, and dedicated his first violin sonata to him.

Viardot's recordings are rare, and some were poorly engineered. But they are examples of the Franco-Belgian school of violin playing in its rather tight phase, before the loosening and relaxing influence of Eugène Ysaÿe.

Viardot's compositions include two sonatas, several concert solos and smaller violin works as well as important contributions to the literature of music.

== Genealogy ==
- Manuel García (1775–1832), singer, composer, impresario; married Joaquina Sitches (1780–1864)
  - Manuel García Junior (1805–1906), singer, composer, singing teacher; married Cécile Maria "Eugénie" Mayer (1814–1880)
    - Manuel García (1836–1885)
    - Gustave García (1837–1925), baritone and singing teacher; married Emily Matilda Ann Martorell (1835–?)
      - Alberto García (1875–1946), baritone
    - Eugenie Harouel (1840–1924)
    - Marie Crèpet (1842–1867)
  - Maria Malibran (1808–1836), singer; married Francois Eugene Malibran (1781–1836) (no issue); married Charles Auguste de Bériot (1802–1870), composer, violinist
    - Charles-Wilfrid de Bériot (1833–1914), pianist, composer, professor at the École Niedermeyer
  - Pauline Viardot (1821–1910), singer, composer; married Louis Viardot (1800–1883)
    - Louise Héritte-Viardot (1841–1918), composer, pianist, singer
    - Claudie Viardot (1852–1914); married Georges Chamerot; had issue
    - Marianne Viardot (1854–1919), painter, briefly engaged to Gabriel Fauré; married Alphonse Duvernoy
    - Paul Viardot (1857–1941)
