= Charles-Wilfrid de Bériot =

French pianist, teacher and composer

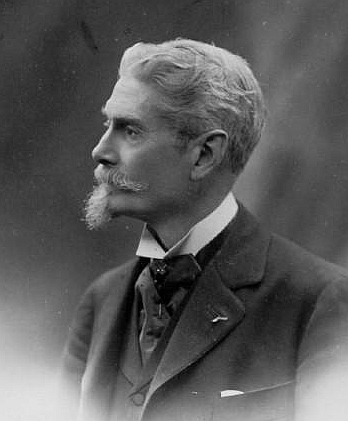
Charles-Wilfrid de Bériot

Charles-Wilfrid de Bériot (French: [ʃaʁl wilfʁid də beʁjo]; 12 February 1833 – 22 October 1914) was a French pianist, teacher and composer.

He was born in Paris in 1833, the son of the violinist Charles Auguste de Bériot and his then common-law wife, the famed soprano Maria Malibran (they were to marry when Charles-Wilfrid was three, but his mother died only three months later as a result of a fall from a horse, while pregnant with Charles-Wilfrid's sibling). Charles-Wilfrid was brought up mostly by his aunt, Pauline Viardot. His stepmother, Maria Huber, was an orphan who had been adopted by Prince von Dietrichstein, the alleged natural father of Sigismond Thalberg. Thalberg was one of Charles-Wilfrid's earliest teachers.

He became a professor of piano at the École Niedermeyer, and later at the Paris Conservatoire, where his pupils included Maurice Ravel and Ricardo Viñes. His private students included Enrique Granados. As a teacher, he insisted on extreme refinement in tone production, which strongly influenced Granados's own teaching of pedal technique.

He composed four piano concertos. There is also a Sonata for Two Pianos, Op. 61. His Flute Sonata, Op. 64 has been recorded. Many of his scores are preserved at the Ricardo Viñes Piano Music Collection at the University of Colorado at Boulder.

Ravel dedicated his Rapsodie espagnole to Charles-Wilfrid de Bériot.

He died at Sceaux-du-Gâtinais in 1914, aged 81.

== Genealogy ==
- Manuel García (1775–1832), singer, composer, impresario; married Joaquina Sitches (1780–1864)
  - Manuel García Junior (1805–1906), singer, composer, singing teacher; married Cécile Maria "Eugénie" Mayer (1814–1880)
    - Manuel García (1836–1885)
    - Gustave García (1837–1925), baritone and singing teacher; married Emily Matilda Ann Martorell (1835–?)
      - Alberto García (1875–1946), baritone
    - Eugenie Harouel (1840–1924)
    - Marie Crèpet (1842–1867)
  - Maria Malibran (1808–1836), singer; married Francois Eugene Malibran (1781–1836) (no issue); married Charles Auguste de Bériot (1802–1870), composer, violinist
    - Charles-Wilfrid de Bériot (1833–1914), pianist, composer, professor at the École Niedermeyer
  - Pauline Viardot (1821–1910), singer, composer; married Louis Viardot (1800–1883)
    - Louise Héritte-Viardot (1841–1918), composer, pianist, singer
    - Claudie Viardot (1852–1914); married Georges Chamerot; had issue
    - Marianne Viardot (1854–1919), painter, briefly engaged to Gabriel Fauré; married Alphonse Duvernoy
    - Paul Viardot (1857–1941)
