= Maria Malibran fund =

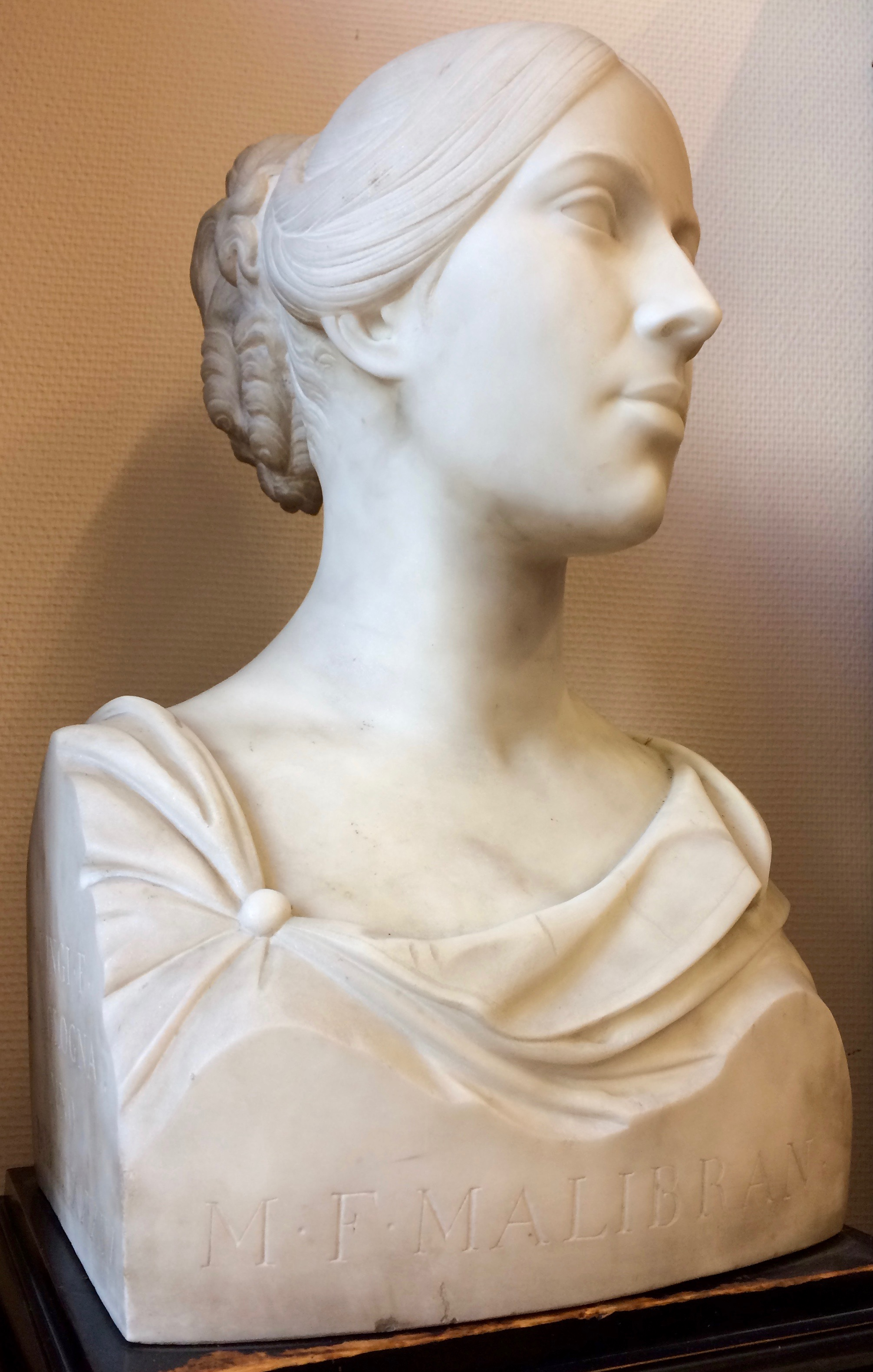
Bust of M. F. Malibran, signed "F. Giungi in Bologna anno 1834" (Royal Conservatory of Brussels, Surveillance Committee room)

The Maria Malibran collection is the donation, made in 1913 by the widow of the Belgian lieutenant general Henri Emmanuel Wauwermans to the Royal Conservatory of Brussels, of a part of her husband's collection of documents and belongings from the illustrious mezzo-soprano Maria Malibran and her close family.

== The collection ==
Consisting of some 250 pieces of considerable historic value, the Malibran collection contains several archival sections including autograph letters, contracts, books, scores, busts, portraits and iconographic documents, relics and personal objects, as well as various documents related to the diva. The collection was catalogued electronically by the Flemish Brussels Conservatory (Koninklijk Conservatorium Brussel).

=== Autograph letters ===
This historically significant section comprises three types of letters: a handwritten letter of Malibran, copies of letters addressed to the cantatrice (and to her second husband, Charles Auguste de Bériot), and some forty letters from famous rivals or admirers such as Rossini, Bellini, Donizetti, Spontini, Auber, Halévy and Liszt, or the librettist and playwright Jean-Nicolas Bouilly, paying homage to the « angel, enchanting siren, putting spectators on fire ».

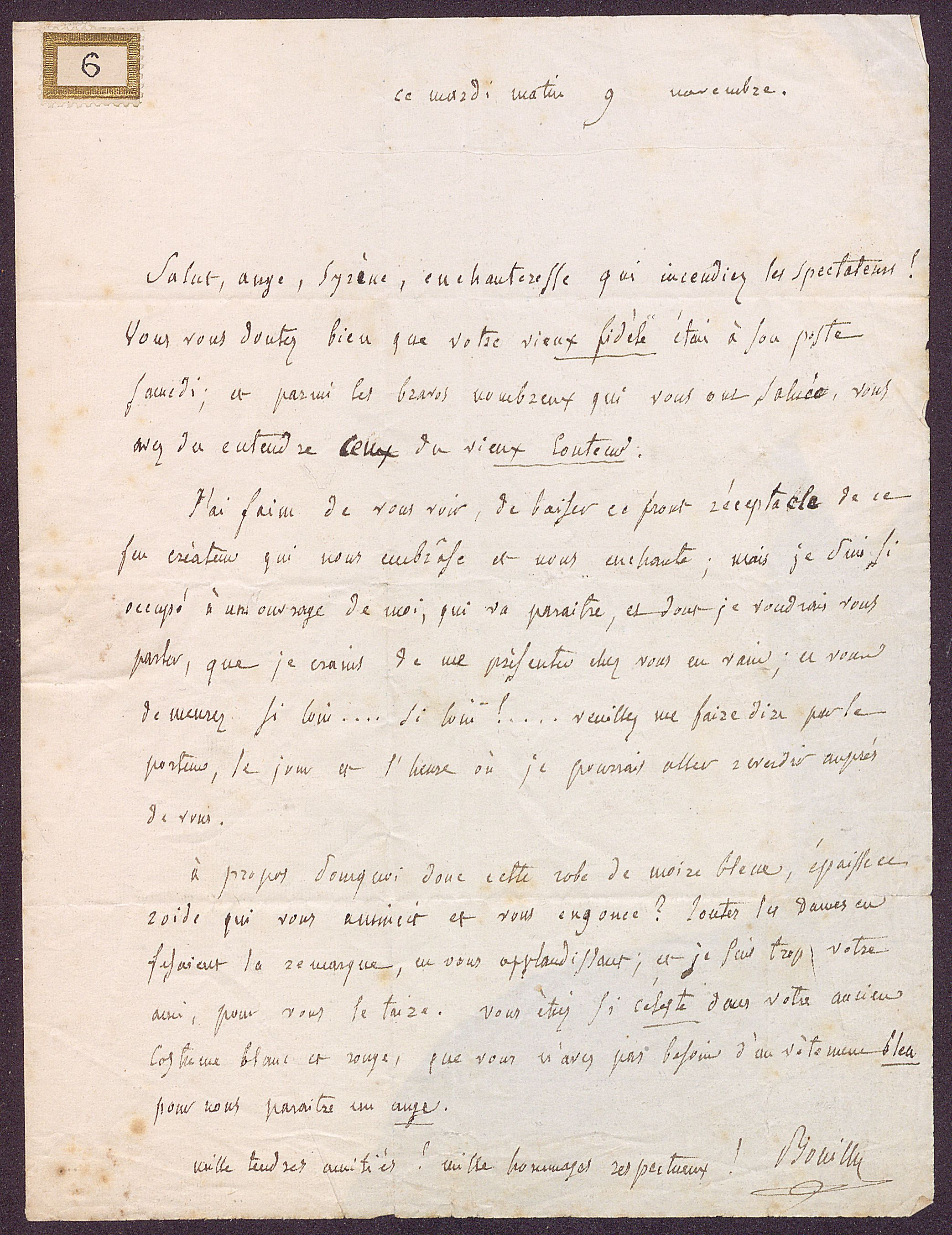
Letter from the librettist J.-N. Bouilly to M. Malibran (Library of the Royal Conservatory of Brussels, B-Bc, FC-2-MM-003/6)

=== Contracts ===
Drafted in Italian or French and extending over an eight-year period (1828-1836), the twenty-four contracts of the collection shed light on the working conditions, the – sometimes steep – remuneration, or the repertoire imposed on the singer by some European theatres. As such, Alfred Bunn, the precautious director of the Drury Lane Royal Theatre in London, obliges the artist to share with him part of her fee to cover incurred expenses and risks.

=== Books, scores and varia ===
The Malibran library supposedly stayed between the hands of her husband or transferred to her sister, the mezzo-soprano Pauline Viardot. The library includes pieces, such as two bound missals, Le petit paroissien complet and La voie du salut, a small in-12 format brochure with the English version of the Fidelio libretto, and handwritten notes from Malibran.

This section is completed by a series of music scores – two autograph compilations of works of the cantatrice, three collections of dedicated romances and a few music manuscripts – press clippings, concert programs and posters, as well as a series of poems, stanzas or texts devoted to the prima donna.

=== Busts, portraits and iconographic documents ===
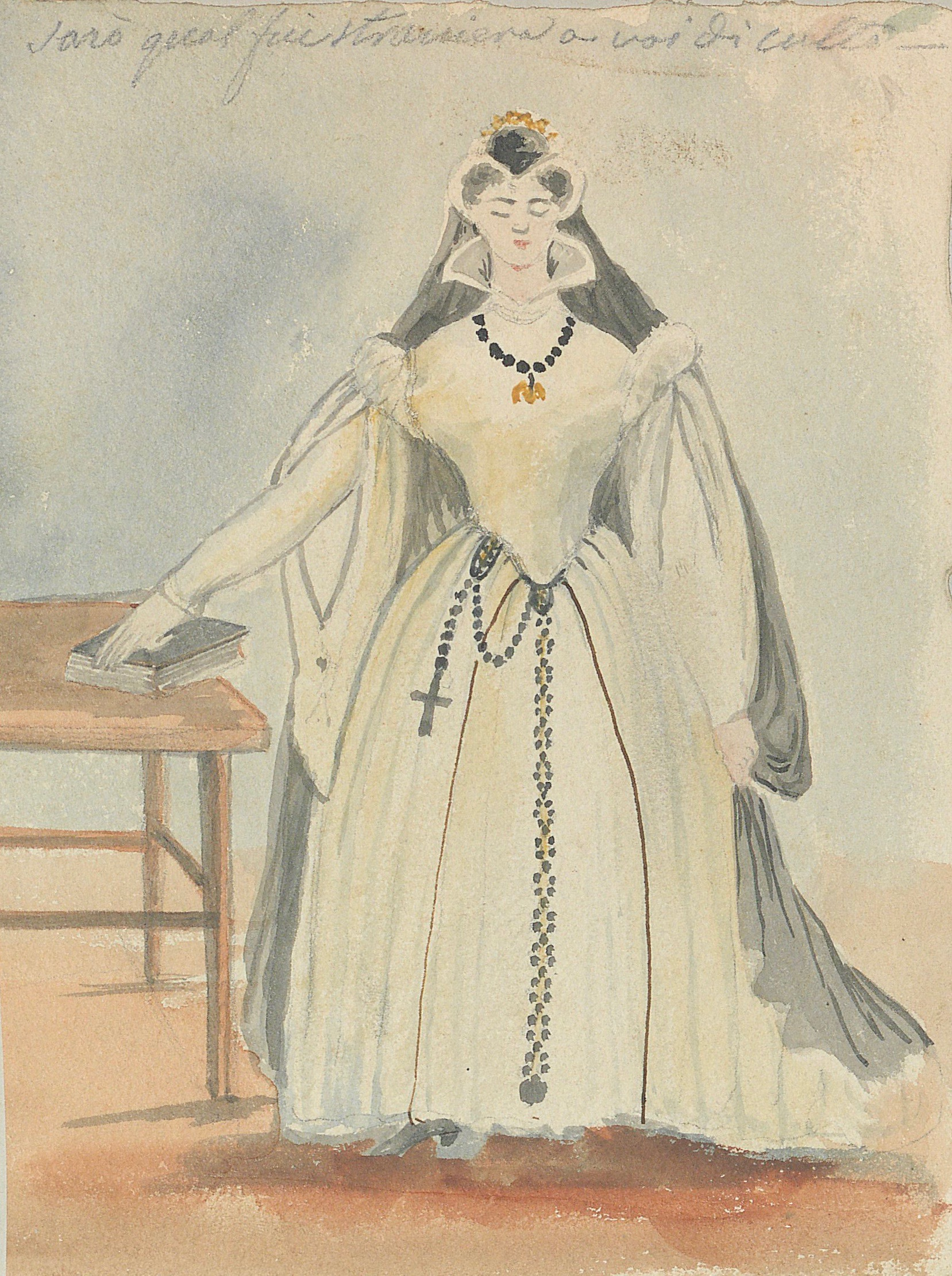
Costume project by M. Malibran for Mary Stuart, from La réforme du théâtre (Library of the Royal Conservatory of Brussels, B-Bc, FC-2-MM-073)

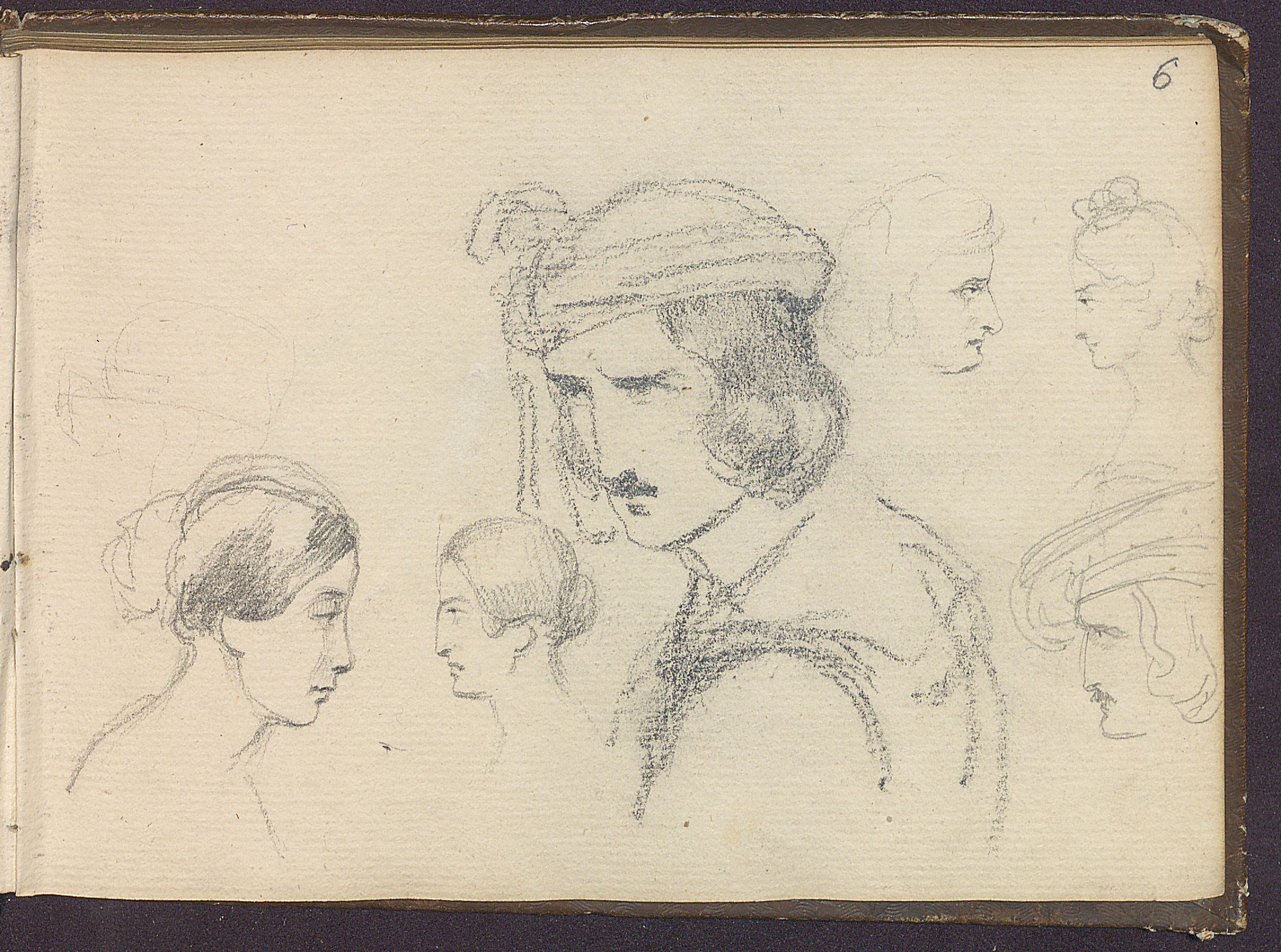
Page from the sketchbook of M. Malibran (Library of the Royal Conservatory of Brussels, B-Bc, FC-2-MM-075)

One of the most attaching parts of the collection, this section holds several artworks given to the diva during her tournées, such as this very delicate, signed and dated bust of white marble, a large gold medal commemorating her interpretation of Norma at La Scala (1836) and some fifteen portraits of her – lithographs, black-lead drawings, pastels or photographic reproductions – including an interesting lithograph (1851) from her nephew Léon Viardot. Other documents have a more sentimental value: they include Malibran's travel watercolours as well as a small sketchbook by her hand, revealing her unsuspected drawing talent. This aptitude also transpires in the two surprising La Réforme du Théâtre volumes, an initiative of the singer to modernize theatre costumes and assembling some fifty colour projects.

=== Relics and personal objects ===
Some of Malibran's personal objects, familiar or charged with history, form the very core of the collection: a small salt flask, an incised crystal bedside lamp, a score briefcase in leather, a travel writing desk, the riding whip used during her fatal cavalcade, a long hairpiece cut after her death, a death mask, a shred from the pall torn in pieces by the crowd attending her funeral at the Laeken Cemetery, where de Bériot had an impressive cenotaph erected to her memory.

=== Malibran's death ===
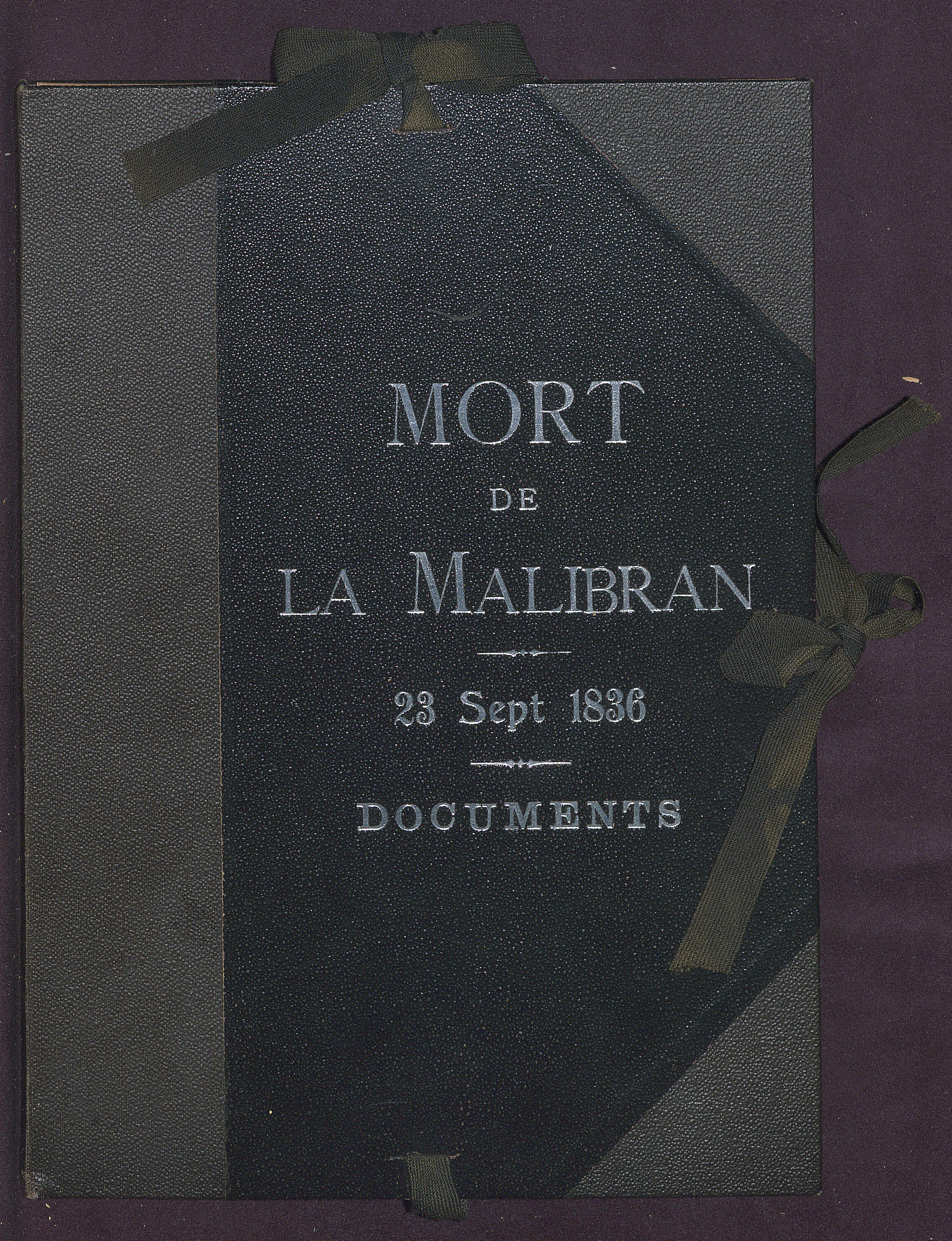
Map holding various documents related to Malibran's death (Library of the Royal Conservatory of Brussels, B-Bc, FC-2-MM-006/1)

This last part includes documents related to Malibran's death – in particular the original act, on parchment, by which the ecclesiastical authority of Manchester authorizes, following the demand of Charles Auguste de Bériot, the exhumation and transfer of the body to Belgium, as well as the French translation of the poignant funerary report made in London by Malibran's GP, Dr. Jos Belluomini, who stayed at her bedside for a week and attested her death on the morning of 23 September 1836.

== Appendix ==
=== Selective discography ===
- Cecilia Bartoli, Maria, CD + DVD, Decca 478 3399, 2007. For the preparation of this recording dedicated to Malibran, the famous Italian mezzo-soprano came to document herself on the subject at the Royal Conservatory of Brussels.

=== Bibliography ===
- Paul Raspé, « Le souvenir de la Malibran au Conservatoire Royal de Musique de Bruxelles », Cahiers Tourguéniev et Pouchkine, n°11, 1987.

=== External links ===
- Koninklijk Conservatorium Brussel (English)
- Conservatoire Royal de Bruxelles (French)
- Royal Conservatory of Brussels library catalog
- Royal Conservatory of Brussels library catalog - Maria Malibran
