= Jean-Baptiste Accolay =

Violinist, conductor and composer

- Born: 17 April 1833; Brussels, Belgium
- Died: 19 August 1900 (aged 67); Bruges, Belgium
- Occupations: Violinist; Violin teacher; Conductor; Composer

Jean-Baptiste Accolay (French pronunciation: [ʒɑ̃ batist akɔlɛ]; 17 April 1833 – 19 August 1900) was a Belgian violin teacher, violinist, conductor, and composer of the romantic period. His best-known composition is his one-movement student concerto in A minor. It was written in 1868, originally for violin and orchestra.

== Biography ==
Born in Brussels, Accolay studied the violin at the Royal Conservatory of Brussels and played the solo flugelhorn at the second cuirassier-regiment of Bruges. He also played the first violin at the orchestra of the theaters of Namur and Bruges. In 1860, he became a teacher of solfège at the conservatory of Bruges. Later on he also taught the violin (1861-1864), the viola (1864), string quartets (1865), and harmony (1874). He stayed at the conservatory until his death in 1900.

He cofounded the concert series Séances de musique classique at Bruges in 1865 and the Maatschappij der Concerten van het Conservatorium in 1896. He also conducted the brass band of the Brugse Jagers-Verkenners.

Most of Accolay's works are concertos, concertinos, or character pieces for violin with piano or orchestral accompaniment.

== Concerto in A minor ==
Accolay's Concerto in A minor has been played by many well-known violinists, including Itzhak Perlman. The liner notes for Perlman's recording of "Concertos from My Childhood" indicate that there are at least "seven works by the long forgotten Belgian violinist and teacher Jean-Baptiste Accolay, whose concertos (including the one in question) were edited for publication by the Walloon virtuoso Mathieu Crickboom, a protégé of Eugène Ysaÿe, and professor at the Royal Conservatory in Brussels." Accolay's Concerto in A minor (1868) is "one of the most enduring of all tutorial violin concertos, it is still regularly studied today. Though its executant demands are slight, this agreeably spontaneous piece highlights one of music's great paradoxes — that expressive power often derives from the simplest of technical means."

== Bibliography ==
- van den Borren, Charles (1958). "Accolay (Jean-Baptiste)". Biographie Nationale (in French). Vol. 30, supplement II. Brussels: l'Académie Royale des Sciences, des Lettres et des Beaux-Arts de Belgique. pp. 7–8.
- Gregoir, Édouard Georges Jacques, ed. (1875). "Accolay (J.-B.)". Documents historiques relatives à l'art musical et aux artistes-musiciens (in French). Vol. 3. Brussels: Schott frères. p. 91.
- Gregoir, Édouard Georges Jacques (1885). "Accolay (Jean-Baptiste)". Les artistes-musiciens belges au XVIIIme et au XIXme siècle (in French). Brussels: Schott frères. p. 16.
- Maertens, Jaak (2004). "Accolay, Jean-Baptiste". In Defoort, Antoon (ed.). Lexicon van de muziek in West-Vlaanderen (in Dutch). Vol. 5. Bruges: Vereniging van West-Vlaamse Schrijvers. p. 43. ISBN 90-72390-27-X.
- Roquet, Flavie (2007). "Accolay, Jean-Baptiste". Lexicon Vlaamse componisten geboren na 1800 (in Dutch). Roeselare: Roularta. pp. 9–10. ISBN 978-90-8679-090-6.
