= The Maid of Artois =

Opera by Michael William Balfe

- Opera by Michael William Balfe
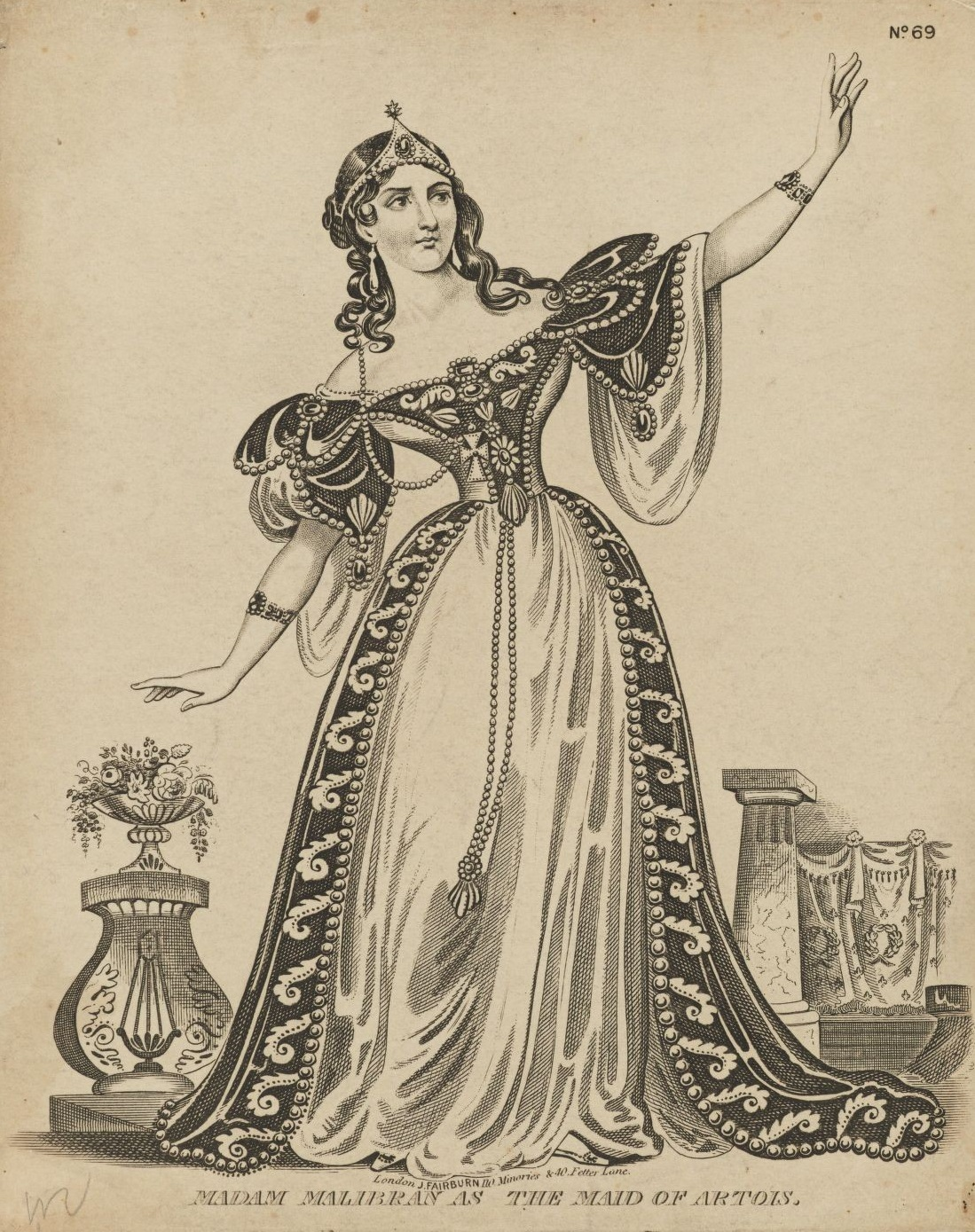
- Maria Malibran, the first singer of the title role, for whom Balfe wrote the opera
- Librettist: Alfred Bunn
- Language: English
- Based on: Manon Lescaut by Abbé Prévost
- Premiere: 27 May 1836; Drury Lane Theatre, London

The Maid of Artois is an opera by Michael William Balfe, written in 1836 to a libretto by Alfred Bunn, manager of the Theatre Royal, Drury Lane, in London, who based his work on Eugène Scribe's stage version of Abbé Prévost's novel Manon Lescaut.

== Overview ==
The opera opened on 27 May 1836, starring Maria Malibran as the title character, Isoline. The story concerns a girl in love, who is poached by a rich Marquis. The lovers seem destined to end their days in the wastes of the desert, until an unexpected rescue comes. The opera received good notices, and the overture was much admired.

Balfe's music shows the influence of his earlier training in Italy, especially of Bellini and Donizetti, as well as the French works that Balfe had sung (as a baritone) at the Paris Opéra, where he and Malibran had appeared together. Balfe wrote The Maid of Artois partly as a vehicle for her. Malibran was a mezzo-soprano with a three octave range. She had died in September 1836 before the score was printed, and so Balfe decided to set brighter, higher versions of the coloratura and other music in her role that are more typical of operatic treatments of a youthful character such as Isoline.

== Roles ==
- Isoline contralto
- Jules tenor
- Marquis baritone
- Synnelet bass
- Coralie
- Sans Regret
- Martin
- Centinnel
- Count Saulnier

== Musical numbers ==
Act 1

The grounds of a Parisian Chateau

- 1 Men – Drink, boys
- 2 Marquis – Recit. The Rosy hours
- 2a Marquis, Sans R, Chorus – Cavatina Then silly is the heart
- 3 Andante
- 4 Jules – Recit. Oh, if at times
- 4a Jules – Cavatina My soul, in one unbroken
- 5 Sans R & Jules – Here, take the contents
- 6 Coralie, Jules, Sans R, Men – Then thus oppress’d
- 7 Women – The sigh from her heart
- 8 Isoline – Recit. My thoughts which forth
  - Isoline – The heart that once hath
  - Isoline, Women – Oh could I but that peace
- 9 Isoline, Marquis – Oh! leave me not
- 9a Isoline, Marquis – Oh, why should I weep
- 10 Isoline – Yon moon o’er the mountains
- 11 Jules, Isoline, – Finale: What sounds are those I hear
- 11a Isoline, Jules, Marquis – Finale: Trio My bosom with hope
- 12 Marquis, Isoline, Jules – Finale: Ensemble Deceitful woman
  - Sans Regret, Chorus, Count

Act 2

A fort in British Guiana

- 13 Men, Women and slaves – Here’s to the Soldier Lover
- 14 Synnelet, Chorus – Was there ever known
- 15 Ballet
- 16 Isoline – Oh! what a charm it is
- 17 Isoline, Jules, Nin, Syn, Chor Quartet & Ch – From shore to shore
- 18 Indian Dance
- 19 Isoline & Jules – And do these arms
- 19a Jules, Isoline – I have strength to bear
- 19b Martin, Isol, Jules, Nin, Syn Ensemble – Five minutes are expired
- 20 Chorus, Syn, Cent, Martin – Finale These joyous sounds upon the ear
- 21 Marquis – Recit. I gaze upon the stranger land
- 21a Marquis – The light of the other days is faded
- 22 Chorus, Marquis, Synnelet – Finale Hail to the Chief

Act 3

In the Desert

- 23 Isoline – Recit. The sounds which have pursued
- 23a Isoline – Oh, beautiful night
- 24 Isoline, Jules – There’s blood upon his arm
- 25 March
- 26 Isoline, Chorus – Finale: The rapture swelling though my breast
