= Conservatory String Quartet =

Canadian string quartet

The Conservatory String Quartet (CSQ) was a Canadian string quartet in residence at The Royal Conservatory of Music during the first half of the 20th century. The group actively performed in the Toronto area and regularly toured throughout the Province of Ontario. The quartet also notably toured to Montreal in 1942 and 1943. The ensemble performed not only the standard string quartet repertoire but also performed new works by contemporary Canadian composers like Patricia Blomfield Holt, Walter MacNutt, and John Weinzweig. The ensemble was also heard many times on CBC Radio but never produced any recordings.

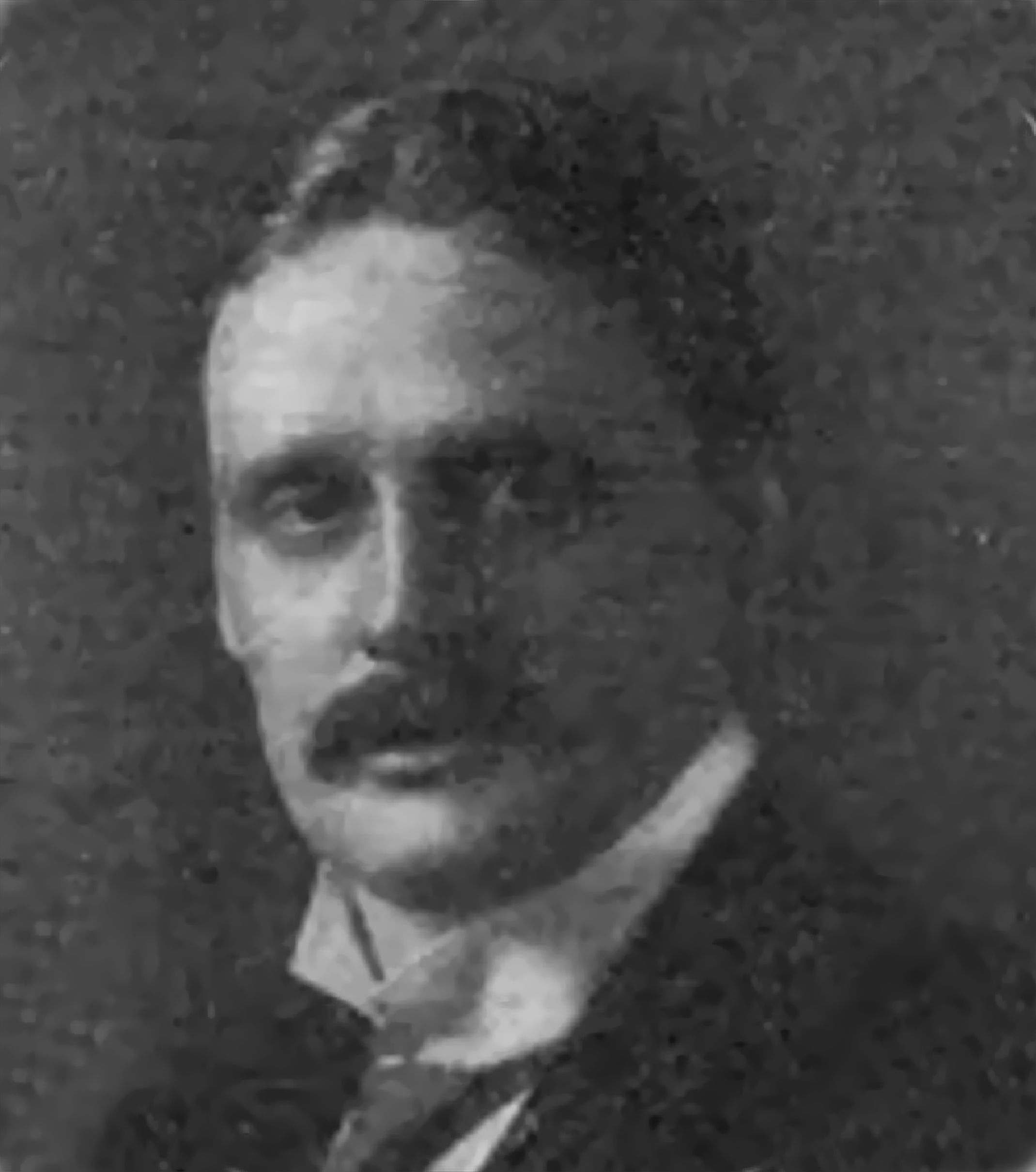
Viggo Kihl, 1913

The CSQ was founded by violinist Elie Spivak in 1929 at the behest of the conservatory's president, Ernest MacMillan. The group's other original members consisted of violinist Harold Sumberg, violist Donald Heins, and cellist Leo Smith. The ensemble gave its debut performance on 26 October 1929 with guest artists Alberto Guererro, Norah Drewett de Kresz, Florence Singer, Viggo Kihl, and MacMillan. On 19 January 1932, the quartet premiered Smith's Quartet in D.

In 1934 Heins left the CSQ and was succeeded by violist Tom Brennand. Brennand left three years later and was replaced by Cecil Figelski. In 1942, cellist Zara Nelsova joined the group after the departure of Smith. Both Nelsova and Figelski left in 1944 and the group then added Joyce Sands and Harold Carter to their numbers. At the time of the group's disbandment in 1946, the ensemble consisted of violinist Pearl Palmason, Goldie Bell, and Carter, and Sands. The group was disestablished largely due to illnesses faced by some of its members.
