= Concertos from My Childhood =

Studio album by Itzhak Perlman, Lawrence Foster, Juilliard Orchestra
- Released: 1999
- Genre: Classical
- Length: 55:23
- Label: EMI
- Producer: John Fraser

Concertos from My Childhood is a collection of famous student concertos, performed by Itzhak Perlman. They are all important pieces in violin pedagogy for beginning to intermediate students. The orchestra is from New York's Juilliard School, where Perlman has been a professor since 1999.

== Track listing ==
1. Rieding: Violin Concerto in B minor, Op.35 – 1. Allegro moderato 2:57
2. Rieding: Violin Concerto in B minor, Op.35 – 2. Andante 2:23
3. Rieding: Violin Concerto in B minor, Op.35 – 3. Allegro moderato 2:55
4. Seitz: Student Concerto for violin & orchestra No. 2 in G major, Op. 13 – 1. Allegro non-troppo 4:27
5. Seitz: Student Concerto for violin & orchestra No. 2 in G major, Op. 13 – 2. Adagio 2:12
6. Seitz: Student Concerto for violin & orchestra No. 2 in G major, Op. 13 – 3. Allegretto moderato 2:49
7. Accolay: Violin Concerto No.1 in A minor 7:42
8. de Bériot: Scène de ballet for violin & piano (or orchestra), Op 100 9:55
9. Viotti: Concerto for violin & orchestra No. 22 in A minor, G97 – 1. Moderato 13:15
10. Viotti: Concerto for violin & orchestra No. 22 in A minor, G97 – 2. Adagio 6:57
11. Viotti: Concerto for violin & orchestra No. 22 in A minor, G97 – 3. Agitato assai 7:10

== Production ==
Recorded at LeFrak Concert Hall, Colden Center for the Performing Arts, Queens College, City University of New York.
