= Zara Nelsova =

Canadian musician

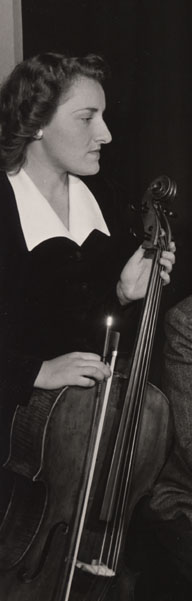

Background information
- Born: Sara Katznelson; December 23, 1918; Winnipeg, Canada
- Died: October 10, 2002 (aged 83) New York City, USA
- Genre: Classical
- Occupation: Musician
- Instrument: Cello
- Label: Decca-London
- Spouse: Grant Johannesen (m. 1966; div. 1973)

Zara Nelsova (December 23, 1918 – October 10, 2002) was a prominent cellist.

== Biography ==
Nelsova was born Sara Katznelson in Winnipeg, Canada, to parents of Jewish-Russian descent. Nelsova first performed at the age of five in Winnipeg. She eventually moved with her family to London, England, where she studied at the London Cello School with its principal, Herbert Walenn. She was heard by Sir John Barbirolli and introduced by him to Pablo Casals from whom she received additional lessons. In 1932, aged only 13, she gave a London debut recital and appeared as soloist with Sir Malcolm Sargent and the London Symphony Orchestra. During World War II she was principal cellist of the Toronto Symphony Orchestra and in 1942 made her United States solo debut at Town Hall in New York. From 1942 to 1944, she was cellist of the Conservatory String Quartet.

In 1949 Nelsova moved to London, where she introduced to Britain new works by Samuel Barber, Paul Hindemith, Dmitri Shostakovich and Ernest Bloch, who dedicated his three suites for unaccompanied cello to her. She premiered Hugh Wood's concerto at the 1969 Promenade concerts. In 1955 she became an American citizen and performed as a soloist with major orchestras, including Boston, Winnipeg, Montreal and the New York Philharmonic. She also toured extensively, and in 1966 was the first North American cellist to play in the Soviet Union. Nelsova promoted the Elgar Cello Concerto when it was rarely heard, in concert and in recital with a piano reduction of the orchestral score. From 1966 to 1973 she was married to the American pianist Grant Johannesen, with whom she often performed and recorded. Her dignified, introspective readings of Bloch's Schelomo and Barber's Cello Concerto were both recorded with the composers conducting and later recorded Schelomo under Ernest Ansermet, also for the Decca-London label.)

She played a Stradivari cello, the "Marquis de Corberon" of 1726. She taught at the Juilliard School from 1962 to 2002, the year of her death.

In 2002, Nelsova died in New York City, aged 83.

== Zara Nelsova Award for Emerging Cellist ==
An award was given in Nelsova's name at the 2008 Naumburg International Violoncello Competition; the winner was Saeunn Thorsteinsdottir, from Iceland. At the 2011 International Cello Festival of Canada an award in her name was presented to Se-Doo Park.
