= Norah Drewett de Kresz =

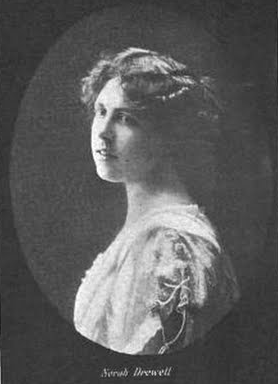
- Norah Drewett, from a 1908 publication.
- Born: Norah Drewett; 14 June 1882; Sutton, England
- Died: 24 April 1960 (aged 77); Budapest, Hungary
- Occupations: Pianist, music educator

Norah Drewett de Kresz (14 June 1882 – 24 April 1960), born Norah Drewett, was an English-born pianist and music educator.

== Early life ==
Norah Drewett was born in Sutton, London in 1882. She studied piano under Alphonse Duvernoy at the Conservatoire de Paris, with composer Bernhard Stavenhagen in Münich, and with Leonid Kreutzer in Berlin.

== Career ==
=== Solo career ===
When Drewett played a Beethoven piano concerto at London's Crystal Palace in 1905, a reviewer described the performance as "neat in execution and intelligent in conception". "Miss Drewett has intelligence, vigour, and expressive power in a high degree," noted another reviewer that year, "in addition to which she has that which cannot be taught – genuine and infectious pleasure in her own playing." She played in Belfast, Vienna, and Berlin in 1908. She visited with writer Ossip Schubin during a stay in Germany in 1908. She played at the Proms in 1913.

In 1922, Drewett wrote about the music scene in Berlin for Fanfare, a London-based periodical. In Canada, she played in a piano ensemble performance, with four male pianists (Ernest Seitz, Viggo Kihl, Reginald Stewart, and Alberto Guerrero) in Edmonton in 1927. She also played at the debut performance of the Conservatory String Quartet in 1929.

=== With Géza de Kresz ===
Drewett was perhaps best known for her long professional association with her husband, Hungarian violinist Géza de Kresz. Russian musician Boris Hambourg invited them to join him in Toronto in 1923, and teach at his conservatory and the Toronto Conservatory of Music.

The Kreszes lived near Budapest while he was head of the National Conservatory there, from 1935 to 1947, and she taught there. They returned to North America after World War II, in 1947. "Norah Drewett and Geza de Kresz have probably been longer together without a break than any couple playing before the public today," noted an American newspaper in 1948. In 1949 they played together at New York's Town Hall.

== Personal life ==
Norah Drewett married violinist Géza de Kresz in 1918. They had two daughters. Nora Drewett de Kresz was widowed when her husband died in 1959, and she died in Budapest in 1960, aged 77 years. Their graves are together, in Kápolnásnyék. There are scrapbooks and other papers related to the careers of Drewett and de Kresz on microfilm in the archives of the University of Toronto.
