= Karl Ventzke =

German procurator and musical instrumentologist

Karl Ventzke (25 June 1933 – 2005) was a German procurator and musical instrumentologist.

== Life and achievement ==
Born in Kragen, Pommern, Ventzke studierte bis 1959 an der Hochschule für Politik München. Bis 2002 war er hauptberuflich als Prokurist in Düren tätig.

He was presbyter of the Bavarian School of Public Policy from 1967 to 1996. He was a member of the Kreissynodalvorstand from 1972 to 1988 and a Preaching aid from 1973 to 1992. He was the author and co-author of several publications on the history of the Protestant congregation in Düren, the church district of Jülich and on musicological topics.

In 1999, Ventzke bequeathed his collection of historical wind instruments to the Musicological Institute of the Universität Tübingen for teaching and research purposes. For this donation, the University of Tübingen awarded him an Dr. phil. h. c. The collection was opened in May 2000, is displayed in the back room of the library and is accessible to interested parties by appointment. It comprises more than 100 wind instruments, mainly from the 19th century. Focal points are

- the wind instruments of the symphony orchestra at the end of the 19th century
- the development of the flute from 1800 to 1925
- bassoon and basson: by Jean-Nicolas Savary (1824) until Heckel (ca. 1910)
- the wind quintet around 1810/20
- French and German saxophones.

The collection thus documents the tumultuous technical developments and new constructions in instrument making in the 19th century.

Ventzke was curator of the Schenkel-Schoeller-Stift in Düren-Niederau. He was a recipient of the citizens' medal of the city of Düren and the Kronenkreuz of the Diakony in gold.

== Publications (selection) ==
- Schema zur Bestimmung der Löcherherstellung auf Blasinstrumenten. Verlag Moeck, Celle 1980, ISBN 978-3875490114
- Porträts und Biographien hervorragender Flöten-Virtuosen, -Dilettanten und -Komponisten. Verlag Moeck, Celle 1987, ISBN 978-3875490282
- Wilhelm Wester (1889-1960). In Dirk Chr. Siedler (ed.): Wilhelm Wester. Ein Dürener Pfarrer in Zeiten des Umbruchs. Alektor-Verlag, Berlin 2009, ISBN 978-3884250860, pp. 19ff.
- Die Saxophone. Beiträge zu ihrer Bau-Charakteristik, Funktion und Geschichte. Verlag PPV Medien 2001, ISBN 978-3923639458
