= Louis Viardot =

French literary critic, impresario and translator

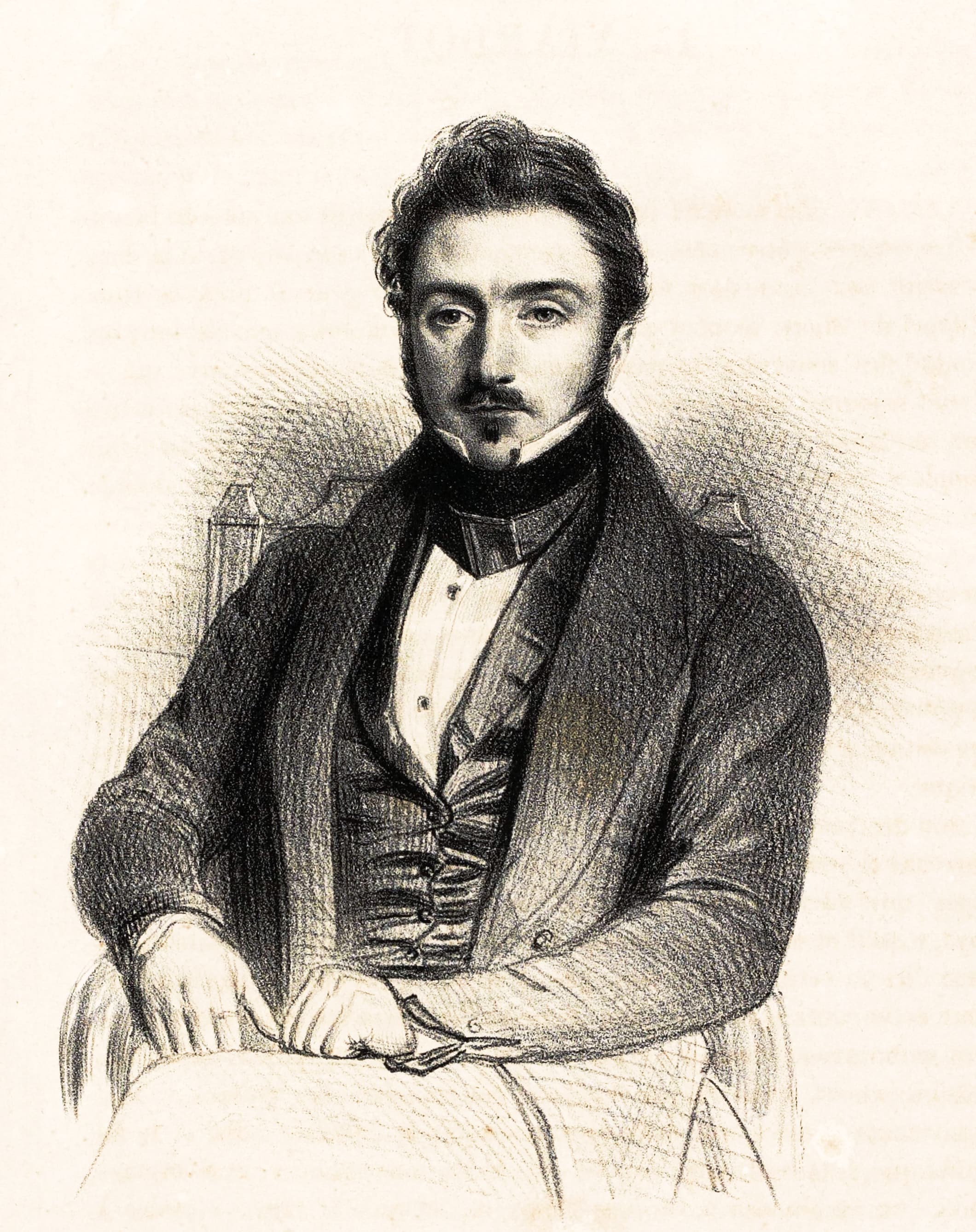
- Portrait of Louis Viardot (1840) by Émile Lassalle.
- Born: 31 July 1800; Dijon, France
- Died: 5 May 1883 (aged 82); Paris, France
- Spouse: Pauline Garcia-Viardot
- Children: daughter Louise Héritte-Viardot (1843–1918); daughter Claudie Viardot (1852–1914); son Paul Viardot (1857–1941); daughter Marianne Viardot (1854–1919)

Louis Viardot (pronounced [lwi vjaʁ.do]; 31 July 1800 in Dijon, France – 5 May 1883 in Paris, France) was a French writer, art historian, art critic, theatrical figure, and translator. As a translator, he mostly contributed to the development of Russian and Spanish literature in France. He was the older brother of the artist Léon Viardot (1805–1900).

== Biography ==
Viardot was born in a provincial family, his father was a liberal lawyer from Dijon. His father died early and left his wife with five children in poverty. Viardot had to make his own way. His first job was as a bar trail then he worked as a journalist.

When Viardot was 18 years old, he left Dijon to study law in Paris.

When he was in Paris in 1823, he started his job as a journalist. When he was twenty-three years old, he joined the French army and was deployed to Spain, during which the French army restored the monarchy there. He learned Spanish and acquainted himself with the country's history and culture. Subsequently, he translated the Miguel de Cervantes novel Don Quixote into French.

=== George Sand and the Viardot family ===
Viardot worked for the newspaper Le Globe (1828) alongside Pierre Leroux, who introduced him to George Sand.

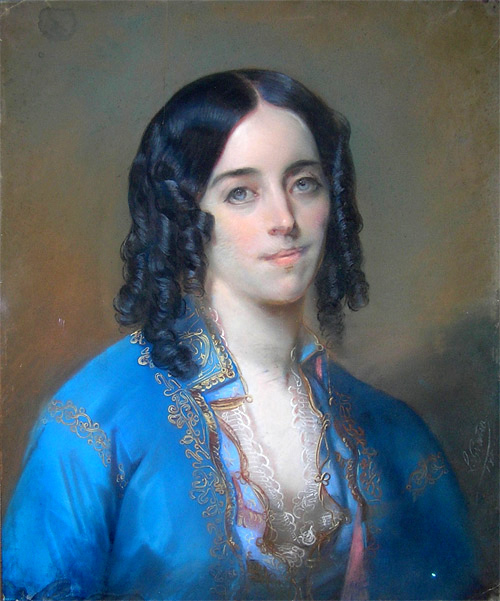
George Sand by Charles Louis Gratia (c. 1835)

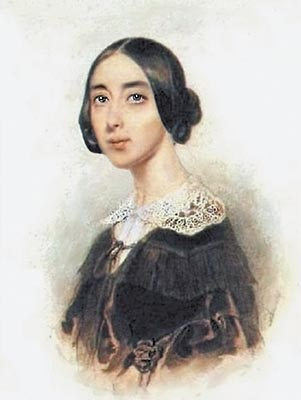
Portrait of songstress Pauline Garcia-Viardot by Pyotr Fyodorovich Sokolov (1830s).

In 1836 Viardot, who was already a friend of the artist Ary Scheffer, served as the attorney of Maria Malibran and managed her affairs. Her marriage with Eugene Malibran was terminated in 1836 with his help. Maria Malibran was the oldest sister of his future spouse Pauline Garcia (1821–1910). 1836 г. Pauline Garcia, sister of Maria Malibran, met George Sand in 1836. Due to George Sand already knowing Louis Viardot, Louis Viardot and his friend Ary Scheffer met Pauline Garcia, the sister of Maria Malibran and future wife of Louis, in 1836.

In 1838, after a fire destroyed the second Salle Favart, the Théâtre-Italien moved to the Théâtre de l'Odéon, and Louis served as the director of the theater from 10 November 1838 to 22 February 1840. He abandoned the position of director of the Théâtre-Italien, to devote himself to the career of his wife, and would follow her on her tours.

Viardot married Pauline Garcia on 16 April 1840. He was twenty-one years older than his wife and loved her until his death.

He had Republican political views, did not believe in God, loved hunting and hunting dogs. He said that he had uttered the words "Long live the king!" only once, when he had received an invitation to a royal hunt.

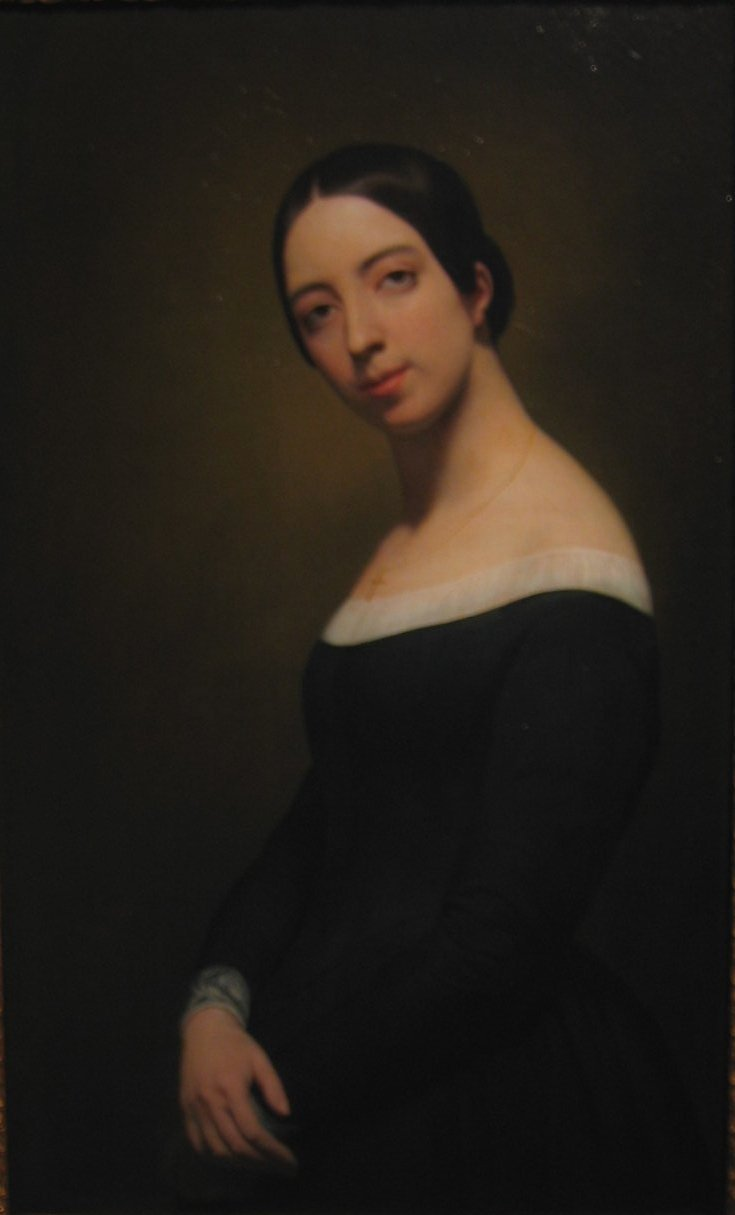
Portrait of Pauline Viardot by Ary Scheffer (1840).

In 1841, Louis Viardot, together with Pierre Leroux and George Sand, founded the socialist newspaper La Revue Indépendante, which was published for a short period.

=== Ary Scheffer and the Viardot family ===
Scheffer and Viardot were familiar and friendly in the 1830s, before Viardot's marriage. They were friends when Viardot defended the interests of Maria Malibran, the sister of his future wife, and George Sand during the trial in 1836. At one point, Viardot's younger brother, the artist Léon Viardot, studied under Scheffer.

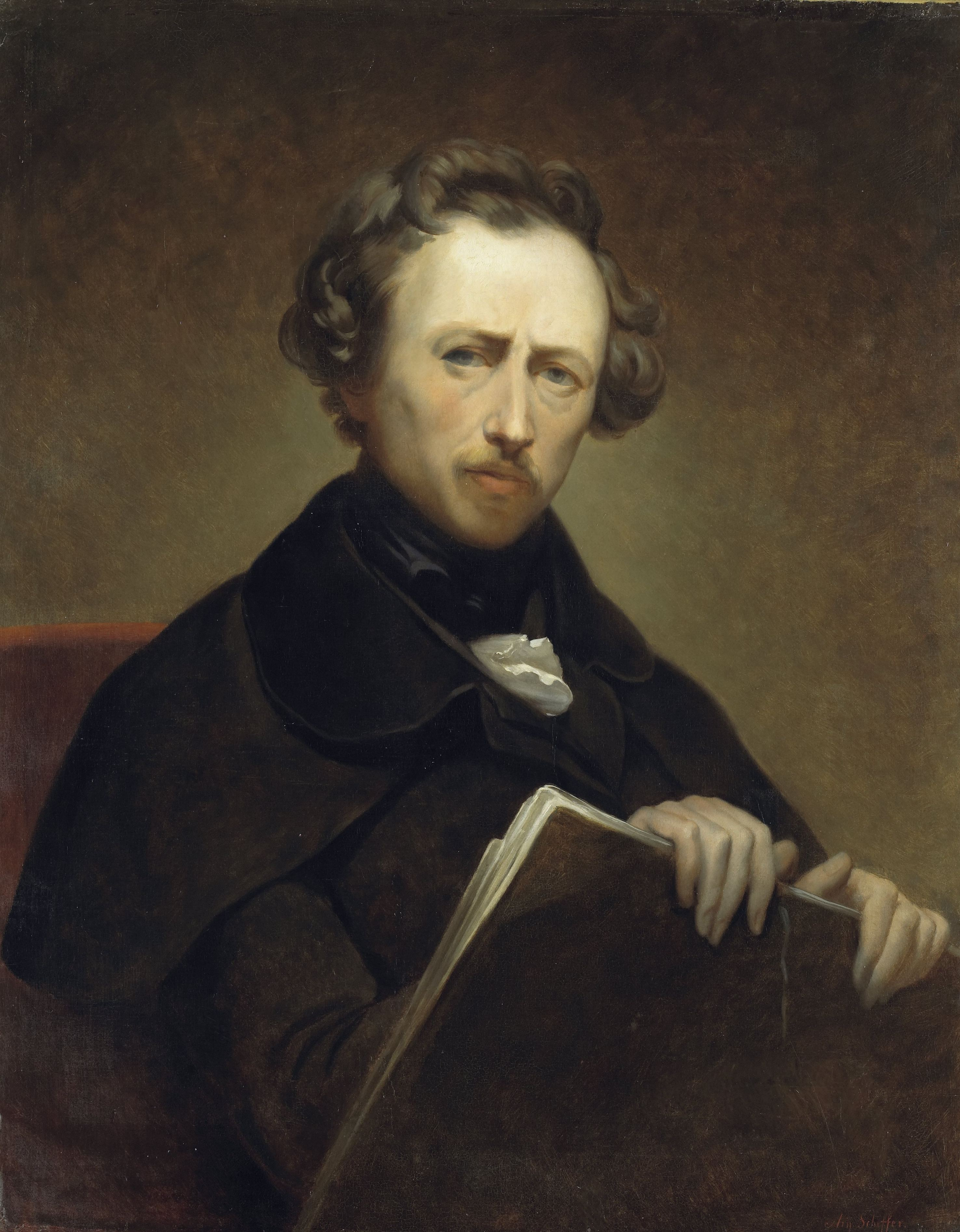
Self-portrait (circa 1838) by Scheffer

At various times Maurice Sand, Ary Scheffer, Charles Gounod, Hector Berlioz were in relationships with Pauline Viardot. In their letters they claimed that they were in love with her. She wrote in one letter:

Louis and Scheffer have always been my dearest of friends, and it is sad, that I was never able to respond to the hot and deep love of Louis, despite all my volition.

The "evil tongues" connected the birth of the daughter Claudia (Claudie) in the Viardot family with the name of Gounod and said that he was the father of Claudia, who was born on 20 May 1852. The oldest daughter Louise was ten years older than the new born Claudie. Whether Gounod is father of Claudie or not remains a mystery.

Scheffer was a confidant of Pauline Viardot and a friend of the Viardot family all his life.

In 1874, Viardot was paralyzed by a stroke and remained housebound until his death in 1883.

== Works ==
- Notices sur les principaux peintres de l'Espagne, Paris, Gavard & Paulin, 1839
- Des origines traditionnelles de la peinture moderne en Italie, Paris, Paulin, 1840.
- Catalogue des musées d'Italie, Paris, Paulin, 1842.
- Catalogue des musées d'Espagne, d'Angleterre et de Belgique, Paris, Paulin, 1843.
- Catalogue des musées d'Allemagne et de Russie, Paris, Paulin, 1844.
- Aux électeurs de Seine-et-Marne, Paris, 20 III 1848 (prospectus politique).
- Souvenirs de chasse, 1846; Paris, Paulin & Le Chevalier, 1849, 2e éd. augmentée de 5 chapitres; 1853, 5e éd.; 1854, 6e éd.; 1859, 7e éd. contenant 3 nouveaux chapitres. Réédité chez Pygmalion en 1985 sous l'intitulé : Souvenirs de chasse de toute l'Europe.
- Les Musées d'Europe. Guide et Memento de l'artiste et du voyageur, 5 volumes
  - Musées d'Italie, Paris, Hachette, 1852, rééd. 1859.
  - Musées d'Espagne, Paris, Hachette, 1852, rééd. 1855, 1860.
  - Musées d'Allemagne, Paris, Hachette, 1852, rééd. 1855, 1860, 1886.
  - Musées d'Angleterre, de Belgique, de Hollande et de Russie, Paris, Hachette, 1852, rééd. 1855, 1860.
  - Musées de France. Paris, Paris, Maison, 1855; Hachette, 1860, 2e éd. revue & très augmentée.
- Espagne et Beaux-Arts, Paris, Hachette, 1866.
- Apologie d'un incrédule, Paris, Lacroix, 1868; trad. angl., 1869.
- Les Merveilles de la peinture, Paris, Hachette, coll. "La Bibliothèque des merveilles", 1868-69 (nombreuses rééditions); trad. esp. 1873-74; trad. ital. 1875.
- Libre examen [version très augmentée de l'Apologie, supra], Paris, 1871; rééditions 1872, 1874, 1877, 1881, 1907.
- Les Merveilles de la sculpture, Paris, Hachette, coll. "La Bibliothèque des merveilles", 1869 (nombreuses rééditions, la 4e en 1886); trad. esp. 1872.
- La Science et la conscience, Librairie de la Bibliothèque démocratique, 1873
- Reasons for Unbelief, translated from the French, with the approval of the author, New York, 1896.
