= Alphonse Duvernoy =

French musician

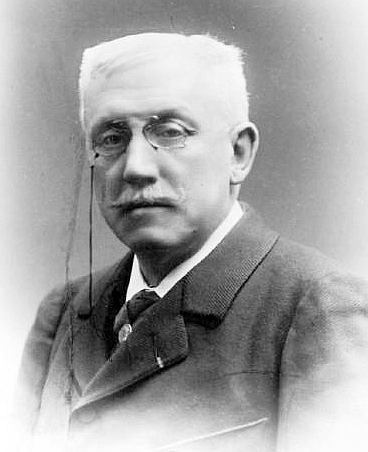
Victor-Alphonse Duvernoy

Victor-Alphonse Duvernoy (pronounced [viktɔʁ alfɔ̃s dyvɛʁnwa]; 30 August 1842 – 7 March 1907) was a French pianist and composer.

== Life and career ==
The son of noted bass-baritone Charles-François Duvernoy (1796–1872), Duvernoy was born in Paris and became a student of Antoine François Marmontel, François Bazin, and Auguste Barbereau at the Conservatoire de Paris, where he studied piano from 1886. He subsequently made his career as a piano virtuoso, a composer and professor of piano at the Conservatoire.

He composed operas, a ballet, symphonic and chamber music works, as well as music for piano. His 1880 symphonic poem La Tempête for soloists, chorus and orchestra after William Shakespeare's The Tempest won the Grand Prix de la Ville de Paris in 1900.

Duvernoy counts composer Alexander Winkler (1865–1935) and Norah Drewett de Kresz (1882–1960) among his students. His brother was singer and pianist Edmond Duvernoy.

He died in Paris.

== Selected works ==
Stage

- Sardanapale, opera in 3 acts (1882, Paris, Concerts Lamoureux); libretto by Pierre Berton after Lord Byron
- Le Baron Frick, operetta-pasticcio in 1 act (1885, Paris); libretto by Ernest Depré and Charles Clairville
- Hellé, opera in 4 acts (1896, Opéra de Paris); libretto by Charles-Louis-Étienne Nuitter and Camille du Locle
- Bacchus, ballet in 3 acts and 5 scenes (26 November 1902, Opéra de Paris); libretto by Georges Hartmann and Joseph Hansen after a poem by Auguste Mermet, choreography by Joseph Hansen

Orchestral

- Hernani, overture (1890)

Concertante

- 2 Fragments symphoniques for piano and orchestra (1876)
- Morceau de concert for piano and orchestra, Op. 20 (1877); dedicated to Mathurin Barbereau
- Scène de bal for piano and orchestra, Op. 28 (1885)
- Fantaisie symphonique for piano and orchestra (1905)

Chamber music

- Piano Trio in E minor, Op. 11 (c.1868)
- Sonata No. 1 for violin and piano, Op. 23 (1885)
- Sérénade for trumpet, 2 violins, viola, cello, double bass and piano, Op. 24 (1906)
- Deux Morceaux for flute and piano, Op. 41 (1898)

1. Lamento
2. Intermezzo

- Concertino for flute and piano (or orchestra), Op. 45 (1899)
- String Quartet in C minor, Op. 46 (1899)
- Lied in A minor for viola and piano, Op. 47 (1901)
- Sonata No. 2 in C minor for violin and piano, Op. 51 (1905)

Piano

- Six pièces (published 1868): Romance sans paroles; Gavotte; Prélude; Poco agitato; Chanson; Étude
- Ballade, Op. 8 No. 1 (published 1872)
- Sérénade, Op. 8 No. 2
- Queen Mab (published 1872)
- Regrets (published 1872)
- Le Message, Caprice (published 1875)
- Cinq Pièces de genre (published 1876)
- Voyage où il vous plaira, 15 Pieces, Op. 21 (published 1879): En route!; Récit; Menuet; Orientale; Conversation; Allegrezza; Promenade; Ischl; Souvenir; Momente de caprice; Chanson; Un soir; Inquiétude; Kilia; Retour
- La Tempête, airs de ballet for piano 4-hands (1881)
- Pensée musicale, Op. 25 (1885)
- Intermède, Op. 26 (1885)
- Scherzetto, Op. 27 (1885)
- Deux Pièces, Op. 35
- Sous bois, Op. 36 (1894)
- Humoresque, Op. 42
- L'École du mécanisme, 100 Études (1903)
- Sonata in A major, Op. 52 (1906)

Choral

- La Tempête, symphonic poem in 3 parts for soloists, chorus and orchestra (1880); words by Armand Silvestre and Pierre Berton after The Tempest by William Shakespeare
- Cléopâtre, scène lyrique for soprano, chorus and orchestra (1885?); words by Louis Gallet

Vocal

- Six Mélodies for voice and piano, Op. 7; Amour (words by Pierre de Ronsard); La Caravane humaine (Théophile Gautier); Romance (Th. Gautier); Les Matelots (Th. Gautier); Soupirs (Sully Prudhomme); La Fuite (Th. Gautier)
- Chanson d'amour for voice and piano (1904), words by Louis Bouilhet
- Douces larmes for voice and piano (1905), words by Paul Gravollet
- Chansons de page for tenor or soprano, words by Stéphane Bordèse

== Bibliography ==
- Adolph Goldberg, Karl Ventzke (et al.): Porträts und Biographien hervorragender Flöten-Virtuosen, -Dilettanten und -Komponisten (Berlin: private print, 1906)
- Paul Frank, Wilhelm Altmann: Kurzgefasstes Tonkünstler Lexikon (Regensburg: Gustav Bosse Verlag, 1936)
- Stanley Sadie (ed.): The New Grove Dictionary of Music and Musicians (London: Macmillan, 1980)
- Lyle G. Wilson: A Dictionary of Pianists (London: Robert Hale, 1985)
