= Le loup-garou =

1827 French opera by Louise Bertin

- Opéra comique by Louise Bertin
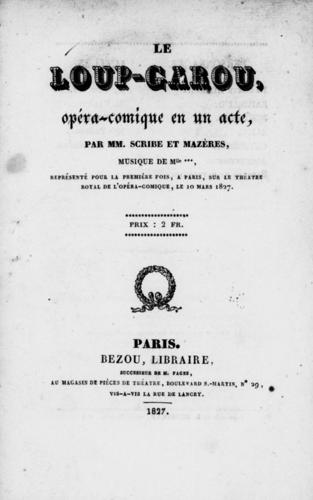
- Title page of the published libretto of Le loup-garou (Paris: Bezou, 1827)
- Translation: The Werewolf
- Librettist: Eugène Scribe; Édouard-Joseph-Ennemond Mazères
- Language: French
- Based on: "Beauty and the Beast"
- Premiere: 10 March 1827; Salle Feydeau (Opéra-Comique), Paris

Le loup-garou (The Werewolf) is a 19th-century opéra comique in one act in French with music by Louise Bertin and a libretto by Eugène Scribe and Édouard-Joseph-Ennemond Mazères. The work is a comedy inspired by the fairy tale of "Beauty and the Beast". It was first performed on March 10, 1827 by the Opéra-Comique in Paris.

The opera was the second of Bertin's four operas and the first to be performed publicly. Scribe was a prolific writer, working on over one-hundred operas, most notably collaborating with Daniel Auber on thirty-nine operas.

== Synopsis ==
Eugène Scribe

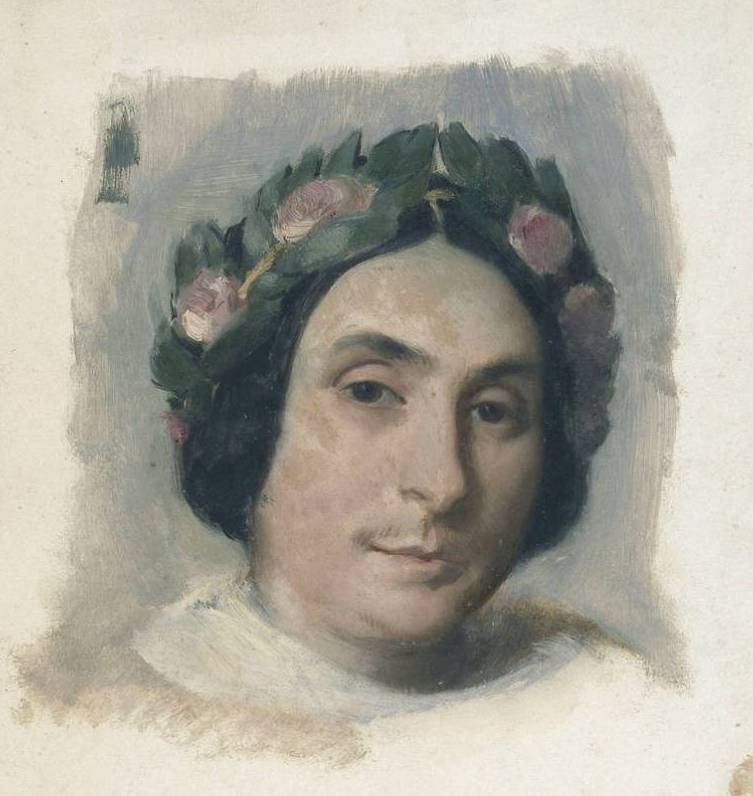
Louise Bertin

In a village in Burgundy in the 15th century, Alice's guardian Raimbaud has arranged for her to marry the falconer Bertrand. Raimbaud works for the Comte Albéric, who has been exiled by the king until he finds a woman who loves him for himself and not his title and wealth. Alice confides to her friend Catherine that she does not love Bertrand but instead loves a stranger, who saved her from drowning in the woods. Alice knows the stranger as "Hubert". Catherine, a young noble-woman, who loves Bertrand, wants Alice to break the engagement. Bertrand, who is superstitious, believes the wolf terrorizing the village is actually a werewolf. When thirteen arrive for dinner, Bertrand is spooked by the number; Catherine goes to find another to join them and returns with Hubert. Raimbaud recognizes "Hubert" is really Albéric. Bertrand thinks Hubert is the werewolf. Alice becomes convinced of this too and rejects Hubert. Catherine then agrees to marry him. Bertrand tells Alice he was enamored with Catherine but felt he was beneath her station. Bertrand and the villagers go to kill the wolf. Hubert appears and Alice fears that he will turn into a werewolf and be killed. Alice tells Hubert she loves him, even if he is a werewolf. Bertrand and the villagers return, having killed the wolf and are surprised to see Hubert alive. Raimbaud reveals Hubert is really the Comte Albéric. Catherine announces her engagement to Bertrand and Alice her betrothal to Albéric.

== 19th century ==
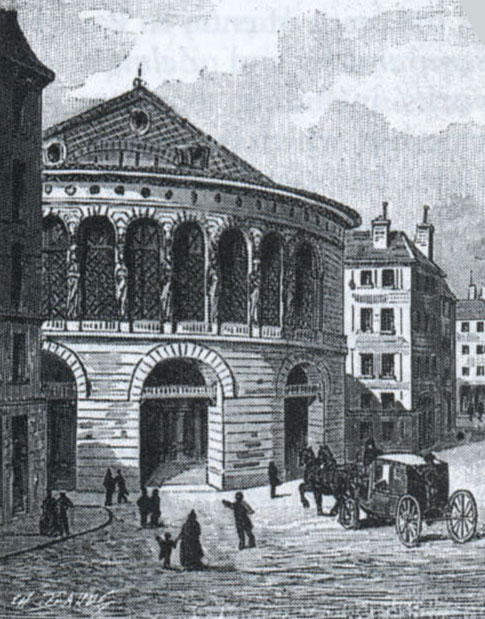
Salle Feydeau, Paris

Le loup-garou was premiered on 10 March 1827, by the Opéra-Comique at the Salle Feydeau in Paris. The first performance was given as a charity benefit for victims of the winter of 1827.

The original cast was Jean-Baptiste Chollet as the Comte Albéric, M. Valère as Raimbaud, Augustin Vizentini as Bertrand, Geneviève-Aimé-Zoë Prévost as Alice, and Marie-Julie Boulanger as Catherine. The leads, Chollet and Prévost, were married in real life and had a daughter who also became an opera singer.

The opera was "brilliantly successful". It received twenty-six performances. Le loup-garou was given in October 1827 in Rouen at the Théâtre des Arts. It was also performed in 1827 at the Théatre Municipal in Lille. The libretto and score were both published the year of the premiere.

The leading Parisian newspaper Journal des débats (which was owned by the composer's father, Louis-François Bertin) wrote that the audience at the first two performances "laughed a lot" and found the music to be graceful, fresh, and original, executed by "the perfect ensemble" of singers. Le Figaro called the plot "implausible and ridiculous" and said the music was "weak and lacks color". The Revue musicale said the audience at the first performance was so rowdy that the opera could not be judged properly; but at the second, the work was a "complete success" which received "lively applause". The opera "gives hope because it is a work of originality". Le Constitutionnel called the opera "pleasant, piquant, witty".

A critic wrote of the music in 2022:

There is a long and pleasant overture ... The melodies are gracious and even memorable ... for the most part fairly simple. The vocal lines are unadorned compared to the contemporary music of Rossini or even composers like Hérold and Auber. There is no doubt, however, that Bertin knew her stuff; the ensembles are clever and well developed. Rossini knew Bertin and she certainly knew many of his operas, but with a couple of exceptions this work does not sound much like Rossini even though the structures can be compared to his short one-act works, most written early in his career ... Bertin, however, has her own voice, her "sound", in the plaintive Romance and elsewhere. It might have been a "sound" that was in a stage of development in 1827 when she was only 22, but it is hers.

== 21st century ==
After "a century-long oblivion", Opera Southwest in September 2022 performed Le loup-garou in the outdoor theatre at the Albuquerque Museum of Art and History in Albuquerque, New Mexico. This was the American premiere and the first staging of the original work since the 19th Century. Denise Boneau, who wrote her Ph.D. dissertation on Bertin, translated the libretto for the production. The cast was Michael Rodriguez as the Comte Albéric, Miguel Pedroza as Raimbaud, Thomas Drew as Bertrand, Yejin Lee as Alice, and Mélanie Ashkar as Catherine.

The first British production of Le loup-garou was given in London by Gothic Opera in October and November 2022 at the Round Chapel in Lower Clapton, Hackney. Gothic Opera presented Bertin's opera on a double-bill with Pauline Viardot's The Last Sorcerer. The cast was Matthew Scott Clark as the Comte Albéric, Ashley Mercer as Raimbaud, Andrew Rawlings as Bertrand, Alice Usher as Alice, and Charlotte Hoather as Catherine.

The overture from Le loup-garou was played by the Paris Chamber Orchestra at Paris's Théâtre des Champs-Elysées on June 23, 2023; three days before, Bertin's third opera Fausto was presented in a concert version at the same venue.

The WholeTone Opera in October 2017 presented an adaptation of the work, The Werewolf: A Freshly Transformed, Fiercely Queer Opera, at The Rockwell in Somerville, Massachusetts. The "modernized libretto" of this version was by J. Deschene and Teri Kowiak with new music by Molly Preston. Nora Maynard, artistic director of the company, said "once we pared it down to its skeleton, we also found some excellent, lyrical vocal and orchestral writing to lay our new story upon", one where "almost all of the main characters in this story identify as queer or gay". One review said the "apparent attempt at an edgy, risky operatic equivalent of The Rocky Horror Picture Show misjudged badly".
