= Perlimpinpin =

Perlimpinpin may refer to:

- La poudre de perlimpinpin, a French-language idiom with a meaning analogous to snake oil.
- Perlimpinpin (song), a song from French singer Barbara (1930–1997).
- Perlimpinpin, a character in the 1867 chamber opera Le dernier sorcier (The Last Sorcerer).
