= Cendrillon (Viardot) =

Chamber operetta with dialogue in three acts by Pauline Viardot

- Chamber operetta by Pauline Viardot
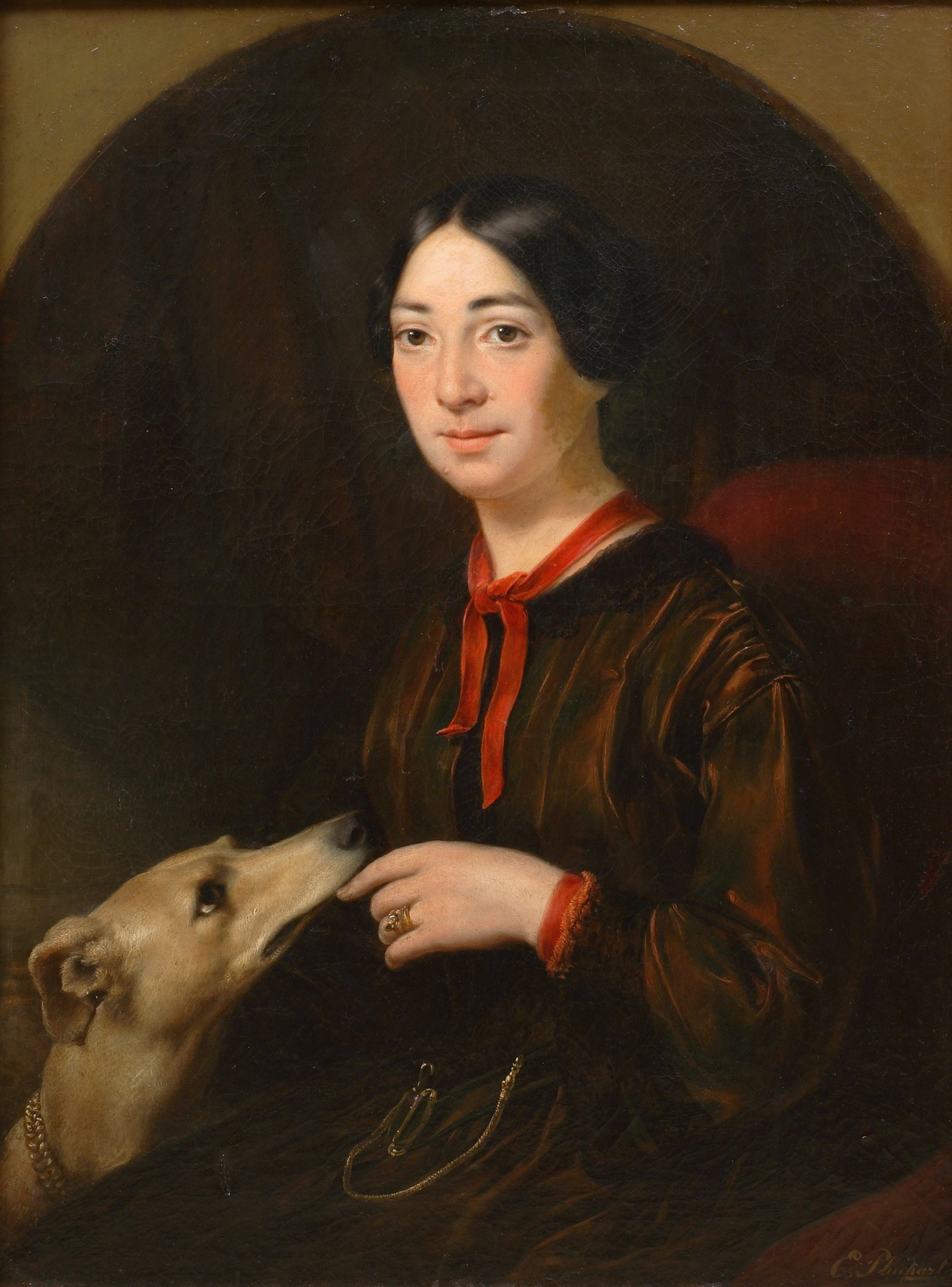
- The composer c. 1853
- Language: French
- Based on: "Cinderella"
- Premiere: 23 April 1904 the composer's salon

Cendrillon is a chamber operetta with dialogue in three acts by Pauline Viardot based on the story of Cinderella. The work, for a cast of seven with piano orchestration, premiered in Viardot's Paris salon on 23 April 1904, when she was 83, and was published later that year. The libretto has been described as "a retelling of the Cinderella story with Gallic wit, Italianate bel canto, and a quirkiness all her [Viardot's] own".

The plot remains relatively faithful to Perrault's original fairy tale, but takes a much more lighthearted approach than the other operatic adaptations by Massenet, Rossini and Isouard. The evil stepmother is replaced with a bumbling and clueless stepfather and the Fairy Godmother (La Fée) actually appears as a guest at the party and entertains the guests with a song. A full performance of the opera lasts a little over an hour.

== Roles ==
Roles, voice types
Role	Voice type
Le Baron de Pictordu	baritone
Marie, called Cendrillon (Cinderella), daughter of Pictordu	soprano
Armelinde, another daughter of Pictordu	mezzo-soprano
Maguelonne, another daughter of Pictordu	soprano
La Fée (fairy godmother)	coloratura soprano
Le Prince Charmant	tenor
Le Comte Barigoule	tenor
Ball guests, ladies, royal footmen	chorus

== Synopsis ==
Time: Early 20th century
Place: France

=== Act 1 ===
Marie (Cendrillon) is the servant in the house of her father, who is a low noble in an alternative reality of France where royalty still existed in 1904. The opera begins with Marie singing what is presumably a folk song (Il etait jadis un prince) about a prince wanting to be married but unable to find a suitable wife, only wanting a princess. A beggar calls at the house asking for food and money, and ironically while Marie is off asking her sisters for money, reveals himself to be none other than the Prince, looking for a wife among common folk. Marie returns without anything from her family, but offers the beggar the few coins she has before Armelinde and Maguelonne enter the living room to shoo away the beggar (Nous sommes assaillis.) Marie responds by asking who would clean the house and take care of the family if she was to leave (Si je n'y venais pas, qui donc le balairait?) stating she should be at least able to sing her song, which she begins to sing again before being interrupted by another knock at the door, by the Prince again who is this time disguised as his Valet, Barigoule, with an invitation to a ball that evening. The sisters accept and go off to prepare themselves (Je serai charmante.)

Marie thinks about the Valet who she describes as having a "charm so distinct" while Pictordu wakes up in a bathrobe. Marie attempts to greet him as "papa" while he simply rebuffs her by calling her "child". The sisters call Marie away while Baron comments that he isn't feeling well, explaining that he saw a van driving around that reminded him of the time before he was a baron, while he worked as a greengrocer (Hier je vis circuler une voiture immense) also noting a jail sentence 20 years ago, a past love name Gothon, and "vive la France!" The sisters return after Baron's aria, explaining the invitation to the ball and encouraging their father to get ready (reprise of Je serai charmante.) Maguelonne teases Marie about not being able to attend the ball to which she responds that all she wants is to be loved by her family (Cheres soeurs.)

After the Baron, Maguelonne and Armalinde leave, Marie begins singing her song again, noting how much she wanted to see the Valet again, calling the attention of her fairy godmother (La Fee) who arrives to send Marie to the ball (Je viens te rendre a l'esperance.) Staying relatively faithful to the original fairy-tale la Fee turns a pumpkin into a carriage, mice into horses, lizards into footmen, and a rat into a coachman. Marie's godmother reminds her to be back by midnight or the spell would break, while giving her slippers (not specified as glass in this adaptation) and a magic veil that will turn her rags into a beautiful gown. La Fee sends her goddaughter on her way, and then heads to the ball herself.

=== Act 2 ===
Back at the palace, the Prince and Barigoule have switched roles again for the evening – and Barigoule sings about how happy he is get to be the Prince (Puisque me voila Prince.) The Pictordu family (minus Marie) then arrives and introduces themselves to Barigoule throughout a series of entrees. As the Barigoule attempts to whisk off Maguelonne and Armalinde off to see "his" treasures, the Prince notices another woman needing to be formally introduced. The crowd is taken aback by her beauty (Quelle est cette belle inconnue?) before the Prince realizes it is the woman he fell in love with as a beggar and Marie recognizing the Prince as the charming man singing a semi-duet over the crowd. After the Prince and crowd regain their composure, Barigoule proposes a song, both sisters comment that there are too many people to sing, but La Fee responds "absolutely" and sings a song. The score specifies that this can be any song of the singer or director's choosing (and is omitted in some performances). In many performances of the opera, Viardot's vocal adaptations of Chopin Mazurkas are used, particularly La Fete (The Festival) which ironically talks about a village getting ready for a ball. After the performance by La Fee, Barigoule then asks the ladies to dance to which the crowd asks for a minuet. After the dance, the entire crowd leaves for the buffet, while Marie and the Prince have a moment alone (C'est moi, ne craignez rien!) At the end of the duet, the two share a kiss before Marie realizes that midnight has come and leaves abruptly leaving behind a slipper, while the guests sing a rousing (and implicitly drunken) song about roses (La belle fille, toi qui vends des roses.)

=== Act 3 ===
Baron Pictordu awakens in his own house commenting that the Prince (rather, who he thought was the prince) had a remarkable resemblance to someone he once knew. Barigoule arrives thinking the same thing, and revealing that he actually isn't the Prince and that he used to work with Pictordu when he was a greengrocer. They reminisce on their past line of work and their shared love interest Gorthon (Votre altesse me fait l'honneur). Barigoule brings word that the Prince is looking for the lady at the ball who left her slipper, so that he might marry her. The sisters, upon hearing this, revel in their excitement (Quelle drôle d'aventure.) Barigoule hears the Prince's royal march in the distance and the Prince with his footman arrive (Silence!.) The Prince, now actually as himself, thanks the ladies for responding to his appeal, and directs Barigoule to begin trying the slipper on each one. The slipper fits neither of the sisters, at which the Prince decides that the mysterious lady wasn't from this home and starts to leave, but not before Barigoule remembers that there were three ladies from the house of Pictordu. The Prince questions Amalinde and Maguelonne about this and it is revealed that the third sister is in the kitchen. The Prince orders Barigoule to find the other sister and try the slipper on her. Marie is brought into the room, and of course, the slipper is a perfect fit. The Prince immediately asks Marie to marry him, and her family asks her to forgive them for how they treated her. La Fee returns to give her well wishes to the new couple, bidding them to be happy (Je viens pour la dernière fois) while the crowd sings about how delirious joyful and bubbling over in love the new couple is (Finale: De leur bonheur.) The curtain closes with Marie and the Prince kissing, about to live happily ever after....

== Productions ==
Although not performed frequently during the 20th century, in the past few years there have been several professional productions of Cendrillon, at the Caramoor International Music Festival as well as by the Lyric Opera of Los Angeles, both in 2004. Cendrillon has also gained popularity as a collegiate production, perhaps due to its vocal accessibility, light instrumental requirements, and very flexible staging. Recent college productions include a 2007 Cornell University presentation in English and a French performance by La Sierra University in 2008. Ithaca College also presented a production in 2009 as part of a double bill with Maurice Ravel's L'enfant et les sortilèges. In Baden-Baden, where Pauline Viardot lived during some of her later years, the local theatre adapted a version of Cendrillon for its 150-year jubilee. Cendrillon was staged for its Canadian debut in St. Eustache as part of the Festival Opera de St-Eustache in 2015.

The opera was performed a few times in the UK in the 1980s and 1990s, for example in 1980 (as Cinderella) by Harrow Opera Workshop (now Harrow Opera).

The Northern Opera Group produced an award-winning 2020 film adaptation. The work has since been performed in the UK by companies including Opera North, Buxton Festival, Dorset Opera, Opera on Location, and Guildhall School.

The work had its Irish premiere on October 22, 2017, in a production by North Dublin Opera in Dlr Mill Theatre Dundrum, Dublin. It was presented at the 2019 Wexford Festival Opera with Isolde Roxby in the title role. It will be performed professionally by Wolf Trap Opera in the summer of 2021 at the Filene Center.

== Notable arias and selections ==
- "Il était jadis un Prince" (There once was a prince) Air: Cendrillon in act 1 – this aria forms Cendrillon's leitmotif.
- "Je serai charmante, toujours elegante" (I will be charming, always elegant) Trio: The sisters and Cendrillon in act 1, recurs in later thematic material.
- "Je viens te rendre à l'espérance" (I come to help you) Air: La Fée in act 1 – comprises La Fée's leitmotif.
- "C'est moi ne craignez rien!" (It's me, don't worry!) Love duet between Le Prince and Cendrillon in act 2 – Viardot used the same aria in her earlier opera, Le dernier sorcier, which premiered in 1869, as the love duet between Stella and Lelio. Some people find similarities between the opening of this aria and "Elle a fui, la tourtelle", from Jacques Offenbach's The Tales of Hoffmann, but as that opera premiered in 1881, and Viardot wrote this music before 1869, it is impossible for Viardot to have been influenced by Offenbach.

== Recordings ==
- Cendrillon by Pauline Viardot. André Cognet (baritone) Pictordu; Sandrine Piau (soprano) Cendrillon; Jean Rigby (mezzo) Armelinde; Susannah Waters (soprano) Maguelonne; Elizabeth Vidal (soprano) La Fée; Jean-Luc Viala (tenor) Prince Charmant; Paul Austin Kelly (tenor) Barigoule. With the Geoffrey Mitchell Choir and Nicholas Kok, pianist and conductor. Recorded at Rosslyn Hill Chapel, Hampstead, London in 2000. Opera Rara ORR 212.
