= Birgit Stauch =

German sculptor

Birgit Stauch (born December 11, 1961, in Baden-Baden, West Germany) is a contemporary German sculptor who works in bronzes, sculptures, sketches and portraits.

== Life ==
Stauch was born in Baden-Baden, Baden-Württemberg, daughter of artist and sculptor, Alexander Stauch. Upon returning from compulsory service during World War II her father studied stone carving as a profession and sculpture as a passion thus inspiring his daughter to follow in his footsteps.

She studied design at the Johann Friedrich Böttger Institute in Selb, Bavaria. She furthered her education as an understudy of Arno Breker (1900–1991) and sculptor Rudolf Alexander Agricola (1912–1990). Stauch also studied drawing under Clarissa Kupferberg (1907–1989). She worked as a creative director in the atelier at Strassackers', Europes' largest art foundry for some 14 years. Returning to Baden-Baden she took over her fathers' stonemasonry business as managing director all the while continuing to create a broad variety of works in addition to teaching sculpture.

== Works ==
Her works include a wide variety of sketches, drawings, stone and bronze sculptures, bronze reliefs, busts such as Käthe Kollwitz, portals, bronze coat of arms, miscellaneous works as well as commissioned pieces.

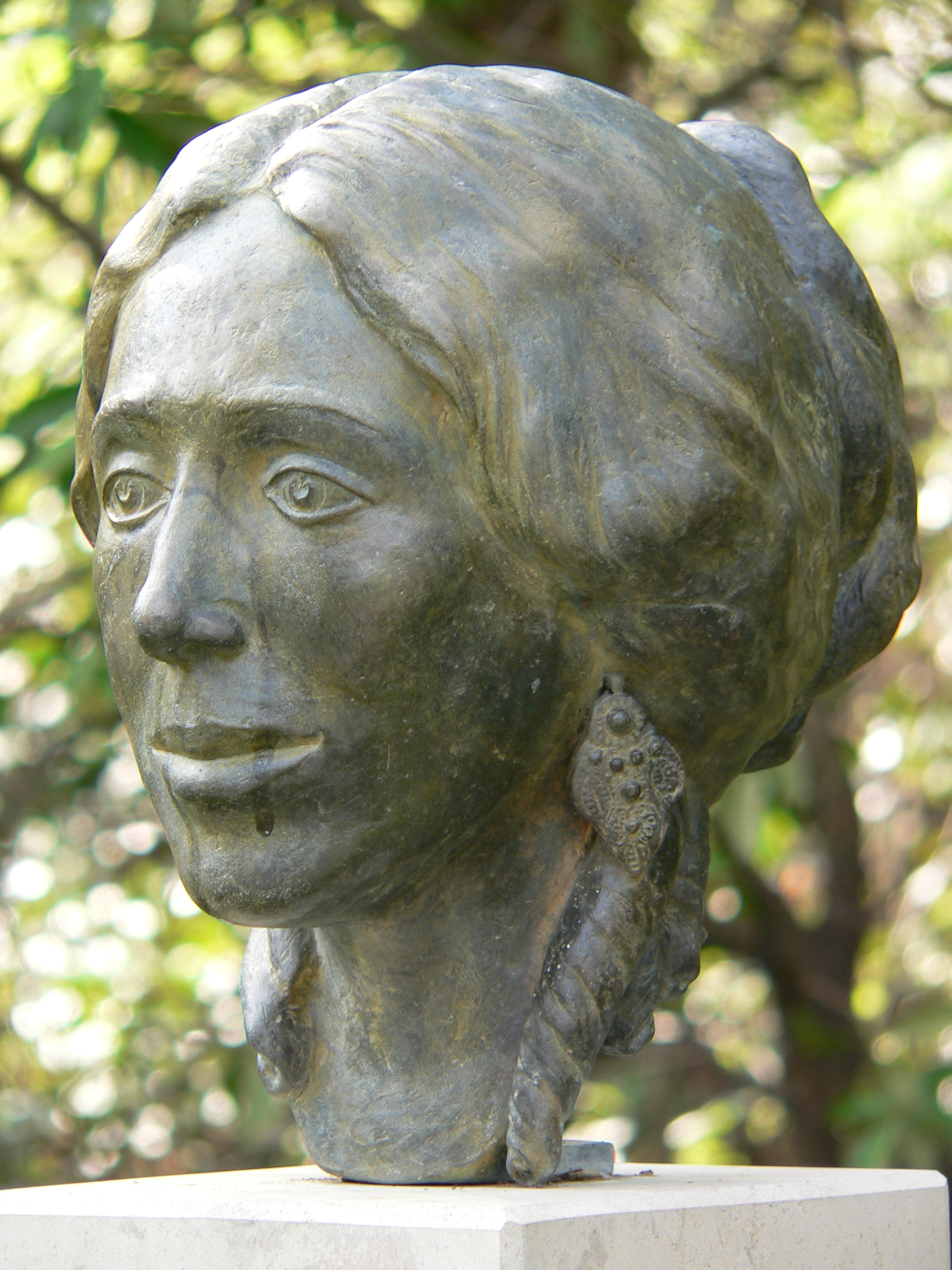
Pauline Viardot 2004 Baden-Baden

Stauch created a holocaust memorial commemorating the deportation of 450 Jews from Freiburg to the concentration camp at Gurs, in France, close to the Spanish border on October 22, 1940. Gurs was considered to be a transit point for detainees in transit to Auschwitz.

=== Public monuments ===
- Till Eulenspiegel, Water Work, Baden-Baden 1986
- Memorial, "17. June", Baden-Baden 1989
- "Monk" Sandstone, Bad Herrenalb 1991
- Public Fountains, Rastatt Rauental 1992, 2002
- Public Fountain, Sandweier 1994
- Public Fountain, Giengen an der Brenz 1996
- Public Foutain Weyhr 1999
- Memorial for "Peace, Freedom and Friendship in Europe" Baden-Baden 2007

=== Bronze portals ===
- Government Palace of the Emir of Qatar 1986
- Schmalbach water reservoir 1992
- Annaberg water reservoir 1998
