= Bernard-Romain Julien =

French painter

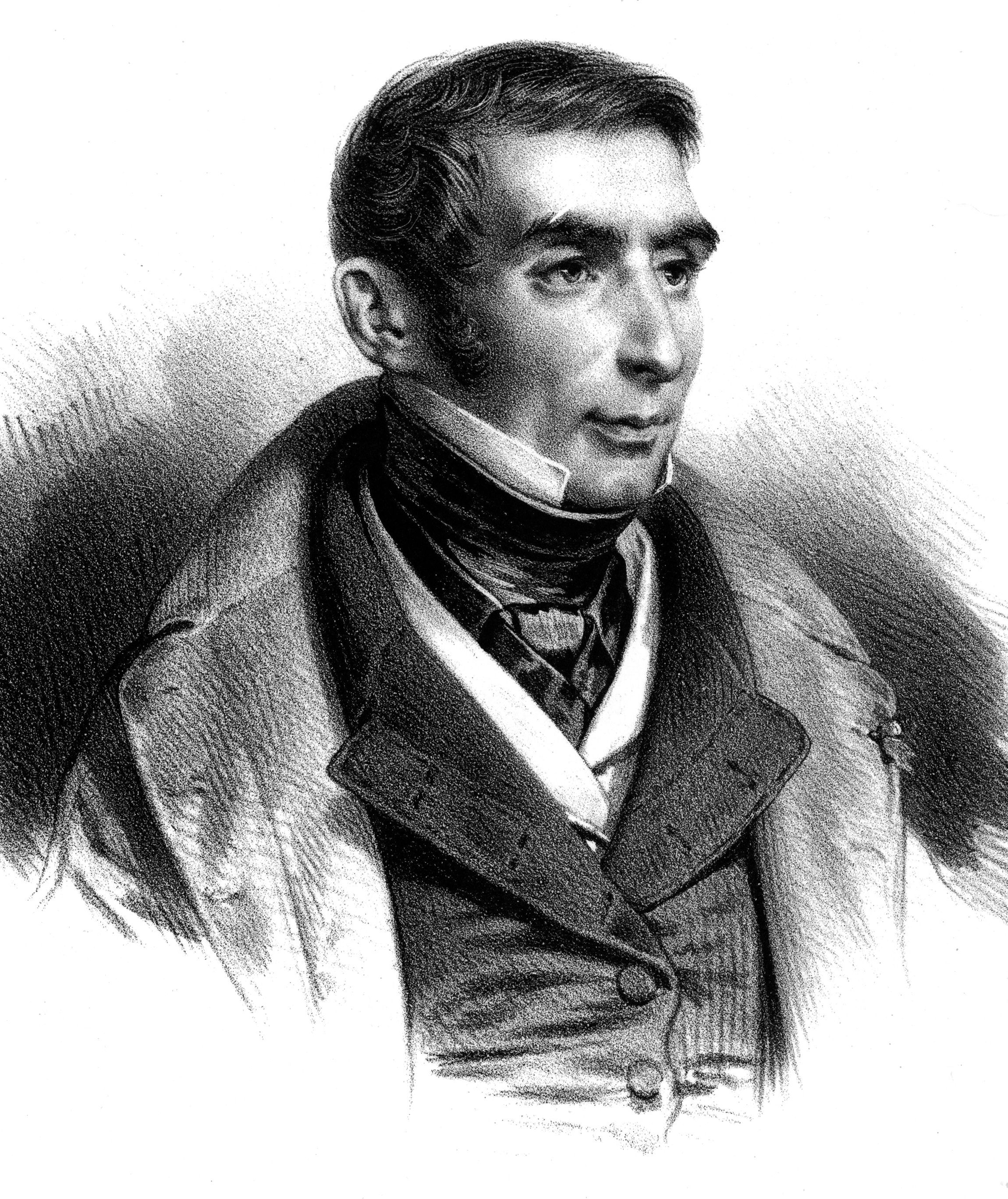
Julien, Eugène Scribe, print

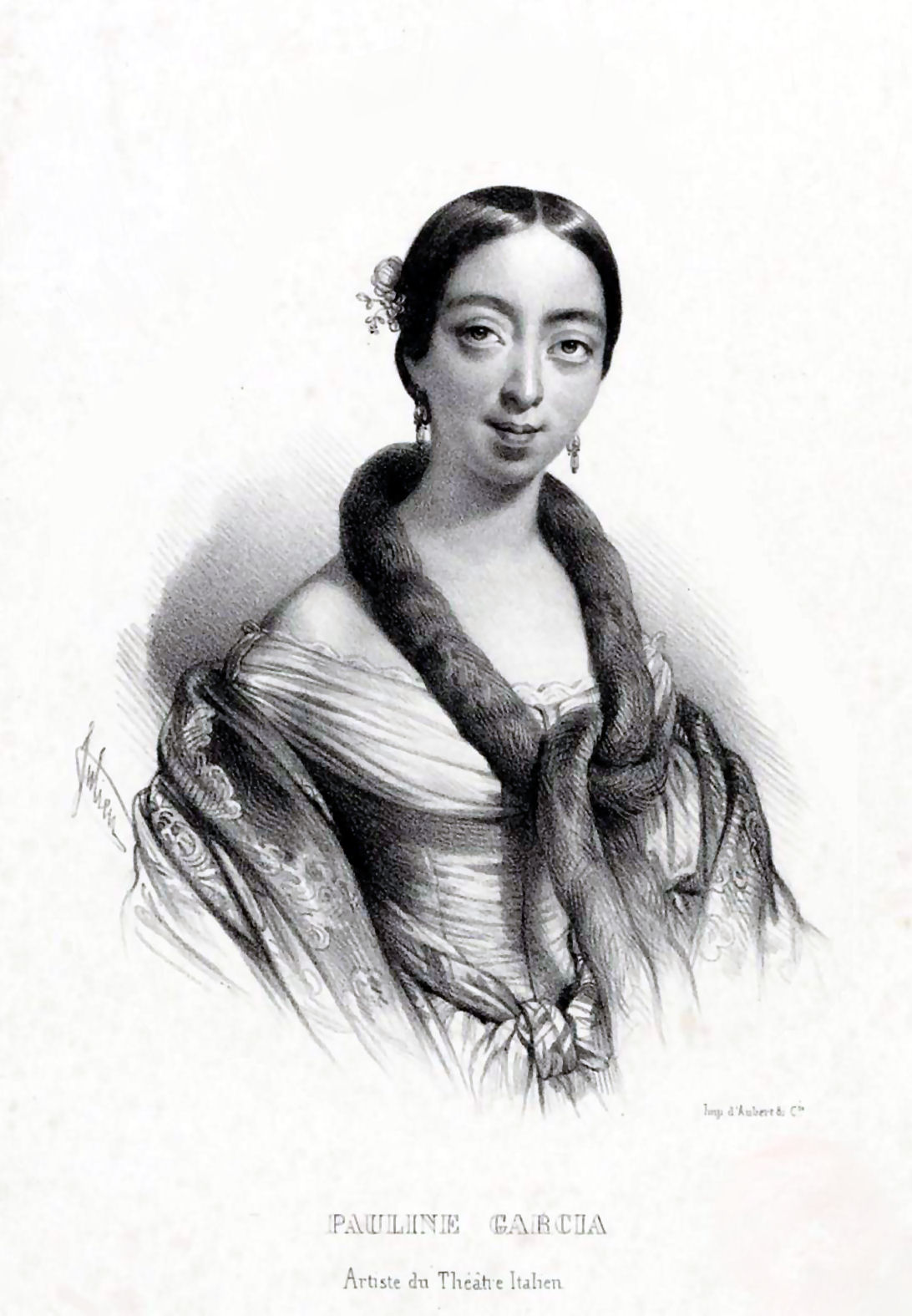
Julien, Pauline Viardot, print

Bernard Romain Julien or Bernard-Romain Julien (16 November 1802 – 3 December 1871) was a French printmaker, lithographer, painter and draughtsman.

== Life ==
Julien was born on 16 November 1802 in Bayonne. He was trained to draw in his home town between 1815 and 1818 before moving to Paris, where he studied painting from 1822 onwards under Antoine-Jean Gros at the École des Beaux-Arts.

He exhibited some paintings and drawings at the Paris Salon between 1833 and 1850, but principally showed lithographs, for which he was known. He produced lithographs of other artists, like George Henry Hall's Cours de Dessin. In 1840, he published Étude à deux crayons ("Study in deux crayons").

In "Landor's Cottage", Edgar Allan Poe describes Julien's work, "One of these drawings was a scene of Oriental luxury, or rather voluptuousness; another was a carnival piece, spirited beyond compare; the third was a Greek female head—a face so divinely beautiful, and yet of an expression so provokingly indeterminate, never before arrested my attention."

In 1854, he made a full-bust portrait of George Washington, after Gilbert Stuart, and the lithograph is in the art collection of Mount Vernon. He returned to his hometown in 1866 and taught drawing there until his death on 3 December 1871.
