= Eugène Pluchart =

Russian painter (1809 – c. 1880)

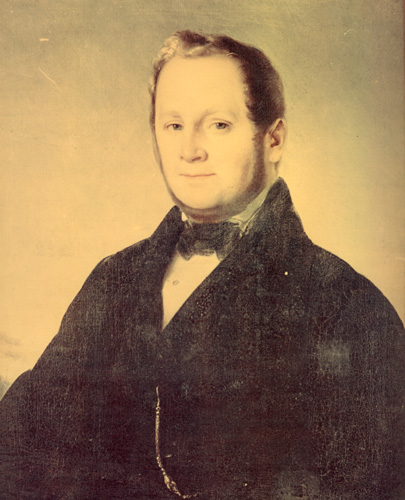
Self-portrait (date unknown)

Eugène Pluchart (Russian: Евгений Александрович Плюшар, romanized: Yevgeny Aleksandrovich Plyushar; 1809, Saint Petersburg - c. 1880, Dresden) was a Russian painter and photographer of French descent.

== Biography ==
His father, Alexandre Pluchart, was a typographer, originally from Valenciennes, who moved to Russia in 1805; becoming Director of publications for the Collegium of Foreign Affairs. His mother, Sophie Henrietta, née Wagner (1782–1857), was German. His older brother, Adolphe, also went into the publishing business.

He began his artistic studies in 1825, at the Beaux-Arts de Paris, with Louis Hersent. This was followed by a study trip to Italy. From 1828 to 1832, he studied at the Academy of Fine Arts, Munich, then returned to Russia. His painting of an odalisque earned him the title of "Academician Candidate" from the Imperial Academy of Arts in 1836. Three years later, he became a full Academician for his portrait of the composer and violinist, Karol Lipiński.

From 1840 to 1842, he lived in Moscow, where he was a professor at the Noble Institute. He specialized in portraits of well-known personalities, predominantly female, but also created a number of frescoes at Saint Isaac's Cathedral in the 1840s.

During the 1850s, he operated a photography studio. He left Russia sometime between 1860 and 1862, and settled in Dresden; his mother's home town. Not long after, he briefly considered returning to Saint Petersburg, to repair his frescoes, which had been damaged by dampness, but chose not to. Very little is known of his later years.

== Selected paintings ==
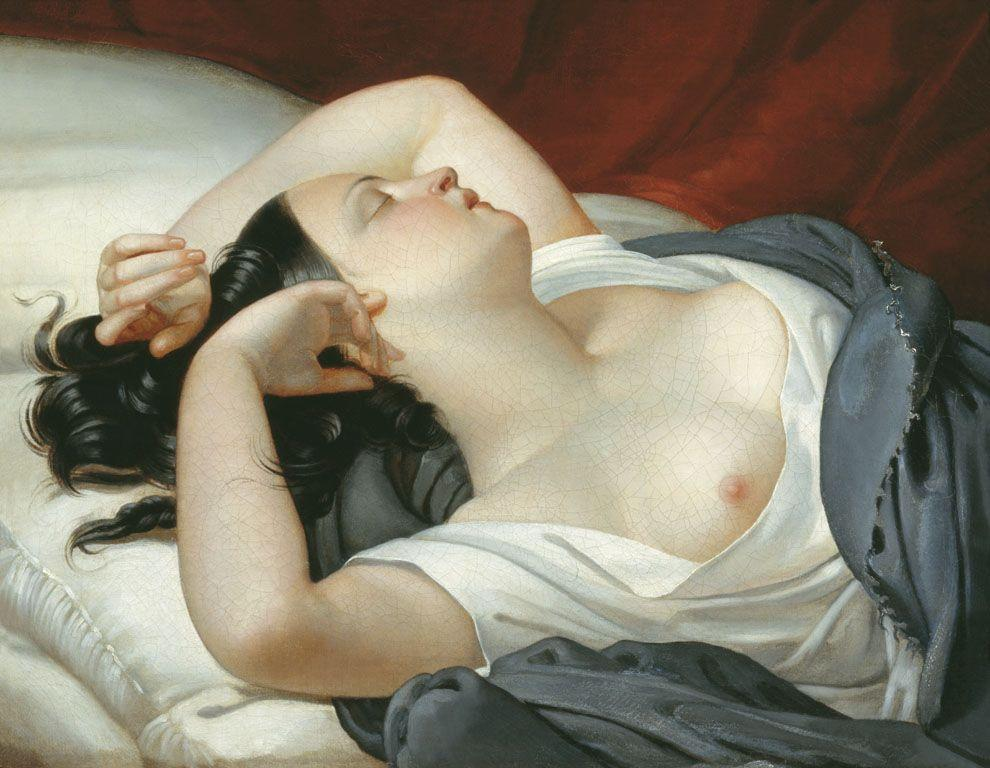
Sleeping Italian

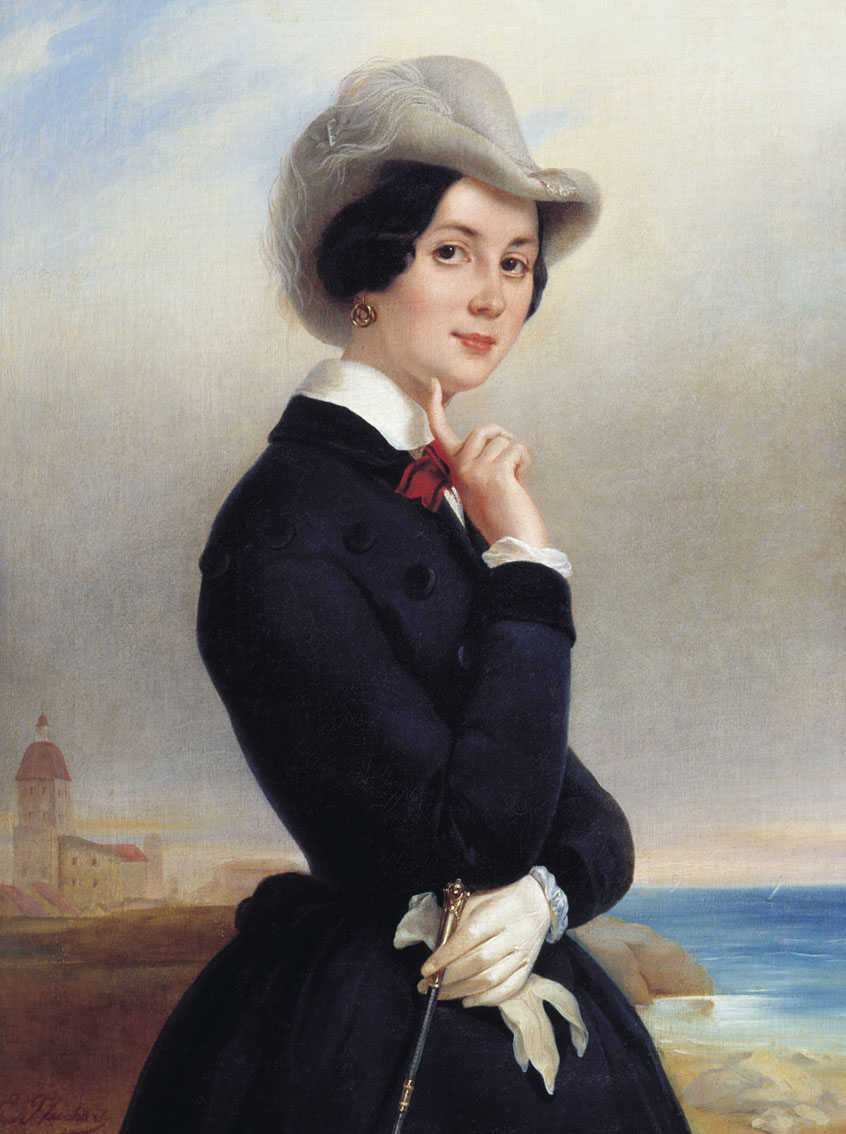
The actress,
Vera Samoylova

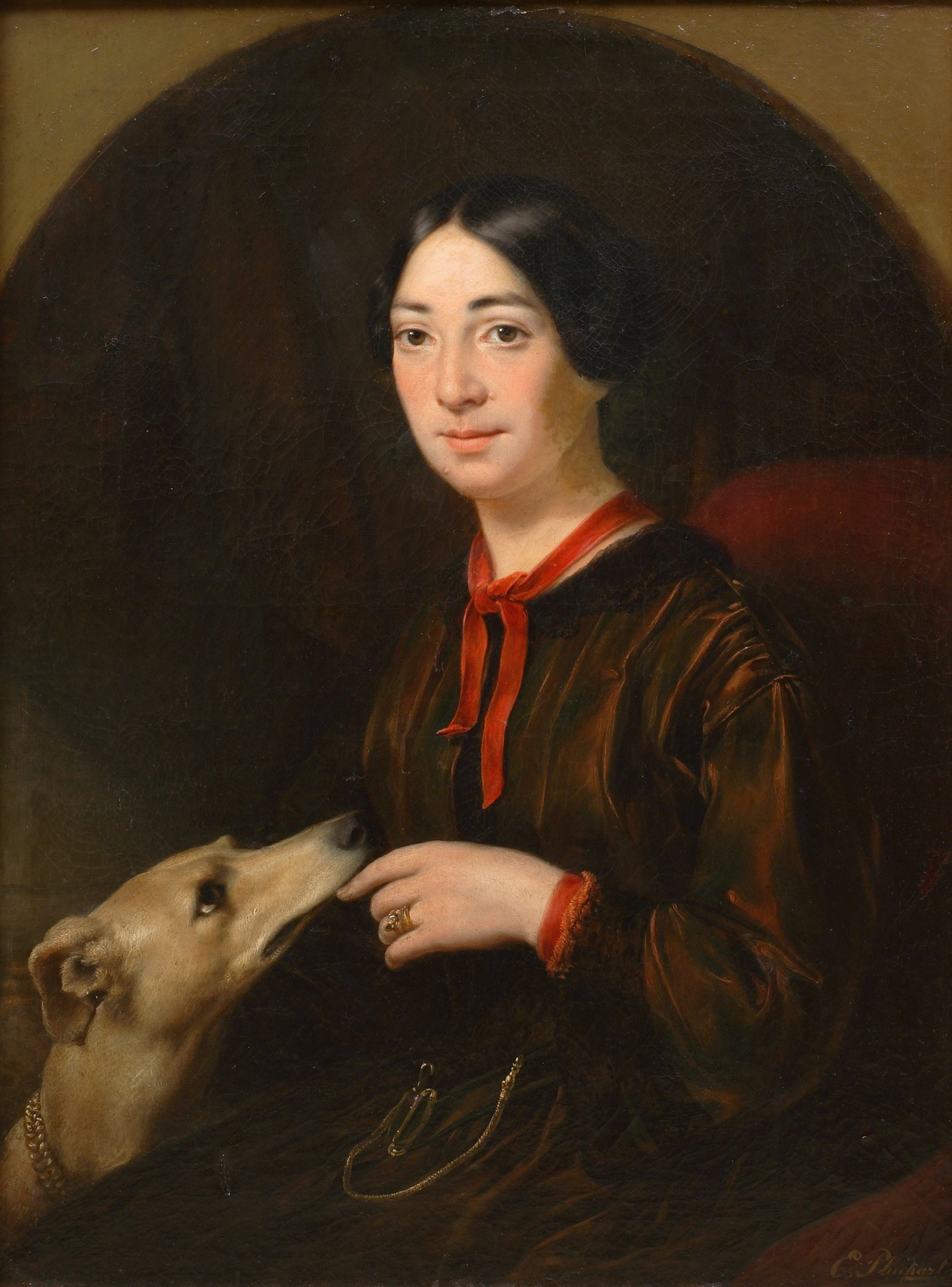
The singer,
Pauline Viardot

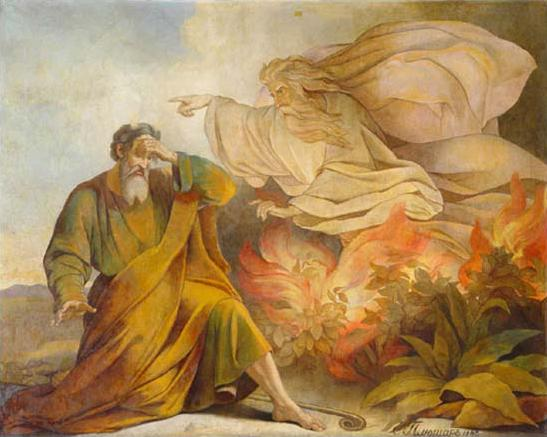
God Appears to Moses
in the Burning Bush

== Sources ==
- Biography from the Русский биографический словарь @ Russian Wikisource
- S N. Коndakov, Юбилейный справочник Императорской Академии художеств. 1764-1914 (Jubilee Handbook of the Imperial Academy of Arts), Товарищество Р. Голике и А. Вильборг, 1915
- Brief biography @ the Saint Isaac's Cathedral website
- "Pluchart, Jewgenij [Eugène] Alexandrowitsch". In: Hans Vollmer (Ed.): Allgemeines Lexikon der Bildenden Künstler von der Antike bis zur Gegenwart, Vol.27: Piermaria–Ramsdell. E. A. Seemann, Leipzig 1933, pg.160
