= Pauline Viardot =

French mezzo-soprano (1821–1910)

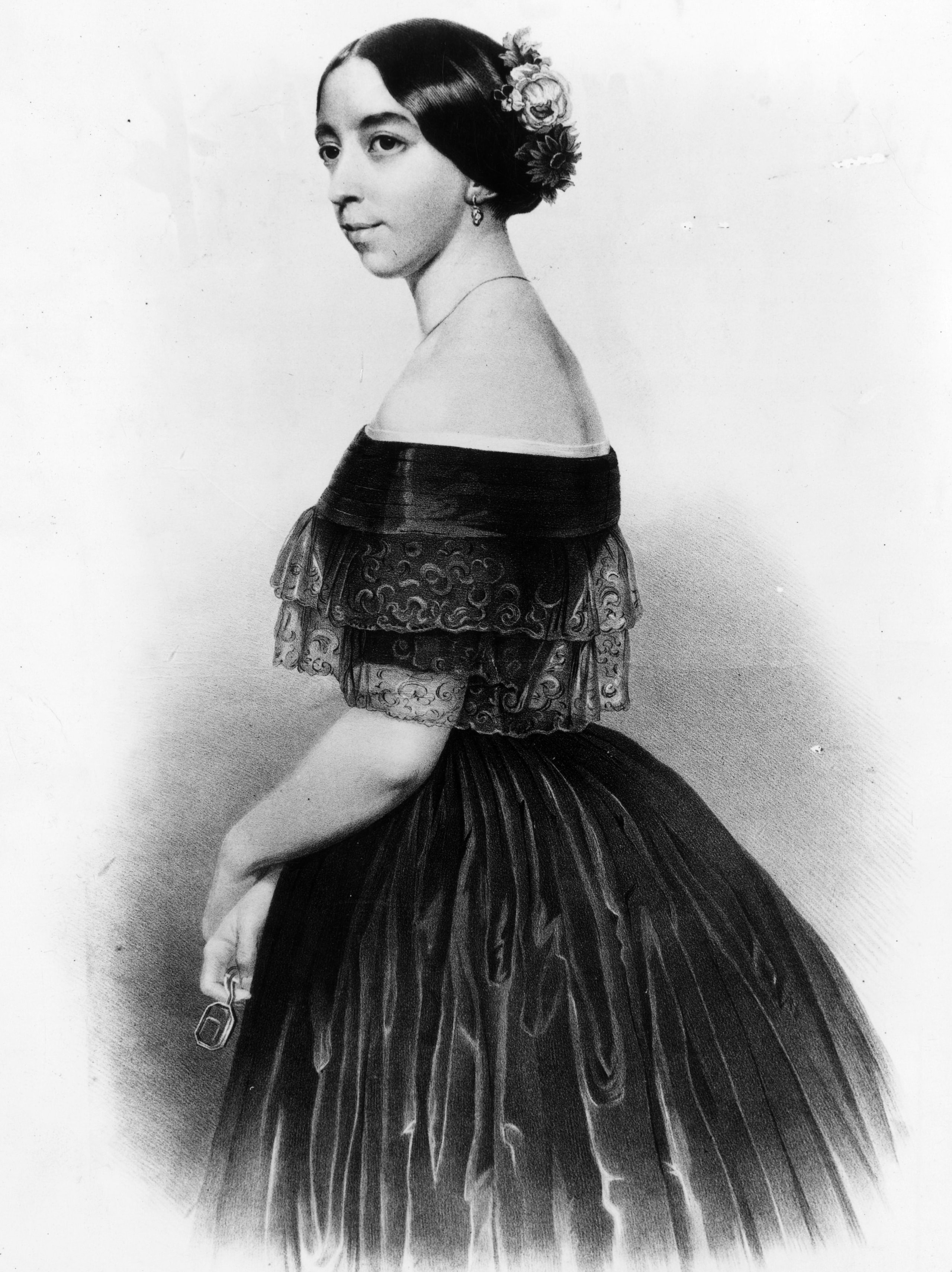
- Viardot, c. 1845
- Born: Michelle Ferdinande Pauline García; 18 July 1821; Paris, France
- Died: 18 May 1910 (aged 88); Paris, France
- Occupations: Operatic dramatic mezzo-soprano; music pedagogue; composer

Pauline Viardot (pronounced [po.lin vjaʁ.do]; 18 July 1821 – 18 May 1910) was a French dramatic mezzo-soprano, composer and pedagogue of Spanish descent. Born Michelle Ferdinande Pauline García, she came from a musical family and took up music at a young age. She began performing as a teenager and had a long and illustrious career as a star performer.

== Name ==
Her name appears in various forms. When it is not simply "Pauline Viardot", it most commonly appears in association with her maiden name García or the unaccented form, Garcia. This name sometimes precedes Viardot and sometimes follows it. Sometimes the words are hyphenated; sometimes they are not. She achieved initial fame as "Pauline García"; the accent was dropped at some point, but exactly when is not clear. After her marriage, she referred to herself simply as "Mme Viardot".

== Early life ==
Michelle Ferdinande Pauline García Sitches was born in Paris. Her father, Manuel, a tenor, was a Spanish singing teacher, composer and impresario. Her mother was Joaquina Sitches, a Spanish actress and operatic singer. Her godparents were Ferdinando Paer and Princess Pauline Galitsin, who provided her with her middle names. She was 13 years younger than her sister, Maria Malibran, a highly acclaimed and famous diva. Her father trained her on the piano and also gave her singing lessons.

As a little girl, she travelled with her family to London, New York City (where her father, mother, brother and sister gave the first full performance of Mozart's Don Giovanni in the United States, in the presence of the librettist, Lorenzo Da Ponte) and Mexico City, where she started her musical career.

By the age of six she was fluent in Spanish, French, English, and Italian. Later in her career, she sang Russian arias so well that she was taken for a native speaker. After her father's death in 1832, her mother, soprano Joaquina Sitches, took over her singing lessons, and forced her to focus her attention on her voice and away from the piano. She had wanted to become a professional concert pianist. She had taken piano lessons with the young Franz Liszt and counterpoint and harmony classes with Anton Reicha, the teacher of Liszt and Hector Berlioz and friend of Ludwig van Beethoven. It was with the greatest regret that she abandoned her strong vocation for the piano, which she did only because she did not dare to disobey her mother's wishes.

She remained an outstanding pianist all her life, and often played duets with her friend Frédéric Chopin, who approved of her arranging some of his mazurkas as songs, and even assisted her in this. Liszt, Ignaz Moscheles, Adolphe Adam, Camille Saint-Saëns and others have left accounts of her excellent piano playing.

After Malibran's death in 1836, aged 28, Pauline became a professional singer, with a vocal range from C3 to F6. However, her professional debut as a musician was as a pianist, accompanying her brother-in-law, the violinist Charles Auguste de Bériot.

== Career ==
Viardot as Valentina and Marietta Alboni as Urbano in Act 1 of Meyerbeer's Gli Ugonotti. Royal Italian Opera (Covent Garden) (1848) (lithograph by John Brandard)

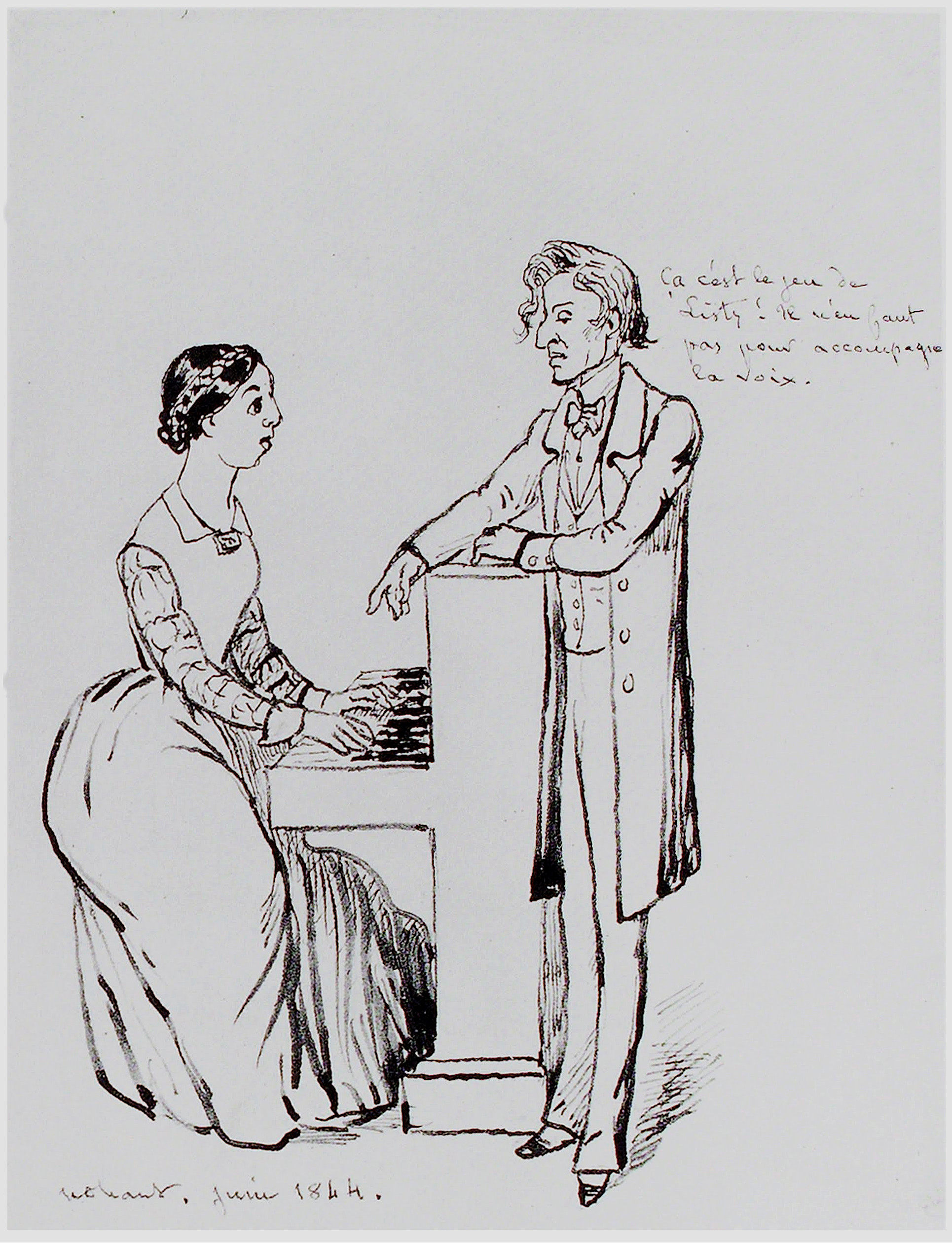
Pauline Viardot at the piano listening to Frédéric Chopin. Sketch

In 1837, 16-year-old Pauline García gave her first concert performance in Brussels. She made her opera debut as Desdemona in Rossini's Otello in London in 1839. This proved to be the surprise of the season. Despite her flaws, she had an exquisite vocal technique combined with an astonishing degree of passion.

At the age of 17, she met and was courted by the famous French romantic poet Alfred de Musset, who had earlier been taken with her sister Maria Malibran. Some sources say he asked for Pauline's hand in marriage, but she declined. However, she remained on good terms with him for many years. Her friend George Sand (who later based the heroine of her 1843 novel Consuelo on her) had a role in discouraging her from accepting de Musset's proposal, directing her instead to Louis Viardot (1800–1883).

Viardot, an author and the director of the Théâtre Italien and twenty-one years Pauline's senior, was financially secure and would be able to provide Pauline with much more stability than de Musset. The marriage took place on 18 April 1840. He was 39 or 40, she 18. He was devoted to her and became the manager of her career. Her children followed in her musical footsteps. Her son Paul became a concert violinist, her daughter Louise Héritte-Viardot became a composer and writer, and two other daughters became concert singers.

Her marriage did not stop the steady stream of infatuated men. The Russian novelist Ivan Turgenev in particular fell passionately in love with her after hearing her rendition of The Barber of Seville in Russia in 1843. In 1845, he left Russia to follow Pauline and eventually installed himself in the Viardot household, treated her four children as his own, and adored her until he died. She, in turn, critiqued his work and through her connections and social abilities, presented him in the best light whenever they were in public. The exact status of their relationship is a matter of debate. Other men closely linked to her included the composers Charles Gounod (she created the title role in his opera Sapho) and Hector Berlioz (who initially had her in mind for the role of Dido in Les Troyens, but changed his mind, which led to a cooling of his relations with the Viardots).

Renowned for her wide vocal range and her dramatic roles on stage, Viardot gave performances that inspired composers such as Frédéric Chopin, Berlioz, Camille Saint-Saëns (who dedicated Samson and Delilah to her, and wanted her to sing the title role, but she declined on account of her age), and Giacomo Meyerbeer, for whom she created Fidès in Le prophète.

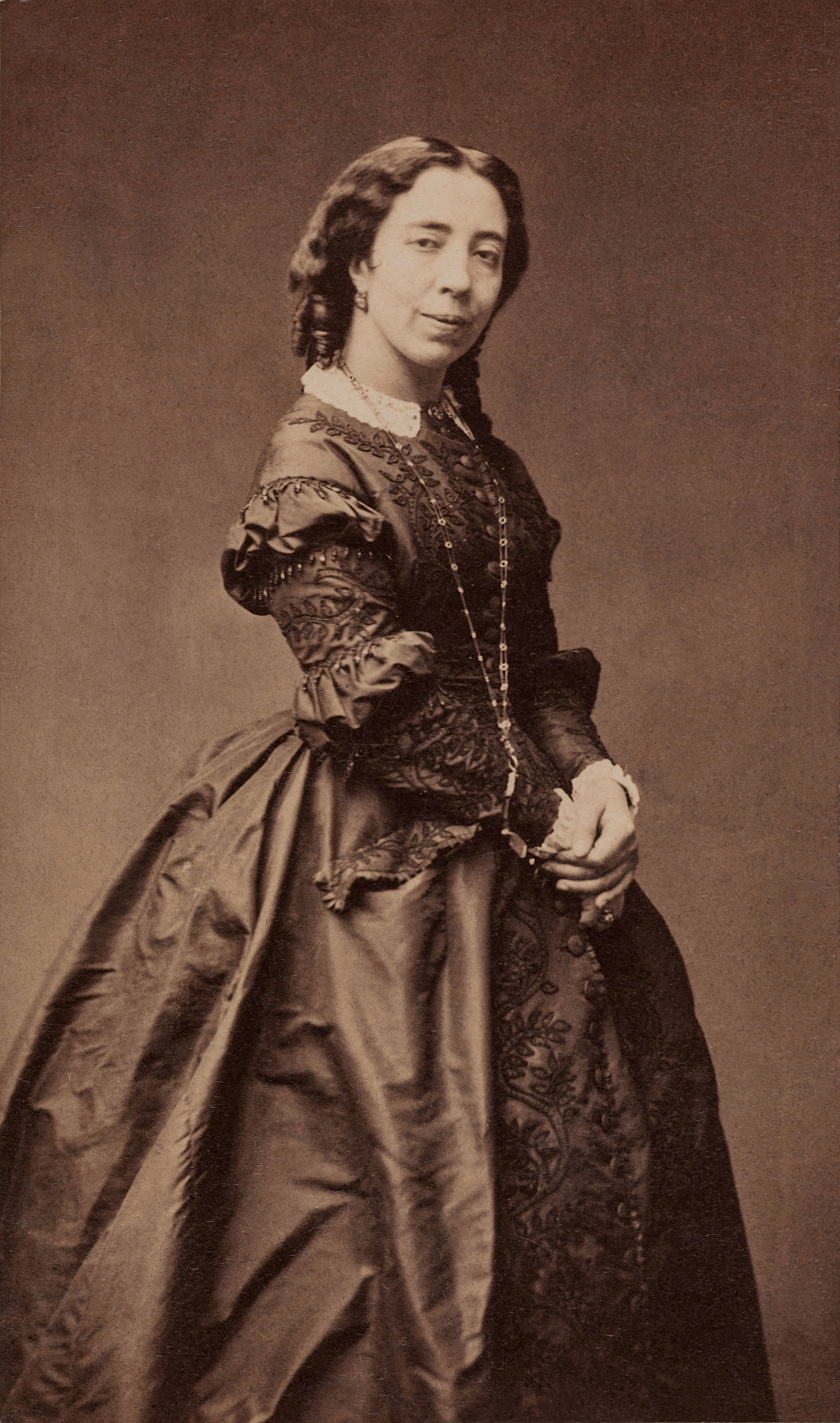
Pauline Viardot

She spoke fluent Spanish, French, Italian, English, German, and Russian, and composed songs in a variety of national techniques. Her career took her to the best music halls across Europe, and from 1843 to 1846 she was permanently attached to the Opera in Saint Petersburg, Russia.

She spent many happy hours at George Sand's home at Nohant, with Sand and her partner Frédéric Chopin. She was given expert advice by Chopin on her piano playing, her vocal compositions, and her arrangements of some of his mazurkas as songs. He in turn derived from her some firsthand knowledge about Spanish music. In July 1847, Sand's and Chopin's relationship came to an end. Viardot tried to heal the rift and get the two back together, but to no avail.

She arranged instrumental works by Joseph Haydn, Franz Schubert and Johannes Brahms as songs. She was the mezzo-soprano in the Tuba mirum movement of Mozart's Requiem at Chopin's funeral at Église de la Madeleine in Paris on 30 October 1849, which she performed together with a soprano, incognito behind a black curtain.

She sang the title role of Gluck's opera Orphée et Eurydice at Théâtre Lyrique in Paris in November 1859, directed by Hector Berlioz who arranged the opera, and she sang this role over 150 times. She was well acquainted with Jenny Lind, the Swedish soprano and philanthropist, who had been a student of her brother.

A notable remark of hers was made to the English soprano Adelaide Kemble when they attended the late concert in London by the great Italian soprano Giuditta Pasta, who was clearly past her prime. Asked by Kemble what she thought of the voice, she replied 'Ah! It is a ruin, but then so is Leonardo's Last Supper'.

In 1863, Pauline Viardot retired from the stage. She and her family left France due to her husband's public opposition to Emperor Napoleon III and settled in Baden-Baden, Germany. In 1870, however, Johannes Brahms persuaded her to sing in the first public performance of his Alto Rhapsody, at Jena.

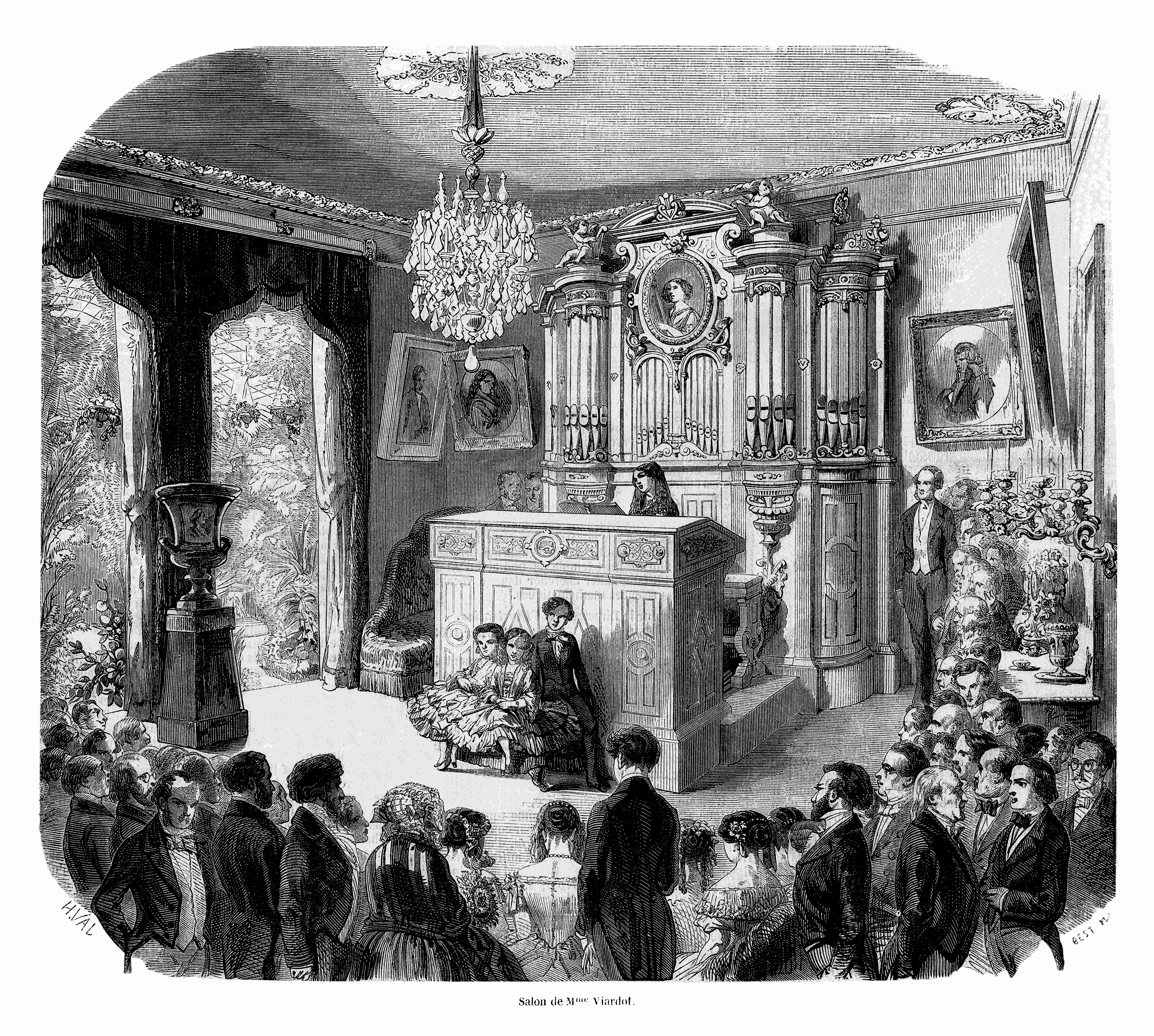
Salon of M^{me} Viardot, article from L'Illustration, 19 March 1853

After the fall of Napoleon III later in 1870, they returned to France, where she taught at the Paris Conservatory and, until her husband's death in 1883, presided over a music salon in the Boulevard Saint-Germain. Her students included Ada Adini, Désirée Artôt, Selma Ek, Emma Engdahl-Jägerskiöld, Marie Hanfstängl, Yelizaveta Lavrovskaya, Rosa Linde, Felia Litvinne, Emilie Mechelin, Aglaja Orgeni, Helen Radnor, Anna Eugénie Schoen-René, Mafalda Salvatini, Raimund von zur-Mühlen, and Maria Wilhelmj. (See: List of music students by teacher: T to Z#Pauline Viardot.) Her pupil Natalia Iretskaya later became the teacher of Oda Slobodskaya and of Lydia Lipkowska, who in turn taught Virginia Zeani. She was also the godmother of Artôt's daughter Lola Artôt de Padilla. In 1877, her daughter Marianne was briefly engaged to Gabriel Fauré, but she later married composer Alphonse Duvernoy.

On 11 April 1873 she appeared at the Théâtre de l'Odéon in Paris in the first performance of Jules Massenet's oratorio Marie-Magdeleine.

From the mid-1840s, until her retirement, she was renowned for her appearances in Mozart's opera Don Giovanni, an opera with which her family had long been associated (see "Early life" above). In 1855, she had purchased Mozart's original manuscript of the opera in London. She preserved it in a shrine in her Paris home, where it was visited by many notable people, including Rossini, who genuflected, and Tchaikovsky, who said he was "in the presence of divinity". It was displayed at the Exposition Universelle of 1878, and at the centenary exhibition of Don Giovanni's premiere in 1887. In 1889 she announced she would donate it to the Conservatoire de Paris, and this occurred in 1892.

== Death ==
In 1910, Viardot died, aged 88. Her body is interred in the Montmartre Cemetery, Paris, France.

The Villa Viardot in Bougival, near Paris, was a gift to the Viardots by Ivan Turgenev in 1874.

== Compositions ==
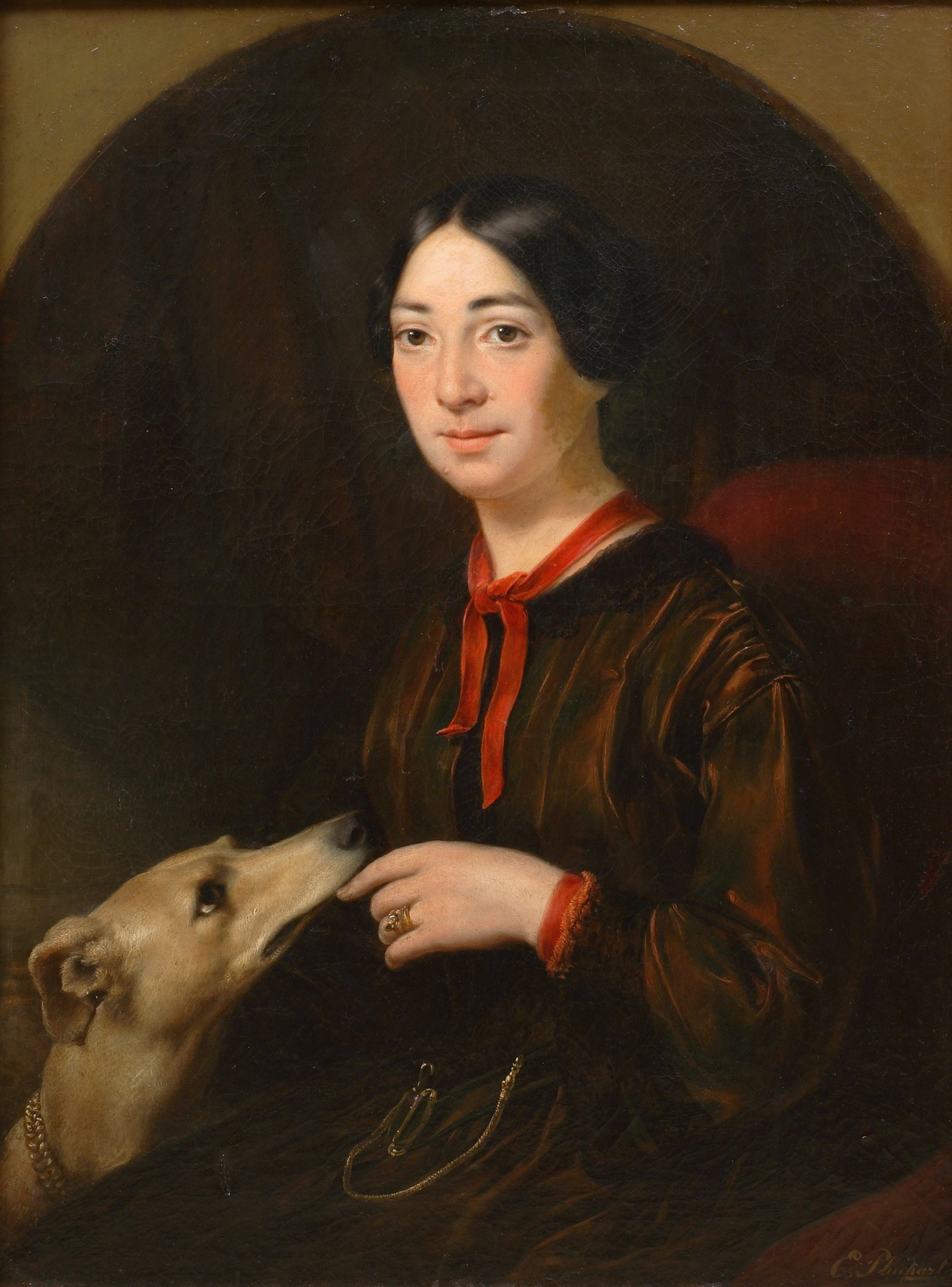
Portrait of Pauline Viardot (1853), by Eugène Pluchart

Viardot began composing when she was young, but it was never her intention to become a composer. Her compositions were written mainly as private pieces for her students with the intention of developing their vocal abilities. She did the bulk of her composing after her retirement at Baden-Baden. However, her works were of professional quality and Franz Liszt declared that, with Pauline Viardot, the world had finally found a woman composer of genius.

Having as a young girl studied with Liszt and with the music theorist and composer Anton Reicha, she was both an outstanding pianist and a complete all-around professional musician. Between 1864 and 1874 she wrote three salon operas – Trop de femmes (1867), L'ogre (1868), and Le dernier sorcier (1869), all to libretti by Ivan Turgenev – and over fifty Lieder. Her remaining two salon operas – Le conte de fées (1879), and Cendrillon (1904, when she was 83) – were to her own libretti. The operas may be small in scale; however, they were written for advanced singers and some of the music is difficult.

Opera

- Trop de femmes (libretto by Ivan Turgenev, 1867)
- L'ogre (Turgenev, 1868)
- Le dernier sorcier (Turgenev, 1869)
- Le conte de fées (own libretto, 1879)
- Cendrillon (own libretto, 1904)

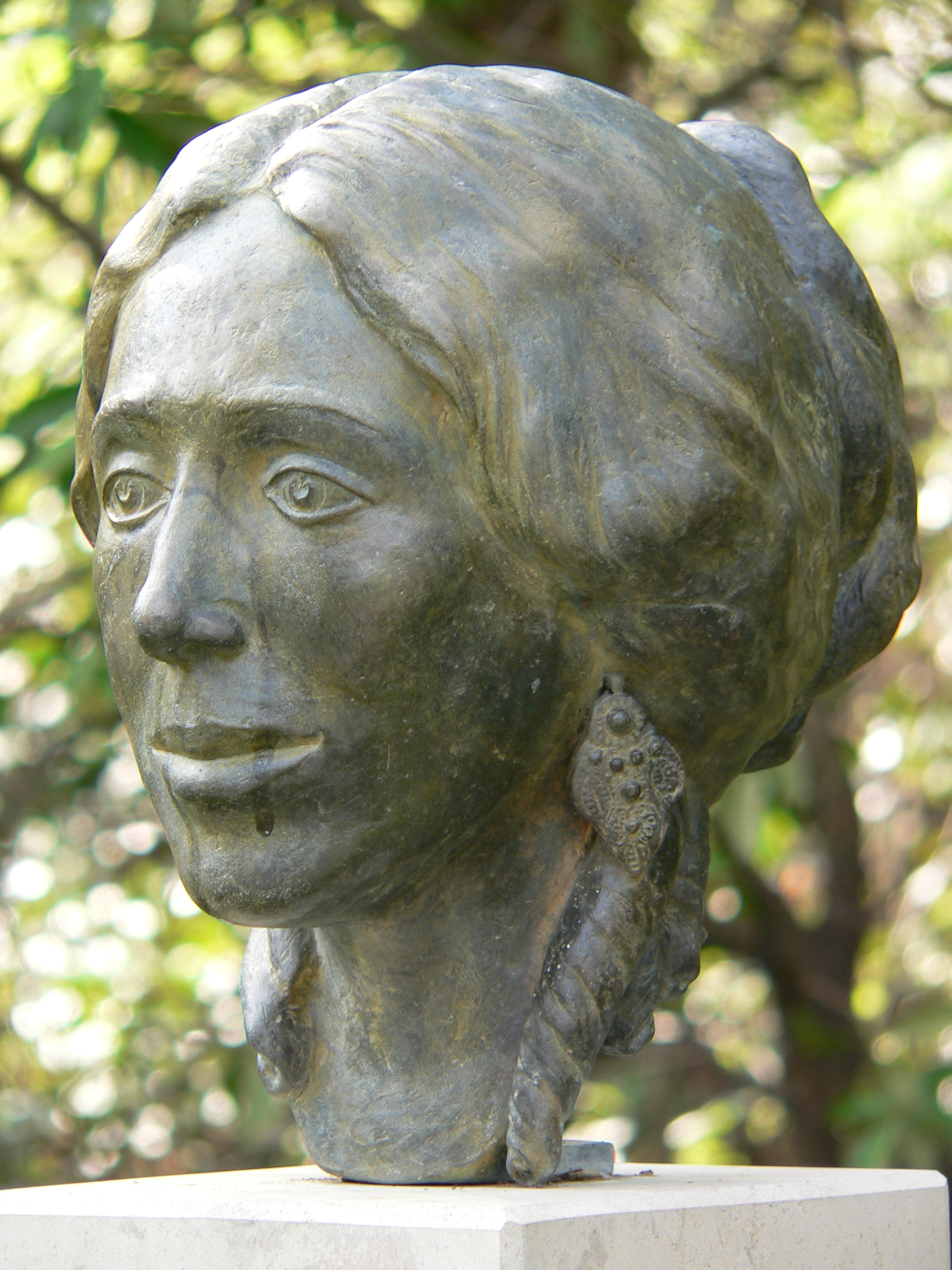
Bust of Viardot 2004 by Birgit Stauch in Baden-Baden

Choral

- Choeur bohémien
- Choeur des elfes
- Choeur de fileuses
- La Jeune République

Songs

- Album de Mme Viardot-Garcia (1843)
- L'Oiseau d'or (1843)
- 12 Mazurkas for voice and piano – based on Frédéric Chopin's works (1848)
- Duo, 2 solo voices and piano (1874)
- 100 songs including 5 Gedichte (1874)
- 4 Lieder (1880)
- 5 Poésies toscanes-paroles by L. Pomey (1881)
- 6 Mélodies (1884)
- Airs italiens du XVIII siècle (trans. L. Pomey) (1886)
- 6 chansons du XVe siècle
- Album russe
- Canti popolari toscani
- Vocal arrangements of instrumental works by Johannes Brahms, Joseph Haydn and Franz Schubert

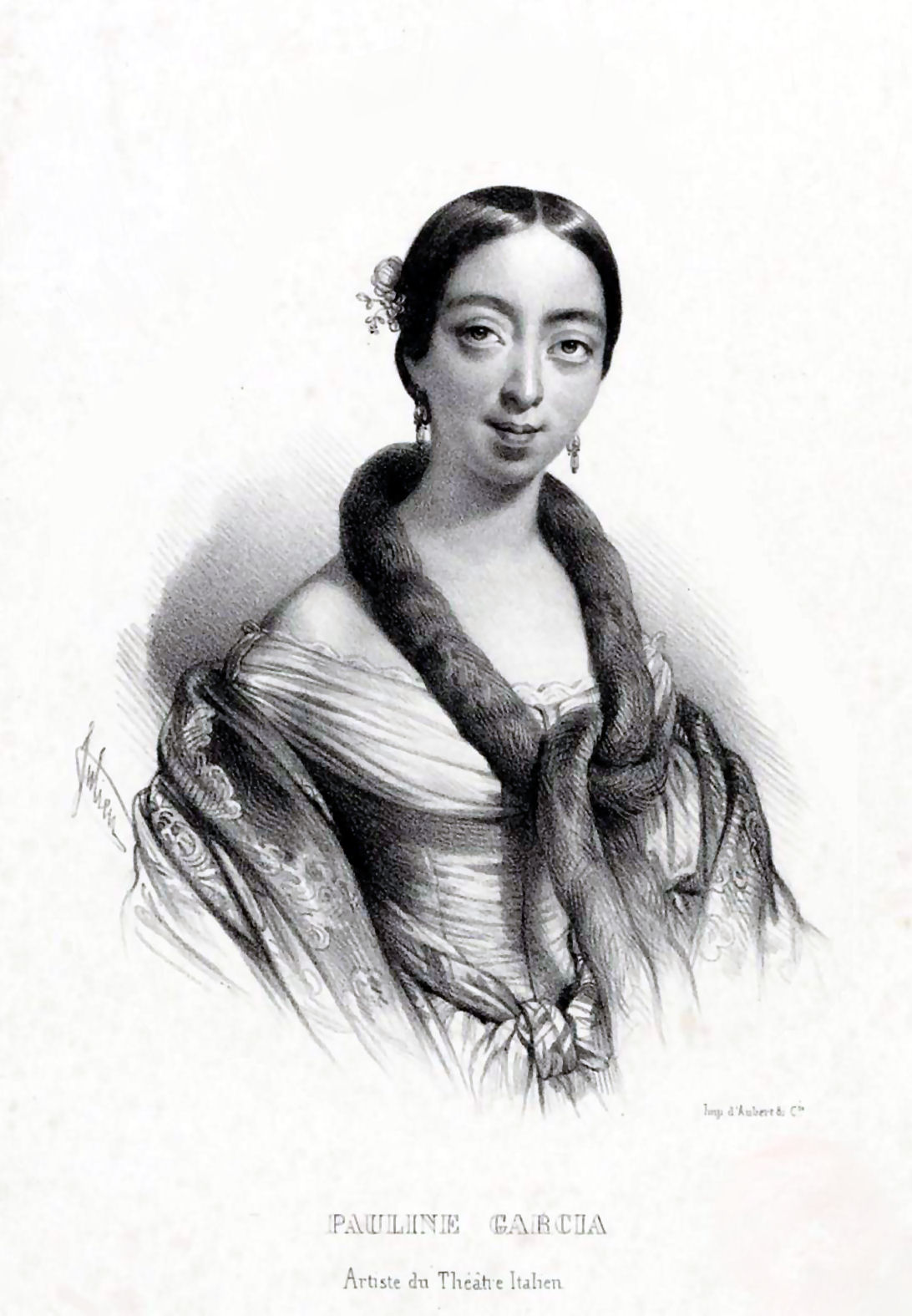
Lithograph of Pauline Garcia by Bernard-Romain Julien

Instrumental

- 2 airs de ballet for piano (1885)
- Défilé bohémien for piano 4 hands (1885)
- Introduction et polonaise for piano 4 hands (1874)
- Marche militaire for 2 flutes and piccolo, 2 oboes, 2 brass choirs (1868)
- Mazourke for piano (1868)
- 6 morceaux for violin and piano (1868)
- Second album russe for piano (1874)
- Sonatine for violin and piano (1874)
- Suite arménienne for piano for four hands

Source: Rachel M. Harris, The Music Salon of Pauline Viardot

== In popular culture ==
Viardot is a character in Alexander Chee's 2016 novel The Queen of the Night, appearing in her retirement at Baden-Baden as a teacher and mentor to the fictional narrator. She is also portrayed in Joie Davidow's novel An Unofficial Marriage (2021), based on her relationship with Turgenev.

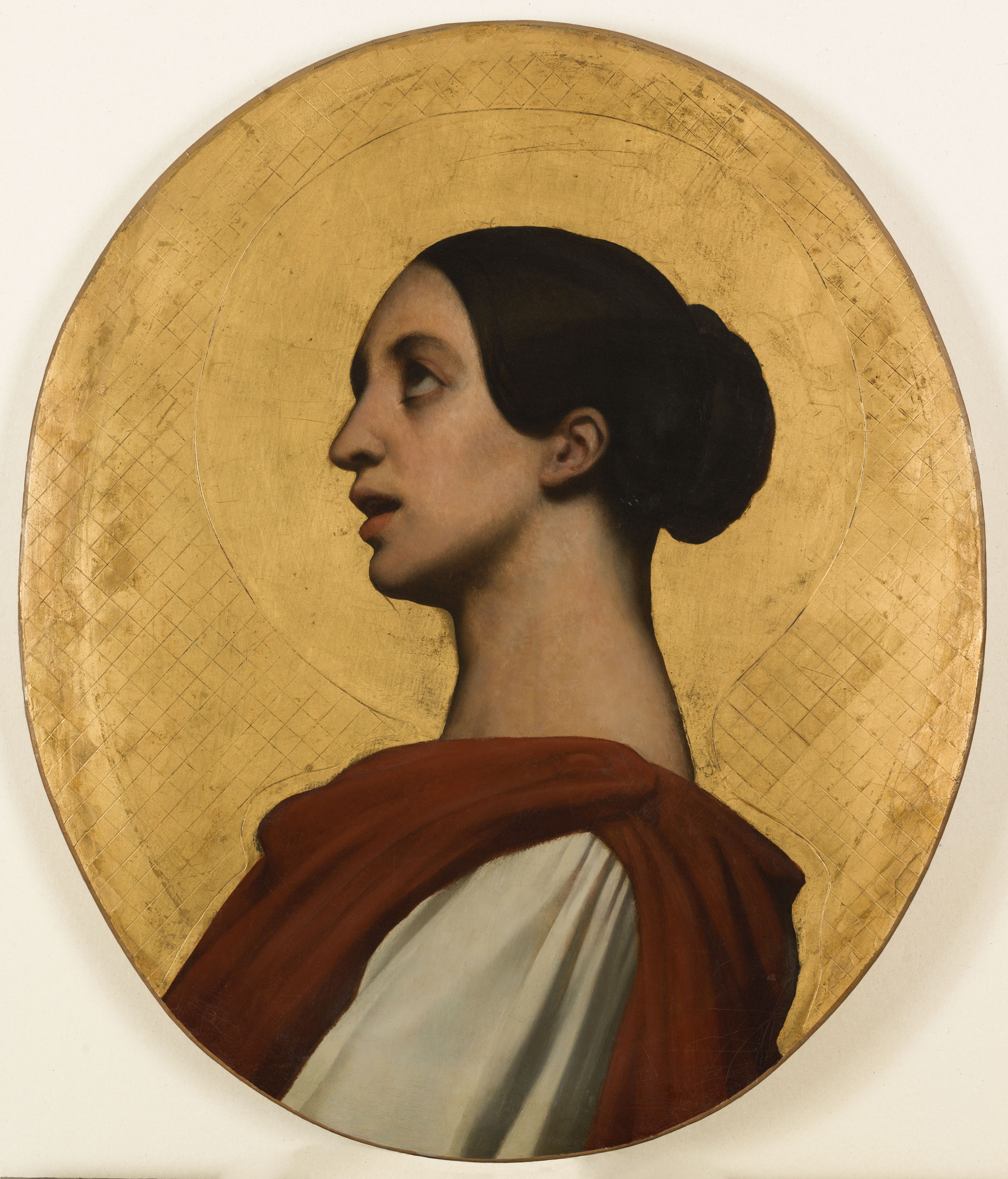
Portrait de Pauline Viardot en sainte Cécile (1851) by Ary Scheffer

A three-act opera based on Viardot's life, Notes on Viardot, with libretto and score by American composer Michael Ching, premiered in 2024. The story is told in flashbacks as a journalist interviews Viardot near the end of her life, and within Ching's original compositions the music weaves in songs and melodies from Viardot's own compositions plus arias she sang during her career.

== Genealogy ==
- Manuel García (1775–1832), singer, composer, impresario; married Joaquina Sitches (1780–1864)
  - Manuel García Junior (1805–1906), singer, composer, singing teacher; married Cécile Maria "Eugénie" Mayer (1814–1880)
    - Manuel García (1836–1885)
    - Gustave García (1837–1925), baritone and singing teacher; married Emily Matilda Ann Martorell (1835–?)
      - Alberto García (1875–1946), baritone
    - Eugenie Harouel (1840–1924)
    - Marie Crèpet (1842–1867)
  - Maria Malibran (1808–1836), singer; married Francois Eugene Malibran (1781–1836) (no issue); married Charles Auguste de Bériot (1802–1870), composer, violinist
    - Charles-Wilfrid de Bériot (1833–1914), pianist, composer, professor at the École Niedermeyer
  - Pauline Viardot (1821–1910), singer, composer; married Louis Viardot (1800–1883)
    - Louise Héritte-Viardot (1841–1918), composer, pianist, singer
    - Claudie Viardot (1852–1914); married Georges Chamerot; had issue
    - Marianne Viardot (1854–1919), painter, briefly engaged to Gabriel Fauré; married Alphonse Duvernoy
    - Paul Viardot (1857–1941)
