= Le dernier sorcier =

1867 opera by Pauline Viardot

- Chamber opera by Pauline Viardot
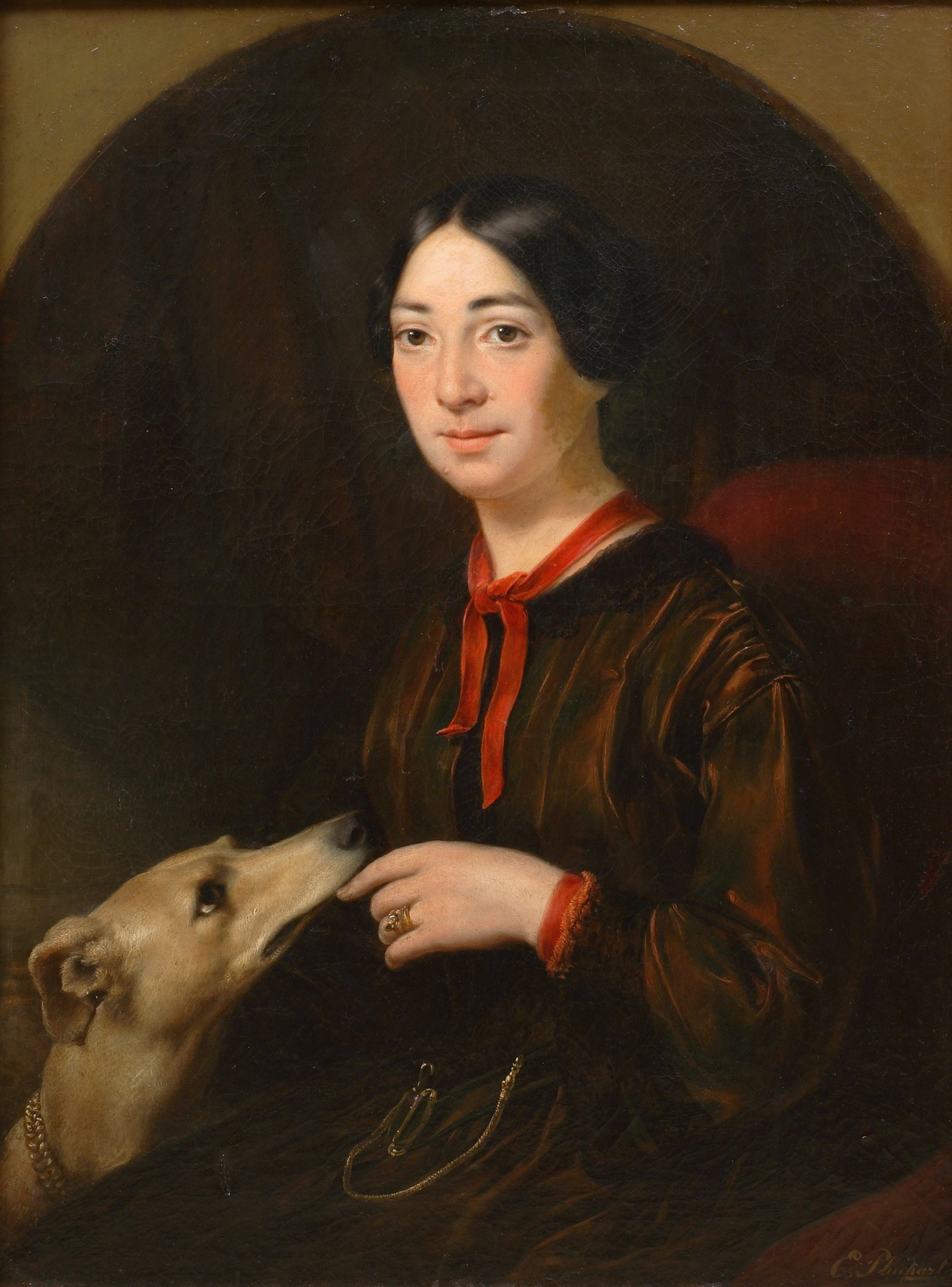
- The composer c. 1853
- Translation: The Last Sorcerer
- Other title: Der letzte Zauberer
- Librettist: Ivan Turgenev
- Language: French
- Premiere: 8 April 1869 (in German); Court Theatre, Weimar

Le dernier sorcier (The Last Sorcerer) is a chamber opera in two acts with music composed by Pauline Viardot to a French libretto by Ivan Turgenev. It was first performed privately on 20 September 1867 at the Villa Turgenev in Baden-Baden and received its first public performance at the Court Theatre in Weimar on 8 April 1869 (in German translation as Der letzte Zauberer). The story revolves around Krakamiche, an old and once-powerful sorcerer whose presence in the woods has upset the elves living there, and a romance between the sorcerer's daughter Stella and Prince Lelio, whose marriage comes about through the intervention of a Queen of the Elves.

== Background and first performance ==
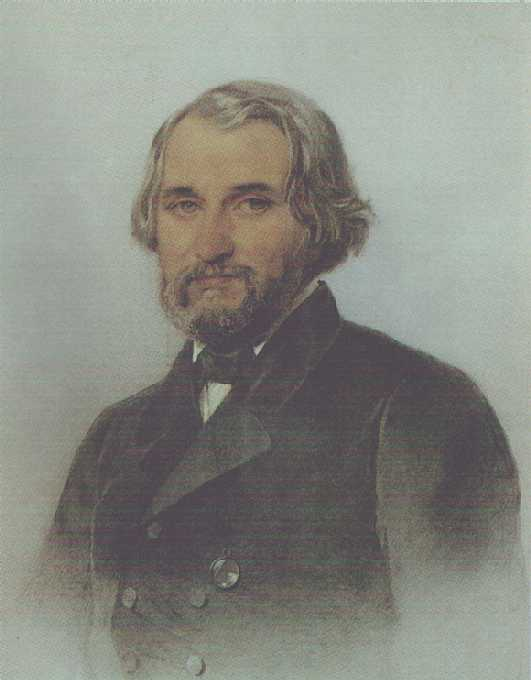
Ivan Turgenev in 1857

By the mid-1860s, after her retirement from the stage and living at her villa (Villa Viardot) in Baden-Baden, Viardot's main activities centered around her teaching, including giving her students experience of performing in small-scale operas in a private setting. Although married, Viardot had long had an intimate friendship with Ivan Turgenev whom she first met when singing in St. Petersburg in 1843. The relationship had continued over the years with Turgenev having extensive stays in Paris, always living close to Viardot and her husband, Louis. When the Viardots went to Baden-Baden in 1863, Turgenev followed shortly thereafter and built his own villa next to theirs. Turgenev and Viardot's collaboration in Baden-Baden produced three operas designed to be performed by her students: Trop de femmes, Le dernier sorcier and L'ogre.

According to Turgenev scholar Nicholas Žekulin, Le dernier sorcier was already mentioned in correspondence in 1859, but does not appear to have been performed until it was revised for Baden-Baden. The first performance of the opera was on September 20, 1867, at the completed but as yet unoccupied Villa Turgenev, where the first performance of Trop de femmes had also taken place. Turgenev's friend, Louis Pomey, was Krakamiche for the initial performances. The part was taken by Turgenev for a gala performance on October 20. Marie Hasselmans played Stella. Viardot's daughter, Louise Héritte played the role of Lelio. Other Viardot children were Claudie as the Queen, Marianne as Verveine, and Paul as Perlimpinpin (most of these roles were spoken). Viardot accompanied on piano, the sole instrument in the original score. The audience consisted of invited guests who were primarily from Viardot's circle. They included Giulia Grisi, Garcia, Clara Schumann, Charles-Wilfrid de Bériot, Hermann Levi, and singers Marianne Lüdecke and Albertina Ferlesi. Pierre-Jules Hetzel (who reviewed the production of Trop de femmes for the Journal des débats, September 13, 1867), a few politicians, and the German Empress Augusta of Saxe-Weimar-Eisenach also attended. The Empress's enthusiasm not only caused her to bring her husband Kaiser William I along for a subsequent performance, but also led to a special royal command performance on October 17 to celebrate the birthday of the Crown Prince, Friedrich Wilhelm.

== Later performance history ==
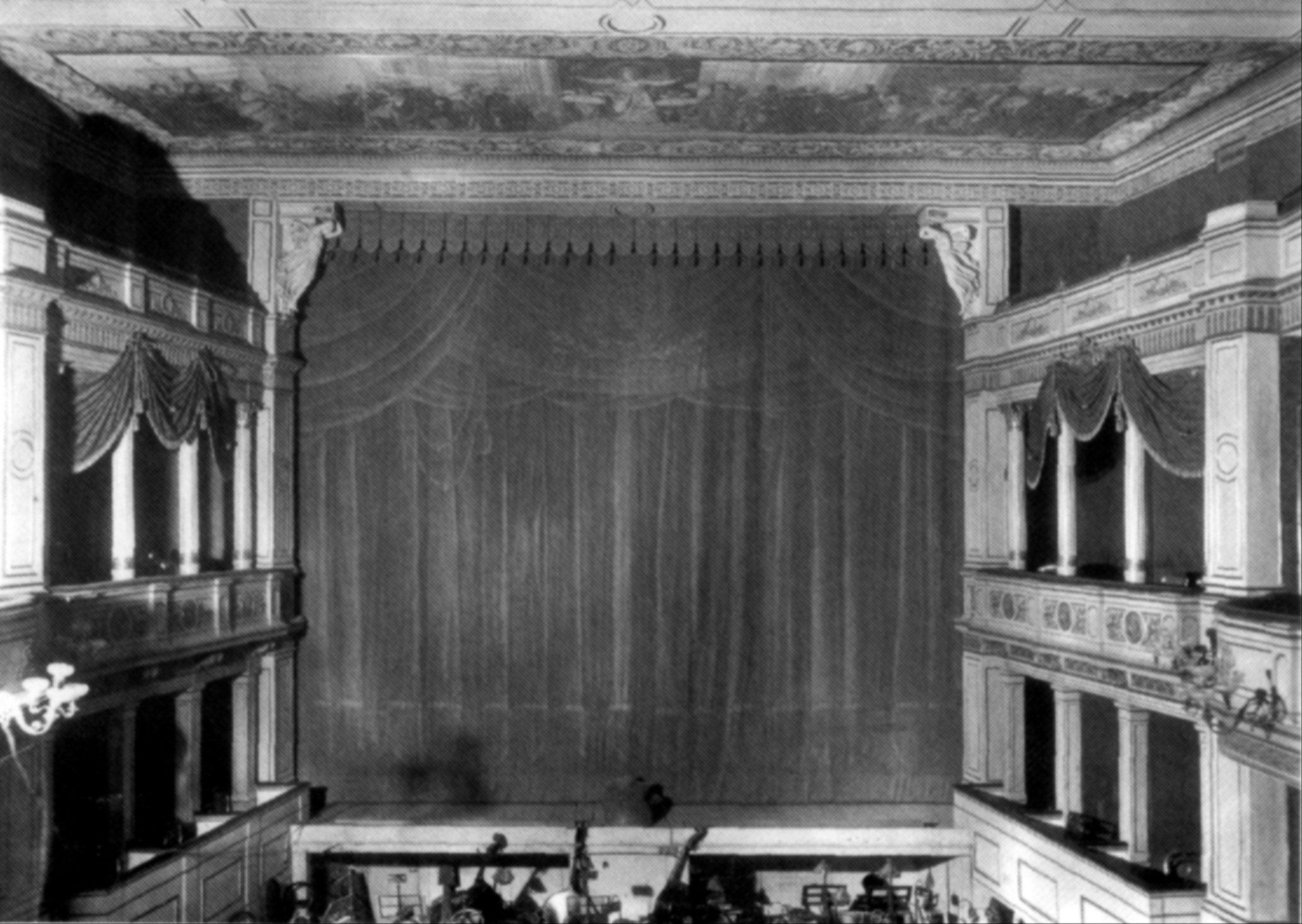
Interior of the Weimar Court Theatre, where Le dernier sorcier had its first public performance on April 8, 1869

Following a second season of Viardot and Turgenev's privately performed operettas, which included the first performance of L'ogre, their reputation began to spread which led to the first public performance of Le dernier sorcier. With help of Franz Liszt, its first professional public performance was arranged for the Weimar Court Theatre, where it premiered on April 8, 1869, and was repeated on April 11. For those performances, the libretto was translated into German by Richard Pohl and the score was arranged for a full orchestra by Eduard Lassen. The reviews of Der letzte Zauberer (the opera's German title) were mixed. According to Žekulin, this may have been due to the "ponderous" German translation and the arrangement for a full symphony orchestra which overwhelmed what was originally composed as a chamber piece. Nevertheless, there were subsequent performances of the German version in Karlsruhe (January 28 and February 1, 1870) and in Riga later that year as part of a benefit performance for Louise Mayer, who had been a pupil of Viardot's in Baden-Baden.

Viardot's villa in Baden-Baden had an adjacent salon and art gallery. She later added a small theatre there known locally as the Théâtre du Thiergarten, which could seat about 30 people, making it appropriate for small stage productions. The theatre was inaugurated on August 13, 1869, with a gala performance of Le dernier sorcier. Brahms was in the audience that night and returned to conduct the August 23 performance himself. although on that occasion, it was given in a chamber orchestration—piano, string quartet, harp and percussion. After the outbreak of the Franco-Prussian War in July 1870, the Viardot family left Baden-Baden for London where they stayed until 1871, with Turgenev, once again living nearby. While Viardot was in London, Le dernier sorcier received a private performance there.

The work was largely forgotten until January 2005 when the University of Calgary staged its North American premiere using an English translation of the French libretto by Žekulin and the version of the score for chamber orchestra that had been used at the 1869 gala performance in the Théâtre du Thiergarten, which Žekulin reconstructed from Viardot's papers at Harvard University. As part of the commemorations for the centenary of Viardot's death, the opera was given another staging in July 2010 (using Žekulin's 2005 version of the score) at the convent of the Minims in Pourrières.

The opera received its UK premiere in 2022 by Gothic Opera, as part of a double-bill with Louise Bertin's Le loup-garou, with performances at the Round Chapel in Hackney, London.

== Roles ==
Roles	Voice type	Premiere cast, 20 September 1867 (Conductor: )
Krakamiche, an old sorcerer	baritone	Louis Pomey
Stella, his daughter	soprano	Marie Hasselmans
Perlimpinpin, Krakamiche's old servant	speaking role	Paul Viardot
Prince Lelio	contralto?	Louise Héritte-Viardot
Queen of the elves	speaking role	Claudie Viardot
Verveine, an elf	speaking role?	Marianne Viardot
chorus of elves

== Synopsis ==
=== Setting ===
In a forest in a far away land lives Krakamiche. In his youth, he was a powerful and feared sorcerer who set up a magnificent magic palace and a strong servant in the forest. But time has diminished his power so that the palace is now a hut, the servant old, and Krakamiche is able to use his wand only with much effort to summon his daily bread. He lives with his daughter, Stella.

In the same forest live elves, ruled by a Queen, all of whom are Krakamiche's enemies. In his youth Krakamiche expropriated land in the forest; the elves were unable to fight him due to his power. But in his old age, they pester and annoy him. Nearby lives Prince Lelio, a king's son, who often hunts in the forest. He has fallen in love with Stella and wants to marry her, although he doesn't know who she is.

All action takes place within Krakamiche's hut.

=== Act 1 ===
The curtain rises on Krakamiche's hut, where the elves are teasing Krakamiche ("Par ici, par ici!"). They pour water on his fireplace and laugh at his distress. With the Queen, they plan to disguise themselves as Cochinese and to trick Krakamiche into taking magic grass that will lead him to believe in the restoration of his youth. They exit upon the entrance of Prince Lelio who pines for Stella ("Dans le bois frais et sombre"). The Queen appears and makes a deal with Lelio: In return for his obeying her commands, she gives him a magic flower that enables him to disappear (the flower only works at night) ("Ramasse cette rose"). They exit.

Krakamiche returns, moans his fate ("Ah la sotte existence") and has a comic duet with his servant Perlimpinpin ("Eh bien!"), resulting in the servant being kicked out of the house and Krakamiche leaving. Stella enters and sings of the rain ("Chanson de la pluie" or "Coulez, gouttes fines"). The Queen returns and tells Stella of her impending meeting with Lelio ("Sur les yeux de ton père"). Perlimpinpin enters, revealing his agedness ("Chanson de Perlimpinpin" or "Quand j'étais un géant"). A delegation of Cochinese is heard approaching (really the elves in disguise) and Krakamiche receives them ("Messieurs le sénateurs!"). After the welcome, he is eager to try the magic grass, but the trick is revealed, and he winds up being tormented by the elves and driven to a wild waltz ("Ronde des Lutins" or "Tourne, tourne comme un tonton"). The Queen and the elves celebrate victory and depart ("Ronde des elfes" or "Compagnes ailées").

=== Act 2 ===
Lelio cannot wait to use the magic flower to approach Stella ("Stornello" or "Pourrais-je jamais aimer une autre femme?"). He withdraws upon hearing the approach of Krakamiche and Stella. Krakamiche is carrying a book of spells from Merlin, and searches for the incantation that will prevent the Queen's power from affecting him. Stella works her spinning wheel. A duet ensues in which Krakamiche desires wealth and seeks revenge for his tormentors, but Stella doesn't want wealth but just a happy home and warm heart ("Si tu ne sais pas"). While Krakamiche seeks the incantation, Stella sings a song, but hears Lelio sing the third verse ("Quand vient la saison fleurie"). Lelio enters using the magic flower. He and Stella sing to one another ("C'est moi, ne craignez rien"), but Krakamiche can not see him, in part because he thinks he found the correct words. Lelio kneels before Stella, but drops the flower. This makes him visible to Krakamiche, who thinks it was his own power which has made the prince appear, and who is furious. He casts a spell to summon a monster who will annihilate the prince ("Louppola, Schibbola, Trix"). But instead of a monster, the spell brings forth a goat, and Krakamiche faints from exhaustion. As Stella and Lelio rush to help him, the Queen appears. In order to help the young couple, Krakamiche gives in and consents to his daughter's marriage and promises to leave the forest, to live with his daughter and son-in-law in the latter's castle. In an unaccompanied quartet, Krakamiche, Stella, Lelio, and Perlimpinpin sing of their futures ("Adieu témoins de ma misère!"). They leave, and the Queen waves her wand, making Krakamiche's hut disappear as the elves rejoice over the return of their forest ("Salut! Salut! O forêt bien aimée!").

== Recording ==
- 2019: Le dernier sorcier, Eric Owens, Jamie Barton, Camille Zamora, Adriana Zabala, Michael Slattery, Sarah Brailey; Manhattan Girls Chorus, Michelle Oesterle (conductor); pianos: Liana Pailodze Harron, Myra Huang; narrator: Trudie Styler (Bridge, cat: 9515)

== Sources ==
- Brodbeck, David (1988). "Compatibility, Coherence, and Closure in Brahms' Liebeslieder Waltzes" in Explorations in Music, the Arts, and Ideas: Essays in Honor of Leonard B. Meyer. Pendragon Press, pp. 411–438. ISBN 0-918728-94-0
- Commire, Anne; Klezmer, Deborah (2002). "Viardot, Pauline (1821–1910)". Women in World History : A Biographical Encyclopedia. Archived from the original on November 5, 2012 – via HighBeam Research.
- Opéra au Village (2010) Programme notes for Le dernier sorcier, July 2010 (in French)
- Žekulin, Nicholas G. (1989). The story of an operetta: 'Le dernier sorcier' by Pauline Viardot and Ivan Turgenev. München: Verlag O. Sagner. ISBN 3-87690-428-5
- Žekulin, Nicholas G. (2005). Le dernier sorcier, Programme notes for the production by the University of Calgary, January 13, 14, 15, 2005
