= Lucienne Bréval =

Late 19th and early 20th century opera singer

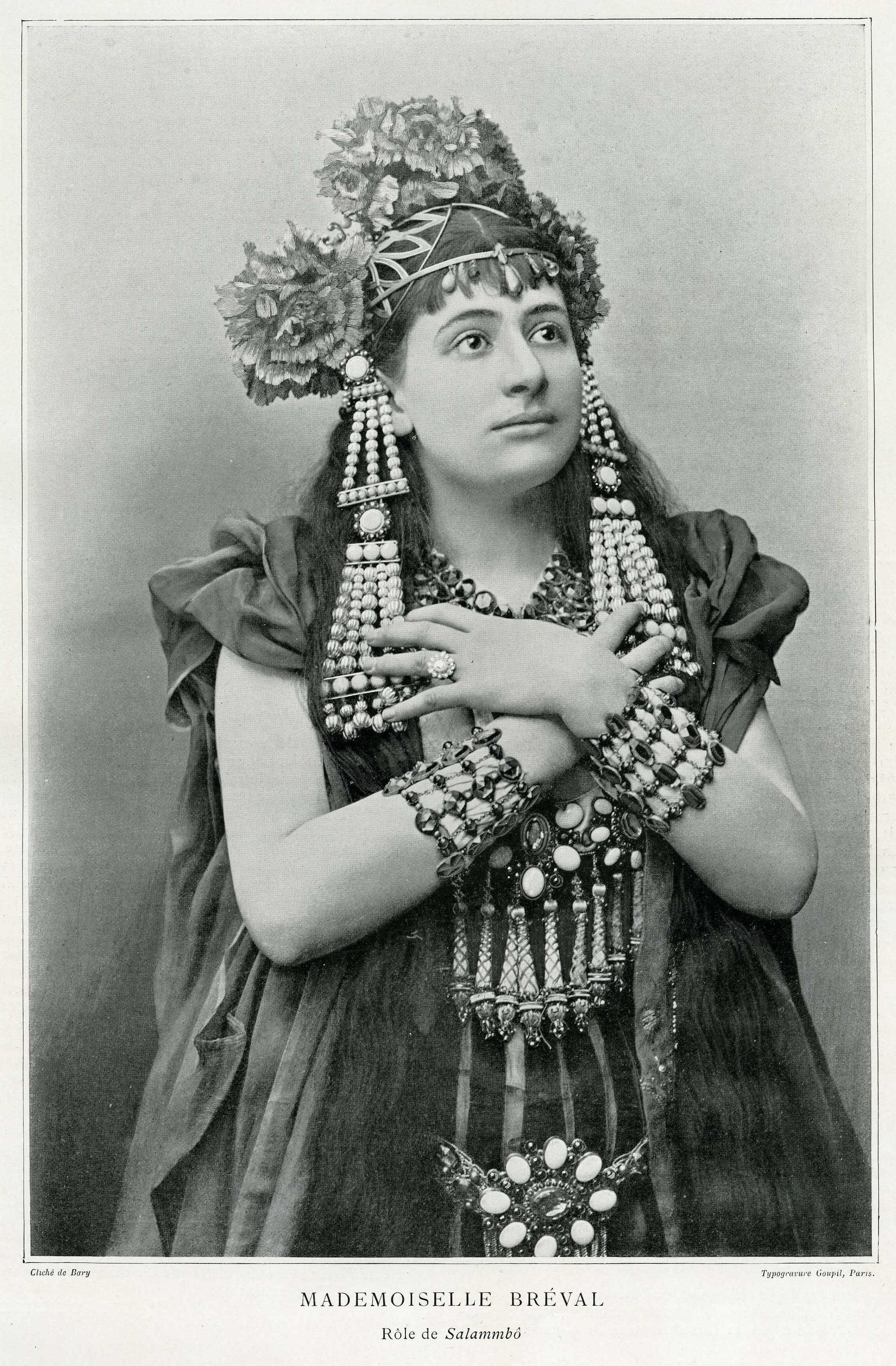
Lucienne Bréval

Lucienne Bréval (4 November 1869 – 15 August 1935) was a Swiss dramatic soprano who had a major international opera career from 1892 to 1918. Although she appeared throughout Europe and in the United States, Bréval spent most of her career performing with the Paris Opera where she became a greatly admired interpreter of French grand opera roles and Wagner heroines. She also specialized in the works of Gluck and Rameau, becoming particularly associated with the title roles in Gluck's Armide and Rameau's Hippolyte et Aricie. A favorite of the composers of her day, such as Massenet and Dukas, Bréval sang in numerous world premières during her career.

== Biography ==
Born with the name Bertha Agnès Lisette Schilling, Bréval initially studied to be a pianist at Lausanne and briefly in Geneva before deciding to pursue an opera career. She studied voice with Victor Warot at the Paris Conservatoire before making her debut at the Paris Opera in 1892 as Selika in l'Africaine by Giacomo Meyerbeer.

=== At the Paris Opéra ===
Bréval became a principal soprano at the Paris Opéra and remained there until 1919. Her roles with the company included several world premières including Augusta Holmès's La Montagne Noire (1895), Camille Erlanger's Le fils de l' étoile (1904), Dukas' Ariane et Barbe-bleue (1907), Massenet's Bacchus (1909), and the title roles in Massenet's Ariane (1906) and Henry Février’s Monna Vanna (1909). She also was Kundry in France's first performance of Wagner's Parsifal (1914). Her other notable roles at the Paris Opera included Brünnhilde in Richard Wagner's Die Walküre (1893), Venus in Wagner's Tannhäuser (1895), Marguerite in Hector Berlioz's La damnation de Faust (1897), and the title role in Rameau's Hippolyte et Aricie (1908).

Bréval also occasionally appeared in productions at the Opéra-Comique in Paris. Most notably she portrayed the title role in the world premiere of Massenet's Grisélidis in 1901, and in 1910 she sang Lady Macbeth in the première of Ernest Bloch's Macbeth, which he dedicated to her.

=== International career ===
In 1899, Bréval made her first appearance at the Royal Opera, Covent Garden as Valentine in Meyerbeer's Les Huguenots. Two years later she made her American début at the Metropolitan Opera as Chimène in Le Cid, singing also in Die Walküre and the American première of Ernest Reyer's Salammbô. Five years later she returned to Covent Garden for the second and last time in the title role of Gluck's Armide. In 1913 she created the title role in Fauré's Pénélope at the Opéra de Monte-Carlo; her other title roles there had been in Isidore De Lara's Amy Robsart and in Bizet's Carmen.

Throughout her career Bréval appeared in recitals and concerts throughout Europe, including performances in Italy, England, Germany, Holland, Belgium, Switzerland and throughout France. In spite of her great reputation in Europe she was not as well received in America as critics believed her singing lacked polish and described her acting as "semaphoric". After her retirement from the stage in 1919, Bréval taught singing in Paris.

== Recordings ==
The only sound recording of Bréval singing was made on a Mapleson cylinder during a performance of L'Africaine at the Metropolitan Opera.
