= Marcelle Demougeot =

Singer from France

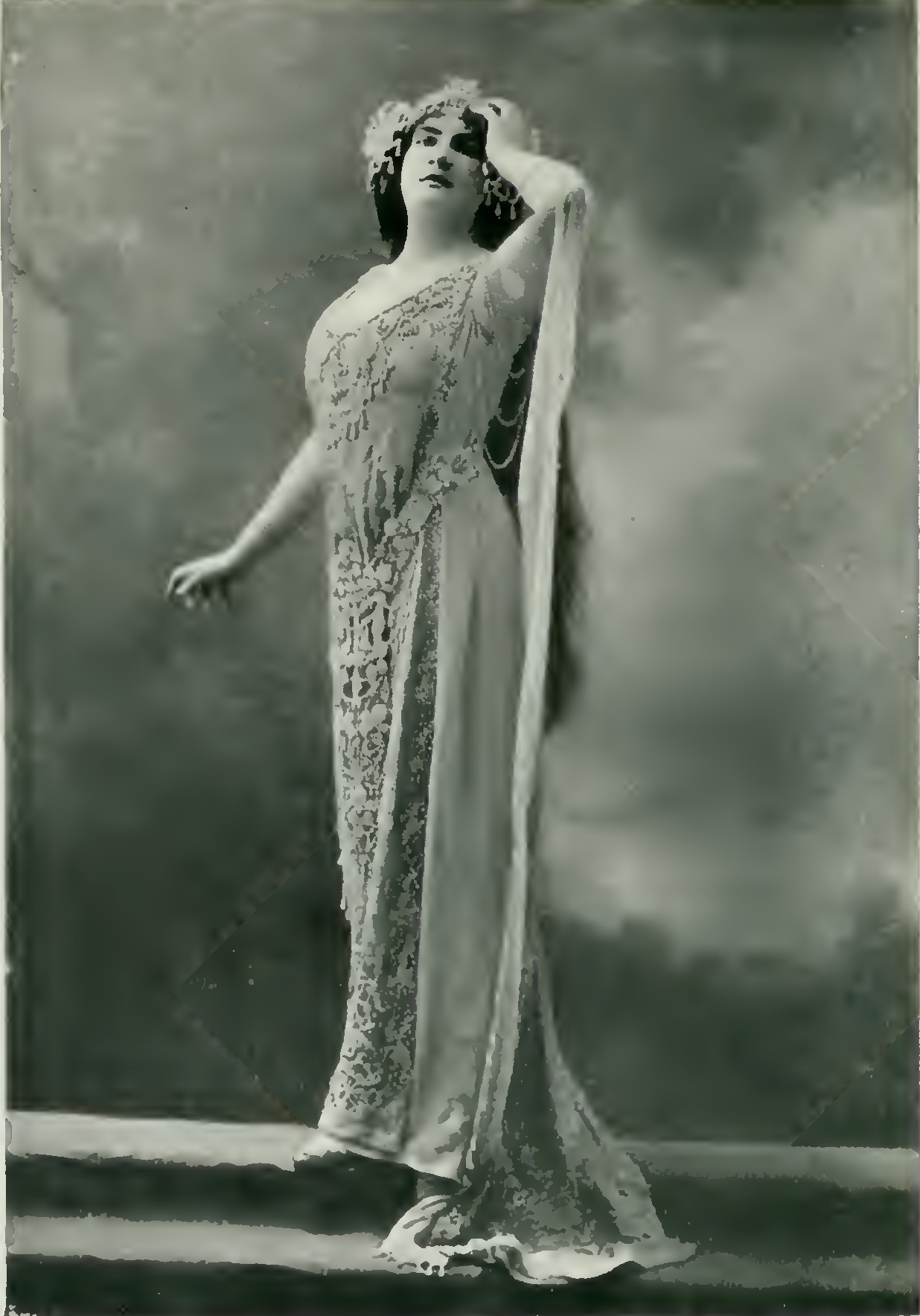
- Marcelle Demougeot as Brünnhilde
- Born: 8 June 1876; Dijon
- Died: 23 November 1931; Sainte-Maxime
- Occupation: Opera singer (soprano)

Marcelle Demougeot (8 June 1876 – 23 November 1931), born Jeanne Marguerite Marcelle Decorne, was a French soprano, "the best-known French Wagnerian singer of her generation".

== Early life ==
Jeanne Marguerite Marcelle Decorne was born in Dijon, where she studied with Charles Laurent. She trained further as a singer at the Conservatoire de Paris.

== Career ==
Demougeot made her professional debut in 1902, as Donna Elvira in Paris. She was known for singing Wagnerian roles including Brünnhilde and Kundry. She sang in several premiere productions, including Le fils de l’étoile (1904) by Camille Erlanger, Ariane (1906) by Massenet, a French-language production of Das Rheingold (1909) by Wagner, Déjanire, (1911) by Camille Saint-Saëns, and the Paris premiere of Parsifal (1914). She made several recordings before 1910.

In 1916, Demougeot sang at a benefit for blind veterans in Vichy. She sang La Marseillaise outside the Palais Garnier to mark the signing of peace at the end of World War I, and later sang at a victory festival in Ostend. In 1919 she sang at the official Bastille Day celebrations in Paris. In 1924 she sang during festivities surrounding the Summer Olympics in Paris.

== Personal life ==
Demougeot died in 1931, in Sainte-Maxime.
