= Lucy Arbell =

French mezzo-soprano (1878–1947)

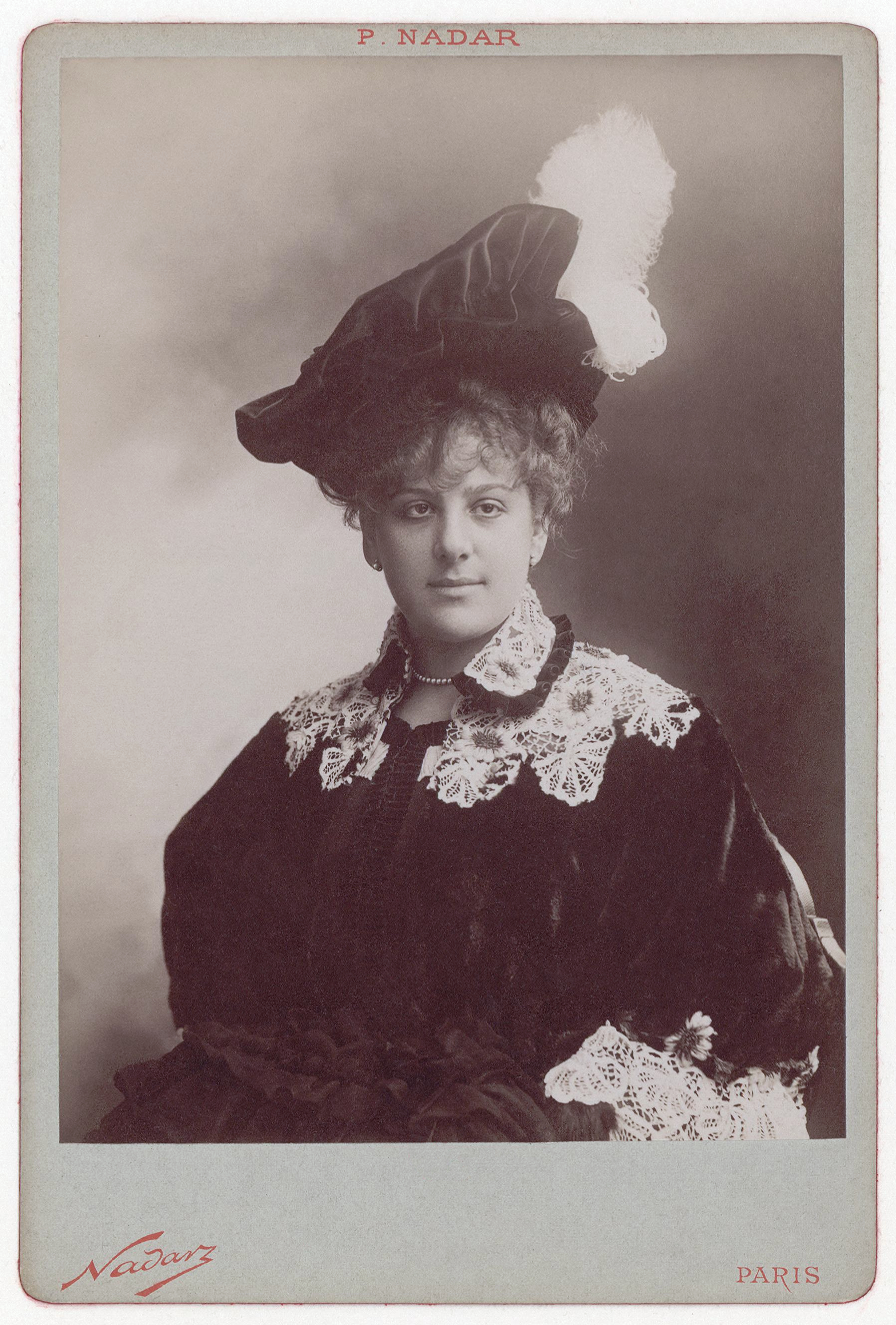
- Carte de visite of Lucy Arbell by Paul Nadar
- Born: Georgette Wallace; 8 June 1878; Le Vésinet, France
- Died: 21 May 1947 (aged 68); Bougival, France
- Occupation: Opera singer

Lucy Arbell (née Georgette Gall, later Georgette Wallace) (8 June 1878 – 21 May 1947) was a French mezzo-soprano whose operatic career was mainly centred in Paris and who was particularly associated with the composer Jules Massenet.

== Life and career ==
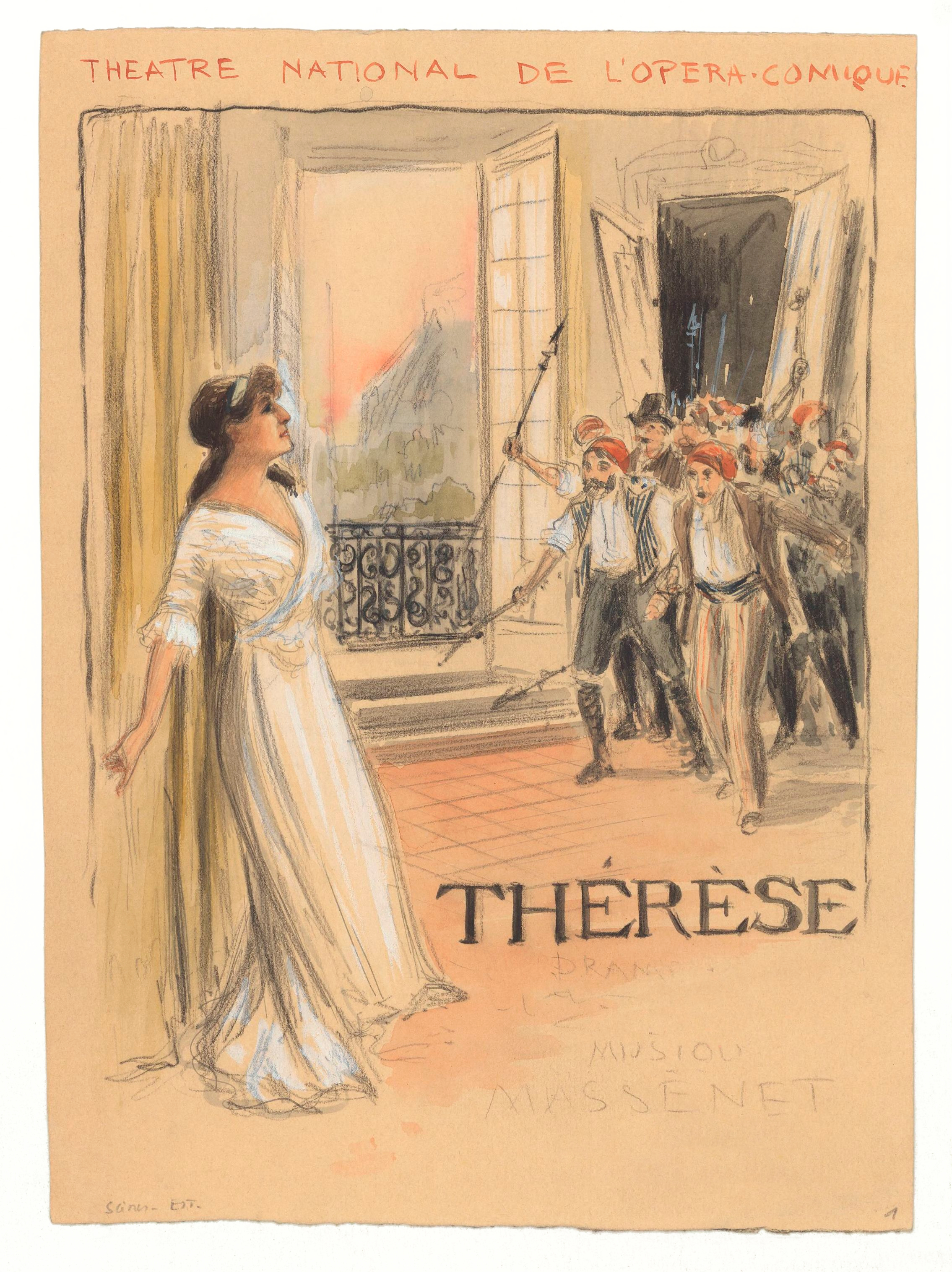
Arbell reprising the title role of Jules Massenet's Thérèse (which she created) for the 1911 Paris première.

Georgette's father was Edmond Richard Wallace (1840–1887), son of Sir Richard Wallace, the renowned art collector and philanthropist.

Arbell made her stage debut as Dalila at the Paris Opéra on 23 October 1903. She also sang there as Amneris in Aida, Madalena in Rigoletto, Uta in Sigurd, Fricka in Die Walküre and Thérèse.

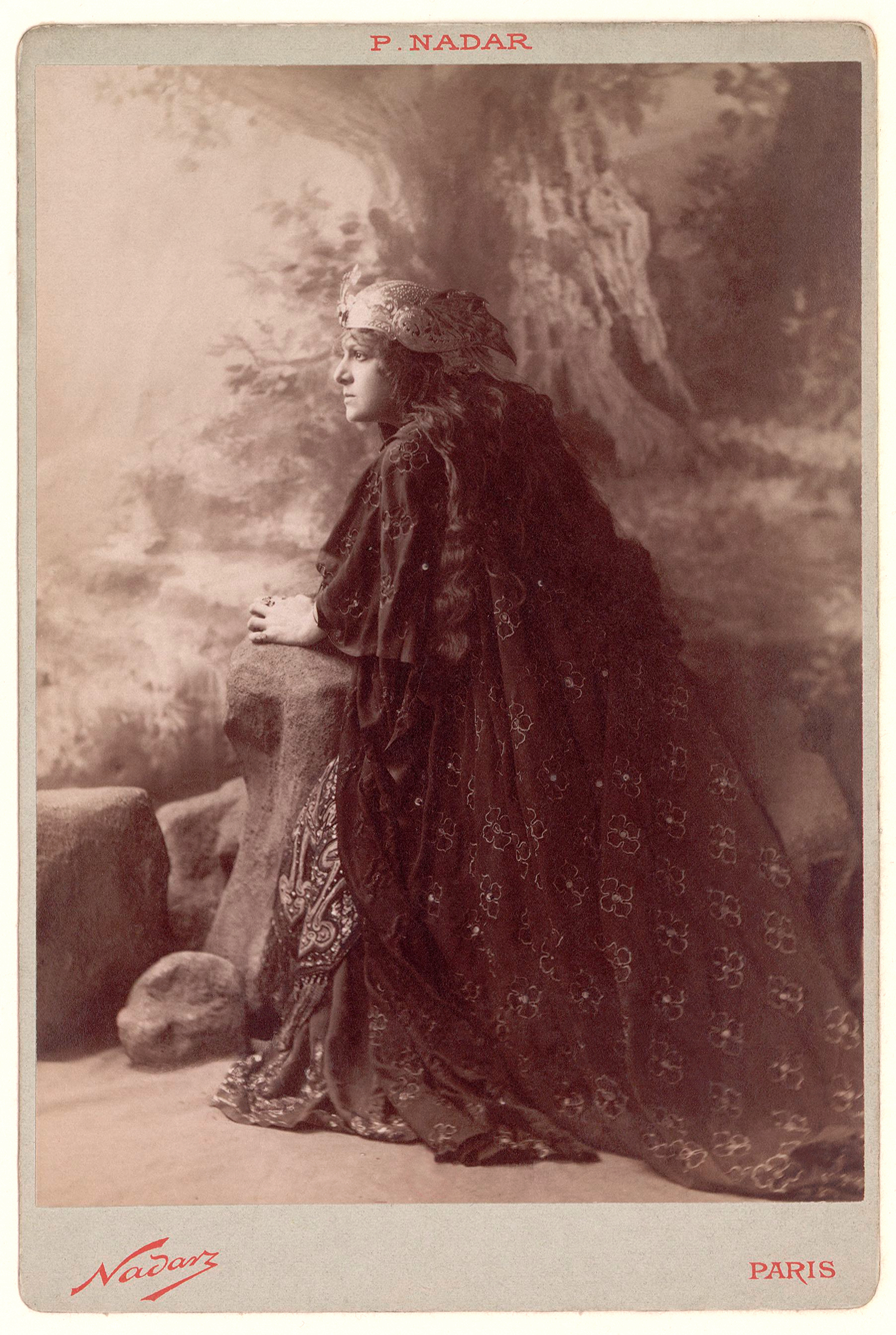
Arbell in the role of Queen Amahelli at the Théâtre de l'Opéra (Palais Garnier), during the creation of Bacchus in 1909. Photograph by Paul Nadar.

She had a close association with the late operas of Massenet, creating roles in Ariane (Perséphone), Thérèse (title role), Bacchus (Queen Amahelli), Don Quichotte (Dulcinée) in Monte-Carlo and Paris, Roma (Postumia), and Panurge (Colombe). She had a close relationship with Massenet as well; the critic Rodney Milnes describes Arbell as "gold-digging", charging that her blatant exploitation of the composer's honourable affections caused his wife considerable distress and even strained Massenet's devotion (or infatuation as Milnes characterises it). After the composer's death in 1912, Arbell pursued his widow and publishers through the law courts, seeking to secure a monopoly of the leading roles in several of his late operas.

As a singer she is described as having a strong, vibrant 'mezzo-contralto' and a vivacious personality. She may have been a talented actor, but her voice was considered by some critics to be mediocre; the roles created for her included extensive passages of declamation, something not usually seen in the operas of the period.

At the Opéra-Comique she sang Charlotte (Werther) up to the 1920s, but largely fell into oblivion after Massenet's death in 1912.
