= Thérèse (opera) =

Opera by Jules Massenet

- Opera by Jules Massenet
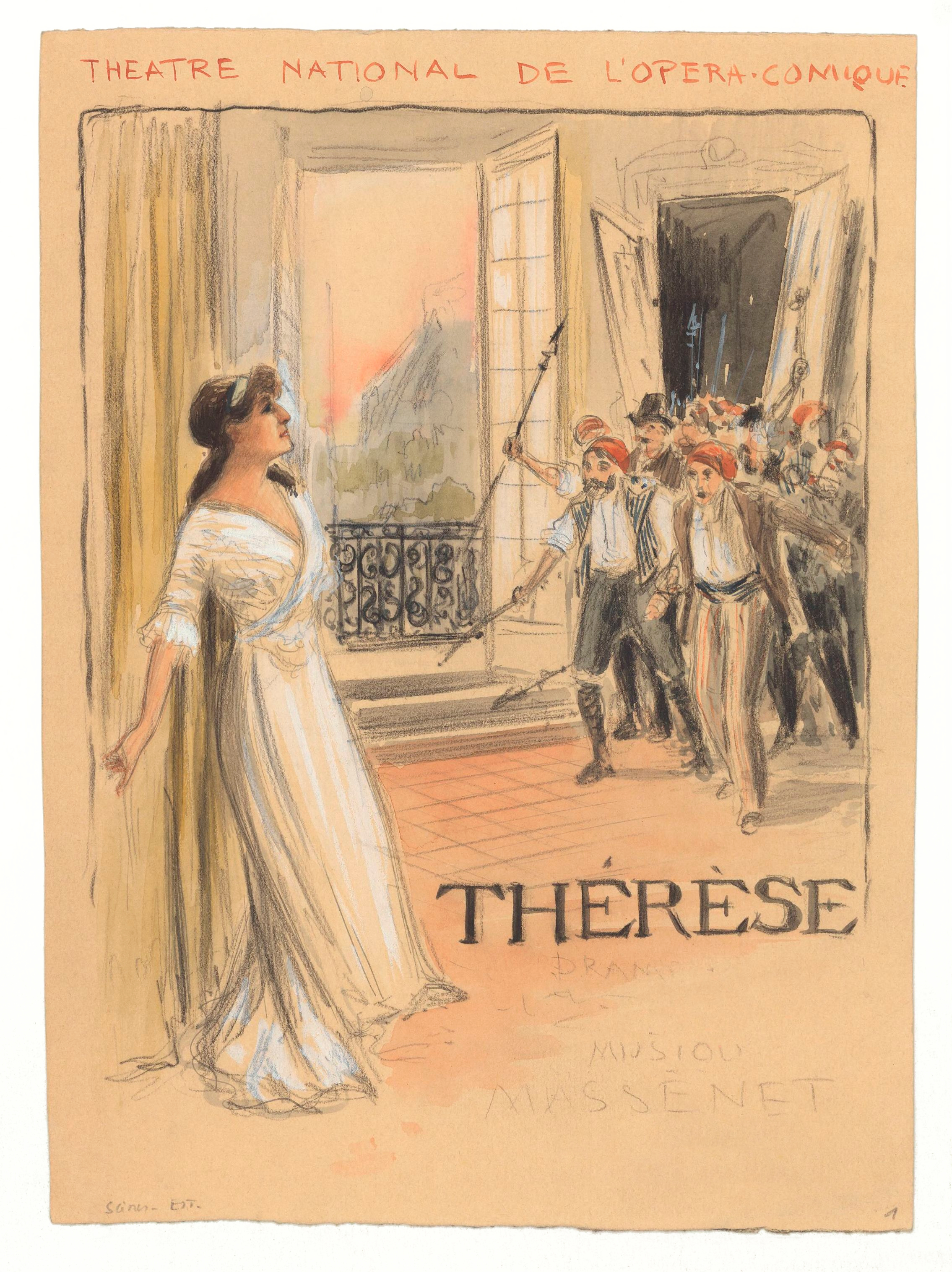
- Poster design for the Paris première highlighting Lucy Arbell as Thérèse.
- Librettist: Jules Claretie
- Language: French
- Premiere: 7 February 1907; Opéra de Monte-Carlo

Thérèse is an opera in two acts by Jules Massenet to a French libretto by Jules Claretie. While Thérèse remains among Massenet's lesser-known works, the piece has spawned a number of revivals and recordings.

First performed in Monte Carlo in 1907, it has a running time of approximately 70 minutes. Notable recordings of the work include a 1970s Richard Bonynge version for Decca, featuring Huguette Tourangeau in the title role, as well as a 2013 version by Alain Altinoglu.

== Performance history ==
Thérèse was first performed at the Opéra de Monte-Carlo on 7 February 1907, featuring Lucy Arbell in the title role, Edmond Clément as Armand de Clerval and Hector Dufranne as André Thorel. For the Paris premiere at the Opéra-Comique in 1911, Arbell and Clément repeated their roles, while the off-stage harpsichord in the minuet was played by Louis Diémer; the work on this occasion was paired in a double-bill with the premiere of Ravel's L'heure espagnole. The 1915 revival featured Arbell and Charles Fontaine, and in 1930 Suzanne Brohly, Hector Dufranne and Félix Vieuille led the cast; this made a total of 31 performances at the Opéra-Comique.

The premiere in the USA was presented by The Opera Department of the Peabody Conservatory of Music, in Baltimore, on March 24, 1972. The Artistic Director and conductor was Robert Lawrence. Thérèse was sung by Saralynn Molliver, Andre Thorel by William Martin (James Meeks sung the following night) and Armand de Clerval by Douglas Dunnel (Lanne Vining sung the following night).

The next US public performance of the work was presented by Amato Opera on 1 June 1985 with piano accompaniment and featured Caryn Lerner, James Landers and Roger Hayden in the principal roles. A slightly abridged concert version of the opera was presented in New York in 2007 featuring Julie De Vaere in the title role. The US West Coast premiere of the complete opera was presented in concert on 24 April 2013 at La Sierra University in Riverside, California featuring Cynthia Jansen, Kevin St. Clair and Aram Barsamian in the principal roles.

Several opera companies in Europe produced Thérèse to coincide with the bicentenary of the French Revolution including Monte Carlo (with Margarita Zimmermann in the title role), Saint-Etienne and Krefeld. A concert revival on 21 July 2012 at the Festival de Radio France et Montpellier led to the release of a recording in April 2013. It featured Nora Gubisch, Charles Castronovo and Étienne Dupuis in the leading roles and was conducted by Alain Altinoglu. The Wexford Festival gave it on a double-bill with La Navarraise in 2013 with Nora Sourouzian in the title role, conducted by Carlos Izcaray.

Role	Voice type	Premiere Cast, 7 February 1907 (Conductor: Léon Jehin)
Thérèse	mezzo-soprano	Lucy Arbell
Armand de Clerval	tenor	Edmond Clément
Morel	baritone	Victor Chalmin
André Thorel	bass	Hector Dufranne
City official	baritone	
Officer	tenor	Gluck
Another officer		
A male and a female voice offstage; chorus: Soldiers.

== Synopsis ==
The story takes place during the French Revolution and concerns Thérèse, who is torn between duty and affection, between her husband André Thorel, a Girondist, and her lover, the nobleman Armand de Clerval. Although she had decided to follow her lover into exile, when her husband is being led to execution she shouts "Vive le roi!" (Long live the king!) amid the frenzied crowd and is dragged to her husband's side and marched to the guillotine.

=== Act 1 ===
October 1792. Clagny, near Versailles, France

In order to escape the wrath of the Revolution, the Marquis de Clerval, Armand, has fled France. His childhood friend, André, the son of the steward of the Clerval castle and now a Girondist revolutionary representative, has bought the chateau at an auction in order to be able to restore it to its rightful owner, Armand, after the Revolution. Unbeknownst to him, André’s young wife, Thérèse, and his friend Armand are in love.

Watching the soldiers go off to war, Thérèse tells André that because of his political activities and duties as a Girondist representative, she is often left alone and fears that one day he may fall victim to the rage of the revolutionaries. She dreads returning to Paris and wishes they could get away from the fury of the revolution. Sensing that there might be something else that is making her so anxious, André asks his wife if her heart belongs to him entirely. Thérèse responds defensively that she would not be so ungrateful as to not love him: after all, she was a penniless orphan girl and thanks to him she is now the wife of a Girondist, a representative. Her duty, she tells him, is to ensure his happiness. André responds that she is the very essence of his happiness and that he wants nothing more than to live beside her.

Left alone, Thérèse muses that she venerates the good, kind and devoted André, but she is still in love with Armand. She recalls their last meeting – the previous summer, in that very place – where they bid each other farewell before he fled France.

Armand returns to the chateau incognito and, alone with Thérèse, tries to rekindle their former love. She rebuffs him, telling him that she owes everything to her husband André, and her duty is to be by his side. Armand is almost recognized by the revolutionaries, but André vouches for him and offers him asylum under his roof.

=== Act 2 ===
June 1793. Paris, France

A few months later, the situation has become much worse. King Louis XVI has been executed five months prior and the Girondists are falling out of favor. Every day, more people are tried by the revolutionary court and sentenced to death. Thérèse bemoans the fact that they are stuck in the middle of this horror and wishes they could be far away. Sensing that she is concerned for Armand's safety, André tries to calm her down by saying that no one would suspect him, a representative, to be hiding a nobleman in his home. Yes, it is dangerous, he says, but he has a duty to protect his friend. He has secured a letter of safe conduct for Armand, with which he will be able to leave France and thus escape the Reign of Terror. André tells Thérèse that once Armand is safely out of the country, the two of them will be able to move out to the country, away from the horror currently surrounding them, and will live peacefully.

At this moment their friend Morel enters with terrible news: the growing wrath of the mob below has turned towards the Girondists. André feels that it is his duty to be alongside his comrades. Before leaving, he tells Armand that he may not be able to protect him for much longer and arranges for him to leave the country. He bids his friend and Thérèse farewell and goes down to the street to join the Girondists. Alone, Armand tries to persuade Thérèse to flee with him, to escape the horror of the Revolution and live happily together. After some hesitation, Thérèse finally agrees, but at this moment Morel enters and tells them that André has been arrested and is being led to the guillotine. Thérèse urges Armand to leave first and promises to meet him later and then flee the country. Left alone, she watches André as he is being led towards the guillotine. Torn between her love for Armand and her sense of duty towards André, she finally makes the decision to lean out the window and scream "Long Live the King!" The enraged revolutionaries rush in and arrest her; Thérèse takes her place next to her husband, as the two are led to their execution.

== Recordings ==
- 1973: first commercial recording of the opera (Decca) with Huguette Tourangeau, Ryland Davies, Louis Quilico, conducted by Richard Bonynge.
- 1981: Orfeo label, featuring Agnes Baltsa as Thérèse, Francisco Araiza as Armand and George Fortune as André, conducted by Gerd Albrecht.
- 2012: Radio France/Palazzetto Bru Zane/Ediciones Singulares, with Nora Gubisch, Charles Castronovo and Étienne Dupuis, Alain Altinoglu conducting the Chorus and Orchestra of the Opéra national de Montpellier,
