= Ariane (Massenet) =

Opera by Jules Massenet

- Opera by Jules Massenet
- Poster by Albert Maignan for the opera's première
- Librettist: Catulle Mendès
- Language: French
- Based on: Ariadne
- Premiere: 31 October 1906; Palais Garnier, Paris

Ariane is an opera in five acts by Jules Massenet to a French libretto by Catulle Mendès after Greek mythology (the tale of Ariadne). It was first performed at the Palais Garnier in Paris on 31 October 1906, with Lucienne Bréval in the title role.

== History ==
The subject of Ariadne was widely-used in opera during the Baroque and early Classical periods and then in the 20th century. The Massenet-Mendès version is one of very few which depicts the heroine and Theseus on Crete and then on Naxos. Massenet was publicly happy with his collaboration with Mendès, but his biographer claims that he disliked his librettist, whose words have been condemned by many critics; for example "Ariane suffers from a long, heavy libretto in the French Classical tradition by Catulle Mendès that contains much garlanded verse but little in the way of credible emotional realism". At the head of the score, Mendès offers quotes from his inspiration: Ovid, Racine and Thomas Corneille.

Although not a proper sequel, as Ariane dies in both pieces, Massenet's later opera, Bacchus is a companion to Ariane, containing a number of common characters and having the same librettist. Ariane has never maintained popularity and belongs to Massenet's later works which are largely neglected. The piece did, however, inspire this quote from French composer Gabriel Fauré: "Ariane, a noble, great and moving work..." The opera was performed during Massenet's life-time, then was dropped from the repertoire, receiving only limited revivals in 1937 (21 February and 27 August 1937) at the Paris Opéra. The 1937 cast had Germaine Lubin in the title role, Georges Thill as Thésée, Maryse Ferrer as Phèdre, Ketty Lapeyrette as Perséphone, with Martial Singher also in the cast, conducted by Paul Paray. Ariane was seen at La Monnaie Brussels on 23 November 1907 and had 23 performances in total through 1908; the cast included Claire Croiza as Perséphone.

It received performances in a new production at the Massenet Festival in Saint-Étienne on 9 November 2007, directed by Jean-Louis Pichon, conducted by Laurent Campellone. One critic noted, that it is one of the most Wagnerian of Massenet's operas.

One critic for the 1930s revival commented that one should "not look for what Massenet clearly did not put in the score", but noting the conventional first act, weaknesses in the ballet and the last two acts, praised the invocation to Cypris, Ariane's plea to Phèdre, the death of Phèdre and the scene with Perséphone. Another critic discerns the influence of Gluck and Berlioz in the score, "especially in Ariadne’s visit to the underworld in Act 4 and her final death scene in Act 5" and found Massenet's "sound description of the sea [is] especially impressive. Undulating strings and pounding brass whip up a near storm at the beginning of the opera, while Sirens beguile Theseus’s sailors with exquisitely seductive vocal lines". Nonetheless he found the "rhythmic motifs, choral writing and orchestral textures... recognizably by Massenet. The final scene uses a theme from his concert overture Phèdre of 1873.

== Roles ==
Role	Voice type	Premiere Cast Conductor: Paul Vidal
Ariane	soprano	Lucienne Bréval
Thésée	tenor	Lucien Muratore
Périthoüs	baritone	Jean-François Delmas
Perséphone	mezzo-soprano	Lucy Arbell
Phèdre	soprano	Louise Grandjean
Cypris	soprano	Marcelle Demougeot
Eunoé	soprano	Berthe Mendès
Chromis	soprano	Antoinette Lauté-Brun
Phéréklos	baritone	Henri Stamler
Native chief	baritone	Pierre Triadou

== Synopsis ==
The story is based on the mythology surrounding Theseus and the sisters Ariane and Phèdre. The two sisters are both in love with Theseus, yet he chooses Phèdre over Ariane. When Phèdre is killed by the toppled statue of Adonis, Ariane travels to the underworld to beg Perséphone for her sister's resurrection. Softened by Ariane's offering of roses, Perséphone complies and Phèdre returns to earth. Theseus is then made to choose between the sisters again and once more chooses Phèdre, abandoning Ariane on the shore of Naxos. Distraught, she is lured into the sea by the voices of the beckoning sirens.

== Recording ==
Two concert performances in January 2023 at Munich’s Prinzregententheater were issued on three CDs as a complete recording by Palazzetto Bru Zane, with Amina Edris (Ariane), Kate Aldrich (Phèdre), Jean-François Borras (Thésée), Jean Sebastien Bou (Pirithoüs), Julie Robard-Gendre (Perséphone), and Marianne Croux, Judith van Wanroij, Yoann Dubruque and Philippe Estèphe in supporting roles, with the choir of Bavarian Radio and Munich Radio Orchestra conducted by Laurent Campellone.
