= Montaud (Loire) =

Suburb of Saint-Etienne, France

Montaud (French pronunciation: [mɔ̃to]) is a former French commune of the Loire on the north west of the city of Saint-Étienne. It was created during the French revolution then included in Saint-Étienne in 1855.

== History ==
Monte Alto appears in 14th century texts. In the 19th century the commune saw industrial expansion in the form of coal mining and of ribbon-making. Sainte-Marie mine, atop Crêt de Montaud, was working until 1960.

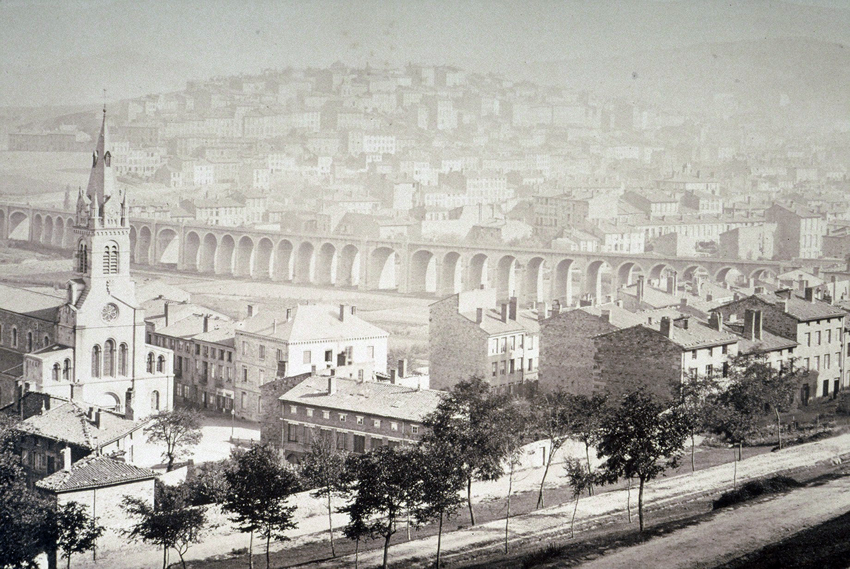
View of the suburb, c. 1860.

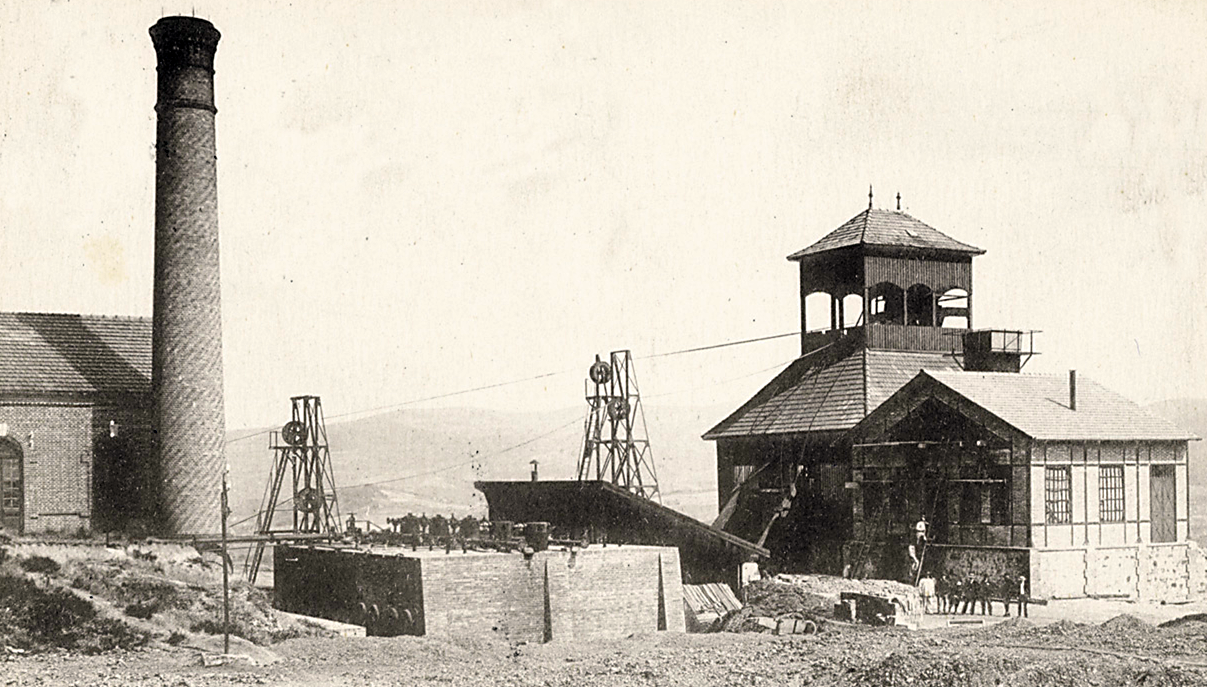
Sainte-Marie mine c. 1880.

About 1840 a railway was built to connect Châteaucreux to Montaud station for transporting coal. At this time a scythe factory gave work to around 500 employees and was the main place for under 14s to work.

Massenet's birthplace in Montaud, photographed c. 1908

Montaud was the birthplace of the composer Jules Massenet, at 4 place Marengo in 1842, whose father had set up a local scythe factory in 1838.

== See also ==
- Communes of the Loire department
