= Rodney Milnes =

British musicologist and music critic

Rodney Milnes Blumer OBE (26 July 1936 – 5 December 2015) was an English music critic, musicologist, writer, translator and broadcaster, with a particular interest in opera. He wrote under the professional name of Rodney Milnes.

== Life and career ==
Milnes was born in Stafford, where his father was a surgeon. He learnt the piano as a child, to the level of playing the early Beethoven sonatas, and later recalled accompanying a fellow Oxford student in Winterreise at the Holywell Music Room.

Milnes attended Rugby School and studied history at Christ Church, Oxford University. He was a member of the Oxford University Opera Club, taking part in The Fair Maid of Perth in 1955 (with Dudley Moore among the first violins and David Lloyd-Jones in the chorus), and Smetana's The Secret in 1956, which featured the debut of Janet Baker as Panna Róza, both conducted by Jack Westrup. He also sang Ko-Ko in a concert performance during his Oxford days.

He undertook National Service after Oxford, serving in the Education Corps in West Germany, and finishing with the rank of sergeant. The years also enabled him to hear opera around Germany. From then during the 1960s he worked in several publishers.

Milnes was the opera critic for Harpers and Queen (1970–90), opera critic of The Spectator (1988–90), Evening Standard (1990–92), and Chief Opera Critic The Times (1992–2002). He was associate editor of Opera from 1976, deputy editor from 1984, and editor between 1986–99. There he honed his reputation as a "trenchant and entertaining writer, with a strong background in literature and theatre, and wide musical sympathies". In his final editorial for Opera, Milnes wrote:

"Thank you to all of those who have written in outrage cancelling their subscriptions, and then not done so. Thank you to all readers for being so patient with my bêtes noires. I know I’m wrong about surtitles (like hell I am) and they’re here to stay. So are sponsors and their lordly, impertinent ways. Call me old-fashioned, but I don’t really feel that a century that starts with Lilian Baylis and ends with Chris Smith is one that has seen a lot in the way of progress".

Milnes translated opera librettos under his original name, including Rusalka, The Jacobin, Osud, Don Quixote (Paisiello/Henze), Pollicino (Henze), Undine, Giovanna d'Arco, Die drei Pintos and Tannhäuser.

Milnes contributed entries on Massenet and his operas in the Grove Dictionary of Music and Musicians. He was consultant editor for the Viking Opera Guide, and revised and updated A Concise History of Opera in 1987. He was a contributor to Opera on Record Vol 1 (Carmen), Vol 2 (Thaïs and Don Quichotte) and Vol 3 (The stage works of Weill).

For BBC Radio he was a regular contributor to the Building a Library feature in Record Review; in Just the part and In Repertory he talked to opera singers about particular roles they have made their own, and in 2001 introduced a 14-part series Performing Verdi.

Milnes was a Knight of the Order of the White Rose; in January 2002 he was awarded an OBE for services to journalism and music. He spent his final years in Gloucestershire to live near his sister. He was unmarried.
