= Don Quichotte =

Opera by Jules Massenet

- Opera by Jules Massenet
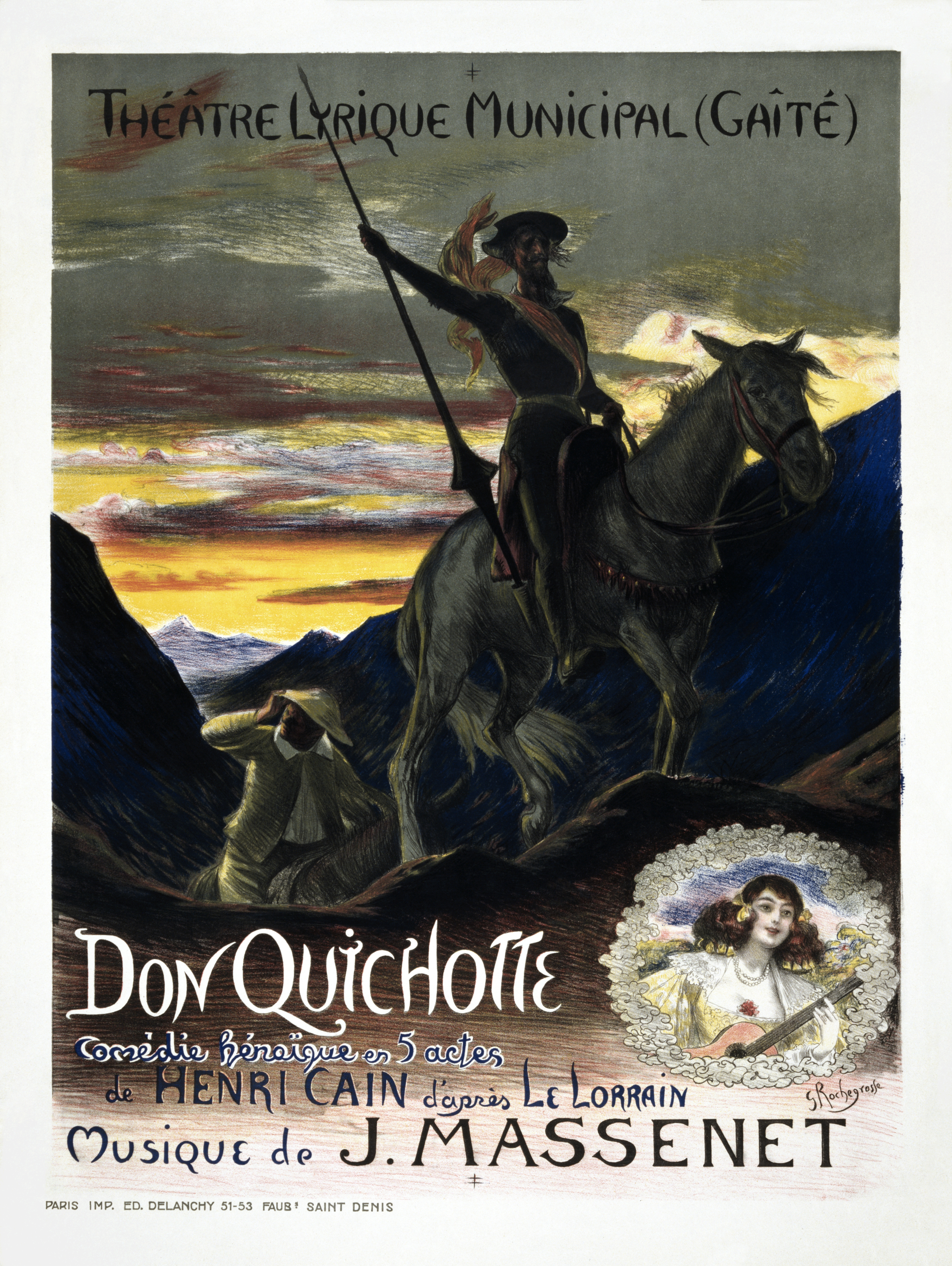
- Poster by Georges Rochegrosse for the first Paris production, at the Gaîté-Lyrique in 1910
- Librettist: Henri Caïn
- Language: French
- Based on: Le chevalier de la longue figure by Jacques Le Lorrain
- Premiere: 19 February 1910; Opéra de Monte-Carlo

Don Quichotte (Don Quixote) is an opera in five acts by Jules Massenet to a French libretto by Henri Caïn. It was first performed on 19 February 1910 at the Opéra de Monte-Carlo.

Massenet's comédie héroïque, like many dramatized versions of the story of Don Quixote, relates only indirectly to the novel Don Quixote by Miguel de Cervantes. The immediate inspiration was Le chevalier de la longue figure, a play by the poet Jacques Le Lorrain first performed in Paris in 1904. In this version of the story, the simple farm girl Aldonza (Dulcinea) of the original novel becomes the more sophisticated Dulcinée, a flirtatious local beauty inspiring the infatuated old man's exploits.

== Composition history ==
Conceiving originally Don Quichotte to be a three-act opera, Massenet started to compose it in 1909 at a time when, suffering from acute rheumatic pains, he spent more of his time in bed than out of it, and composition of Don Quichotte became, in his words, a sort of "soothing balm". In order to concentrate on that new work, he interrupted composition of another opera Bacchus. Despite its five acts, there is under two hours of music in the opera.

Massenet identified personally with his comic-heroic protagonist, as he was in love with Lucy Arbell who sang Dulcinée at the first performance. He was then 67 and died just two years later. The role of Don Quichotte was one of the most notable achievements of the Russian bass Feodor Chaliapin, for whom the role was specifically conceived. The opera was one of six commissioned from Massenet by Raoul Gunsbourg for the Opéra de Monte-Carlo.

== Performance history ==
Don Quichotte was premiered in Monte Carlo on 19 February 1910, followed by stagings in Brussels that May, and Marseille and Paris in December 1910. Its première at the Opéra-Comique in October 1924 was followed by over 60 performances during the succeeding quarter of a century; Arbell sang in the 1924 and 1931 runs, and Chaliapin appeared there in 1934, while the conductors included Maurice Frigara, Paul Bastide and Roger Désormière.

In 1912 it was presented at the French Opera House in New Orleans (27 January), and the London Opera House (17 May). On 15 November 1913 the work was presented in Philadelphia. The Chicago premiere of the work (by the Chicago Grand Opera Company) took place at the Auditorium Theatre on 27 January 1914 and featured Vanni Marcoux and Mary Garden in the lead roles. Marcoux reprised the title role in Chicago with Coe Glade during the inaugural season of the Chicago Civic Opera House in December 1929. Don Quichotte received its premiere in Budapest in 1917, and the Opéra-Comique in Paris presented it in 1924 with Marcoux in the title role, Arbell and Fugère; Chaliapin sang it there in 1934. The Metropolitan Opera in New York City performed it nine times in 1926, but after devastating reviews of those performances in particular, and criticisms of Massenet's music in general by Lawrence Gilman in the Herald Tribune, the opera has never been revived at the Met. It was performed by the Opera Company of Boston (staged and conducted by Sarah Caldwell) in 1974 (with Noel Tyl, Donald Gramm, and Mignon Dunn), and the New York City Opera in 1986.

Besides frequent and periodic revivals at Monte Carlo and in France, it was also shown with great success in Italy (Catania in 1928, Turin in 1933 (Teatro Regio), Bologna in 1952, Venice in 1982, Florence in 1992). The Polish premiere was at the Kraków Opera in 1962, and Baltic State Opera premiere was in 1969. Nicolai Ghiaurov sang the title role to great acclaim at Lyric Opera of Chicago in 1974 and again in 1981, and Lyric Opera mounted the work again in 1993 with Samuel Ramey, Jean-Philippe Lafont and Susanne Mentzer. The first revival in Britain since 1912 was given by English National Opera in October 1994, with Richard Van Allan as Quixote. The production was presented again in 1996.

More recently, it was staged in Paris in 2000 (with Samuel Ramey in the title role), in San Diego in 2009 starring Ferruccio Furlanetto and Denyce Graves, in 2010 in Brussels with José van Dam and in Palermo with Ferruccio Furlanetto and Arutjun Kotchinian. The opera was performed at the Seattle Opera in February/March 2011 with John Relyea in the title role. In 2012 the Mariinsky Theatre of Saint Petersburg staged a new production, also featuring Furlanetto. The Lyric Opera of Chicago mounted a newly-staged production in 2016 with sets and costumes from the San Diego production., and the work was also staged by Opera Australia in Sydney in March 2018.

== Roles ==
Roles, voice types, premiere cast
Role	Voice type	Premiere cast, 19 February 1910 Conductor: Léon Jehin
La belle Dulcinée (The beautiful Dulcinea)	contralto	Lucy Arbell
Don Quichotte (Don Quixote)	bass	Feodor Chaliapin
Sancho (Sancho Panza)	baritone	André Gresse
Pedro (travesti)	soprano	Brienz
Garcias (travesti)	soprano	Brielga
Rodriguez	tenor	Edmond Warnéry
Juan	tenor	Charles Delmas
Chief of the Bandits	spoken	Delestang
Two valets	baritones	Thiriat & Borie
Four bandits	spoken	
Chorus: Gentry, Friends of Dulcinée, Ladies, Bandits, Crowds.

== Synopsis ==
Place: Spain

=== Act 1 ===
A square in front of Dulcinée's house

A festival is being celebrated. Four hopeful admirers of Dulcinée serenade her from the street. Dulcinée appears and explains philosophically that being adored is not enough, "Quand la femme a vingt ans" (When a woman is twenty). She withdraws and a crowd, largely of beggars, acclaim the arrival of the eccentric knight Don Quichotte (riding on his horse Rossinante) and his comic squire Sancho Panza (on a donkey). Delighted by their attention, Don Quichotte tells a reluctant Sancho to throw them money. After the crowd disperse, Don Quichotte himself serenades Dulcinée, "Quand apparaissent les étoiles" (When the stars begin to shine) but he is stopped by Juan, a jealous admirer of the local beauty. A sword fight follows, interrupted by Dulcinée herself. She is charmed by Don Quichotte's antique attentions, chides Juan for his jealousy and sends him away. The old man offers her his devotion and a castle. She suggests instead that he might retrieve a pearl necklace of hers stolen by Ténébrun, the bandit chief. He undertakes to do so, and Dulcinée quickly rejoins her men friends.

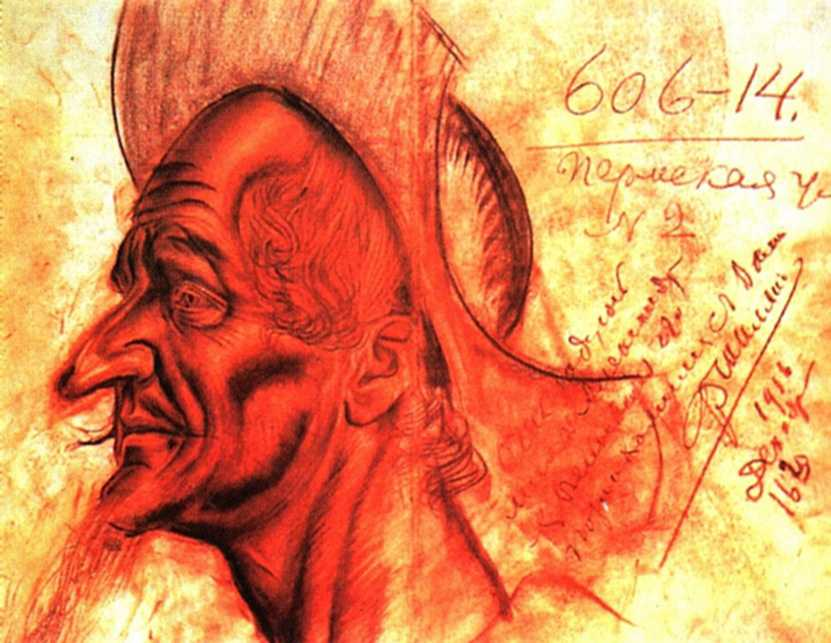
Feodor Chaliapin as Don Quichotte by Alexandre Jacovleff

=== Act 2 ===
In the countryside

A misty morning, Don Quichotte and Sancho enter with Rossinante and the donkey. Don Quichotte is composing a love poem. Sancho delivers a grand tirade against their expedition, against Dulcinée, and against women in general. "Comment peut-on penser du bien de ces coquines" (How can anyone think anything good of those hussies). The mists disperse revealing a line of windmills that Don Quichotte takes for a group of giants. To Sancho's horror, Don Quichotte attacks the first one, only to be caught up in one of the sails and hoisted up in the air.

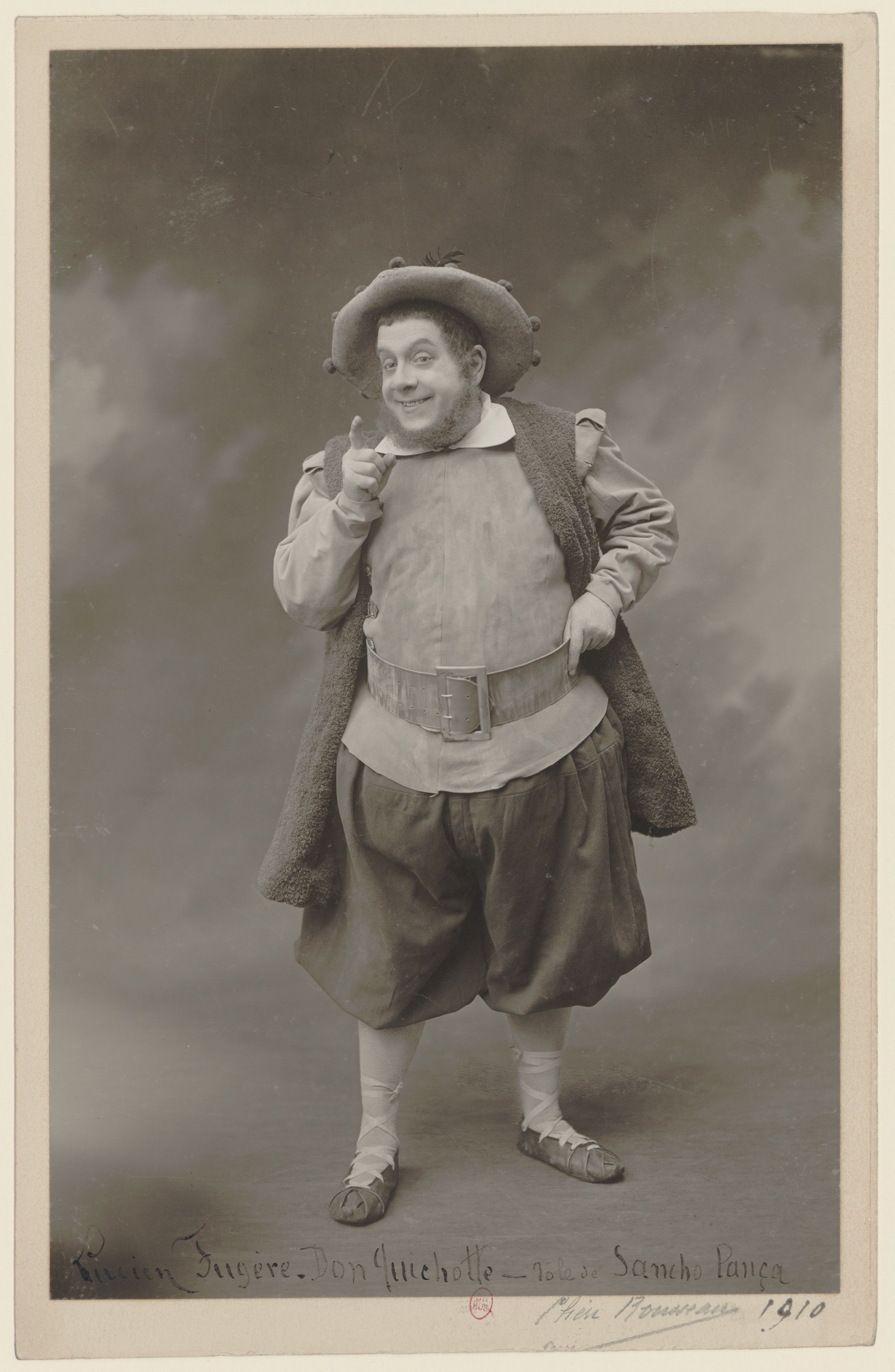
Lucien Fugère as Sancho, Paris 1910.

=== Act 3 ===
In the mountains

Dusk, Don Quichotte believes they are getting close to the bandits. Sancho goes to sleep while Don Quichotte stands guard. The bandits suddenly appear and after a brief fight take the knight prisoner. Sancho escapes. Surprised by the defiance of the old man, the bandits give him a beating and intend to kill him, however Don Quichotte's prayer "Seigneur, reçois mon âme, elle n'est pas méchante" (Lord receive my soul, it is not evil) moves Ténébrun, the bandit chief, to mercy. Don Quichotte explains his mission "Je suis le chevalier errant" (I am the Knight-errant), and the necklace is returned to him. The bandits ask for the blessing of the noble knight before he leaves.

=== Act 4 ===
The garden of Dulcinée's House

Music and dancing, a party is in progress, but Dulcinée is melancholy, "Lorsque le temps d'amour a fui" (When the time of love has gone). Rousing herself, she snatches a guitar and sings "Ne pensons qu'au plaisir d'aimer" (Think just of the pleasures of love). All retire to dinner. Sancho and Don Quichotte arrive. While waiting for Dulcinée, Sancho asks for his reward to which Don Quichotte responds with vague promises of an island, a castle, riches. Dulcinée and her party greet the knight and he returns the necklace to universal acclaim. However, when he asks her to marry him he is greeted with hysterical laughter. Taking pity, Dulcinée tells the others to leave, apologizes "Oui, je souffre votre tristesse, et j'ai vraiment chagrin à vous désemparer" (I share your sorrow and am truly sorry) but explains that her destiny, her way of life, is different from his. She kisses him on the forehead and leaves. But the company return to make fun of the old man. Sancho vigorously upbraids them, "Riez, allez, riez du pauvre idéologue" (Laugh, laugh at this poor idealist) and takes his master away.

=== Act 5 ===
A mountain pass in an ancient forest

A clear starry night, Don Quichotte is dying. He remembers once promising Sancho an island as his reward, and offers him an isle of dreams, "Prends cette île" (Take that isle). Nearing death, Don Quichotte looks up at a star shining brightly above and hears the voice of Dulcinée calling him to another world. Then he collapses as Sancho weeps over his body.

== Noted arias ==
- "Quand la femme a vingt ans" (Dulcinée) – act 1
- "Lorsque le temps d'amour a fui" (Dulcinée) – act 4
- "Riez, allez, riez du pauvre idéologue" (Sancho) – act 4
- "O mon maître, o mon grand!... Ecoute, mon ami" (Sancho, Don Quichotte) – act 5
