= Bacchus (opera) =

Opera by Jules Massenet

- Opera by Jules Massenet
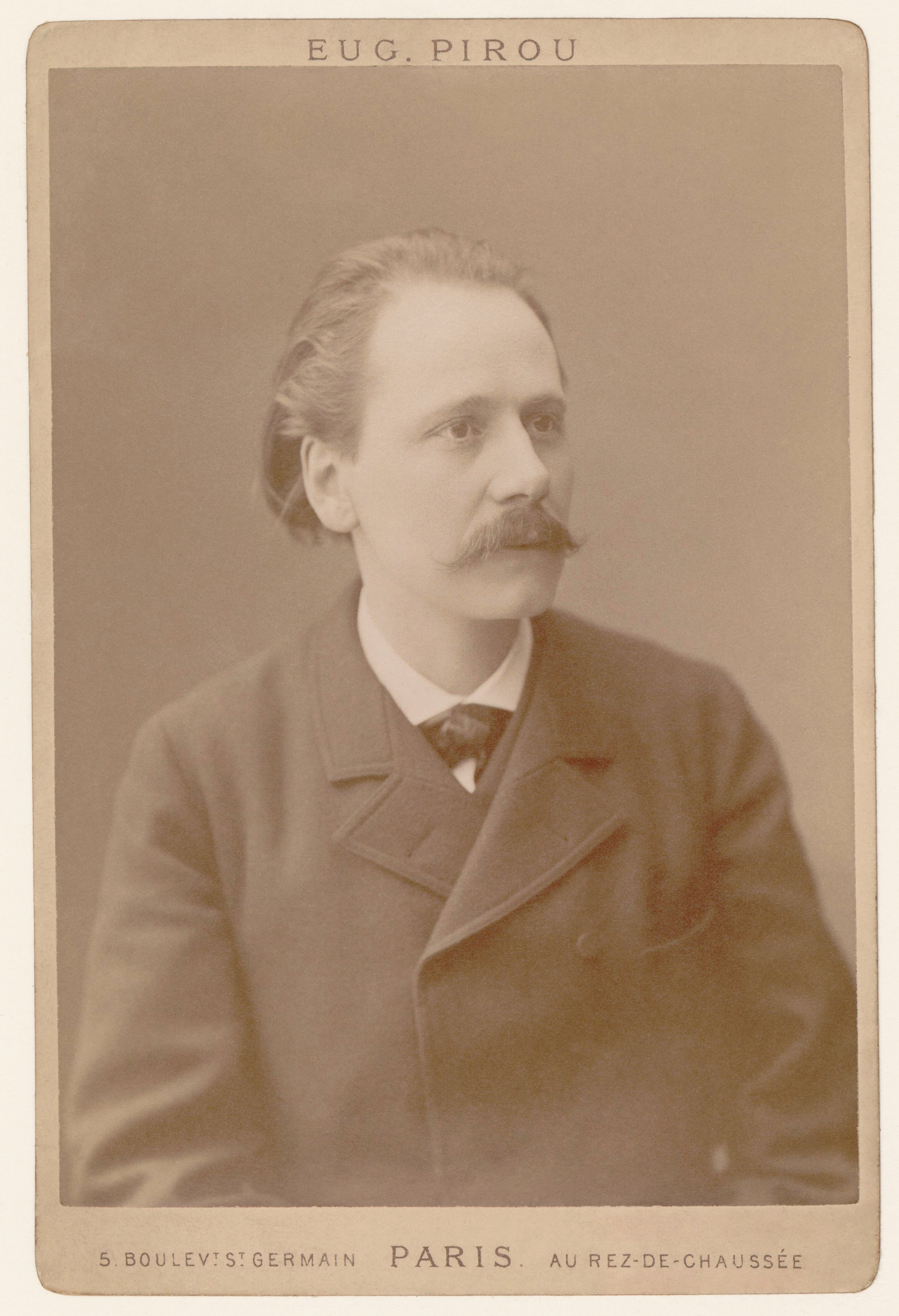
- The composer, Jules Massenet, photographed by Eugène Pirou, 1895
- Librettist: Catulle Mendès
- Language: French
- Based on: Bacchus and Ariadne
- Premiere: 5 May 1909; Palais Garnier, Paris

Bacchus is an opera in four acts by Jules Massenet to a French libretto by Catulle Mendès after Greek mythology. It was first performed at the Palais Garnier in Paris on 5 May 1909.

The story is based on the mythology surrounding Bacchus and Ariadne (Ariane). The Gods, among them the demi-god Bacchus, appear in human form in ancient India to attempt to persuade the people away from the pervading Buddhist influence. Ariane has followed them, convinced that Bacchus is in fact Theseus, her unrequited love. In the end, Ariane sacrifices herself to save humanity and in doing so, Bacchus becomes a God.

Although not a proper sequel, as Ariane dies in both pieces, Bacchus is a companion to Massenet's earlier opera, Ariane. Of Massenet's twenty-five operas, Bacchus is probably the least known, without a modern performance history or single modern recording. The ballet music has been recorded and issued appropriately by Naxos (company).

The story of this opera is also related to that of Ariadne auf Naxos from Richard Strauss.

== Roles ==
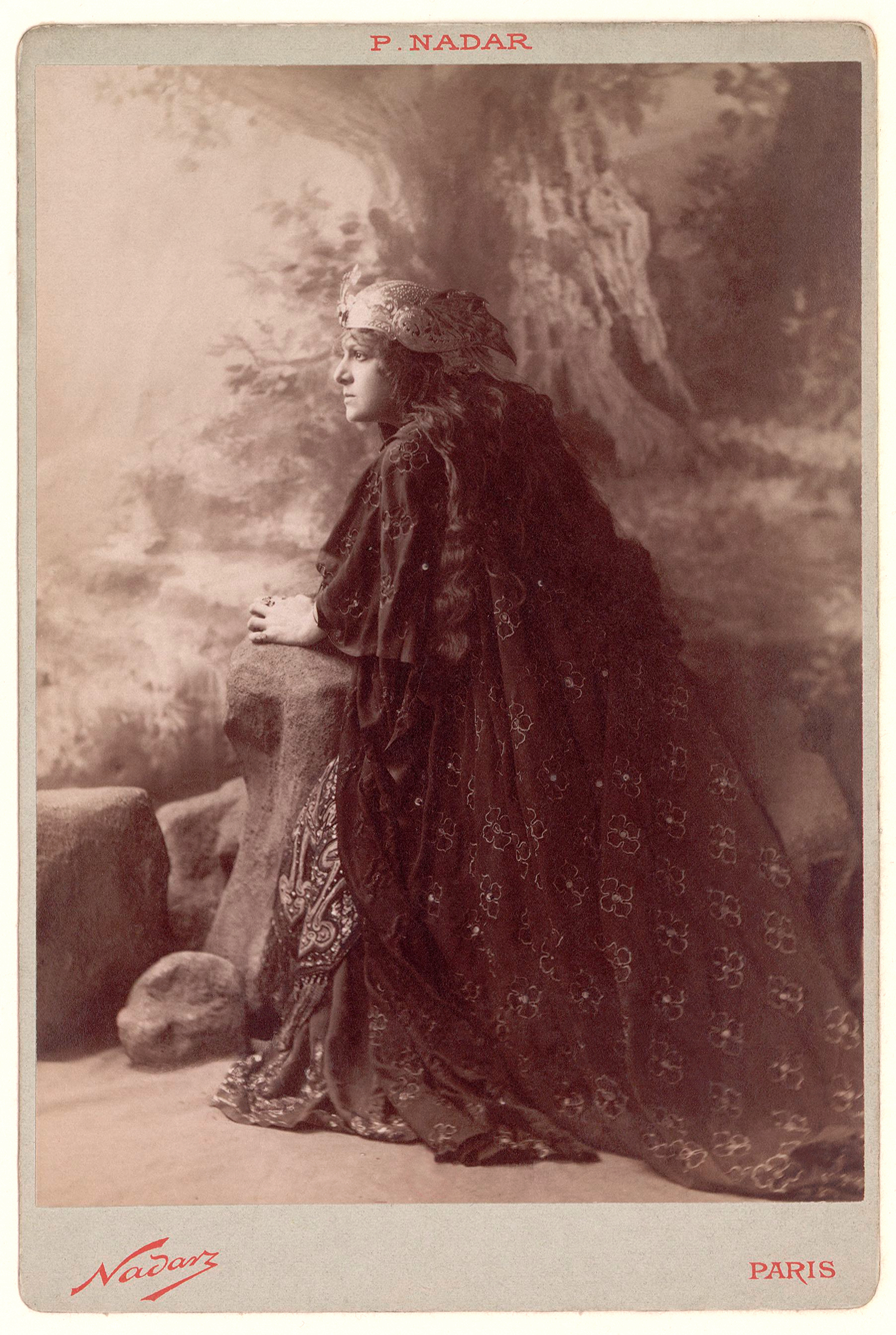
Lucy Arbell in the role of Queen Amahelli at the Théâtre de l'Opéra (Palais Garnier), during the creation of Bacchus in 1909. Photograph by Paul Nadar.

Role	Voice type	Première Cast Conductor: Henri Rabaud
Bacchus	tenor	Lucien Muratore
Ariane	soprano	Lucienne Bréval
Queen Amahelli	mezzo-soprano	Lucy Arbell
Révérend Ramavaçou (Note: Full name given at Mendès, Catulle; Massenet, Jules (1909). Bacchus. Paris: Au Ménestrel / Heugel et C^{ie}. pp. 30–1.)	bass	André Gresse
Kéléyï (Note: Written "Kéléyi" in the cast list, but Kéléyï everywhere else, e.g. Mendès, Catulle; Massenet, Jules (1909). Bacchus. Paris: Au Ménestrel / Heugel et C^{ie}. pp. Table of Contents.)	soprano	Antoinette Laute-Brun
Silène	baritone	Marcelin Duclos (Note: In the Act III ballet, Charles Javon substituted for Duclos. See Mendès, Catulle; Massenet, Jules (1909). Bacchus. Paris: Au Ménestrel / Heugel et C^{ie}. p. Front matter: Dances.)
Mahouda	baritone	Triadou
Pourna	tenor	Nansen
Ananda	baritone	Cerdan
Manthra, a mime	mute	Blanche Kerval
Clotho	spoken role	Brille
Perséphone	spoken role	Renée Parny
Antéros	spoken role	de Max
Chorus: Followers of Perséphone, Nuns, Monks, Warriors, Priests, Bassarides, Fauns, Bacchantes, Heavenly voices.

There are also a number of dance roles in the various ballets.

== List of musical numbers ==
=== Act I, The Underworld ===
- "Hélas!" - Voices of Spirits
- "Pourpre déchue, encens funèbres" - Perséphone
- Dance by the Spectres of the Roses (Note: In the Table of Contents, scenes without dialogue or vocal lines are generally (but not always) listed only by the main group performing them, in the same manner as the main singer is listed for the songs. The descriptions used here are summarised from the actions described in the score.)
- "Ariane n'est point chez les morts douloureux" - Companions of Perséphone
- "Tourne, fuseau du sort" - Clotho
- "Il n'est destin, hasards, ni volonté de l'homme" - Antéros
- An apparition (The travels of Bacchus and Ariane, as shown to Persephone and her companions)

=== Act II ===
Scene 1, in Nepal

- Arrival of the Beggar Monks to the Réverénd Ramavaçou
- "L'apparence n'est rien" - Réverénd Ramavaçou
- "Quel brut déchire le silence?" - Réverénd Ramavaçou
- "Io! Io! Pœan! Evohé!" - the tumult
- "Une tourbe énorme s'élance" - Pourna
- "Plein de toi, vigneron divin" - Silène
- "Il vacille!" - Réverénd Ramavaçou
- "Tu mens! L'eau du fleueve n'est pas verte" - Mahouda
- "Le Règle est blasphémée" - Amahelli
- "Cent viharas sacrés et vingt cités profanes" - Amahelli
- Invocation: "Très saint qui nous promis la paix définitive" - Amahelli
- "Dans l'âpre forêt de rocs et d'arbres tours" - Réverénd Ramavaçou
- Sacred chant: "O fils sans mère d'un père Dieu" - Voices of distant priests. Setting of an Ancient Greek Melody
- The Triumph of Bacchus
- "Mortels! La vie est dans le monde!" - Bacchus
- "N'est-il pas l'heure aussi qu'à l'épouse l'époux sourie?" - Ariane
- "Et je ris, doucement mourante, selon mes vœux" - Ariane
- "Roi, par fauves troupeaux, d'affreux géants camards hurlent" - Silène
- "Tant d'émoi pour quelque harde échappée" - Bacchus

Interlude: The Battle of the Monkeys

Scene 2: After the Battle

- "Vois! par l'arme de pierre et l'ongle et la mâchoire" - Réverénd Ramavaçou
- "Sortis enfin de leur torpeur" - Amahelli
- "Ah! je m'éveille! Un rêve!" - Ariane
- "Zeus immortel! Ton fils va-t-il devenir Dieu?" - Bacchus
- "Qu'il soit prisonnier!" - Amahelli

=== Act 3 ===
Scene 1: A Terrace of the Palace of the Sakias

- Prelude
- "Sur quel point de l'erreur ou de la connaissance" - Kéléyï
