= Désiré Defrère =

Belgian-born American baritone and stage director for operas

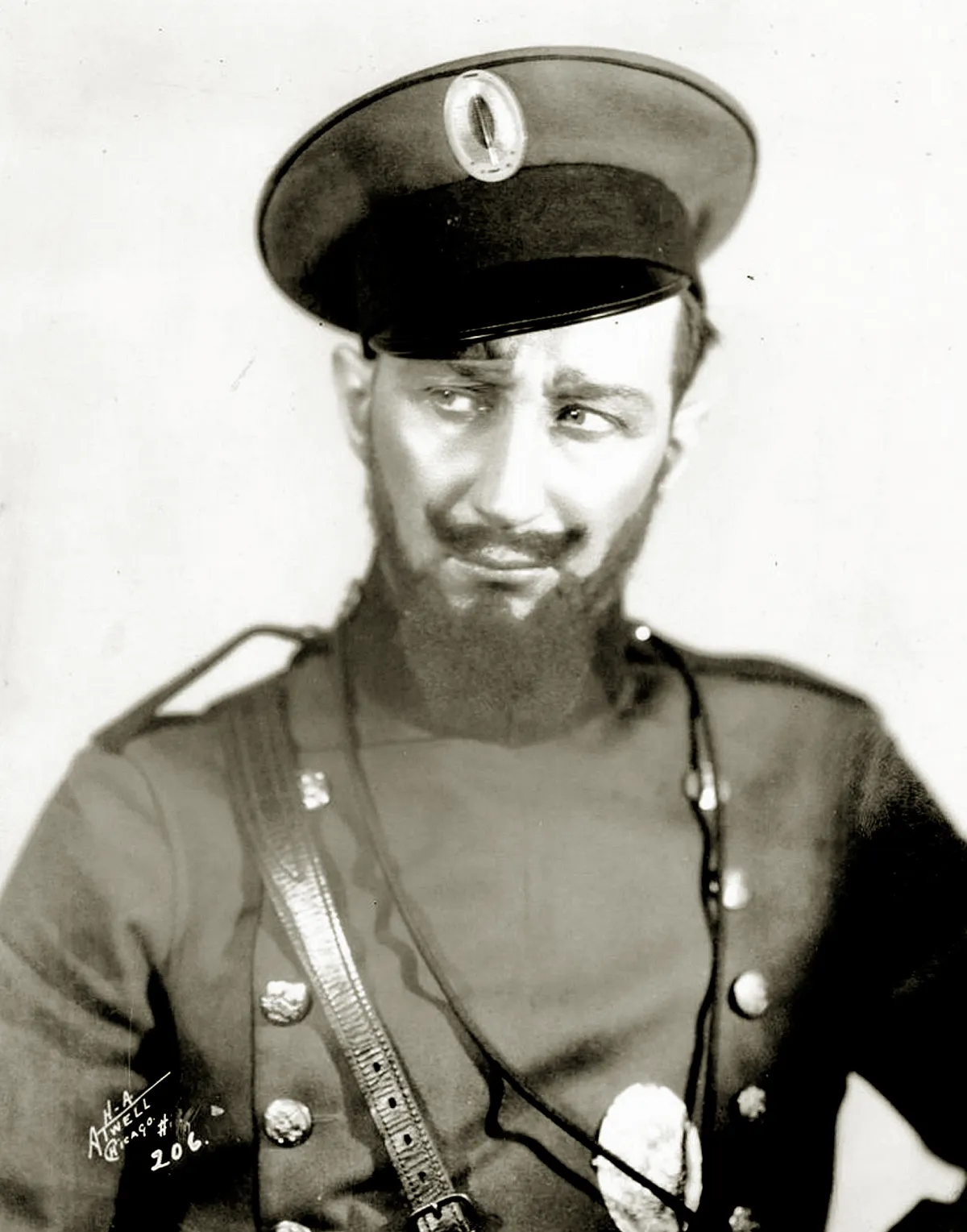
- Defrère as Pantalone in the original 1921 production of The Love for Three Oranges
- Born: February 22, 1888; Liege, Belgium
- Died: August 31, 1964 (aged 76); Freeport, New York, U.S.
- Occupations: Operatic baritone; Stage director; Pedagogue
- Organizations: Chicago Grand Opera Company; Metropolitan Opera; Academy of Vocal Arts

Désiré Defrère (February 22, 1888 – August 31, 1964) was a Belgian-born American baritone and stage director for operas. He was trained as a singer in the city of his birth at the Royal Conservatory of Liège. He began his career at the Opéra Royal de Wallonie shortly before appearing in a minor role at the Royal Opera House (ROH) in London in 1909. There he was scouted by Oscar Hammerstein I who brought the singer to America. In the United States he had a long career as an opera singer in Chicago with a variety of companies from 1910 to 1934. He also made guest appearances on the international stage, and was especially active as a recurring artist at the ROH in London and the Opéra-Comique in Paris.

Désiré had a lengthy career at the Metropolitan Opera (Met) as both a singer and director from 1934 to 1964, having previously sung at the Metropolitan Opera House in the 1914–1915 season as a resident artist and on tours from Chicago to New York with the Chicago Grand Opera Company during the 1910s. After 1938 he no longer sang in operas, and was entirely devoted to working as a stage director. He also staged operas at the Academy of Vocal Arts in Philadelphia where he was a member of the faculty.

== Early life and career ==
Désiré Defrère was born in Liege, Belgium, on February 22, 1888. He was trained as an opera singer at the Royal Conservatory of Liège and began his career as a resident artist at the Opéra Royal de Wallonie. In 1909 he worked as a comprimario singer at the Royal Opera House in London. Oscar Hammerstein I recruited him from there for the Manhattan Opera House and brought Désiré to the United States. However, he never ended up singing with Hammerstein's company, and instead went to Chicago.

== Chicago Grand Opera Company ==
Multiple sources state that Désiré made his American debut with the Chicago Grand Opera Company (CGOC) in 1911, an organization then led by Andreas Dippel. However, newspapers from the period report that he first appeared with the company on November 9, 1910, as the Sculptor in Charpentier's Louise with Mary Garden in the title role. Later that same week he appeared with the company as Moralès in Bizet's Carmen with Armand Crabbé as Escamillo, Marguerite Sylva as Carmen, and Alice Zeppilli as Micaela. In December 1910 he performed the role of the Pony Express rider in the Chicago premiere of Puccini's La fanciulla del West with Carolina White as Minnie. He also performed the role of the Second Nazarene in Salome by R. Strauss during his first season in Chicago.

In February 1911 Désiré performed the role of the Sergeant in the world premiere of Victor Herbert and Joseph D. Redding's Natoma. That same month he gave his first performance at the Metropolitan Opera House in New York, touring to New York with the CPOC to perform once again with Mary Garden in Louise. He performed in several more operas with CPOC company at the Met in 1911, including Offenbach's The Tales of Hoffmann (as Hermann) and Carmen. He also toured with CPOC to the Lyric Opera House in Baltimore. Other roles he performed with CPOH in 1911 included the Buffoon in Massenet's Le jongleur de Notre-Dame, Wagner in Gounod' Faust, and Vatinius in Jean Nouguès's Quo Vadis.

In November 1911 Désiré appeared at the Metropolitan Opera House, Philadelphia (MOHP) as the Herald (a.k.a. "Le Surintendant des plaisirs") in that city's first staging of Massenet's Cendrillon. He repeated the role at the Met on another CPOH tour to New York in 1912, a trip which also featured Désiré as the second morra player in the first staging in the original Italian language of Wolf-Ferrari's Le donne curiose. That opera had previously been sung only in a German translation. He returned to MOHP in November 1913 to perform a small role in the United States premiere of Massenet's Don Quichotte.

Some of the other roles he performed with CPOH included both Vitellius and the High Priest in Massenet's Hérodiade (1913, with Julia Claussen), a young man in Wolf-Ferrari's I gioielli della Madonna (1913), Peter Schlémihl in The Tales of Hoffmann (1913), a soldier in Kienzl's Le Ranz des Vaches (1913, with Martha Winternitz-Dorda), Torello in Février's Monna Vanna (1914), and a Grail Knight in Wagner's Parsifal (1914). Around the time of the outbreak of World War I in June 1914, CPOH declared bankruptcy and cased operation.

== International performances and early Met performances ==
Between 1911 and 1914, and again from 1919 to 1920, Désiré performed at the Royal Opera House in London, mostly in minor roles. Some of the roles he performed at the ROH in this period included the servant in Massenet's Thaïs (1911, with Louise Edvina), the Second Philistine in Samson and Delilah by Saint-Saëns (1912, with Louise Kirkby Lunn as Delilah), Grégorio in Gounod's Roméo et Juliette (1913, with John McCormack as Romeo and Nellie Melba as Juliette), Bonzo in Puccini's Madama Butterfly (1914, with Emmy Destinn as Cio-Cio-San and Enrico Caruso as Pinkerton), Silvio in Leoncavallo's Pagliacci (1919 & 1920), Marco in Puccini's Gianni Schicchi (1920), Schaunard in Puccini's La bohème (1920), Cesare Angelotti in Puccini's Tosca (1920, with Gilda dalla Rizza), Torquemada in Ravel's L'heure espagnole (1920), and Guillot de Morfontaine in Massenet's Manon (1920, conducted by Thomas Beecham).

After the demise of CGOC, Defrère became a resident artist with the Metropolitan Opera (Met) for the 1914-1915 season. While he had previously sung at the company's opera house many times, it was always with the Chicago company of performers, and not with the Met's own company. He made his official debut with the Met in November 1914 as Bizet's Moralès to the Carmen of Geraldine Farrar with Arturo Toscanini conducting. At the end of the season he left New York after being offered a position at a new company being formed by Cleofonte Campanini in Chicago.

Defrère was a frequent guest artist at the Opéra-Comique in Paris with whom he appeared in thirty different seasons. He also performed as a guest at the Palacio de Bellas Artes in Mexico City, the Teatro Colón in Buenos Aires, and the Teatro Tapia in San Juan.

== Return to Chicago ==
In the fall of 1915, Defrère began performing with the newly created Chicago Opera Association (COA), making his debut with the company on November 18 as Johann in Massenet's Werther with Lucien Muratore in the title role. He sang Wagner to Muratore's Faust the following year. Some of the other roles he performed with COA included Barone Douphol in Verdi's La traviata (1916, with. Amelita Galli-Curci), Monsieur de Brétigny in Manon (1916, with Elizabeth Amsden), the Chief Herald in Isabeau (1917, with Rosa Raisa), Andrioli in Février's Gismonda (1919, with Mary Garden), Severus in Massenet's Cléopâtre (1919, on tour for New York premiere), Alfio in Cavalleria rusticana (1920), and Silvio in Pagliacci (1920).

On December 30, 1921, Defrère portrayed Pantalone in the world premiere of Prokofiev's The Love for Three Oranges at Chicago's Auditorium Theatre (AT). Not long after this, the COA company also dissolved due to financial problems. A new company was quickly established in January 1922 with many of the same artists. This company, the Chicago Civic Opera (CVO), presented seven seasons at the AT from 1922 to 1928, and three seasons at the Civic Opera House from 1928 until its demise in 1931. Defrère was an audience favorite with this company, and had a great success as the comic bandit Giacomo in the CVO's 1924 production of Auber's Fra Diavolo.

Other roles he performed with CVO included a mix of leading and supporting parts, among them Abimélech in Samson and Delilah, Andrey Shchelkalov in Mussorgsky's Boris Godunov, Dancairo in Carmen, Lescaut in Manon, Mercutio in Roméo et Juliette, the musician monk in Le jongleur de Notre-Dame, Schaunard in La bohème, and Valentin in Faust. In an emergency, Désiré once took over a minor woman's role in Alfano's Risurrezione and threw on the character dress's to replace a sick singer. The Chicago critic Francis Robinson was amazed at Désiré's ability to vocally provide the female role successfully as well as visually meet the demands of the role. He remained active in Chicago until the dissolution of the second Chicago Grand Opera Company in 1934.

== Return to the Met ==
In 1934 Defrère was engaged by the Metropolitan Opera in New York as both a stage director and a singer. He performed at the Met as a singer until 1938, taking on roles such as Valentin in Faust, Lescaut in Massenet's Manon, Mercutio in Roméo et Juliette, Silvio in Pagliacci, Ford in Verdi's Falstaff, and Telramund in WAgner's Lohengrin. A singer with exceptional vocal range, he once sang the highest tenor notes off-stage for a Met performance of Rigoletto when the on-stage leading tenor was vocally not able to sing them, a feat unusual for a baritone.

Désiré was a highly respected opera director and served as a staff stage director at the Met until his death in 1964. He was a highly productive director for the Met, and at one point was the director for 14 different productions running in a single season at that opera house. He also directed operas at the Academy of Vocal Arts in Philadelphia where he was a member of the faculty.

== Personal life ==
Désiré was married three times. He married his first wife, Millie Hithkin, in England. Their marriage ended in divorce in 1919 after a separation of five years. He married his second wife, soprano Hilda Burke, in 1931. His third wife was soprano Laura Castellano.

Désiré died in Freeport, New York, on August 31, 1964.

== Recordings ==
Recordings include a disc on the small American label Orchestrola and a complete recording of A. Thomas's Mignon (on Edward J. Smith's The Golden Age of Opera label), in which he sang the role of Laërte.
