= Charles Dalmorès =

French opera singer (1871–1939)

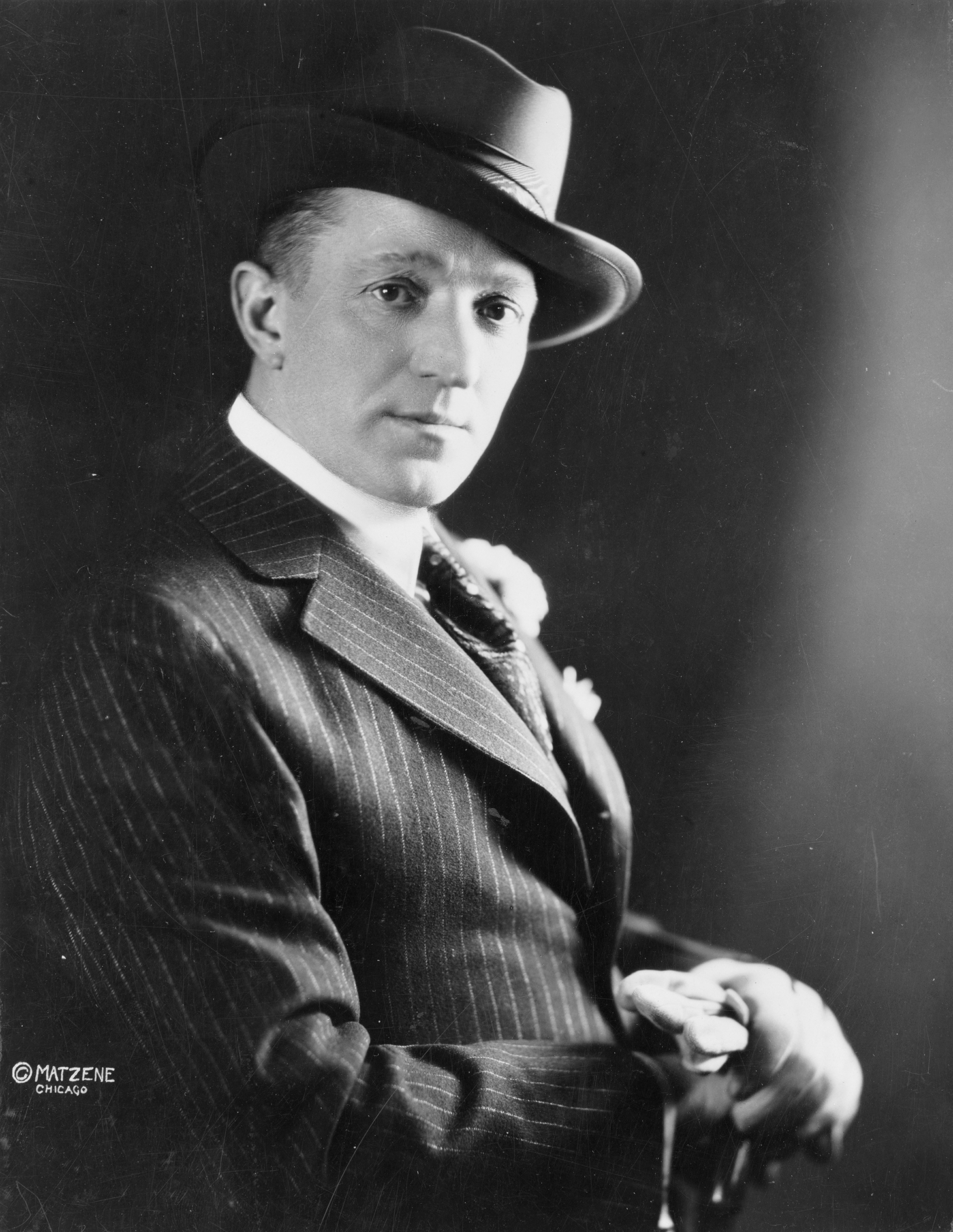
- Charles Dalmorès in 1916
- Born: Henri Alphonse Brin; January 1, 1871; Nancy, France
- Died: December 6, 1939 (aged 68); Hollywood, California
- Occupation: dramatic tenor

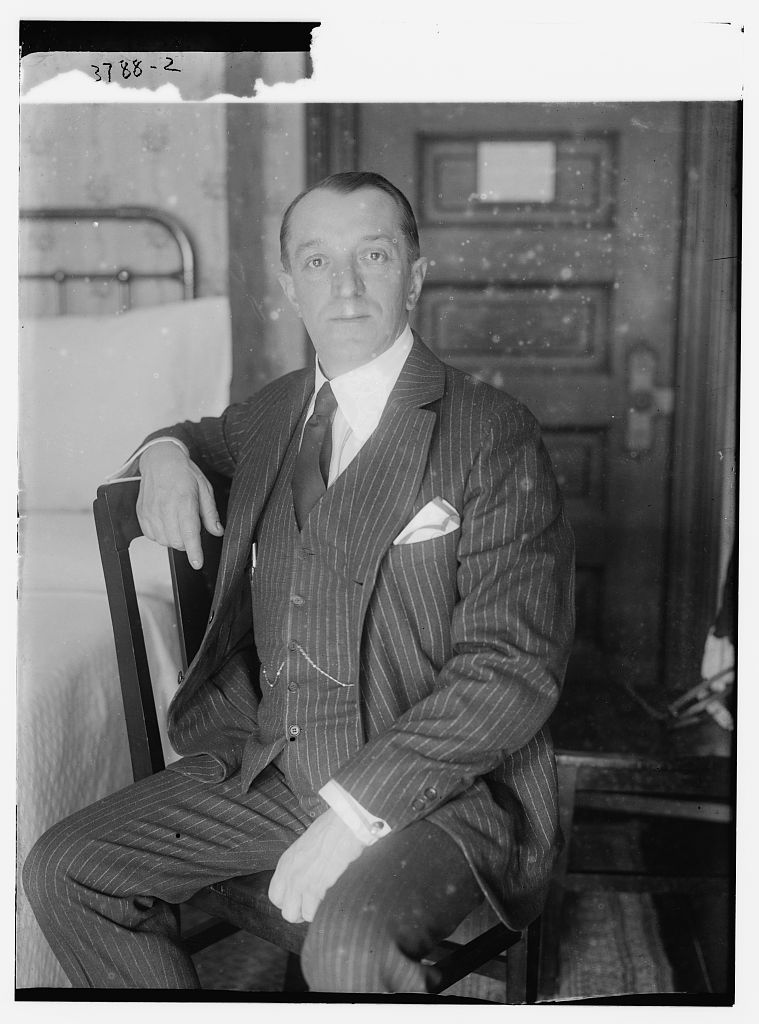
Charles Dalmorès in 1915

Charles Dalmorès (January 1, 1871 – December 6, 1939) was a French dramatic tenor. He enjoyed an international operatic career, singing to public and critical acclaim on both sides of the Atlantic during the first two decades of the 20th century.

== Biography ==
He was born on 1 January 1871 as Henri Alphonse Brin in Nancy, France. Dalmorès studied at the local conservatory of music and embarked on a career as a horn player with the Colonne and Lamoureux orchestras. In 1894, the Lyon Conservatory appointed him to a professorial position. Later, when his voice showed signs of promise, he abandoned instrumental music and took singing lessons in Paris. He made his operatic debut at the Théâtre des Arts in Rouen on 6 October 1899, in the heavy Wagnerian role of Siegfried. Following this, he spent six seasons with the Théâtre de la Monnaie in Brussels and sang with success at London's Royal Opera House, Covent Garden, in 1904–1905 and 1909–1911.

His American debut took place in Charles Gounod's Faust, in which he appeared with New York's Manhattan Opera Company on December 7, 1906. He spent four years with the company, specializing in French roles. For American audiences, he created the roles of Julien in Gustave Charpentier's Louise and Jean Gaussin in Jules Massenet's Sapho. Another famous part that he sang was Pelleas in Claude Debussy's Pelléas et Mélisande. He also appeared in numerous productions with the Philadelphia Opera Company between 1908 and 1910.

In 1910 Dalmorès was engaged by the Chicago Grand Opera Company with whom he performed until 1914. The company was highly active in Philadelphia as well as Chicago and often performed under the title of the Philadelphia-Chicago Grand Opera Company while in that city. With that company he notably performed the role of Vinicius in the United States premiere of Jean Nouguès's Quo vadis. In 1917 Dalmorès joined the Chicago Opera Association. There he sang for the first time the title roles in Richard Wagner's Parsifal and Tristan und Isolde. He also visited Germany and Austria on different occasions prior to the outbreak of World War I, performing Wagner in the original language in Berlin and other cities. In 1908–1909, he appeared at the Vienna Court Opera and undertook the role of Lohengrin, in Wagner's eponymous opera, at the 1908 Bayreuth Festival.

Tall for a tenor, he was praised by contemporary critics not only for his strong, steady, well-modulated voice but also for his impressive stage presence and acting. He made a number of gramophone records for the Victor Talking Machine Company which have been reissued on CD. Produced between 1907 and 1912, they confirm the excellence of his musicianship and the imposing power of his declamatory singing, although the top of his range sounds a bit constricted on these 100-year-old discs. One of his most celebrated records is a 1907 rendition of Manrico's aria "Ah! si, ben mio", from Giuseppe Verdi's Il trovatore, in which he displays an admirably smooth legato line, elegant phrasing and a splendid trill. He also recorded a few French songs as well as arias and duets from various operas, including Lohengrin, Giacomo Meyerbeer's Le prophète, Camille Saint-Saëns' Samson et Dalila, Jacques Offenbach's Les Contes d'Hoffmann, Georges Bizet's Carmen, Massenet's Grisélidis, and Gounod's Roméo et Juliette and Faust.

Dalmorès returned to France in 1918 but subsequently went back to the United States to live where he taught singing. He died in Hollywood, California, on December 6, 1939, at the age of 68.
