= Cleofonte Campanini =

Italian conductor

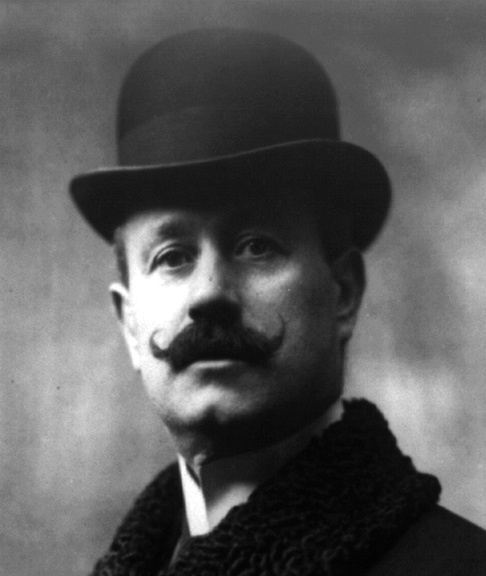
- Born: 1 September 1860; Parma, Italy
- Died: 19 December 1919 (aged 59); Chicago, Illinois
- Occupation: Conductor
- Relatives: Italo Campanini, brother

Cleofonte Campanini (1 September 1860 – 19 December 1919) was an Italian conductor and violinist. As a teenager he had a brief but successful career as a concert violinist in Italy and in theaters in Berlin and London. He abandoned the violin in favor of pursuing a career as a conductor, making his conducting debut in 1880 at the age of 20. He established himself as an opera conductor in Parma in the early 1880s, conducting several works which starred his brother, the tenor Italo Campanini.

In 1883 Campanini was appointed assistant conductor at the Metropolitan Opera for that company's inaugural season. He went on to establish himself as a leading opera conductor at theaters internationally, notably working on the conducting staffs of the Teatro Nacional de São Carlos (1888–1903) and La Scala (1903–1905), and appearing as a guest conductor at the Royal Opera House, Covent Garden, the Liceu, and the Teatro Colón among other opera houses. From 1906 until March 1909 he was artistic director of the Manhattan Opera Company. In November 1909 he was appointed the music director of the Chicago Grand Opera Company and then its successor, the Chicago Opera Association. He is remembered for conducting the world premieres of several operas which have become part of the standard opera repertory, including the premieres of Francesco Cilea's Adriana Lecouvreur at the Teatro Lirico in 1902 and Giacomo Puccini's Madama Butterfly at La Scala in 1904. He was married to the soprano Eva Tetrazzini.

== Early life and education ==
Born in Parma, Italy, on 1 September 1860, Cleofonte Campanini was the son of Francesco Campanini and Anna Rosa Campanini (née Alessandri). His father was a blacksmith. He studied music at the Parma Conservatory where he was a pupil of Giulio Ferrarini (violin) and Giusto Dacci (composition and counterpoint). He never graduated from the conservatory, abandoning his studies to pursue a career as a performer, although he continued to study violin privately with Ferrarini. He later studied with Antonio Bazzini in Milan.

== Violinist ==
In 1878 Campanini made his debut as a concert violinist, and he quickly earned a reputation on the Italian concert stage for his masterful interpretations of works by Ludwig van Beethoven, Arcangelo Corelli, Giuseppe Tartini, Henri Vieuxtemps, and Henryk Wieniawski. Soon after his debut in Italy, Campanini toured to Berlin and London as a concert violinist, and had particular success in several concerts at the Royal Opera House, Covent Garden. Back in Italy he regularly appeared in concerts organized by the Società del quartetto di Parma, and also served as the concert master in orchestras led by conductors Franco Faccio, Luigi Mancinelli, and Emilio Usiglio.

== Early conducting career ==
At the age of 20, Campanini abandoned his career as a violinist in favor of pursuing a career as a conductor. He made his conducting debut in 1880 at the Teatro Reinach in his native city. He had a critical triumph at the Teatro Regio, Parma in 1882 leading the musical forces in a production of Georges Bizet's Carmen. Many of the operas he conducted in Parma in the early 1880s starred his brother, the tenor Italo Campanini.

In 1883 Campanini was invited to New York City to join the staff of the newly created Metropolitan Opera for its inaugural season as an assistant conductor. He conducted one opera in the Met's first season: Arrigo Boito's Mefistofele. In 1884 he returned to Italy, and that year he was appointed as the music director and conductor of a series of orchestral concerts at the Turin World's Fair of 1884, one of which featured Arturo Toscanini as the cello soloist. He spent the next several years working as a guest conductor in opera houses and theaters internationally, including operas staged at the Liceu in Barcelona, the Teatro Real in Madrid, and the Teatro Colón in Buenos Aires. In 1888 he returned to the United States to lead the American premiere of Giuseppe Verdi's Otello at the Academy of Music. Desdemona was sung by soprano Eva Tetrazzini, the sister of Luisa Tetrazzini, who Campanini later married in 1890.

From 1888 through 1903 Campanini worked on the conducting staff of the Teatro Nacional de São Carlos in Lisbon. At that theatre he conducted the world premieres of Augusto Machado's Mario Wetter (1898) and Alfredo Keil's Serrana (1899) (considered the best Portuguese opera) with his wife Eva in the leading roles. He made his conducting debut at the Royal Opera House, Covent Garden in 1897, and appeared with some regularity as a guest conductor at that opera house through 1912. In 1902 he conducted the world premiere of Francesco Cilea's Adriana Lecouvreur at the Teatro Lirico in Milan. From 1903-1905 he worked on the conducting staff of La Scala, where he conducted the premieres of Umberto Giordano's Siberia in 1903 and Puccini's Madama Butterfly in 1904.

== Later career in the United States ==
Campanini spent the last thirteen years of his life as the artistic director of opera companies the United States where he became associated with both French opera and Italian opera. He introduced numerous works in these languages to the United States, including Hérodiade, Le jongleur de Notre-Dame, Grisélidis, Cendrillon, Cléopâtre, I gioielli della Madonna, Monna Vanna, Jules Massenet's Sapho, Isabeau, Conchita, Cristoforo Colombo, Déjanire, Sylvio Lazzari's Le Sauteriot, Vittorio Gnecchi's Cassandra, Jean Nouguès's Quo Vadis, Jan Blockx's Princesse d'Auberge, Frédéric Alfred d'Erlanger's Noël, Raoul Gunsbourg's Le Vieil Aigle, and Attilio Parelli's I dispettosi amanti. While he did not often conduct German operas, they were not completely absent from his repertoire as a conductor. He conducted the United States premieres of Karl Goldmark's Das Heimchem am Herd and Wilhelm Kienzl's Der Kuhreigen.

In 1906 Campanini was appointed artistic director of the newly formed Manhattan Opera Company. He stayed there for three years before resigning in March 1909 over artistic disagreements with the company's manager, Oscar Hammerstein I. During that time he conducted a total of 32 different operas from the Italian and French language repertoires. These included the United States premieres of Jules Massenet's Thaïs (1907), Charpentier’s Louise (1908), and Claude Debussy’s Pelléas et Mélisande (1908).

In November 1909 Campanini was appointed the first general music director and principal conductor of the Chicago Grand Opera Company (CGOC); a newly created opera company in residence at Chicago's Auditorium Theatre. Around the same time, tenor and arts administrator Andreas Dippel was poached from his position as general manager of the Metropolitan Opera to become the CGOC's first general manager. After a year of planning, the company gave its inaugural performance at the Auditorium Theatre on November 3, 1910 with Campanini conducting Giuseppe Verdi's Aida with Polish soprano Jeanne Korolewicz-Wayda in the title role, Amedeo Bassi as Radames, Eleonora de Cisneros as Amneris, Berardo Berardi as the King of Egypt, Mario Sammarco as Amonasro, and Nazzareno De Angelis as Ramfis.

The CGOC also performed a regular season in Philadelphia as well as in Chicago, and was sometimes billed as the Philadelphia-Chicago Grand Opera Company. Under that name, Campanini conducted the world premiere of Victor Herbert's Natoma at the Metropolitan Opera House in Philadelphia in 1911 with Mary Garden in the title part. That same year the company also appeared at the Metropolitan Opera House in New York City, presenting the United States premiere of Wolf-Ferrari's Il segreto di Susanna on March 14, 1911 with Carolina White in the title role.

In 1913 Campanini replaced Dippel as the general manager of the CGOC. When the CGOC was disbanded in 1915 and the Chicago Opera Association (COA) was founded in its place, he was appointed general manager and principal conductor of that company as well, a post he remained in until his death in 1919. He brought the company with him in 1918 to New York for a four-week season that included Amelita Galli-Curci's first appearance in the city. He was initiated as an honorary member of Phi Mu Alpha Sinfonia fraternity in 1917.

Campanini was diagnosed with atherosclerosis in 1916, and spent the summer of 1919 being treated for the disease in Switzerland and Italy. He contacted a bad cold during his travels from Europe to the United States in October 1919. The illness developed into pneumonia and he died from that disease at St. Luke's Hospital in Chicago, Illinois, on 19 December 1919.
