= Gustave Huberdeau =

French opera singer

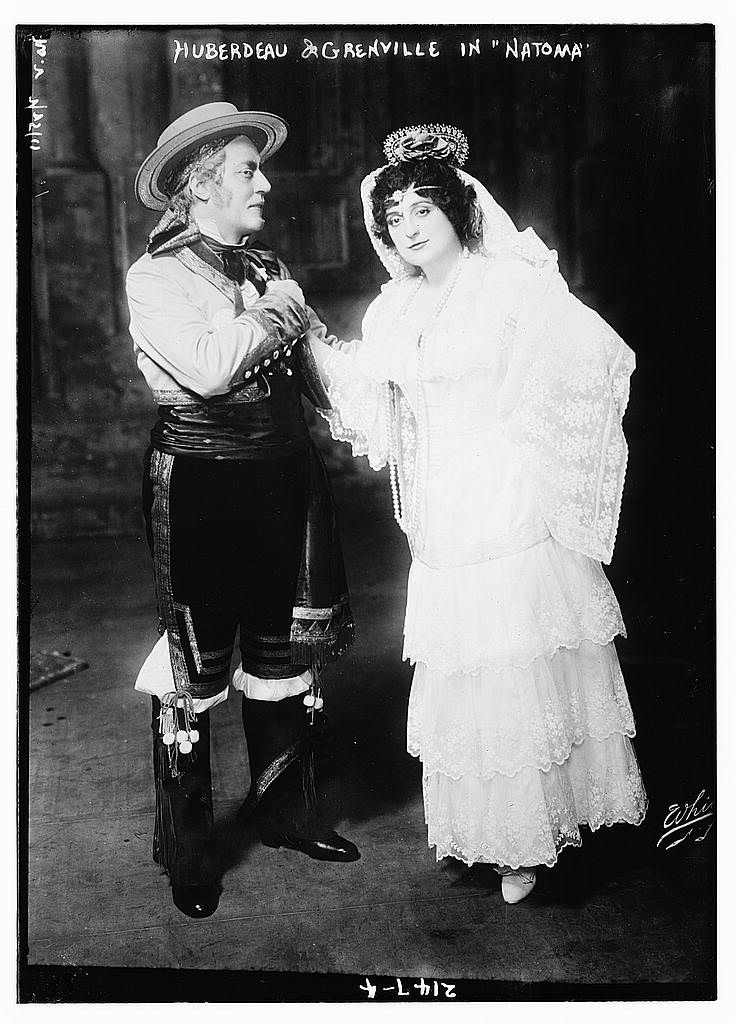
Gustave Huberdeau and Lillian Grenville in Natoma

Gustave Huberdeau (10 May 1874 – 31 May 1945) was a French operatic bass-baritone who had a prolific career in Europe and the United States during the first quarter of the twentieth century. He sang a wide repertoire encompassing material from French composers like Gounod and Massenet to the Italian grand operas of Verdi, the verismo operas of Mascagni, and the German operas of Richard Wagner and Richard Strauss. He sang in numerous premieres during his 30-year career, including the original production of Puccini's La rondine in 1917. Although possessing a rich and warm voice, Huberdeau had a talent for comedic portrayals which made him a favorite casting choice in secondary comedic roles as well as leading roles. After retiring from opera in 1927, Huberdeau remained active as a performer in stage plays and in French cinema throughout the 1930s.

== Opera career ==
Huberdeau was born in Paris, studied at the Paris Conservatoire and then made his professional opera début at the Opéra-Comique in 1898. He sang in smaller roles with that theater over the next ten years, which included a number of secondary roles in premières such as Charpentier's Louise (1900), Camille Erlanger's Le Juif polonais, Massenet's Grisélidis (1901), Reynaldo Hahn's La Carmélite (1902), Henri Rabaud's La fille de Roland (1904), and Guillaume in André Messager's Fortunio (1907). In 1908 he joined the roster of Oscar Hammerstein I's Manhattan Opera Company in New York City where he periodically sang leading roles over the next three years. He notably portrayed the Devil in the American première of Grisélidis and sang Orestes in the American première of Elektra (1910). However, Hammerstein employed Huberdeau more frequently in productions with the Philadelphia Opera Company with which he was highly active between 1909 and 1910.

In 1911 Huberdeau became a member of the Chicago Grand Opera Company, remaining with that company until it closed in 1914. He appeared in several notable productions with the company including the American premiere of Wilhelm Kienzl's Der Kuhreigen and the world premiere of Victor Herbert's Natoma. In 1914 he debuted at England's Royal Opera as a visiting artist, where he sang Méphistophélès from Gounod's Faust. That same year he returned to France and served in the First World War in the French army.

After being honorably discharged in 1917, Huberdeau joined the Chicago Opera Association where he sang leading roles until 1920. He notably sang in the world premiere of Sylvio Lazzari's Le Sautériot (1918), the American premiere of Henry Février's Gismonda, and the world premiere of Reginald De Koven's Rip Van Winkle (1920). In 1917 Huberdeau sang the role of Rambaldo Fernandez in the original production of Puccini's La rondine with Opéra de Monte-Carlo. In 1919–1920 he sang with the Beecham Opera in London where he appeared as Méphistophélès, Le Comte des Grieux in Massenet's Manon, Ramfis in Verdi's Aida, and Colline in La Bohème. He also periodically returned to Covent Garden appearing as Arkel and the Father in the British première of Pietro Mascagni's Iris (1919) among other roles.

In 1921 Huberdeau returned to France where he continued to sing throughout the 1920s in such cities as Paris, Nice, Monte Carlo, Vichy, and Brussels. He sang a wide repertory, which included everything from lead roles to character roles to mute roles. In 1922 he sang in the world premiere of Massenet's Amadis. In 1924 he left France for one year to perform in a number of productions in Amsterdam which included Zuniga in Bizet's Carmen and Golaud in the Dutch premiere of Debussy's Pelléas et Mélisande. In 1927, Huberdeau sang his last season in Monte Carlo, which included a portrayal of Hunding in Wagner's Die Walküre.

== Film and stage career ==
After his opera career ended, Huberdeau continued to perform as an actor on the stage in spoken plays and in French films. His first film role was in the 1931 movie Ronny. His other film appearances include Boule de gomme (1931), Le Million (1931), Mistigri (1931), La Dame de chez Maxim's (1932), Prisonnier de mon coeur (1932), Georges et Georgette (1933), Les Nuits moscovites (1934), Tarass Boulba (1936), and À Venise, une nuit (1937). With the outbreak of World War II, Huberdeau's acting career ended. He died in Paris in 1945.

== Recordings ==
Huberdeau was among the first generation of musicians to be recorded. He recorded only a few arias around 1910 on Edison cylinder. His recordings show a sturdy voice that is somewhat dry in quality given the limited technology of day.

== Sources ==
- J.B. Steane: "Gustave Huberdeau", Grove Music Online ed. L. Macy (Accessed 9 November 2008), (subscription access)
- Riemens, Leo (1969). A concise biographical dictionary of singers; from the beginning of recorded sound to the present. Chilton Book Co.
- Gustave Huberdeau biography from Operissimo.com (In German)
