= Giovanni Polese =

Italian opera singer (1873–1952)

Giovanni Polese (1873 – January 1952) was an Italian operatic baritone who had an active international singing career from 1894-1928. He achieved the height of his success in the United States in the years 1908-1916 in the cities of Boston, Chicago, New York, and Philadelphia, and again from 1926-1928 in Chicago. While he sang a broad repertoire from the French, German, and Italian repertoires, he was most celebrated for his performances in the operas of Giuseppe Verdi. His voice is preserved on more than 20 recordings made by Edison Records.

== Early life and career ==
Born in Venice, Polese studied singing in his native city and made his professional singing debut performing there in a concert in 1892. He made his opera debut in 1894 at the Teatro Unione in Viterbo as Barnaba in Amilcare Ponchielli's La Gioconda. He was also heard that year as Don Carlo in Ernani in Viterbo; as Enrico in Gaetano Donizetti's Lucia di Lammermoor and Tonio in Ruggero Leoncavallo's Pagliacci at the Teatro Andreani in Mantova; and in a small role in Alberto Franchetti's Cristoforo Colombo at the Teatro Regio in Turin. In 1895 he returned to Turin to sing Enrico to the Lucia of Regina Pinkert, and perform Lescaut in Giacomo Puccini's Manon Lescaut. He returned to Turin several more times during his career, notably creating the role of Count Narval in Arturo Buzzi Peccia's La forza d'amore in 1897.

Over the next thirteen years, Polese performed leading opera roles all over Europe. He performed in operas in Athens, Bari, Bucharest, Cadiz, Cagliari, Cremona, Florence, Forlì, Genoa, Lemberg, Lonigo, Lisbon, Macerata, Madrid, Modena, Novara, Odessa, Palermo, Parma, Reggio Emilia, Rome, Seville, Trieste, Udine, and Vienna among other cities. Outside of Europe, he made appearances in Argentina (1901), Chile (1898), Egypt (1904–1906), and Mexico (1906). Some of the roles he performed during these years were Albert in Werther, Alfio in Cavalleria rusticana, Alphonse in La favorite, Amonasro in Aida, Antonio in Linda di Chamounix, Athanaël in Thaïs, Caoudal in Sapho, Conte di Luna in Il trovatore, De Siriex in Fedora, Don Carlo in La forza del destino, Dr Malatesta in Don Pasquale, Escamillo in Carmen, Figaro in The Barber of Seville, Friedrich of Telramund in Lohengrin, Ford in Falstaff, Gerard in Andrea Chenier, Germont in La traviata, Guglielmo in Le Villi, the High Priest of Dagon in Samson and Delilah, Kurwenal in Tristan und Isolde, Kyoto in Iris, Lescaut in Jules Massenet's Manon, Marcello in La bohème, Nevers in Les Huguenots, Renato in Un ballo in maschera, Riccardo Forth in I puritani, Scarpia in Tosca, Sharpless in Madama Butterfly, Silvio in Pagliacci, Valentin in Faust, Wolfram in Tannhäuser, and the title roles in Guillaume Tell and Rigoletto.

== Singing and teaching in the United States ==
From 1908-1910, Polese was a member of Oscar Hammerstein I's Manhattan Opera Company in New York City and their sister company in Pennsylvania, the Philadelphia Opera Company. During that time he was heard at the Manhattan Opera House in New York as Alfio, Amonasro, Enrico, Figaro, Marcello, Nevers, Riccardo, Rigoletto, and Scarpia. He also performed those role at the Philadelphia Opera House, and was also heard in Philadelphia as the Count di Luna, Germont, Iago in Otello, Tonio, and Valentine.

After both of Hammerstein's opera companies dissolved in 1910, Polese joined the roster of artists at the Boston Opera Company where he remained committed through 1913. At the Boston Opera House he performed the roles of Alfio, Amonasro, Count di Luna, Enrico, Figaro, Germont, Jack Rance in La Fanciulla del West, Marcello, Rafaele in I gioielli della Madonna, Riccardo, Scarpia, Sharpless, and Tonio. In the Fall of 1913 he left the Boston Opera to join the Chicago Grand Opera Company (CGOC) where he made his debut as Marcello. With the company he notably performed the role of Don Fulgenzio in the world premiere of Attilio Parelli's I dispettosi amanti (1912), and portrayed Egisto in the United States premiere of Vittorio Gnecchi's Cassandra (1914). He also performed the roles of Amonasro, Count di Luna, Enrico, Germont, and Rafaele for the company. He also made guest appearances with the Baltimore Opera Company (1912, 1914), and appeared in operas in Springfield (1911), Portland (1911), New Haven (1912) and Minneapolis (1914).

After the CGOC went bankrupt in 1915, Polese returned briefly to Europe to perform in operas in Carrara, Verona, and at the Teatro Carlo Felice in Genoa. He returned to Chicago in 1916 to join the newly formed Chicago Opera Association. He performed one season with company, portraying the roles of Alfio, Enrico, Ford, Germont, and Sharpless. With the outbreak of World War I he returned to Italy, and was not seen again on the stage until 1918 when he appeared in operas in Como, Ferrara, and New York. He then retired from the stage and began teaching singing in New York City and later in Boston. He came out of retirement in 1926 to join the roster of artists at the Chicago Civic Opera. He sang three seasons with that company, performing the roles of Abimélech and the High Priest of Dagon in Samson and Delilah, Count di Luna, Ford, and Herr von Faninal in Der Rosenkavalier. His final opera performance was as the High Priest in Chicago in January 1928. He thereafter taught singing in Boston up into the last year of his life. He died in 1952 in Induno Olona, Italy.
