= Loomis Hammond Taylor =

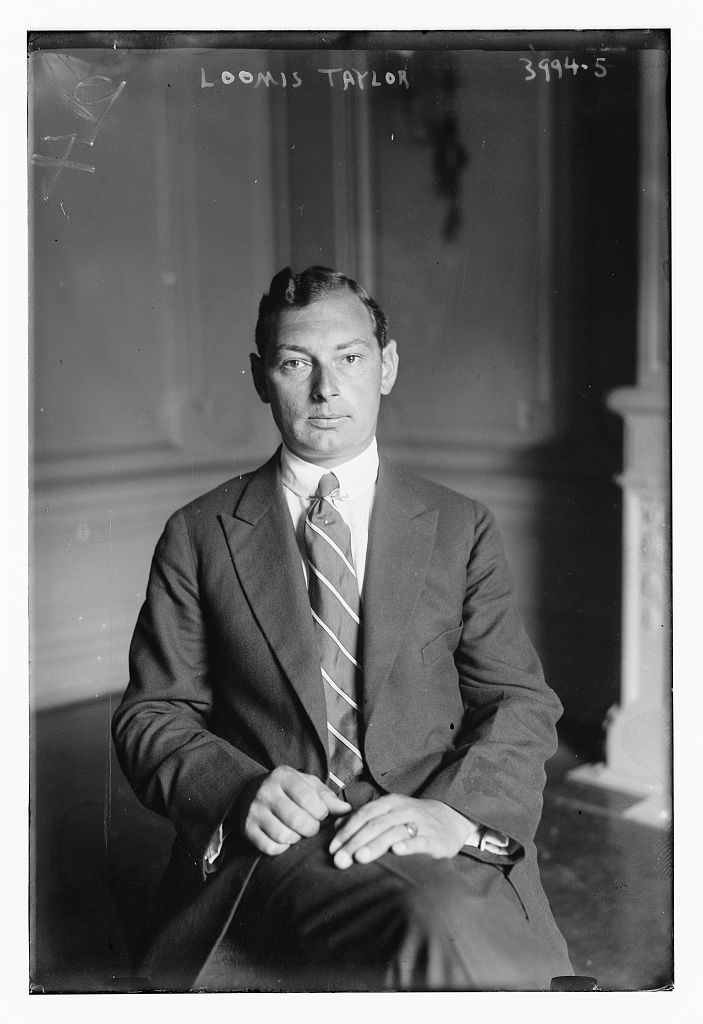
Taylor circa 1915

Loomis Hammond Taylor (July 30, 1889 – January 1, 1963) was an opera director of the Metropolitan Opera from 1912 to 1915. In 1916 he moved to the Chicago Grand Opera Company for a staging of a Wagner opera. He was then appointed as director of the Cleveland Grand Opera Company.

== Biography ==
He was born on July 30, 1889, in Skaneateles, New York, to George Loomis Taylor and Elizabeth Percy Hammond. He moved to Manhattan and was the stage manager of the Metropolitan Opera starting in 1912. He married Henrietta Cowenhoven Brown on April 19, 1913, at St. Mark's Church in-the-Bowery in Manhattan.

In 1916 he moved to the Chicago Grand Opera Company for a staging of Richard Wagner operas. He was then appointed as director of the Cleveland Grand Opera Company.

In 1922 he became a correspondent for the Musical Courier.

Taylor died in Munich, Germany, on 1 January 1963.
