= Vanni Marcoux =

French opera singer (1877–1962)

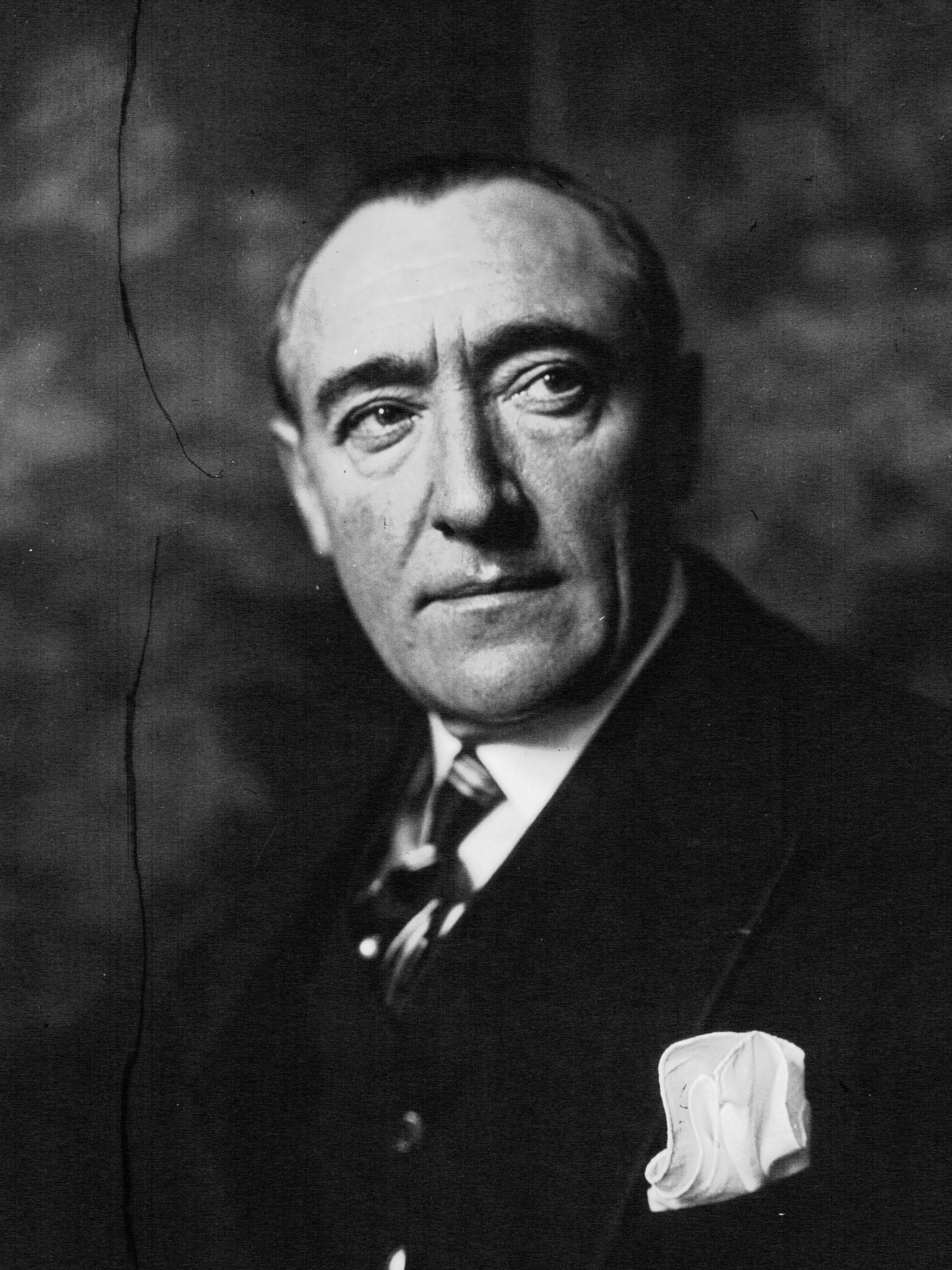
Vanni Marcoux in 1932

Jean-Émile Diogène Marcoux (12 June 1877 – 22 October 1962) was a French operatic bass-baritone, known professionally as Vanni Marcoux (sometimes hyphenated as Vanni-Marcoux). He was particularly associated with the French and Italian repertories. His huge repertoire included an estimated 240 roles and he won renown as one of the most memorable singing-actors of the 20th century.

== Life and career ==
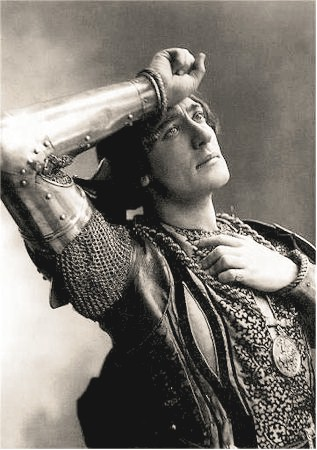
Vanni Marcoux as Guido Colonna in Henry Février’s Monna Vanna

Jean-Émile Diogène Marcoux was born to a French father and an Italian mother in Turin, Italy. His mother gave him the nickname "Vanni", short for Giovanni, the Italian equivalent of Jean. After completing law studies, he decided to devote himself to music. He studied with Collini at the music conservatory in his hometown.

He made his operatic debut in 1894, at the age of 17, as Sparafucile in Verdi's Rigoletto, in Turin. After further studies in Paris with Frédéric Boyer, he made his first stage appearance in France, at Bayonne, as Frère Laurent in Gounod's Roméo et Juliette, in 1899. Thereafter he toured a number of provincial theatres, which led to his debut at the Royal Opera House in London, as Basilio in Rossini's The Barber of Seville, in 1905, and at La Monnaie in Brussels, as Bertram in Meyerbeer's Robert le diable, in 1906.

Vanni Marcoux made his Paris Opéra debut in 1908 as Méphisto in Gounod's Faust, and at La Scala in 1910, as the Old Hebrew in Saint-Saëns' Samson and Delilah. The same year, 1910, he sang for the first time Massenet's Don Quichotte at the "Gaieté Lyrique"" in Paris, a part that would soon become his signature role. For nearly 40 years, Vanni Marcoux was a familiar and much admired figure in Parisian musical life, mainly at the Opéra and the Opéra-Comique, where he created a number of roles in contemporary operas such as Raoul Gunsbourg's Lysistrata, Max d'Ollone's L'Arlequin, Henry Février's Monna Vanna and La Femme nue, Massenet's Panurge, and Honegger's and Ibert's L'Aiglon.

Word of his many successes crossed the Atlantic, and he was invited to join the Boston Opera Company, where he made his debut in 1912 as Golaud in Debussy's Pelléas et Mélisande. This was followed by his debut at the Chicago Grand Opera Company in 1913, as the four villains in Offenbach's The Tales of Hoffmann, which is considered one of his greatest histrionic achievements. His success in America was partly due to the soprano Mary Garden, who had popularized French opera in Chicago, thus laying the groundwork for his visit.

In October 1914, in the early stages of World War I, it was erroneously reported in the press that he had been killed on active service as a member of the French Army.

In 1919, Vanni Marcoux appeared at the Teatro Colón in Buenos Aires, the most important opera house in South America.

Among his more notable interpretations were Philippe II in Don Carlos, Rafaele in The Jewels of the Madonna, Iago in Otello, and the title character in Gianni Schicchi.

Vanni Marcoux began teaching at the Paris Conservatory in 1938. He retired from the stage in 1948 and became director of the Grand Théâtre de Bordeaux. He held that post from 1948 to 1951. His death occurred in 1962.

Vanni Marcoux's career was impressive for its longevity and the remarkably wide variety of operatic roles which it embraced. He possessed a clear, although not especially large voice, with a characteristic vibrato and a weight and timbre of almost tenor quality (see Scott, Record of Singing 1979). His French diction was praised for its clarity, and he was also acclaimed by music critics for the quality of his musicianship and his outstanding dramatic intelligence.

== Personal life ==
He married Madeleine Morlay, an actress, in 1914. His wife was portrayed by Antonio de La Gandara and one of the two works painted is exhibited in the Beauvais Museum (France) and on display on the website dedicated to La Gandara.

== See also ==
- Le Miracle des loups (1924 film)
- L'Aiglon

== Sources ==
- D. Hamilton (ed.),The Metropolitan Opera Encyclopedia: A Complete Guide to the World of Opera (Simon and Schuster, New York 1987). ISBN 0-671-61732-X
- Roland Mancini and Jean-Jacques Rouveroux, (orig. H. Rosenthal and J. Warrack, French edition), Guide de l’opéra, Les indispensables de la musique (Fayard, 1995). ISBN 2-213-59567-4
