= Natoma (opera) =

- Opera by Victor Herbert
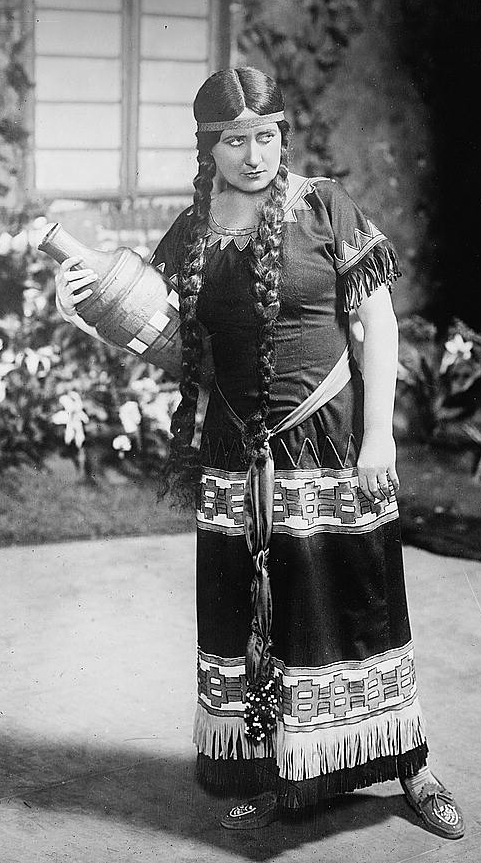
- Mary Garden as Natoma
- Librettist: Joseph D. Redding
- Language: English
- Premiere: February 25, 1911; Philadelphia, by the Chicago Opera

Natoma is a 1911 opera with music by Victor Herbert, famous for his operettas, and libretto by Joseph D. Redding. It is a serious full-scale grand opera set in Santa Barbara, California in the "Spanish days" of 1820; the story and music are colored by "Indian" (Native American) and Spanish themes. It was given its premiere performances by the Chicago Grand Opera Company, first in Philadelphia, on February 25, 1911 and in New York City at the Metropolitan Opera House on February 28, 1911.

== Composition, performance, and reception ==
Herbert stated: "I have tried to imitate Indian music. But I have used no special Indian theme. Indian themes are all very short and unharmonized. I have tried to get the effect of Indian music without using the thing itself. It is the same with some of the Spanish music which occurs in the score. There is Spanish coloring, but I have taken no special Spanish themes to start with."

Natoma was not quite the first American opera to be performed at the Metropolitan Opera—that honor belonged to The Pipe of Desire by composer Frederick Shepherd Converse and librettist George Edward Barton, which premiered March 18, 1910 —and in calling it an "American" opera, some newspapers quibbled about Herbert's Irish origin. Nevertheless, great anticipation preceded the premiere of this "American" opera with an English-language libretto, which featured first-rank stars Mary Garden and John McCormack and an unstinted production. (The production, in both Philadelphia and New York, was mounted by the Chicago Grand Opera Company, which did not present it in Chicago because the opera house there was fully booked for the season). Prior to the premiere the Times carried numerous articles, one being a full-page musical analysis quoting portions of the score in musical notation and analyzing their function within the structure of the opera.

The opera was, according to Meredith Willson, "probably the biggest flop of all time," although the Chicago production company retained it in its repertoire for three seasons. The Times reported that the audience at the Philadelphia premiere evidenced "positive excitement" after the first act, but that "After the second act, however, which is evidently intended to be the principal feature of the opera, in which the effects are piled one upon another, the audience was curiously apathetic."

In New York, the reviewer commented on "a fine production" and said "the management was very much in earnest in its production of 'Natoma,'" and that the opera "has had an enormous amount of preliminary heralding and puffery, and ... the Opera House was filled with a very large audience." Nevertheless, "at the end, the audience seemed wearied and anxious to go."

He called the libretto "amateurish," the prose "bald and conventional," and the lyrics "of the bad old operatic kind, constructed on Voltaire's theory that what is too foolish to be said is appropriate to be sung." He spends two paragraphs picking out improbabilities in the plot.

He called Herbert's music "pointedly and strongly dramatic." He questioned the value of the Indian "color," on the grounds that Indian music is not familiar to American ears,

hard and uncouth, difficult and intractable.... Only in two cases has he introduced Indian songs in their original form: in the savage "Dagger Dance" in the second act and the "Hawk Song" that Natoma sings in the third. Mr. Herbert has been ingenious in his use of the Indian elements, to make their rhythmic and melodic characteristics count for their utmost. It may be that they count for too much. There is undoubtedly a monotony in their frequent repetition.... In some of his music written in neither Indian nor Spanish idioms Mr. Herbert is less fortunate. Some of them have slipped too easily from his pen, and there is the flavor of comic opera about them.

In Meredith Willson's account—his having been born in 1902, presumably not at first hand—

Oh, the lucky, lucky few thousands who were able to beg, steal, or forge tickets to the Metropolitan on that gala night! And of course the plans for the reception after the undoubted triumph included every kind of caviar, pheasant, and dignitary under glass that could possibly be squeezed into the banquet room at the Friar's Club.... The disaster became apparent early in the first act, and by the intermission all the people who were able to attend the reception... were clutching at their bosoms in agony, knowing they couldn't possibly go to this reception and that they couldn't possibly not go....

The opera got worse clear down to the last curtain, which finally fell, like the hopes of the customers praying for a last-minute miracle.

In Willson's telling the situation was saved by Chauncey Depew, who made a speech in which he pulled out some clippings, saying it was appropriate to "read these reviews." Everyone froze in his chair as he read review after review saying things like "what happened last night was neither opera nor drama," "the performance was disgraceful and never should have been allowed," before revealing to the horrified audience that the reviews he was reading were not of Natoma, but actual reviews of the first performance of Bizet's Carmen. He saved the situation, but Willson opined that "It would have taken the great Manitou himself to have saved Natoma."

As a result of the research and processing of manuscript score and performing parts by Glen Clugston and Peter Hilliard, a first published edition of the opera is now available.

A three-day event culminating in a July 13, 2014 reading of the complete opera using the first published edition was produced under the auspices of VHRP LIVE! All parts of the event were open to the public. The reading was performed with a 58-piece orchestra, a 36-member chorus, soloists and was conducted by Gerald Steichen. This reading was favorably reviewed by national press.

== Roles ==
Role	Voice type	Premiere Cast (Conductor: Cleofonte Campanini)
Natoma	soprano	Mary Garden
Barbara de la Guerra	soprano	Lillian Grenville
Lieutenant Paul Merrill	tenor	John McCormack
Don Francisco	baritone	Gustave Huberdeau
Juan Bautista Alvarado	baritone	Mario Sammarco
Father Peralta	bass	Hector Dufranne
Pico	baritone	Armand Crabbé
Kagama	baritone	Constantin Nicolay
Josè Castro	bass	Frank Preisch
Chiquita	mezzo-soprano	
A voice	mezzo-soprano	Minnie Egener
Sergeant	tenor	Désiré Defrère
