= Dora de Phillippe =

French opera soprano (1877 – post-1931)

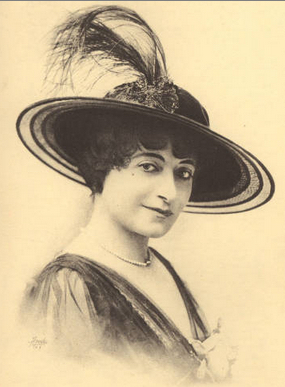
- Dora de Phillippe, from a 1916 publication
- Born: Dora Auspitz; October 16, 1887; Paris
- Died: After February 1931
- Other names: Dora de Fillippe, Dora Auspitz de Fillippe, Dora Phinney
- Occupation: singer
- Years active: 1902–1931
- Known for: Madame Butterfly

Dora de Phillippe (born October 16, 1887 – died after February 1931), born Dora Auspitz, was a French soprano opera singer, based in North America, also known for her work in war relief during World War I.

== Early life ==
Dora Auspitz was born in Paris, the daughter of Jules Auspitz and Augustine Bruckner Auspitz. She trained as a singer in Berlin and Vienna. Her publicity said she was of "French-Austrian heritage" and that her father was a banker and a writer.

== Career ==
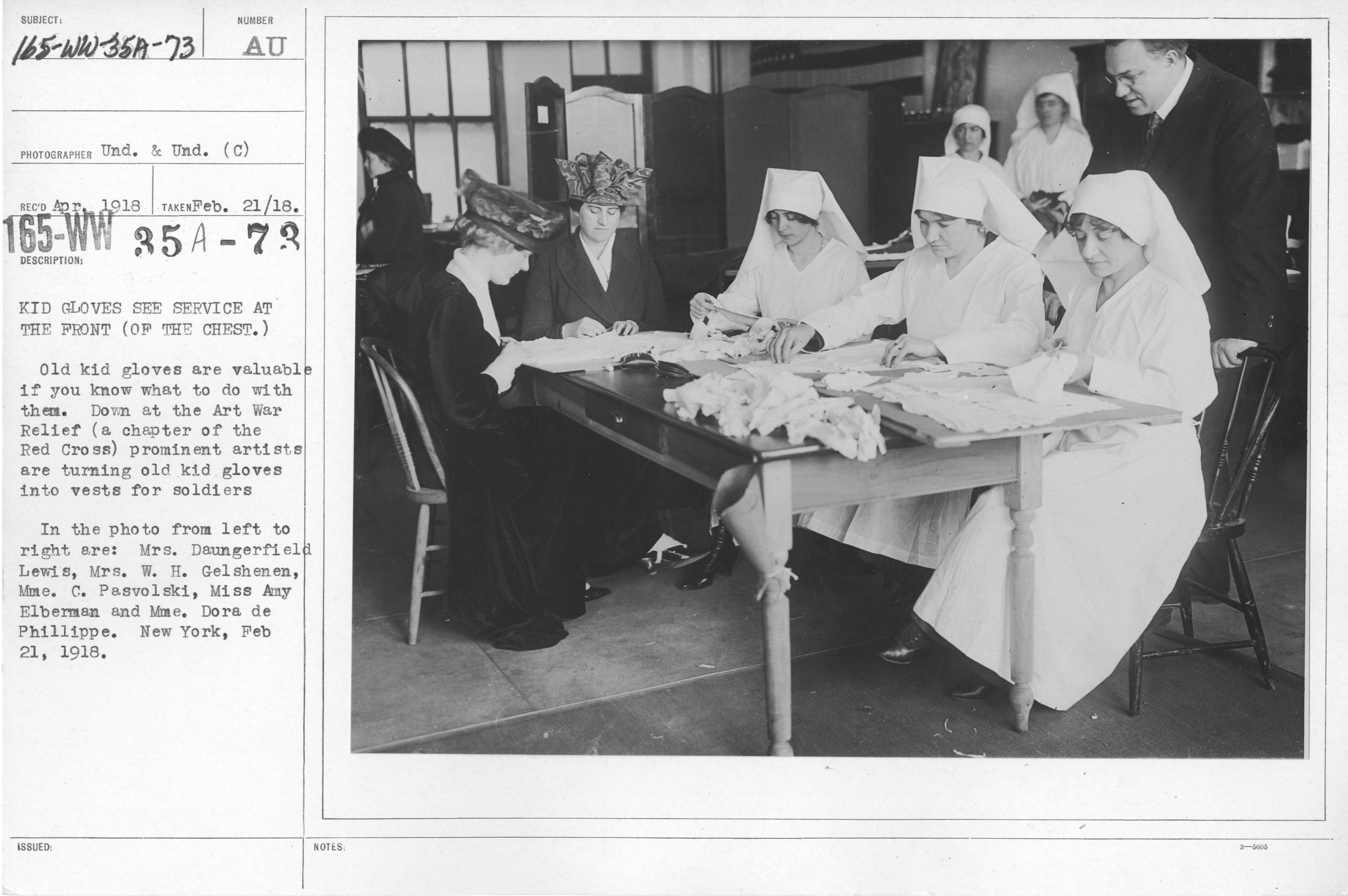
American Red Cross – Classes in Red Cross Work – Dora de Phillippe is seated at right, remaking kid gloves into vests for soldiers; NARA – 20802078

Dora de Phillippe first performed in the United States in 1902, and was already "an accomplished lieder singer", playing soubrette parts in San Francisco, by 1904. She sang with the National Opera of Canada, the Chicago Grand Opera Company, and the Aborn Opera Company, among others. She was one of the first to perform Madama Butterfly in English for American audiences, and was credited with singing the part of Cio-Cio-San more than any other singer at the time. She also sang the part in Italian.

De Phillippe's other roles included Nedda in Pagliacci and Micaela in Carmen. In 1916, she began as a Chautauqua presenter, hoping to bring opera to untraditional audiences outside major cities.

During World War I, de Phillippe was active in warwork, publicizing American Red Cross efforts to provide warm clothing for soldiers, and giving benefit concerts for the Red Cross and for Liberty Bonds. Her rendition of La Marseillaise was especially sought, because "the hymn is rarely given with greater fervor than when she sings it."

After the war and in widowhood, de Phillippe continued on stage and on the Chautauqua circuit. She headed her own touring company in 1926. She also continued giving concerts for charities, including for the Blind Relief Fund of Philadelphia in 1927. In 1931, she sang a recital in New York City.

== Personal life ==
Dora de Phillippe married American theatrical manager Arthur S. Phinney in 1909. Phinney died in 1920.
