= Chicago Grand Opera Company =

Two opera companies in Chicago, Illinois, US

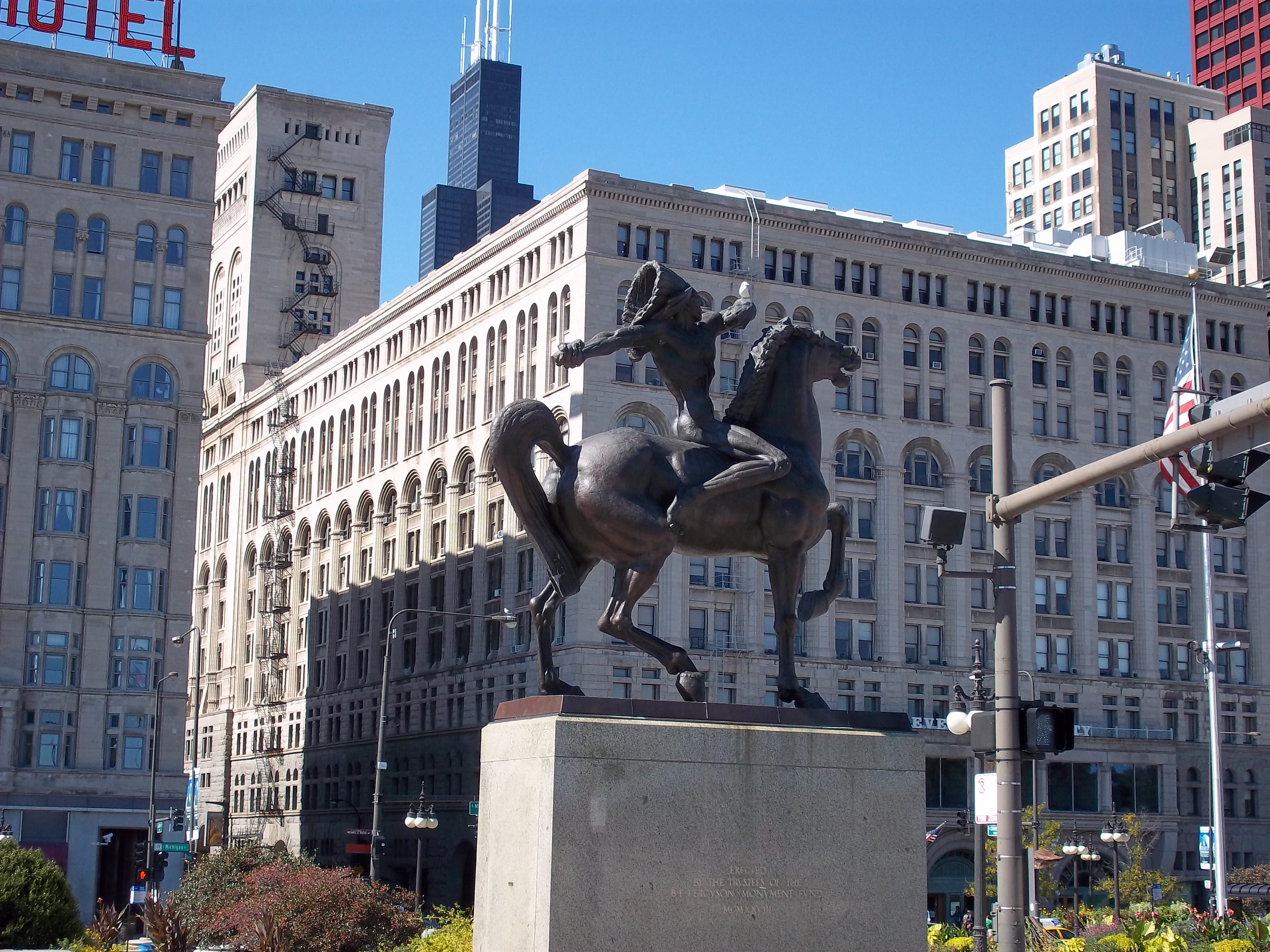
- The Auditorium Building, home of the Chicago Grand Opera Company
- Interactive map of Chicago Grand Opera Company
- Type: Opera house
- Event: Opera

Two grand opera companies in Chicago, Illinois, have gone by the name Chicago Grand Opera Company during the first half of the 20th century. Like many opera ventures in Chicago, both succumbed to financial difficulties within a few years, and it was not until 1954 that a lasting company was formed in the city.

== First company, 1910–1914 ==
The first Chicago Grand Opera Company produced four seasons of opera in Chicago's Auditorium Theater from the fall of 1910 through January 1914. It was the first resident Chicago opera company, and was formed mostly from an arrangement by the directors of the New York Metropolitan Opera Company (at "the Old Met" on 39th Street) to acquire the assets of Oscar Hammerstein's dissolved Manhattan Opera Company.

=== Background ===
Hammerstein had been producing opera in competition with the Met for a number of years. His opposition, and difficulties arising from its own management disagreements cost the Metropolitan a deficit of close to $300,000 for the 1908–9 season; whereas Hammerstein made a profit of $229,000. He had opera stars such as Luisa Tetrazzini, Mary Garden, John McCormack and Mario Sammarco at his service. However, he had considerably less success at his Philadelphia Opera House the following season, and on January 1, 1910, he confided to the press : "The operatic war is suicide." Otto Kahn and his associates at the New York Met offered to buy Hammerstein out, and on April 26, 1910, he accepted $1,200,000 for his Manhattan and Philadelphia opera houses, plus an agreement that he and his son Arthur Hammerstein would not produce any opera for ten years in New York, Philadelphia, Boston or Chicago.

=== History ===
The Chicago company was capitalized at a half million dollars subscribed by fourteen men, including: J. Ogden Armour, Martin A. Ryerson, John G. Shedd, J. C. Shaffer (in the elevator and grain business, part-controlled the Chicago Board of Trade), Samuel Insull, Charles G. Dawes, Julius Rosenwald, Charles L. Hutchinson, A. G. Becker, all of Chicago; and William K. Vanderbilt, Otto Kahn, and Clarence Mackay. The latter three, all directors of the Metropolitan Opera Company, were represented in the affairs of the Chicago group by Andreas Dippel, previously second in charge at the Met under Giulio Gatti-Casazza, and who became General Manager in at the Chicago opera with Cleofonte Campanini as musical director.

The company also spent several months each year performing in the city of Philadelphia where it performed at the renamed Philadelphia Metropolitan Opera House (previously owned by Hammerstein) under the name the Philadelphia-Chicago Grand Opera Company in order to "satisfy the civic pride" of that city.

The company notably presented the world premieres of Victor Herbert's Natoma (1911) and Attilio Parelli's I dispettosi amanti (1912). The company also mounted the United States premieres of Jean Nouguès's Quo vadis (1911), Karl Goldmark's Das Heimchen am Herd (1912), and Alberto Franchetti's Cristoforo Colombo (1913). Notable performers who sang with the company included (in alphabetical order) Paul Althouse, Marguerite Bériza, Alfredo Costa, Armand Crabbé, Charles Dalmorès, Dora de Phillippe, Enrica Clay Dillon, Jenny Dufau, Hector Dufranne, Minnie Egener, Amy Evans, Dorothy Follis, Mary Garden, Jeanne Gerville-Réache, Orville Harrold, Gustave Huberdeau, Frances Ingram, Lydia Lipkowska, Vanni Marcoux, Carmen Melis, Lucien Muratore, Giovanni Polese, Albert Reiss, Myrna Sharlow, Tarquinia Tarquini, Luisa Tetrazzini, Carolina White, Alice Zeppilli, and Nicola Zerola among others.

After a season with no performances, the company was re-formed as the Chicago Opera Association, which ran from 1915 to 1921, and was re-constituted as the Chicago Civic Opera, which ran from 1921 to 1932.

== Second company, 1933–1935 ==
The second Chicago Grand Opera Company was an attempt to keep opera going in Chicago after the collapse of the Chicago Civic Opera in 1932. It produced three seasons of opera at the Civic Opera House from 1933 to 1935 before it too succumbed to financial difficulties. It was succeeded by the Chicago City Opera Company, 1936–1939, and then the Chicago Opera Company, 1940–1946.

There was no resident opera company after that until 1954, when the Lyric Theatre of Chicago was established, and renamed Lyric Opera of Chicago two years later.
