= Lalla Miranda =

Australian opera singer (1874–1944)

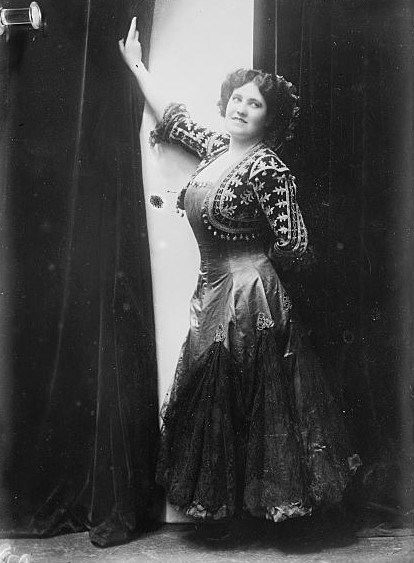
Lalla Miranda

Lalla Miranda (1874–1944) was an Australian lyric coloratura soprano who was primarily active in Belgium, France, and Great Britain. Born in Melbourne, she was the daughter of opera singers David Miranda and Annetta Hirst and the older sister of opera singer Beatrice Miranda. After studies in London and Paris, she made her professional opera debut in The Hague in 1898. She then appeared in numerous operas in Amsterdam in successive years. In 1899 she was a resident artist at La Monnaie. She made several appearances at the Palais Garnier in Paris and at theatres in the French Provences during the first two decades of the 20th century. In 1900–1901 and from 1907–1911 she was committed the Royal Opera House on London. In 1910 she was committed to both the Manhattan Opera Company and the Philadelphia Opera Company. She notably opened the 1910 season at the Manhattan Opera House in the title role of Donizetti's Lucia di Lammermoor, a role for which she was famous. In New York and Philadelphia she also sang Gilda in Rigoletto, Olympia in The Tales of Hoffmann, and the title role in Lakmé. In 1912 she was released to join the Quinlan Opera Company for its season in Melbourne and Sydney, where she was well received. She returned to Paris, where she was invested in the Legion d'Honneur. After 1918 she was intermittently active with the Carl Rosa Opera Company. She retired in the early 1920s. She made only a few recordings on the Pathé Records label.
