= Dorothy Follis =

American actress and soprano singer

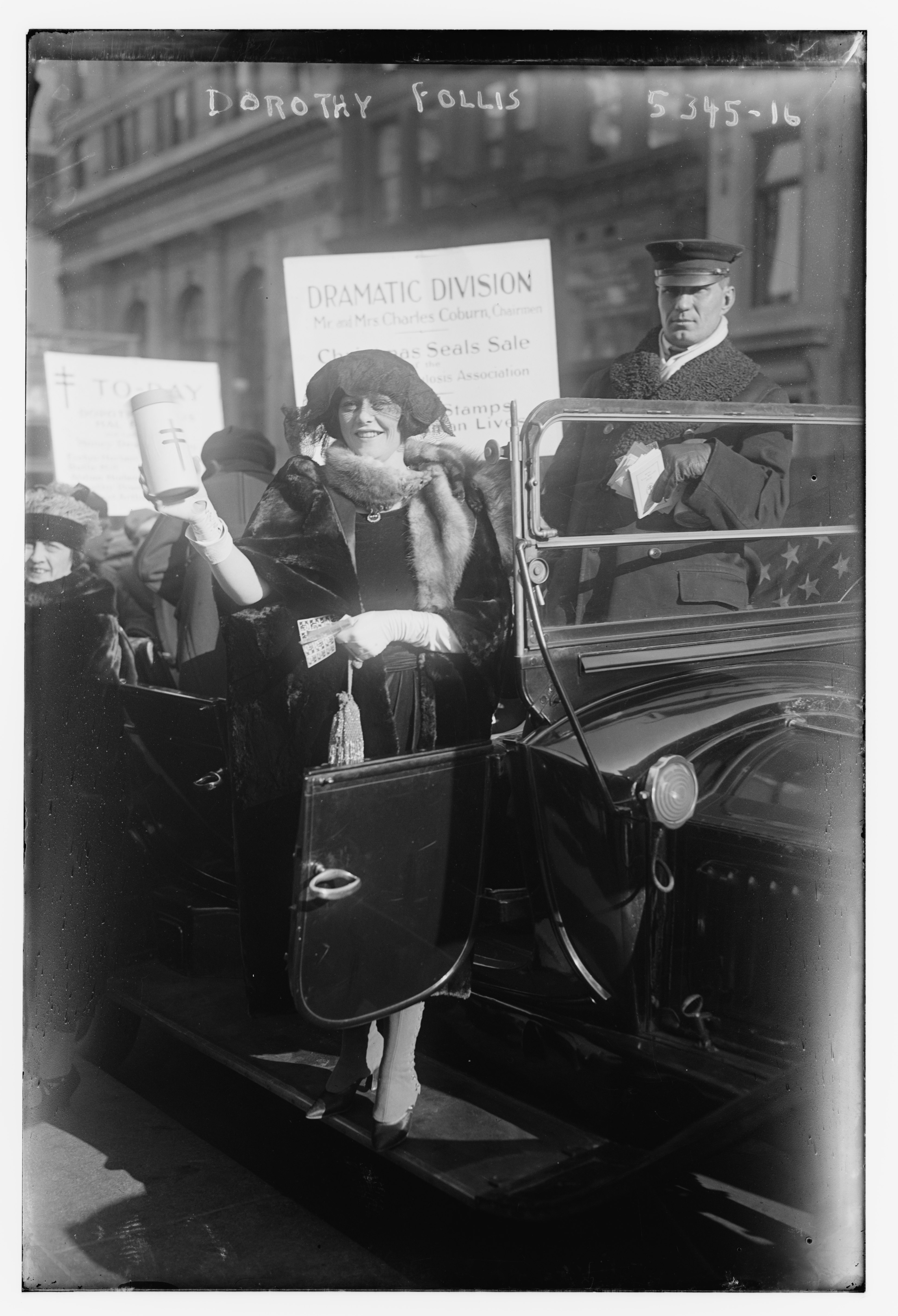
- Follis, c. 1910s
- Born: 1892; Newark, New Jersey, U.S.
- Died: August 15, 1923 (aged 30–31); New York City, U.S.
- Other name: Dorothy Follies
- Occupations: Actress, singer

Dorothy Follis (1892 – August 15, 1923) was an American actress and soprano singer.

== Early life and education ==
She was born in 1892 in Newark, New Jersey to Charles and Ruth Follis. She showed talent at an early age and was tutored by William Thorner.

== Career ==
Follis began her career in musical comedy. She had been noted for her beauty and "perfect figure" in her stage work as early as 1909. She was in the Broadway production of The Rose Maid in 1912, playing an heiress. She took the occasion to take to the press and declare that "The society women of this country are awkward!" and offered them advice.

She played the role of Lenore in the 40-week Broadway run of Honeydew. Follis was considered "the musical discovery of the season" in 1918 when she was signed to sing for the Chicago Grand Opera Company. She also sang with the Boston Opera Company as well as the Cleveland, Detroit and Cincinnati Symphonies. She later formed her own company and toured around the United States.

== Personal life ==
She married newspaperman Karl Kitchen on February 4, 1922. Follis died in New York after a short illness on August 15, 1923 and was buried in Evergreen Cemetery in Hillside, New Jersey.
