= The Splendid Sinner =

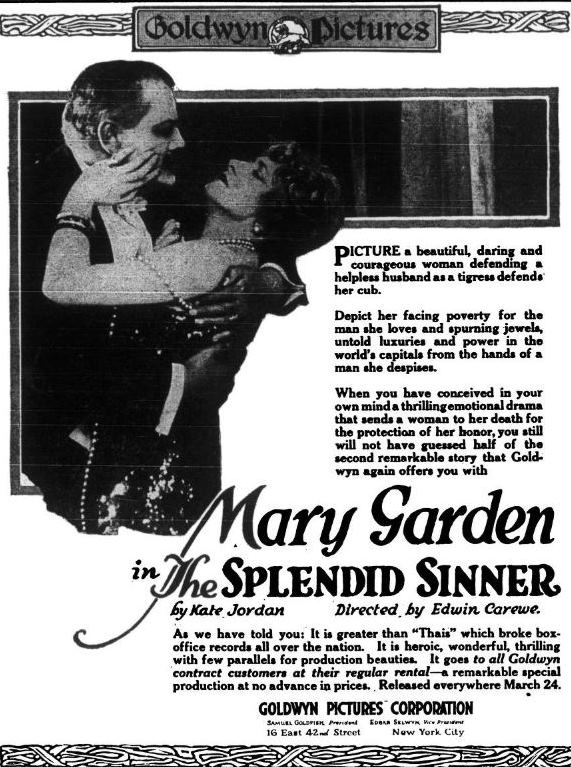
- Advertisement
- Directed by: Edwin Carewe
- Written by: Kate Jordan
- Produced by: Goldwyn Pictures Corporation
- Starring: Mary Garden; Hamilton Revelle
- Cinematography: David Abel
- Distributed by: Goldwyn Pictures
- Release date: March 31, 1918
- Running time: 60 minutes
- Country: United States
- Language: Silent (English intertitles)

The Splendid Sinner is a 1918 American silent World War I drama film directed by Edwin Carewe and starring Opera star Mary Garden. It was produced and released by Goldwyn Pictures.

== Cast ==
- Mary Garden as Dolores Farqis
- Hamilton Revelle as Dr. Hugh Maxwell
- Anders Randolf as Rudolph Von Zorn
- Hassan Mussalli as Musician
- Henry Pettibone as Detective
- Roberta Bellinger as Louise
- Greater Morgan Dancers as Dancers at Banquet

== Preservation ==
With no prints of The Splendid Sinner located in any film archives, it is considered a lost film.
