= Manhattan Opera Company =

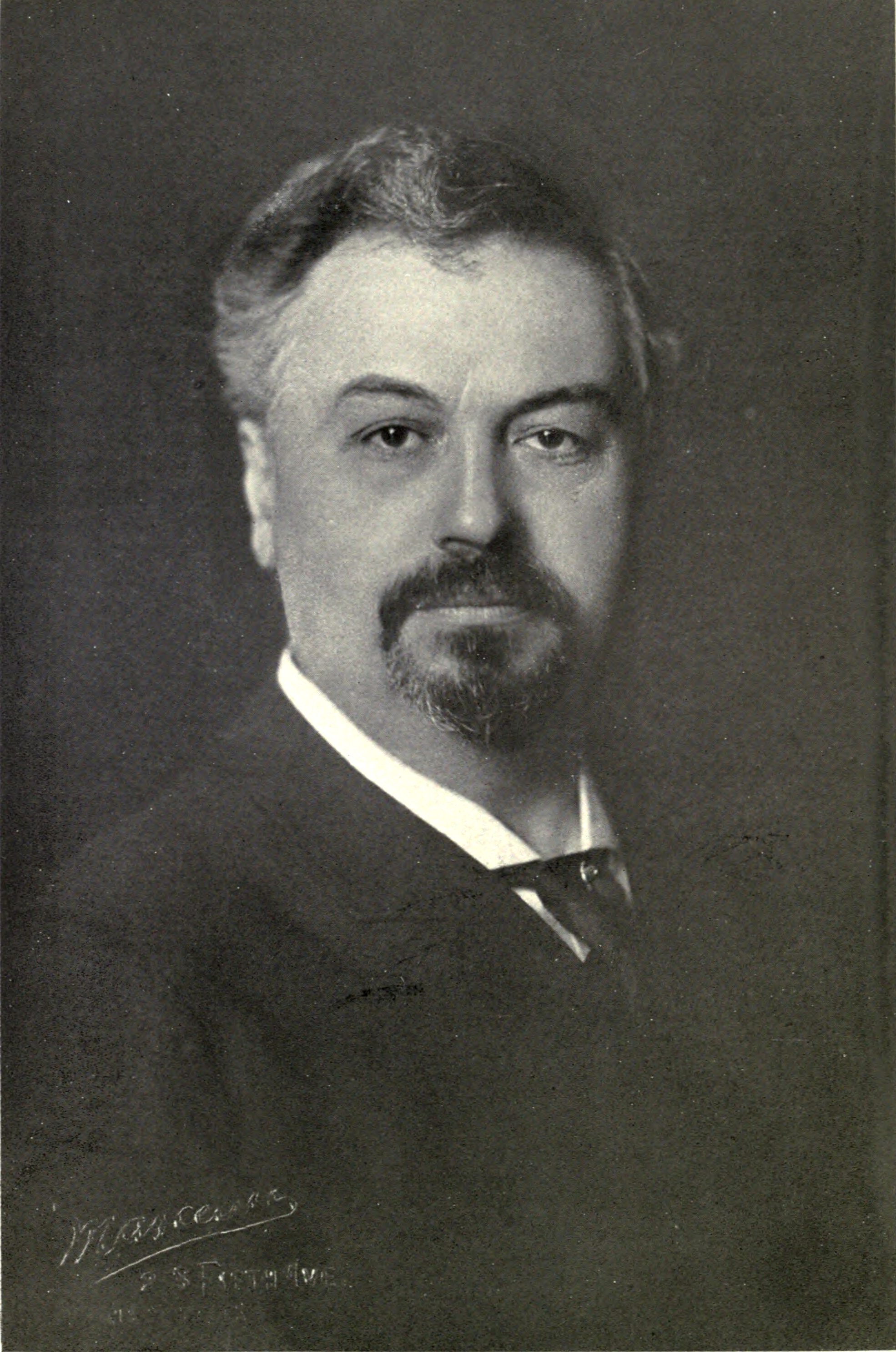
Oscar Hammerstein, circa 1906

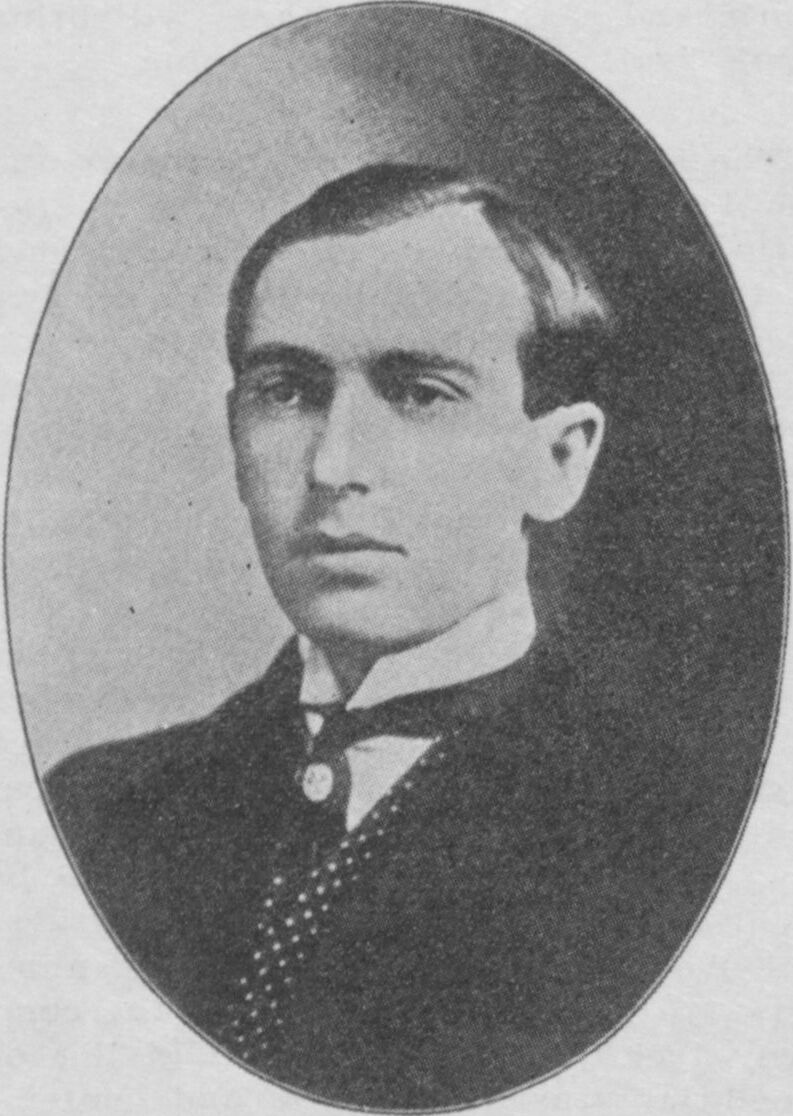
Concertmaster Leon Strashun

The Manhattan Opera Company was an opera company based in New York City. Active from 1906 until 1910, it was founded by Oscar Hammerstein I.

== History ==
The company began operations in 1906 at the Manhattan Opera House on 34th Street in New York City. Hammerstein built the house with the initial intent of making it a home for performances solely of opera in English; before construction was completed, however, he chose to shift the company's focus, deciding instead to present great operas in their original languages. The casts were to be drawn from the ranks of the greatest singers of the era. William Guard was hired to be the company's press representative, remaining in that capacity until the organization folded.

The Manhattan Opera Company opened its first season on December 3, 1906, with a performance of Vincenzo Bellini's Norma; Cleofonte Campanini served as the artistic director. Many of the greatest opera stars of the era appeared with the company during its four-year history; among the most notable were Nellie Melba, Lillian Nordica, Luisa Tetrazzini, Ernestine Schumann-Heink, Giovanni Zenatello, Lina Cavalieri, Mary Garden, John McCormack, Lalla Miranda, Alessandro Bonci, Charles Dalmorès, Giovanni Polese, Maurice Renard, Alice Zeppilli, and Nicola Zerola. Many of them made their American debuts for Hammerstein. The repertory tended to French opera, then being neglected by the competing Metropolitan Opera, and to novelties. Among the latter were Pelléas et Mélisande featuring Garden, Elektra, and Louise.

Hammerstein's company was a huge success, and provided damaging competition to the Metropolitan Opera; eventually this led to the resignation of Heinrich Conried as the latter company's general director, after which it was greatly reorganized. Nevertheless, after giving 463 performances of 49 different operas during its existence, the Manhattan Opera Company suddenly folded in 1910. For years the reason remained a mystery; more recently it has been discovered that Hammerstein and the directors of the Metropolitan, led by Otto Kahn, entered into a contractual agreement which led to the dissolution. Under the terms of the contract, negotiated by his son Arthur, Hammerstein was paid a flat sum of $1.2 million, in exchange for which he promised to stage no opera in the United States for the following ten years. It is widely believed that Hammerstein took the deal because the mounting costs of running the company were taking their toll on his finances, and he was going bankrupt.
