= Attilio Parelli =

Italian composer

- Parelli c.1900
- Born: Attilio Enrico Paparella; 31 May 1874; Monteleone d'Orvieto, Italy
- Died: 26 December 1944 (aged 70); Monteleone d'Orvieto, Italy
- Occupations: composer; conductor

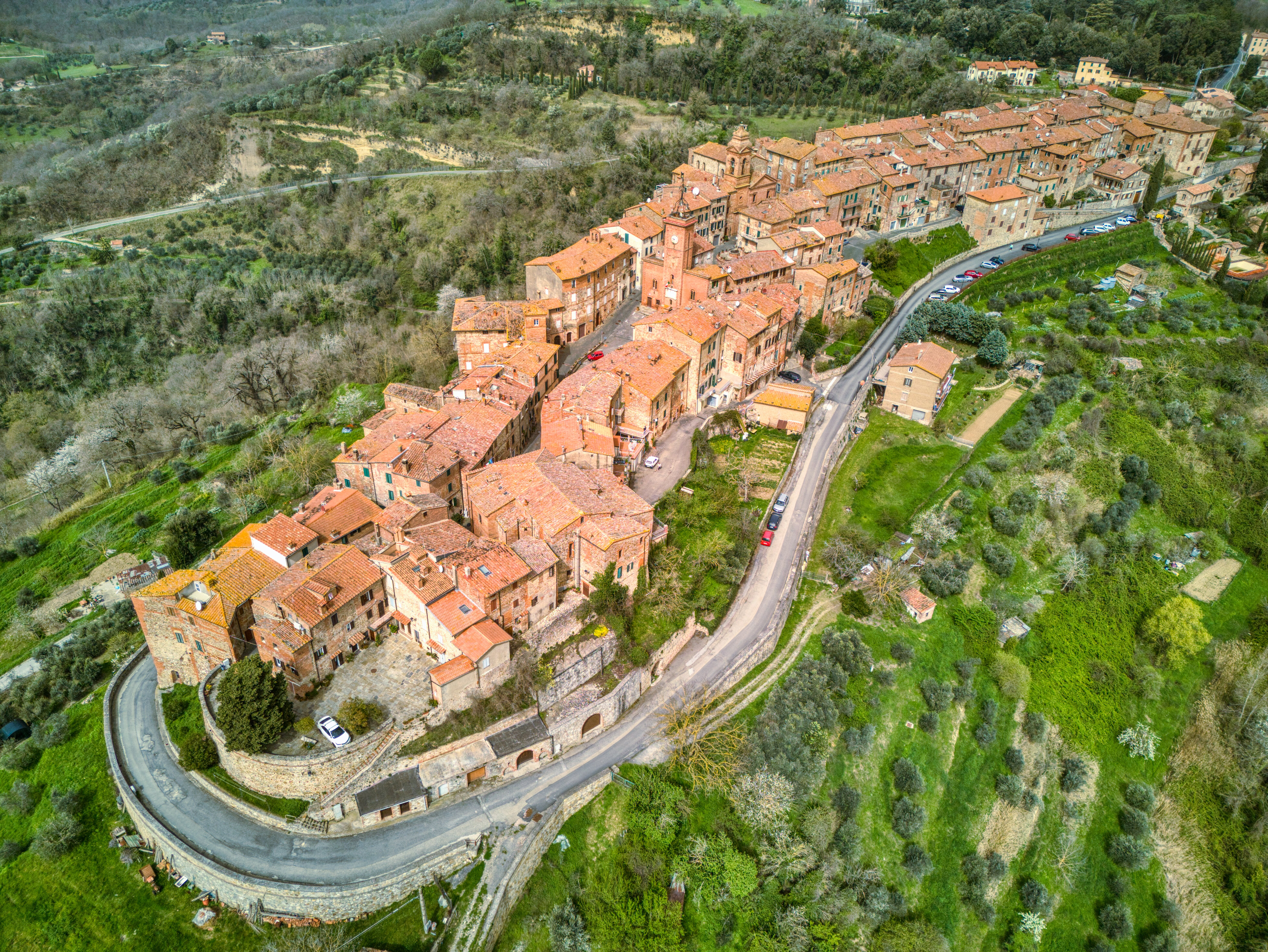
Monteleone d'Orvieto, the birthplace of Parelli

Attilio Enrico Paparella, known professionally as Attilio Parelli (31 May 1874 – 26 December 1944) was an Italian conductor and composer.

Born in the village of Monteleone d'Orvieto, about 35 km southwest of Perugia, he studied with Cesare de Sanctis at the Accademia Nazionale di Santa Cecilia in Rome between 1891 and 1899. He started work as a conductor in Italy and Paris, before moving to the United States. From 1906 he collaborated with Cleofonte Campanini at the Manhattan Opera House and the Chicago Grand Opera Company.

His most important opera, I dispettosi amanti (The Lovers' Quarrel), received its premiere at the Metropolitan Opera House, Philadelphia, in March 1912. In 1925 Parelli returned to Italy and became artistic director of the newly formed Unione Radiofonica Italiana (Italian Radio Union; now RAI) in Milan. In 1926, I dispettosi amanti became the first opera to be broadcast in its entirety on Italian radio.

Parelli married his student Isolina Rapalli. They had no children. He died in Monteleone d'Orvieto on 26 December 1944 and lies buried in the cemetery of his native village.
