= Jean Nouguès =

French composer

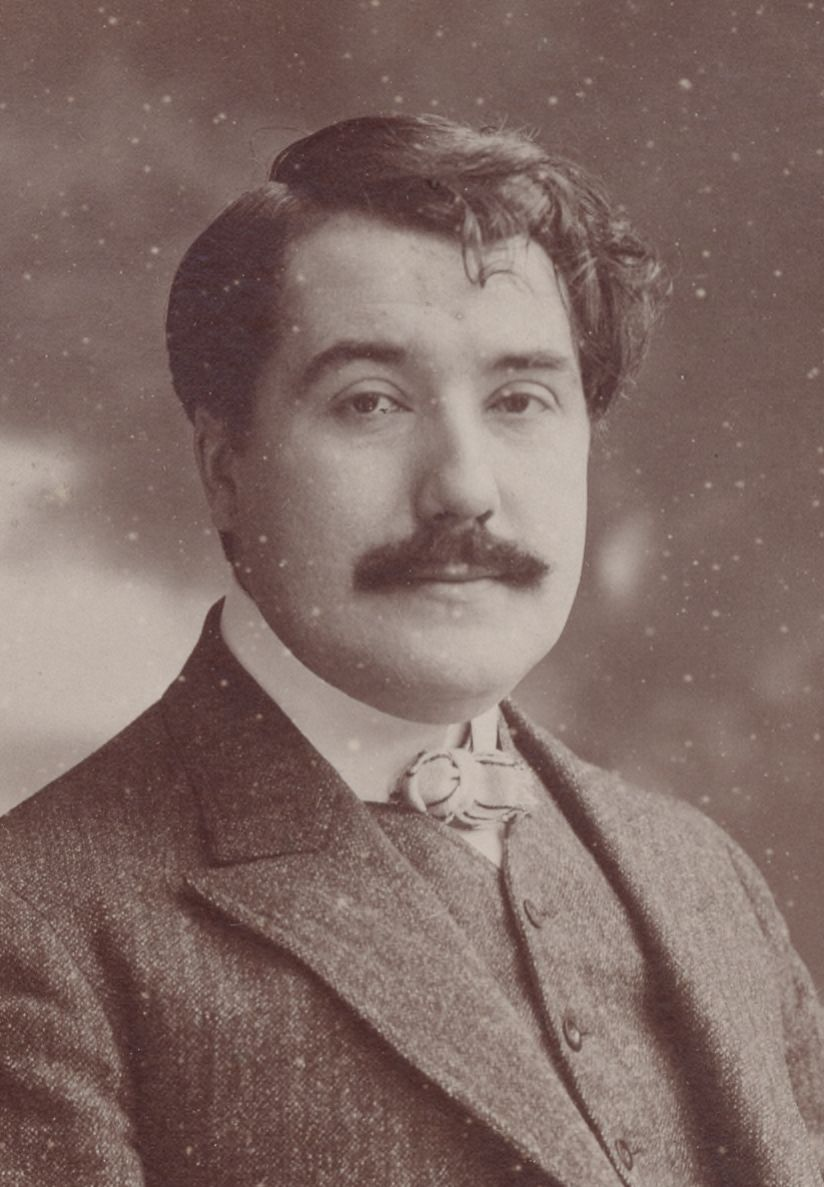
Portrait of Jean Nouguès

Jean-Charles Nouguès (25 April 1875 – 28 August 1932) was a French composer of operas.

Born in Bordeaux, Nouguès was from a wealthy family, and in his youth he received little formal musical training. His first opera, Le Roi de Papagey, was written when he was only sixteen; after further study in Paris, he composed a second, Yannha, which was premiered in Bordeaux in 1905. Neither this nor 1904's Thamyris had much success. In 1905, Nouguès gained some notice with his incidental music for a production of Maurice Maeterlinck's play La Mort de Tintagiles at the Théâtre des Mathurins in Paris.

1909 was the year of Nouguès' greatest success, the opera Quo Vadis, with a libretto by Henri Caïn based on the novel by Henryk Sienkiewicz. Quo Vadis premiered in Nice and was soon taken to Paris; from there it went on to London and Milan. The work was given its American premiere in 1911 at the Metropolitan Opera House in New York City, by the Philadelphia-Chicago Company under the direction of Cleofonte Campanini; Maggie Teyte sang the female lead, and the work was also seen in Chicago and Philadelphia. Quo Vadis found great favor with the critics; Reynaldo Hahn and Francis Casadesus were among those to praise the music, while others felt that much of the work's success may have been due to the strength of the cast.

In 1910 Nouguès composed L'auberge rouge and Chiquito, set in the Basque country, which was first presented at the Opéra-Comique in Paris; 1912 saw La Danseuse de Pompéï presented by the same company. L'Aigle was premiered in Rouen that same year; during World War I it is said it crossed the English Channel and was staged in Britain as The French Eagle. Also in 1912 Nouguès composed Les Frères Danilo, which appears to have been commissioned by Pathé Records as the first opera written specifically for the gramophone.

By 1914, Nouguès was beginning to fall out of favor with critics; upon the premiere of La vendetta at the Gaîté Lyrique, critic Edmond Stoullig wrote that he felt the composer would benefit from writing far less music. Nevertheless, he went on composing, writing operettas in the 1920s. These had less success than his earlier work, although he found some favor with his incidental music for Edmond Rostand's Cyrano de Bergerac, which as late as 1938 was used for a television presentation of the play.

Nouguès died in Paris in 1932. Little of his music has been committed to disc; Les Frères Danilo has been rereleased by Marston Records, but otherwise all that is known is a handful of excerpts from Quo Vadis recorded by Armand Crabbé and Mattia Battistini. David Mason Greene also indicates that some selections from L'Aigle were recorded in the early days of recorded sound.
