= Monna Vanna (Février) =

1909 opera by Henry Février

- Opera by Henry Février
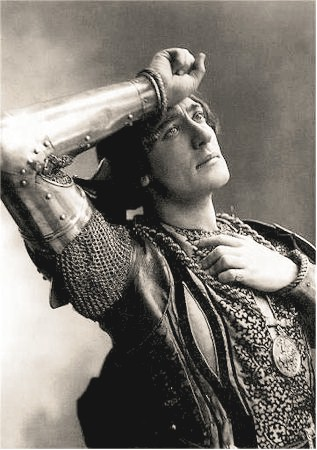
- Vanni Marcoux as Guido Colonna
- Librettist: Maurice Maeterlinck
- Language: French
- Premiere: 13 January 1909; Académie Nationale de Musique, Paris

Monna Vanna is a drame lyrique or opera in four acts by composer Henry Février. The opera's French libretto is by playwright Maurice Maeterlinck and is based on his play of the same name. The opera premiered on 13 January 1909 at the Académie Nationale de Musique in Paris.

== Roles ==
Role	Voice type	Premiere Cast, 13 January 1909 (Conductor:)
Giovanna (Monna Vanna), Guido's wife	soprano	Lucienne Bréval
Guido Colonna, commander of the Pisan Garrison	bass	Vanni Marcoux
Marco Colonna, Guido's father	baritone	Jean-François Delmas
Prinzivalle, General in the pay of Florence	tenor	Lucien Muratore
Trivulzio, Commissioner of the Florentine Republic	bass	Joachim Cerdan
Borso, Guido's lieutenant		Conguet
Torello, Guido's lieutenant		Triadou
Vedio, Prinzivalle's secretary	tenor	Georges Nansen
Nobles, Soldiers, Peasants, etc.	chorus	

== See also ==
- Mary Garden
