= Grisélidis =

1901 opera by Jules Massenet

- conte lyrique by Jules Massenet
- Poster by François Flameng for the premiere, depicting the Devil, Loÿs and Grisélidis
- Librettist: Armand Silvestre; Eugène Morand
- Language: French
- Based on: play after medieval tale of Griselda
- Premiere: 20 November 1901; Opéra-Comique, Paris

Grisélidis is an opera (described as a 'conte lyrique') in three acts and a prologue by Jules Massenet to a French libretto by Armand Silvestre and Eugène Morand. It is based on the play by the same authors first performed at the Comédie-Française on 15 May 1891, which is drawn from the medieval tale of 'patient Grissil'. The story is set in 14th century Provence, and concerns the shepherdess, Grisélidis, and a number of attempts by the Devil to lure her into infidelity. Grisélidis' loyalty to her husband, The Marquis, is strong, however, and the devil is vanquished.

Massenet began composition in 1894, completing it by the end of that year, but revising it in the autumn 1898 prior to discussing a potential production with Albert Carré. It was first performed at the Opéra-Comique in Paris on 20 November 1901, with Lucienne Bréval in the title role. The piece achieved 50 performances in the first six months at the Opéra-Comique, was withdrawn from the repertory in 1906, and in a half-century had been seen there 73 times.

According to Rodney Milnes, Grisélidis, on its own terms, is one of Massenet's most successful operas and does not deserve neglect: the action moves swiftly, the instrumentation is economic and delicate, and the melodies unconstrained, with a skilful mixture of comedy and sentiment, and a vocally rewarding title role.

== Performance history ==
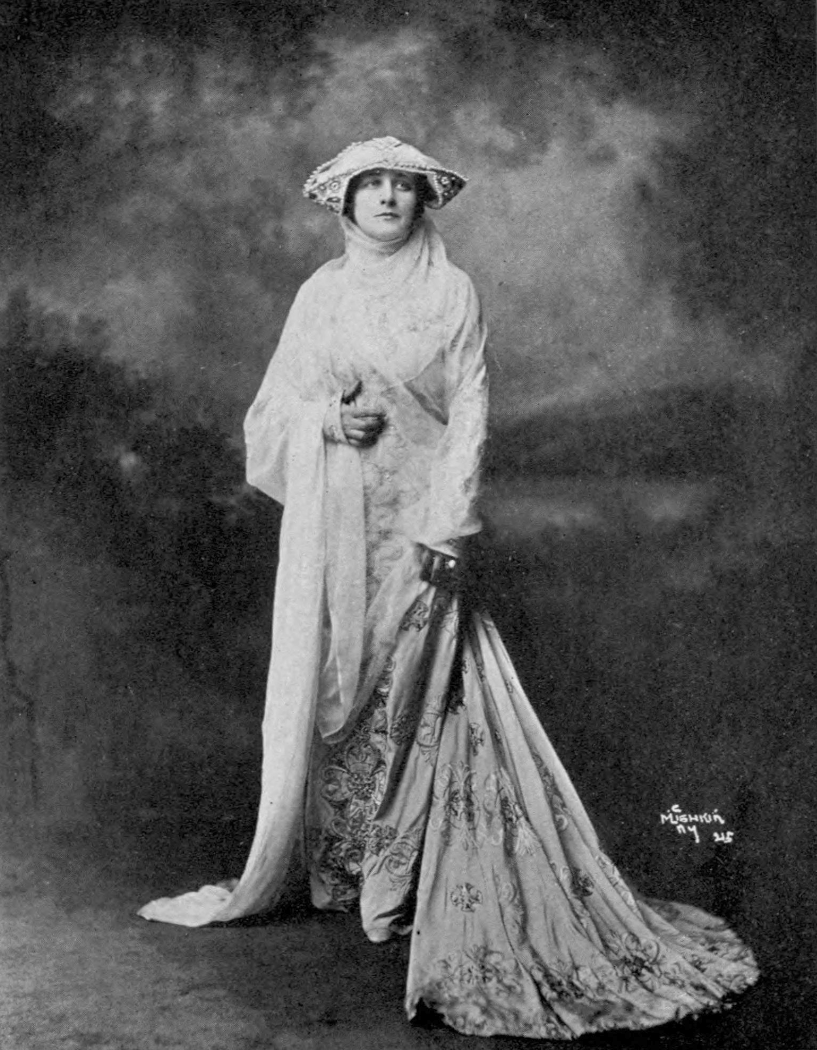
Mary Garden in the title role, c. 1919

The opera was staged in Nice, Algiers, Brussels and Milan in 1902; in Marseille in 1903 and 1950, and at the Paris Opéra in 1922. Although not part of the current operatic repertoire, more recently it has been seen in Wexford (1982), Strasbourg and Liège (1986) and Saint-Etienne (1992 in concert).

== Roles ==
Roles, voice types, premiere cast
Role	Voice type	Premiere cast, 20 November 1901 Conductor: André Messager
Grisélidis	soprano	Lucienne Bréval
Marquis de Saluces	baritone	Hector Dufranne
The Devil	bass	Lucien Fugère
Fiamina	soprano	Jeanne Tiphaine
Bertrade	soprano	Jeanne Daffetye
Loÿs	soprano	petite Suzanne
The prior	bass	Émile Jacquin
Gondebaud	baritone	Gustave Huberdeau
Alain	tenor	Adolphe Maréchal
Knights, Spirits, Voices of the night, Servants, Celestial voices

== Synopsis ==
=== Prologue ===
Evening time in the forest

The shepherd Alain sings of his love for Grisélidis. The Marquis, out hunting, sees her, is overwhelmed and proposes marriage, which she accepts, to the despair of Alain.

=== Act 1 ===
Four years later

Grisélidis has a son and, as the Marquis departs on a Crusade, his servants promise to confine his wife, which he rejects, having complete trust in her. The devil overhears all this and, as he is unhappily married, explains that he and his wife get pleasure from deceiving husbands. The Marquis accepts the challenge and gives the Devil his ring as a pledge, then taking leave of his wife and son. Bertrade tries to distract Grisélidis by telling her the story of the return of Ulysses.

=== Act 2 ===
On a castle terrace six months later, in autumn

Grisélidis dreams sadly of her absent husband, while the church bells toll. The Devil and his wife approach Grisélidis disguised as a slave-trader and a Persian houri, showing her the ring to prove that the Marquis has rejected Grisélidis. To tempt Grisélidis, the Devil conjures a magic garden and lures Alain there. The appearance of Loÿs determines Grisélidis not to return to Alain, but his disappearance distracts her, and the Devil takes the child away.

=== Act 3 ===
While the castle servants search for Loÿs, the Devil, now disguised as an obsequious old man, tells Grisélidis that a pirate is holding Loÿs, and will only release the child in exchange for a kiss from the Marquise. The Marquis, on returning, meets the old man, who points out Grisélidis running to the shore, but seeing the ring on the Devil’s finger, realizes that he is the victim of deception. The husband and wife are reunited, they pray, and Loÿs is restored to them, to the song of a heavenly chorus.

== Noted arias ==
- Act 1 – Alain: "Je suis l'oiseau"
- Act 3 – Grisélidis: "Loÿs! Loÿs!"
