= Armand Crabbé =

Belgian operatic baritone

Charles Armand Crabbé (23 April 1883, Brussels – 24 July 1947, Brussels) was a Belgian operatic baritone. He studied at the Brussels Conservatory with Désiré Demest. In 1904 he made his professional opera debut at La Monnaie as the Nightwatchman in Richard Wagner's Die Meistersinger von Nürnberg. He was a leading performer at the Royal Opera House in London from 1906 to 1914 and again in 1937. He performed with the Manhattan Opera House from 1907 to 1910 and with the Chicago Grand Opera Company from 1910 to 1914. He made several appearances with the Teatro Colón and La Scala during the 1920s. He was active at the Vlaamse Opera up until his retirement in the early 1940s. From 1910, Crabbé used the pseudonym Charles Morin when performing in small roles in London.
