= Mary Garden =

American soprano (1874–1967)

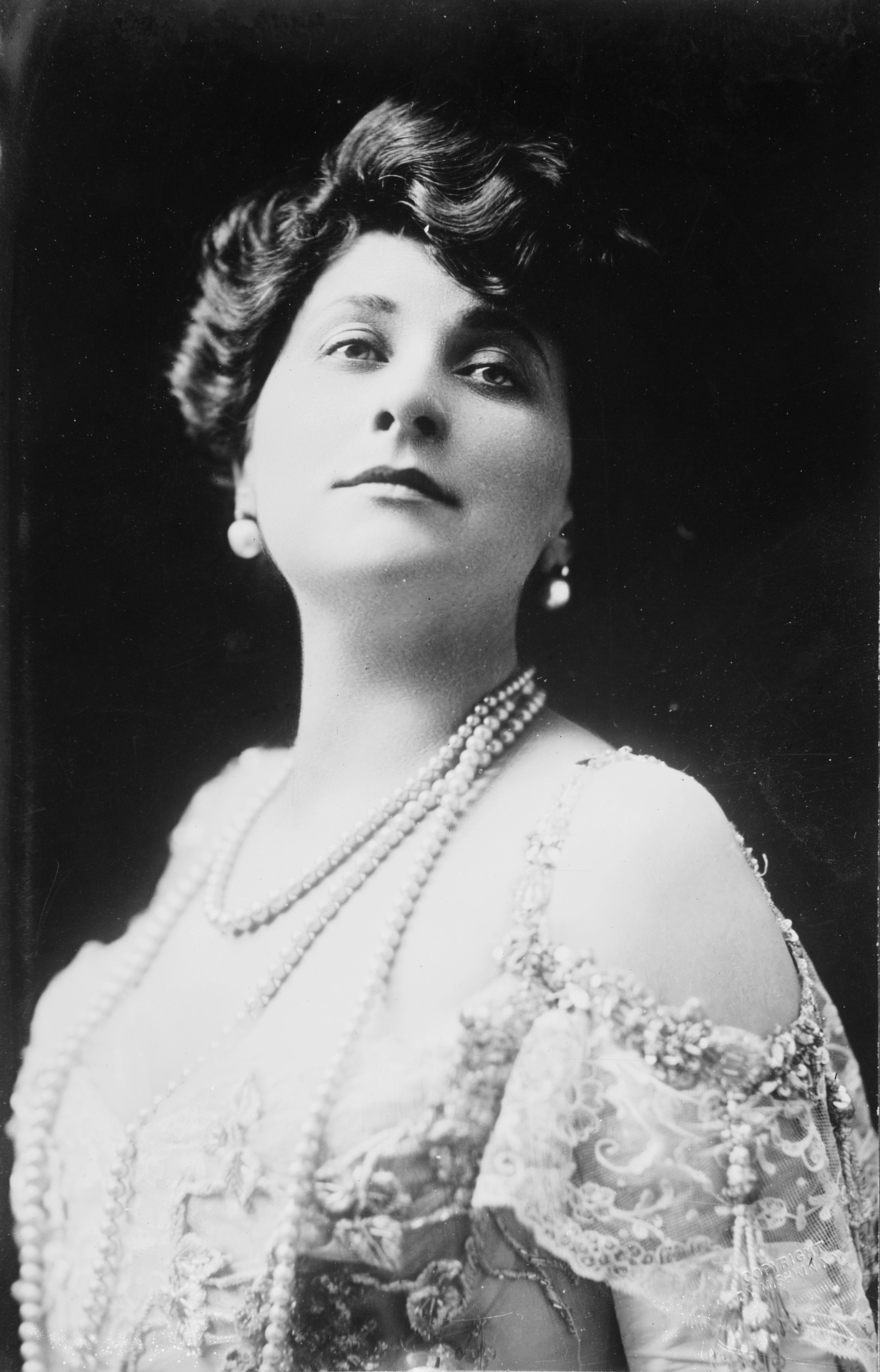
- Mary Garden
- Born: 20 February 1874; Aberdeen, Scotland
- Died: 3 January 1967 (aged 92); House of Daviot, Inverurie, Scotland
- Citizenship: British; American
- Education: St Margaret's School for Girls, Aberdeen
- Occupations: opera singer actress
- Known for: creating the leading role in Claude Debussy's Pelléas et Mélisande (1902) and for her collaboration with the composer

Mary Garden (20 February 1874 – 3 January 1967) was a Scottish-American operatic lyric soprano, then mezzo-soprano, with a substantial career in France and America in the first third of the 20th century. She spent the latter part of her childhood and youth in the United States and eventually became an American citizen, although she lived in France for many years and eventually retired to Scotland, where she spent the last 30 years of her life and died.

Described as "the Sarah Bernhardt of opera", Garden was an exceptional actress as well as a talented singer. She was particularly admired for her nuanced performances which employed interesting uses of vocal color. Possessing a beautiful lyric voice that had a wide vocal range and considerable amount of flexibility, Garden first arose to success in Paris during the first decade of the 20th century. She became the leading soprano at the Opéra-Comique; notably portraying roles in several world premieres, including Mélisande in Claude Debussy's Pelléas et Mélisande (1902). She worked closely with Jules Massenet, in whose operas she excelled. Massenet notably wrote the title role in his opera Chérubin (1905) for her.

In 1907, Oscar Hammerstein convinced Garden to join the Manhattan Opera House in New York where she became an immediate success. By 1910 she was a household name in America and Garden appeared in operas in several major American cities; including performing with the Boston Opera Company and the Philadelphia Opera Company. Between 1910 and 1932 Garden worked in several opera houses in Chicago. She first worked with the Chicago Grand Opera Company (1910–1913) and then joined the Chicago Opera Association in 1915, ultimately becoming the company's director in 1921. Although director for only one year, Garden was notably responsible for staging the world premiere of Sergei Prokofiev's The Love for Three Oranges before the company went bankrupt in 1922. Shortly thereafter she became the director of the Chicago Civic Opera where she commissioned the opera Camille by 28-year-old composer Hamilton Forrest. She sang roles at the Civic Opera until 1931, notably in several United States and world premieres.

Additionally, Garden appeared in two silent films made by Samuel Goldwyn.

After retiring from the opera stage in 1934, Garden worked as a talent scout for MGM. She also gave lectures and recitals, mostly on the life and works of Claude Debussy, until 1949. She retired to Scotland and in 1951 published a successful autobiography, Mary Garden's Story.

Her voice is preserved on a number of recordings made for the Gramophone Company (including some with Debussy at the piano), Edison Records, Pathé, Columbia Records and the Victor Talking Machine Company between 1903 and 1929.

== Biography ==
=== Early life and rise to stardom in Europe ===
==== Early years ====
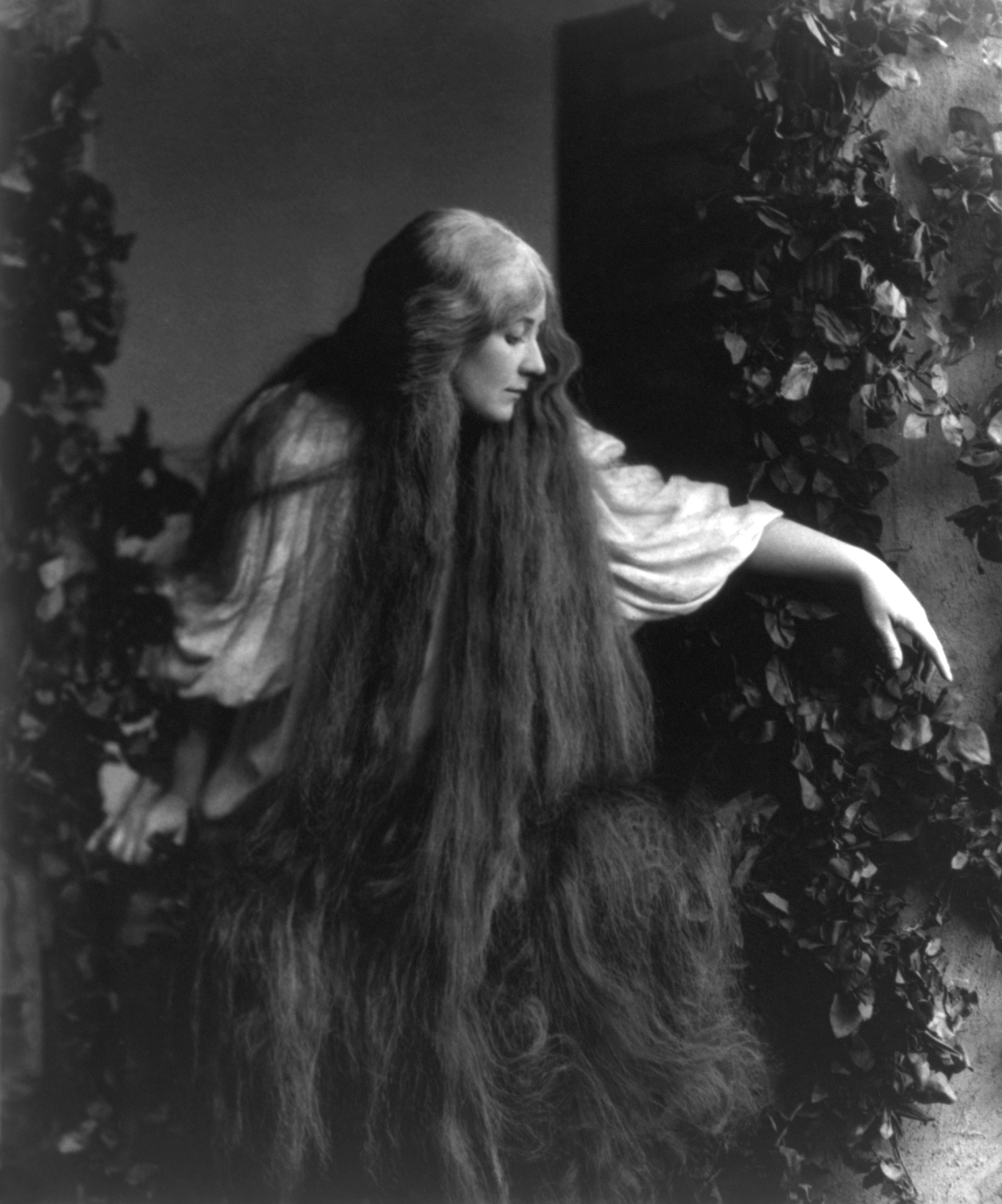
Mary Garden, 1905

Mary Garden was born on 20 February 1874 at 35 Charlotte Street, Aberdeen, Scotland, the oldest of the four daughters of Robert Davidson Garden (b. 1851), a cashier at the Blaikie ironworks, and his wife Mary (née Joss) (1852–1948). Her parents married a little over a month before her birth. Two of her sisters were born in Scotland while another was born in the United States.

The family moved to Chicopee, Massachusetts, United States when she was nine years old. They then moved to Hartford, Connecticut a few years later, and then to Chicago in 1888 when Mary was 14.

==== Voice student ====
She showed promise as a young singer, and studied with Sarah Robinson-Duff in Chicago under the financial support of wealthy patrons David and Florence Mayer. In 1896 she pursued further studies in Paris, chiefly with Ange-Pierre de Trabadelo and Lucien Fugère, still under the support of the Mayers. She also studied some under Jacques Bouhy, Jules Chevalier, and Mathilde Marchesi. In 1899 Garden lost the backing of her benefactors, and she began to study singing with the American soprano Sibyl Sanderson. Sanderson introduced her to Jules Massenet and Albert Carré, the director of the Opéra-Comique.

==== Operatic debut ====
Impressed with her voice, Carré invited her to join the roster at the Opéra-Comique in 1900. Garden made her professional opera debut with the company on 10 April 1900 in the title role of Gustave Charpentier's Louise, which had received its world premiere only two months before. Although Garden had been preparing the role, her debut, at the eighth performance of the work, was unscheduled as she was a last minute replacement for Marthe Rioton who had become ill. From 1901 for two years, she carried on an affair with André Messager, who conducted her in Louise. She claimed that when the Opéra-Comique director Albert Carré asked her to marry him, she replied that she had someone else in her life – Messager. Her description is of a tempestuous relationship, but they remained friends until his death.

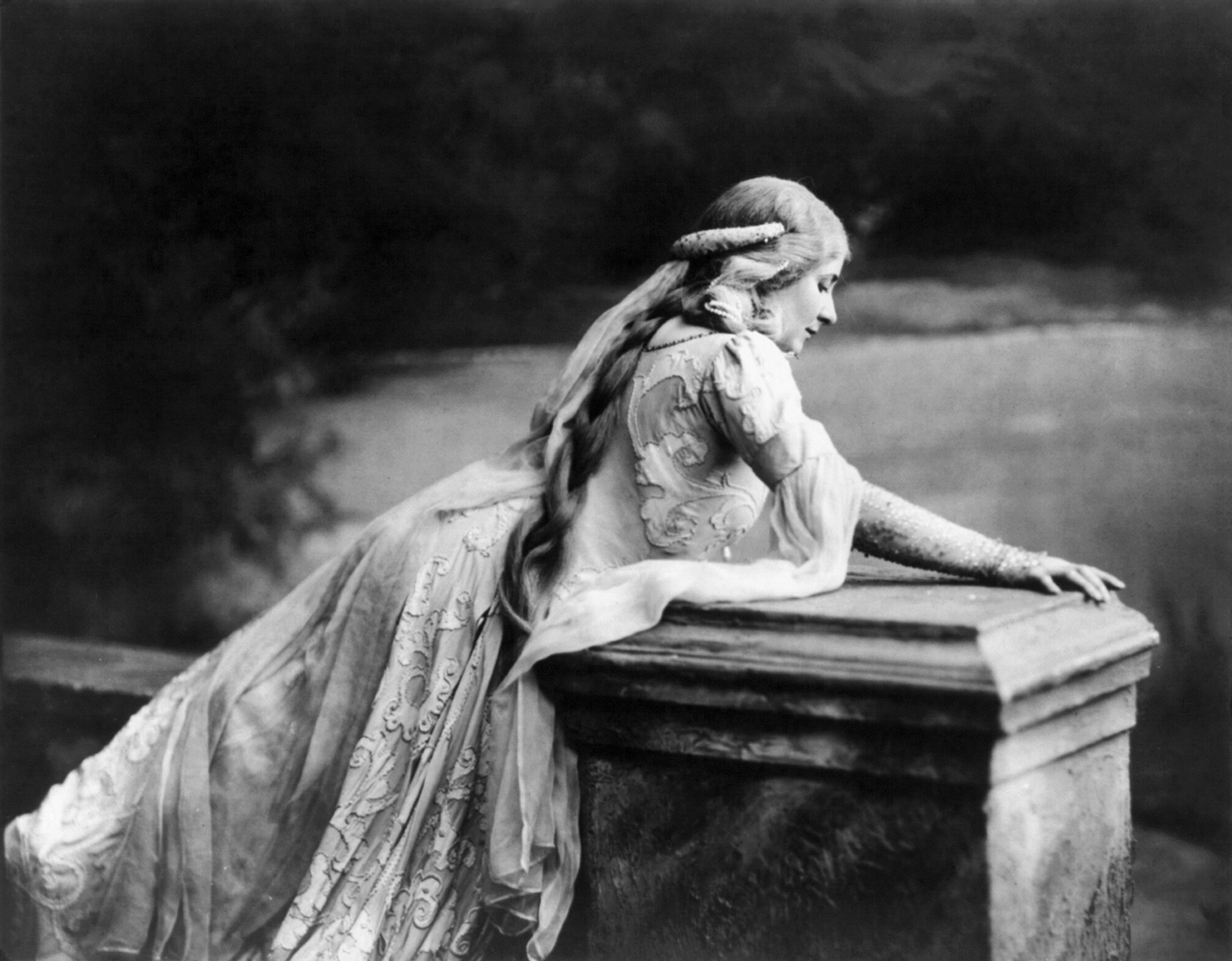
Mary Garden as Mélisande in Debussy's Pelléas et Mélisande

After her debut, Garden quickly became one of the leading sopranos at the Opéra-Comique. In 1901 she starred in two world premieres, Marie in Lucien Lambert's La Marseillaise and Diane in Gabriel Pierné's La fille de Tabarin. That same year she sang the title role in Massenet's Thaïs at Aix-les-Bains, and sang both the title roles in Massenet's Manon and Messager's Madame Chrysanthème at the Opéra de Monte-Carlo; all under the coaching of Sanderson. In 1902, Claude Debussy selected her to play the female lead at the Opéra-Comique debut of his Pelléas et Mélisande. Garden's performances met with considerable critical acclaim. She also created a sensation as Salomé in the French version of Richard Strauss's opera of that name.

Following the success of Pelléas et Mélisande, Garden periodically went to London to sing at the Royal Opera House, Covent Garden while still appearing in performances in Paris. At Covent Garden she sang Manon, Juliette in Charles Gounod's Roméo et Juliette, and Marguerite in Gounod's Faust during the 1902 and 1903 seasons. Garden, however, did not care for London and decided to not take any more engagements in that city. Her performances at the Opéra-Comique during this time included the title role in Massenet's Grisélidis (1902), Violetta in Giuseppe Verdi's La traviata (1903), the title role in the world premiere of Xavier Leroux's La reine Fiammette (1903), and the title role in Saint-Saëns's Hélène (1905). In 1905 she sang at the Opéra de Monte-Carlo in the world premiere of Massenet's Chérubin, a role which the composer wrote specifically for her. The following year she returned to the Opéra-Comique to sing Chrysis in the world premiere of Camille Erlanger's Aphrodite.

=== Departure from the Opéra-Comique and later career in the United States ===
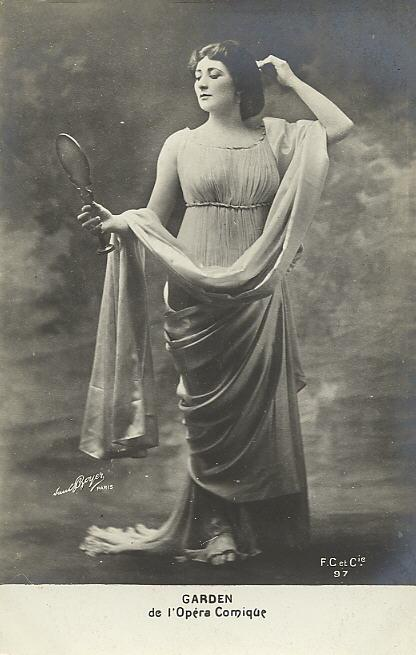
Mary Garden in the opera Thaïs

Persuaded by Oscar Hammerstein to join his competition against the Metropolitan Opera, Garden quit her frequent Opéra-Comique engagements to join the Manhattan Opera House in New York City. She made her American debut in the Manhattan Opera House on 25 November 1907 in the title role in Thaïs, a role which fitted her personality and art like a glove. She further astounded American audiences with her uncanny portrayal of a young boy in Massenet's Le jongleur de Notre-Dame (1908) and in the United States premiere of Pelléas et Mélisande.

In 1908 she returned to Paris to join the roster at the Opéra National de Paris. She sang there for one season, notably portraying Ophelia in Ambroise Thomas's Hamlet (1908) and the title part in Henry Février's Monna Vanna (1909) among other roles. She also sang the role of Marguerite in Gounod's Faust (1909) in Brussels. Afterwards, Garden returned again to New York in 1909 to perform the title role in the French version of Richard Strauss's Salome. During the performance she lasciviously kissed the severed head of John the Baptist which shocked the morals of a number of the audience members even more than her Dance of the Seven Veils (which she performed in a bodystocking).

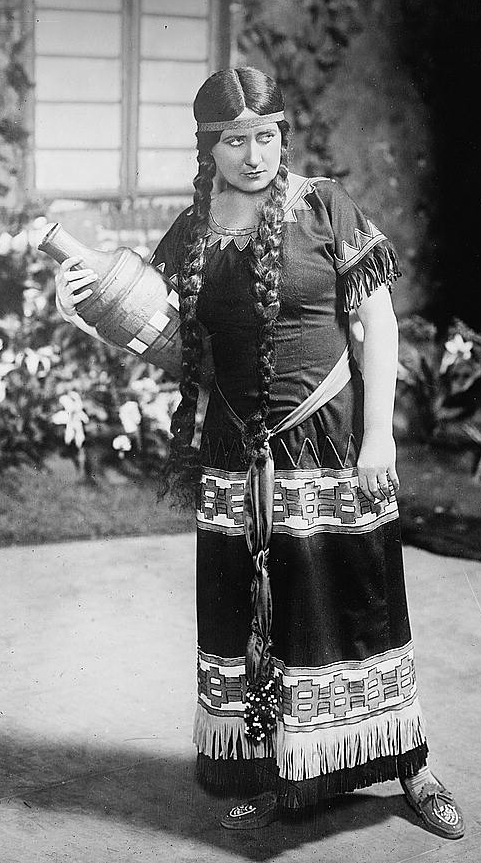
Mary Garden as Natoma

By 1910, Garden had become a household name within America. She left the Manhattan Opera House to join the Chicago Grand Opera Company where she sang from 1910 to 1913 in such roles as Mélisande, Fanny in Massenet's Sapho, Dulcinée in Massenet's Don Quichotte, the Prince in Massenet's Cendrillon, the title role in Georges Bizet's Carmen, and the title role in Giacomo Puccini's Tosca. During this time she also sang in other American cities, notably appearing in the world premiere of Victor Herbert's Natoma in Philadelphia on 25 February 1911 and in the title role Février's Monna Vanna in its United States premiere in Boston. In late April 1912 Garden along with Caruso and the Metropolitan Opera Company gave special concerts in which they raised $12,000(over quarter of a million in 2017) dollars for aid to survivors of the Titanic tragedy.

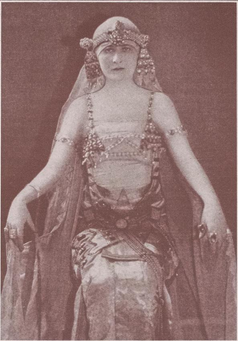
Mary Garden as Cleopatra from Massenet's Cléopâtre (1921)

Garden next sang with the Chicago Opera Association from 1915 until 1921 where she sang such roles as the title part in Massenet's Cléopâtre and the title part in the world premiere of Février's Gismonda (both 1919), and the role of Fiora in Montemezzi's L'amore dei tre re (1920) among many others. She notably became the director of the Chicago Opera Association in a notorious coup for the organization's final 1921–22 season. She was also an early proponent of radio, and entered into an agreement with Chicago radio station KYW to broadcast that season's grand opera performances, the first time this had been done.

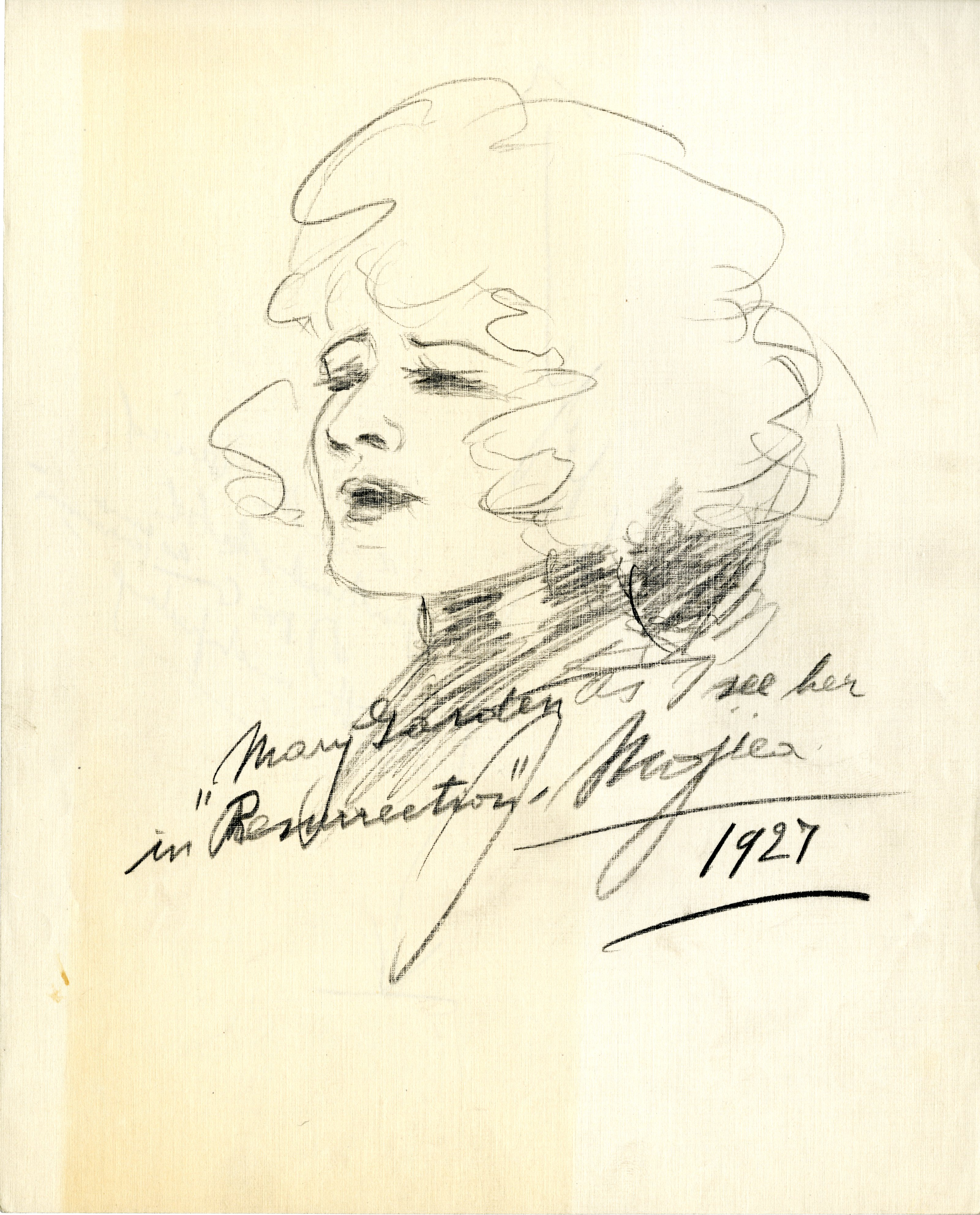
Mary Garden drawn by Jose Mojica during Cincinnati performance for Manuel Rosenberg 1927

Although serving as director for only one year, she was responsible for producing the world première of Prokofiev's The Love for Three Oranges. Also during this time she appeared in two silent films made by Samuel Goldwyn, the title role in a film version of Thais (1917) and the role of Dolores Fargis in The Splendid Sinner (1918). During World War I she was decorated by the French and Serbian governments and made a Chevalier (knight) of the Légion d'Honneur in 1921.

In 1922 Garden became the director of the newly formed Chicago Civic Opera where she also performed roles until 1931. Among the many roles she performed with the Chicago Civic Opera are Charlotte in Massenet's Werther (1924), Katyusha in Franco Alfano's Risurrezione (1925, in French) and the heroine of Arthur Honegger's Judith (1927), the last two both United States premières. In 1930 she sang in the world premiere of Hamilton Forrest's Camille, an opera based on Dumas' The Lady of the Camellias. That same year she returned to the Opéra-Comique to appear in several operas. In 1931 Garden sang her last role with the Chicago Civic Opera, Carmen, after which the company went bankrupt.

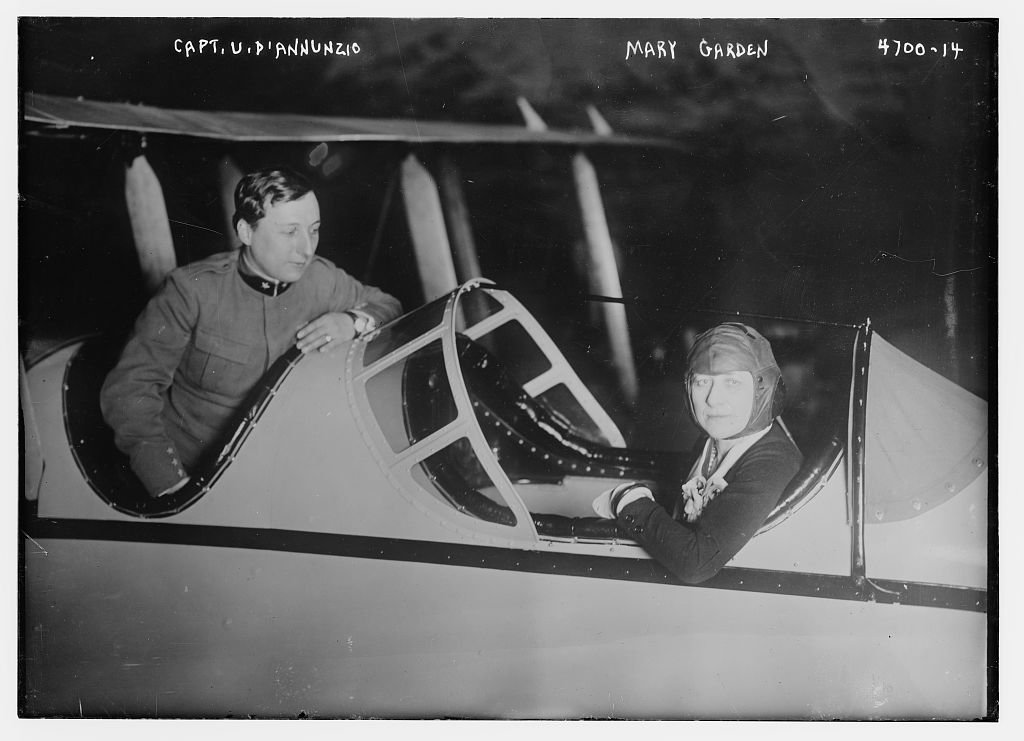
Ugo Veniero D'Annunzio (1887–1945) and Mary Garden in 1918

Garden retired from the opera stage in 1934, after making her last appearance as Katyusha in Franco Alfano's Risurrezione at the Opéra-Comique. After retiring, Garden worked as a talent scout for MGM and gave lectures and recitals, mostly on the life and works of Claude Debussy up through 1949. For much of her life she had openly encouraged young singers and even secretly paid for them to receive training. She continued to support young artists after her retirement through master classes, often allowing aspiring artists to attend for free. She also had her own voice studio in Chicago where one of her pupils was soprano and philanthropist Jean Tennyson. Tennyson later used her great wealth to provide scholarships for young singers to study the French repertoire with Garden; including soprano Beverly Sills. Garden and Tennyson remained lifelong friends, and Garden dedicated her autobiography "To Jean Tennyson in loving appreciation of our long and loyal friendship."

=== Personal life ===
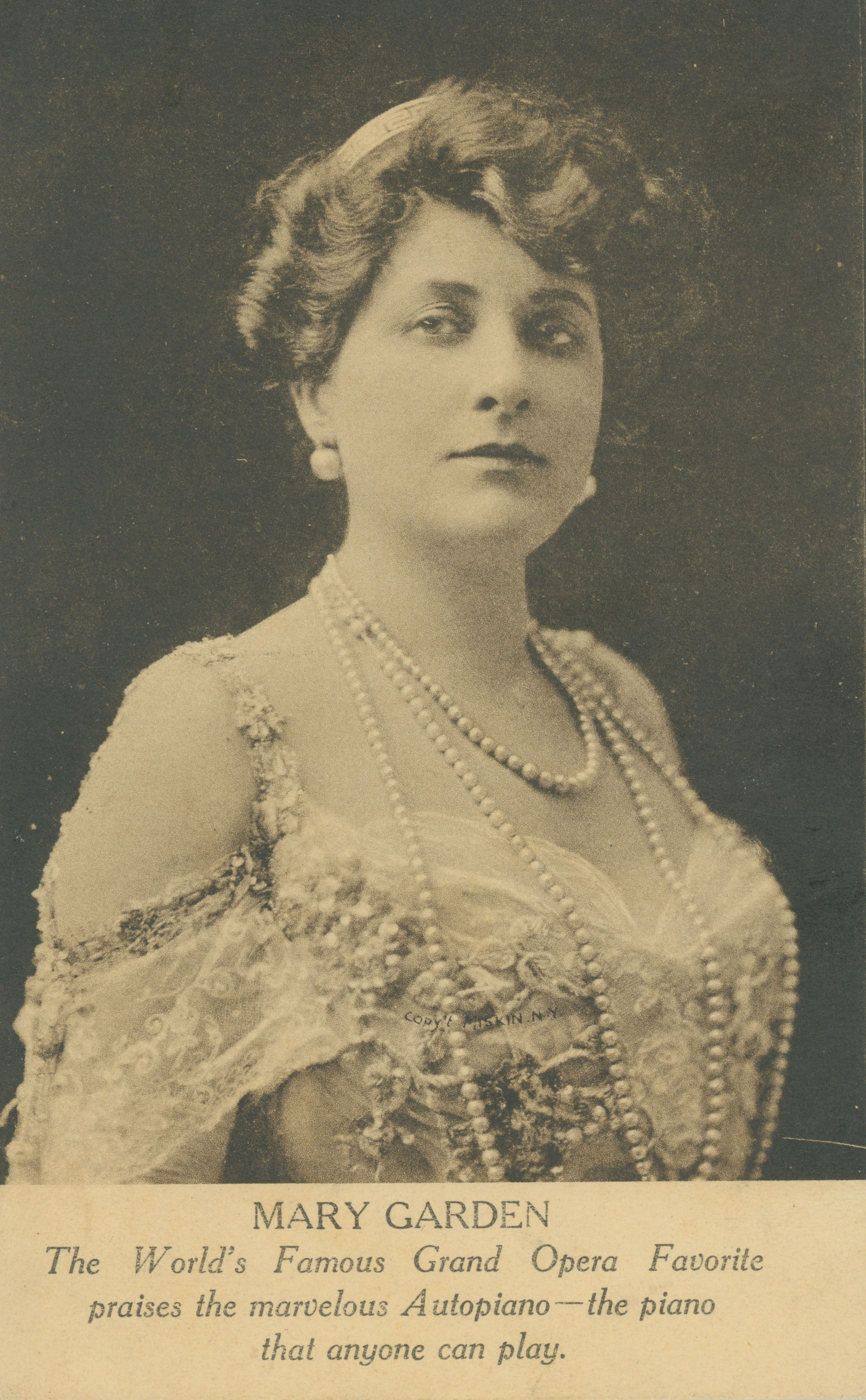
Mary Garden featured on an advertisement for the autopiano, 1910s

As portrayed in both her autobiography and Michael Turnbull's biography, Garden was an archetypal diva who knew exactly how to get her own way. She had a number of feuds with various colleagues from which she invariably emerged victorious, eventually ending up in control of the Chicago Opera. A relentless self-publicist, yet a woman of genuine beauty, her flamboyant personal life was often the subject of more attention than her public performances, and her affairs with men, real or imagined, were liable to emerge as scandalous rumours in the newspapers.

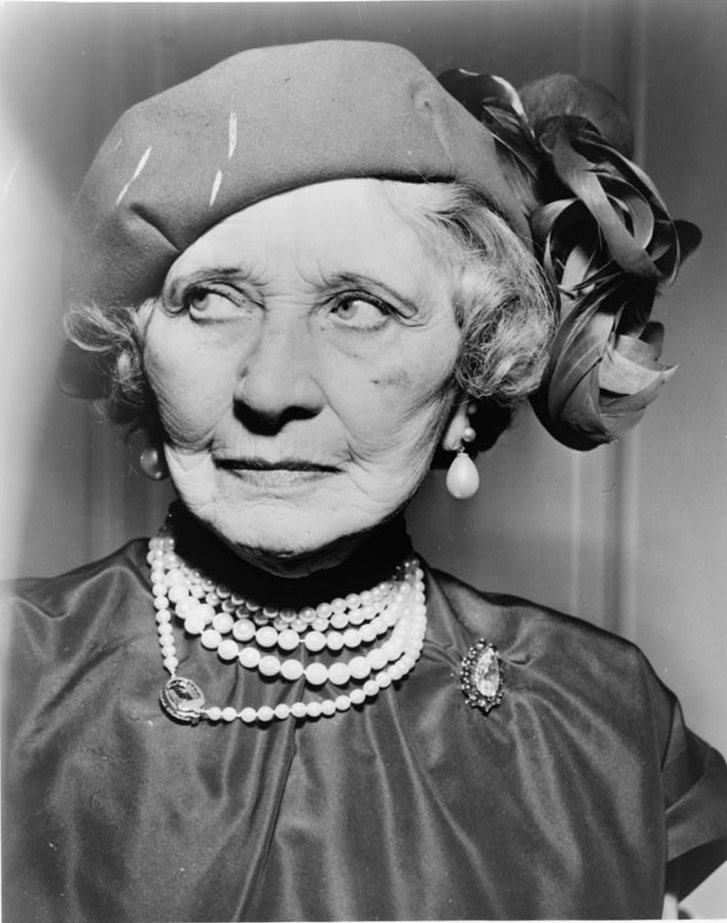
Mary Garden in 1954

Her autobiography, Mary Garden's Story (1951), is marred by inaccuracies. Always prone to embellish and exaggerate, Garden was already succumbing to dementia when the manuscript was being prepared.

It was in recognition of her personal history that Scottish Opera chose to present in their inaugural 1962 season Pelléas et Mélisande. That year marked the centenary of Debussy's birth and the diamond jubilee of the opera. By the time of the first performance Mary Garden was unable to accept her invitation to attend, being in hospital after a fall, and with her health in decline.

Mary Garden died in Inverurie, close to Aberdeen, where she spent the last 30 years of her life. An award for opera singing at the Aberdeen International Youth Festival is made in her name. There is a small memorial garden dedicated to her in the west-end of Aberdeen, with a small inscribed stone.

== Recordings and films ==
Mary Garden made about 40 gramophone records between 1903 and 1929 for G & T, Columbia and Victor. They continue to be reissued and are of interest to connoisseurs of historical recordings—although Garden herself was said to have been generally disappointed with the results. Of special interest are the four 1904 Black G&T recordings she made accompanied by Claude Debussy in Paris. There are also a small number of recordings made from radio broadcasts.

She made two silent films, Thais (1917) and a World War I romance entitled The Splendid Sinner (1918). Without her singing voice, her acting was criticized and neither film was a success. In the 1930s, Garden appeared on Cecil B. DeMille's Lux Radio Theater. One such airing had Garden and Melvyn Douglas reading the play Tonight or Never by Lili Hatvany) which had recently been made into a motion picture.

== Literary references ==
Garden is cited with other artistic figures of the period in Hugh MacDiarmid's poem A Drunk Man Looks at the Thistle (ll.30–2):

Whaur's Isadora Duncan dancin nou,
Is Mary Garden in Chicago still
And Duncan Grant in Paris – and me fou?

Allen Ginsberg contrasts the relative silence surrounding Garden's death with the uproar caused by the death of Jack Ruby in "Bayonne Turnpike to Tuscarora," from the 1973 award-winning collection The Fall of America:

Mary Garden dead in Aberdeen,
Jack Ruby dead in Dallas -
Sweet green incense in car cabin
...
New Years' 1967 come,
Reynolds Metals up a Half
Mary Garden, 92, sleeping tonite in Aberdeen

Garden and Ruby both died on 3 January 1967.
