= Lili Hutterstrasser-Scheidl =

Austrian composer (1882–1942)

Lili Hutterstrasser-Scheidl (October 7, 1882 - April 22, 1942) was an Austrian composer and member of the Nazi party, known by the pseudonym Lio Hans. Her opera Maria von Magdala was performed at the Vienna Volksoper on December 22, 1919, and was the only musical stage work by a female composer to be performed in Austria in the 20th century until Olga Neuwirth's Bählamms Fest in 1999.

== Life and career ==
Lili Hutterstrasser-Scheidl grew up in an upper-middle-class environment. In 1909 she married the general staff Doctor Hans Scheidl. In 1912 their daughter Amelia Christiane was born and in 1917 their second daughter Eleonore.

Her house in the Viennese Cottage district (Cottageviertel) became a meeting place for the Viennese theater and music scene. From 1905 her works, most of which were composed in the late Romantic style, were performed under the pseudonym Lio Hans in the Bösendorfer-Saal and in the Ehrbar Hall, amongst others. The contemporary critic Max Springer found it understandable that the composer had chosen a male pseudonym in view of prejudice against women at the time. The socio musicologist Ursula Simek suggests that Hutterstrasser-Scheidl was able to create a surprise effect when appearing at the end of a concert because of her pseudonym, as some reviews mentioned.

=== Maria von Magdala ===
The then-new director of the Vienna Volksoper, Felix von Weingartner, who was a friend of the Scheidl family, instituted the premiere of her opera Maria von Magdala and also conducted the performances. On the occasion of the premiere, Der Neue Tag wrote:

Of course – this is a lady's attempt as a dramatic composer. The fact that the debut work still has many shortcomings should not come as a surprise.

On the other hand, in the view of the Interessante Blatt:

Lio Hans' music demonstrates a rare mastery of craftsmanship in composition. In the invention of musical thought, there is sometimes a lack of originality, but there are passages of force and colour, which betray an unusual musical talent maturing towards perfection .

Overall, however, reviews generally ranged from lukewarm to scathing. Richard Blatka's libretto was also criticized.

=== Later Career and Nazi Affiliation ===
After 1919 the frequency of performances of her music decreased. In the early 1930s the couple encountered financial problems and in 1932 were forced to sell their villa. In 1938 Hutterstrasser-Scheidl joined the National Socialist Party and dedicated her Hymn for mixed choir with piano accompaniment, Wiener Frauendank, to Adolf Hitler. She gained a widespread reputation for her anti-semitic statements, claiming she received less performances due to "Jewish influence."

In 1942 she died largely unnoticed by the public, and a short obituary appeared in the Völkischer Beobachter .

Her estate is held by the Vienna City Library and the Austrian National Library.

In 1991, Ursula Simek evaluated Scheidl-Hutterstrasser's work in the Österreichische Musikzeitschrift as follows: :

Although her late-romantic, expressionistic tonal language never crosses the boundaries of tonality, her works are characterized by great modernity - in relation to her times. The combination of stylistic influences from Mahler, Strauss, etc. as well as the leading Italian composers with skillfully used rhythmic elements enabled her to create an interesting and strongly personal musical signature.

== Works (selected) ==
=== Songs (for voice and piano) ===
- Der Zigeuner, c. 1905
- Fromm, Text: Gustav Falke, c. 1905
- Todeslust, Text: Joseph von Eichendorff, c. 1905
- Stilles Glück, Text: Hugo Salus, c. 1907
- Helle Nacht, Text: Richard Dehmel after Paul Verlaine, c. 1907
- Vorfrühling, Text: Carl Pichler, c. 1908
- Unruhige Stunde, Text: Hans Bethge, c. 1908
- Heimwehlied, Text: Hans Bethge, c. 1908
- Lied in der Nacht, Text: Otto Julius Bierbaum, c. 1908
- Haltlos, Text: Ada Christen, c. 1908
- Sehnsucht, Text: Anna Ritter, 1909
- Nur ich und Du. Duet for soprano und baritone. Text: O. Siebenlist. 1909
- Blätterfall, Text: Heinrich Leuthold, 1909
- Märzensturm, Text: Anna Ritter, 1909
- Einsamkeit, Text: Anna Ritter, c. 1911
- In verschwiegener Nacht, Text: Anna Ritter, c. 1911
- Verzweiflung, Text: Anna Ritter, c. 1911
- Schlimme Zeichen, Text: Anna Ritter, 1912
- Sturmlied, Text: Anna Ritter, 1912
- Sturmnacht, Text: Anna Ritter, 1912
- Lied des buckligen Spielmanns, Text: Margarethe von Schuch-Mankiewicz, c. 1912
- Du wirst der Erste sein, 1922
- Geständnis einer Tänzerin, c. 1923
- Freudlose Liebe, Text: Anna Ritter, c. 1924
- Und hab' so große Sehnsucht doch, Text: Anna Ritter, c. 1924
- Die Haft, Text: Leo Grünstein, c. 1930
- Marsch, c. 1934
- Im Frühling, Text: F. Weber, 1934
- Bitte, Text: Hermann Hesse, before 1936
- Lied an Deutschland, Text: Franz Karl Ginzkey, 1940
- Sage von der Ewigkeit, Text: Franz Karl Ginzkey, 1940

Unknown dates:

- Der weiße Schwan
- Wiegenlied
- Letzte Liebe, Text: O. Eberhardt
- Dir zu Füßen, Text: K. Renner
- An der Tür, Text: Theresa Gröhe
- Hexenlied, Text: Dora von Stockert-Meynert
- Der Geiger zu Gmünd, Text: Justinus Kerner

=== Stage works ===
- Maria von Magdala. Opera in three acts. Libretto: Richard Batka. 1914
- Die Stickerin von Treviso. Opera in three acts. Libretto: Heinrich Regel. Between 1915 and 1925
- Legende vom Brunnen der brennenden Herzen. Opera. A Cycle of 6 Tableaus. Libretto: Beatrice Dovsky. 1919
- Die Tänzerin von Schemacha. Libretto: Heinrich Regel. c. 1920
- Die sieben Todsünden oder das zweite Ich. Pantomime. Libretto: Heinrich Regel. 1925
- Santa Borgia. Mimische Phantasie. Libretto: Rose Silberer. um 1931

=== Choral and orchestral works ===
- Die Bambusflöte. Song for voice and orchestra. Between 1910 und 1912
- Cello Concerto, 1911
- Träumerei. For cello and orchestra, before 1914
- Die Hexe. Poem for baritone and large orchestra. Text: Heinrich Glücksmann, c. 1914
- Am heiligen See. Song for voice and orchestra. Text: Ohotsuno Ozi. 1924
- Frauenhymne. For mixed choir and piano/orchestra. Text: Else Ehrlich. 1928
- Marsch. Chorus for male voices (and piano). Text: F. Weber. Um 1934
- Wiener Frauendank. Hymn for mixed choir with piano accompaniment. Text: Marie Hoheisel. Dedicated to Adolf Hitler, c. 1938

Unknown dates:

- Trio. For orchestra
- Scherzo. For orchestra
- Tanz der Geisha. For orchestra
- Totgebet. Song for voice and orchestra. Text: Richard Specht.

=== Other ===
- Theuredanks Brautfahrt. Melodrama for speaking voice and piano. Text: Richard Specht. 1922
