= Anny Felbermayer =

Austrian opera singer (1924–2014)

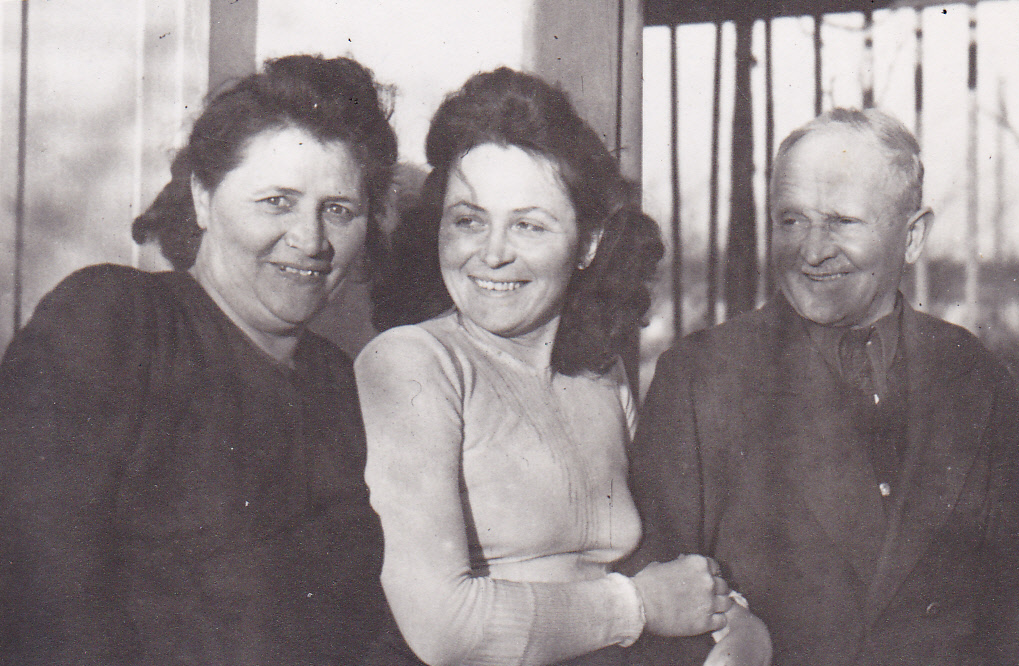
- The soprano with her parents (1949)
- Born: Anna Maria Felbermayer-Szekely; 21 July 1924; Vienna, Austria
- Died: 5 September 2014 (aged 90); Vienna, Austria
- Education: Wiener Musikakademie
- Occupation: Operatic soprano
- Organization: Vienna State Opera

Anny Felbermayer (21 July 1924 – 5 September 2014) was an Austrian soprano in opera and concert. The lyric soprano was a long-term member of the Vienna State Opera. She appeared in many operas by Richard Strauss, including the premiere of his Die Liebe der Danae at the Salzburg Festival in 1952.

== Career ==
Born Anna Maria Felbermayer-Szekely in Vienna to a family of craftsmen, she attended a Handelsschule. She studied piano and voice privately, then at the Wiener Musikakademie, with E. Rado, P. Mark-Neusser and J. Witt, graduating in 1949. She was awarded the Cebotari-Preis in Vienna, and was a winner at international competitions in Geneva and Verviers.

She made her debut on the opera stage in 1950 at the Vienna State Opera, which then played at the Theater an der Wien, as a servant in Flotow's Martha. The lyric soprano was a member of the ensemble until 1982, and appeared with the company in 54 roles in 979 performances, including Mozart's Le nozze di Figaro, in which she appeared as Barbarina and Susanna, and many operas by Richard Strauss.

Felbermayer performed in Vienna in 1950 in Cherubini's Les deux journées with the Niederösterreichisches Tonkünstlerorchester, conducted by H. Täubler. She worked in Mozart's Figaro with both Erich Kleiber, and with Karl Böhm in 1957 at the Salzburg Festival, where she also appeared in Mozart's Idomeneo. In Vienna, she performed as Nanette in a 1960 new production of Lortzing's Der Wildschütz, and as Sandmännchen and Taumännchen in Humperdinck's Hänsel und Gretel. She appeared in many operas by Strauss, including as Echo in Ariadne auf Naxos, as Zdenka in Arabella, and in Intermezzo in 1963. Felbermayer created the role of Xanthe in the posthumous premiere of his Die Liebe der Danae conducted by Clemens Krauss at the 1952 Salzburg Festival. She appeared at the Vienna State Opera in 1970 in his Die ägyptische Helena, a performance that was recorded. She performed the role of Blanchefleur in a concert performance of Kienzl's Der Kuhreigen, and was Lucy in Weill's Die Dreigroschenoper.

Felbermayer also sang regularly at La Scala, La Monnaie, Liceu, the Graz Opera, and at the Salzburg Festival, where she appeared from 1952 almost every year. She appeared in concert and on radio in Vienna, and in Germany and Italy. She died in Vienna.

== Awards ==
- 1969: Austrian Decoration for Science and Art
- 1983: Austrian Kammersängerin

== Recordings ==
- Bach: Weichet nur, betrübte Schatten, BWV 202 (1952), choir and orchestra of the Bach Guild conducted by Felix Prohaska
- Bach: Wachet auf, ruft uns die Stimme, BWV 140, choir and orchestra of the Bach Guild conducted by Felix Prohaska
- Bach: Christ lag in Todes Banden, BWV 4, choir and orchestra of the Bach Guild conducted by Felix Prohaska
- Mozart: Sämtliche Lieder (Complete songs, 1956), with Eric Werba (piano)
- Haydn: Stabat Mater (1952), chamber orchestra of the Wiener Symphoniker, Akademie Kammerchor, Hans Gillesberger
- Antonín Dvořák: Zigeunermelodien Op. 55 and Johannes Brahms: Songs in Folk Style, with Viktor Graef (piano)
- Richard Strauss: Lieder, with Alfred Poell (baritone), Viktor Graef (piano)
- Gustav Mahler: Frühe Gesänge und Lieder aus letzter Zeit. Alfred Poell (bass), orchestra of the Vienna State Opera, conducted by Felix Prohaska
- Humperdinck: Hänsel und Gretel, Sandmännchen and Taumännchen (London 1953), with Philharmonia Orchestra and English school choirs, conducted by Herbert von Karajan
