= Leo Blech =

German opera composer and conductor

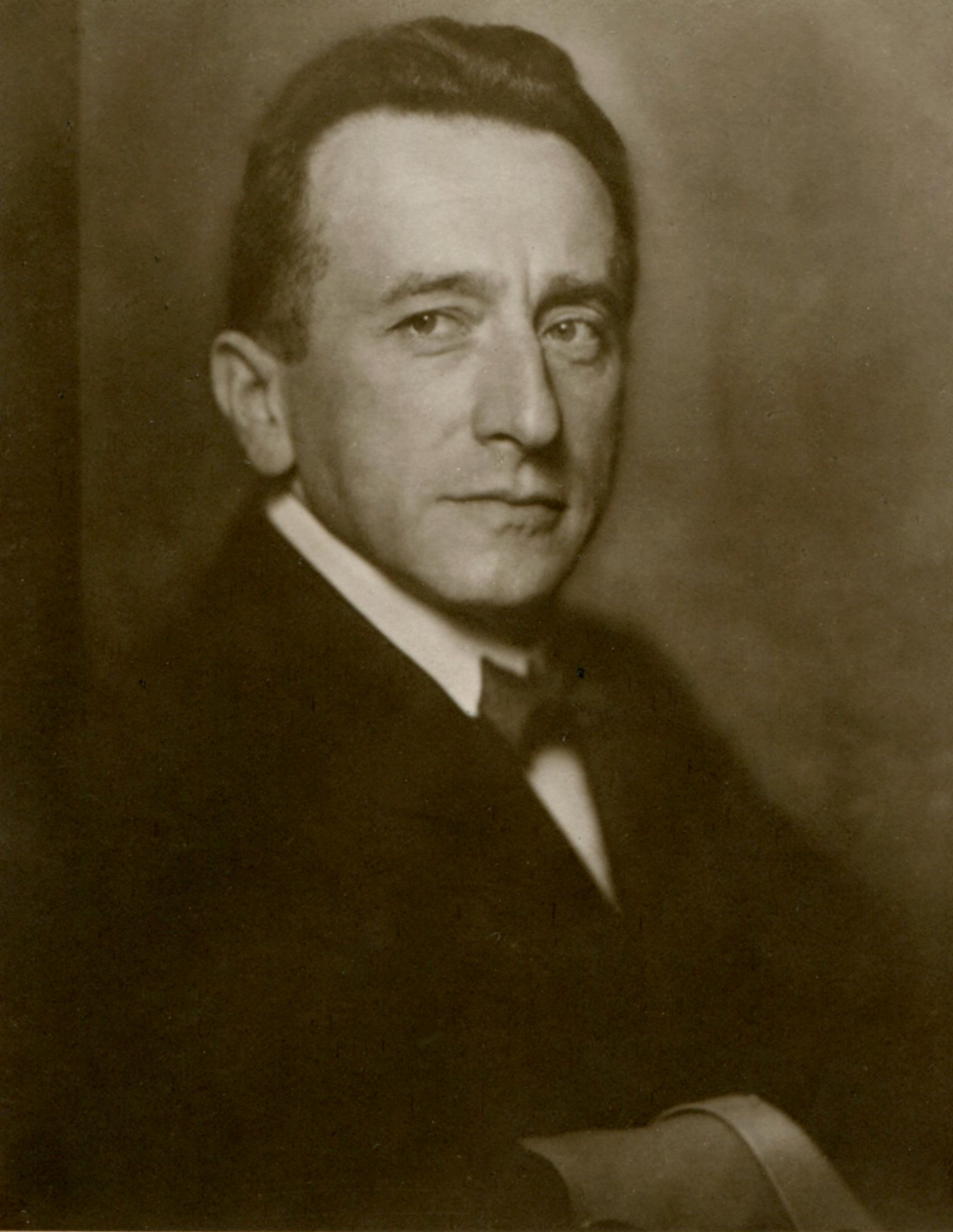
- Leo Blech, photograph by Nicola Perscheid, Berlin 1910
- Born: April 21, 1871; Aachen, Rhenish Prussia, German Empire
- Died: August 25, 1958 (aged 87); West Berlin, West Germany
- Occupations: Conductor, composer
- Years active: 1893–1953
- Known for: Conductor at the Berlin State Opera, Städtische Oper, and Stockholm Royal Opera
- Notable work: Carmen (conducted over 600 times)

Leo Blech (21 April 1871 – 25 August 1958) was a German opera composer and conductor who is perhaps most famous for his work at the Königliches Opernhaus (later the Berlin State Opera / Staatsoper Unter den Linden) from 1906 to 1937, and later as the conductor of Berlin's Städtische Oper from 1949 to 1953. Blech was known for his reliable, clear, and elegant performances, especially of works by Wagner, Verdi, and Bizet's Carmen (which he conducted over 600 times), and for his sensitivity as an accompanist.

== Early life and education ==
Blech was born to a Jewish family in Aachen, Rhenish Prussia. After attending the Hochschule in Berlin where he studied piano with Ernst Rudorff and composition from Woldemar Bargiel, he studied privately with Engelbert Humperdinck.

== Career ==
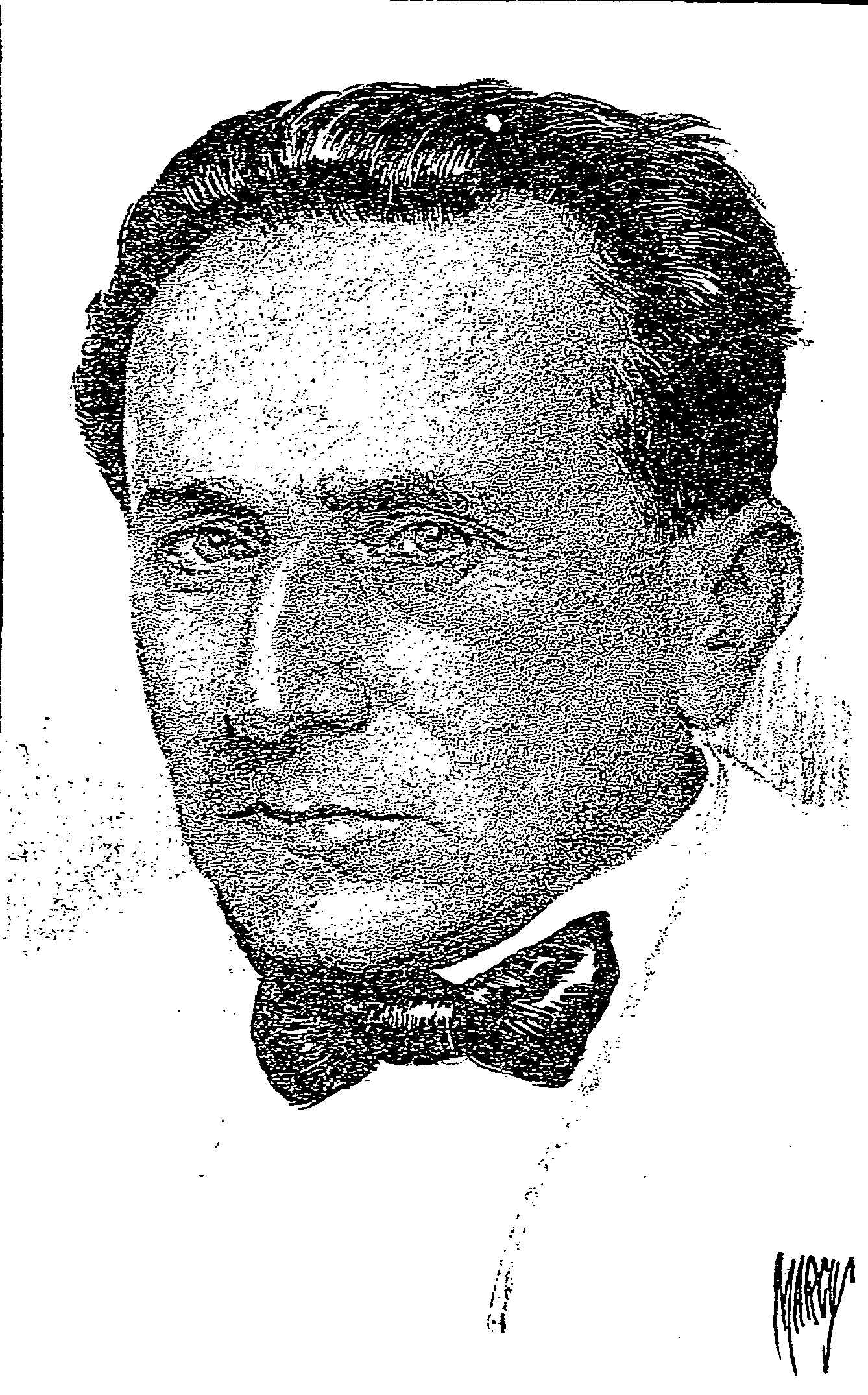
Drawing of Leo Blech by Edwin Marcus for the NY Times in 1923

After working briefly in sales, he landed a position conducting at the Stadttheater Aachen in 1893. From 1899 to 1906, he conducted at the Neues Deutsches Theater in Prague before moving to the Königliches Opernhaus in Berlin. In 1913, he was promoted to general music director. Between 1923 and 1926, he took various positions at opera houses in Berlin and Vienna, including the Deutsches Opernhaus, the Volksoper Berlin and the Vienna Volksoper. In 1926, he returned to the Staatsoper unter den Linden, where he remained until Adolf Hitler's antisemitic policies forced him in 1937 into exile in Riga, the capital of Latvia, where he conducted the Latvian National Opera and Ballet Theatre.

With an eye to Blech's substantial German and foreign reputation, Hermann Göring, then Hitler's second in command, issued an order to Major Karl Heise, head of the Schutzpolizei in German-occupied Riga in September 1941, to issue an exit visa to Blech for neutral Sweden, making him the only Jewish survivor in Riga to escape as a result of such high-level intervention.

During and after World War II, Blech conducted at the Stockholm Royal Opera. In 1949, he returned to Berlin to conduct at the Städtische Oper (Civic Opera), where he worked until 1953. One of his pupils, conductor Herbert Sandberg, married his daughter Luise (Lisel) (1913–2006).

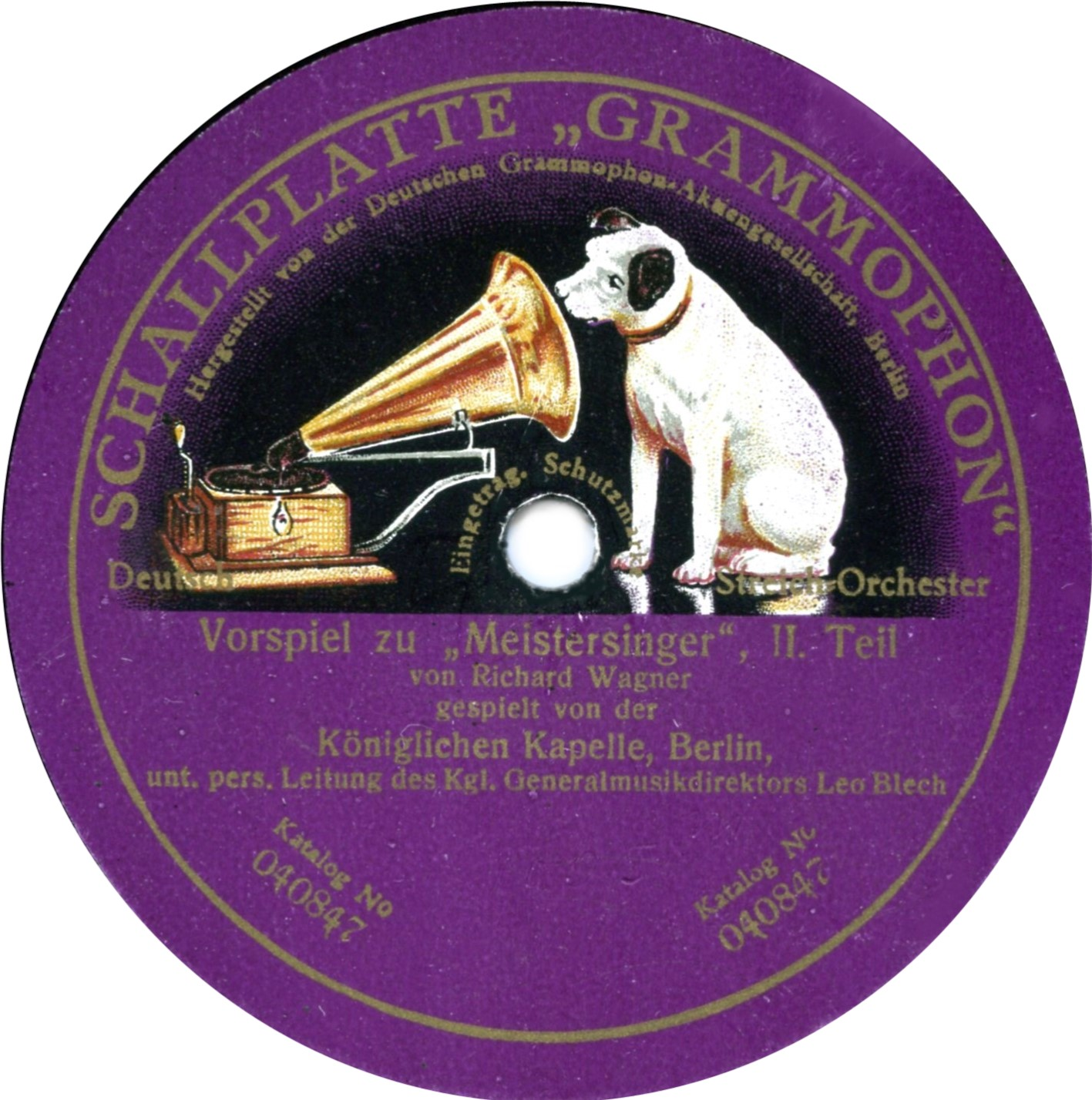
One of the first recordings of Blech and the Royal Court Orchestra, Berlin Summer 1916

Blech made recordings of operatic and orchestral music for the Deutsche Grammophon, His Master's Voice, Ultraphon/Telefunken, Decca, and Elite record labels.

== Compositions ==
- Aglaja (opera, Aachen 1893)
- Cherubina (opera, Aachen 1894)
- Von den Englein (female chorus 1898)
- Sommernacht (mixed chorus 1898)
- Waldwanderung (orchestral work, 1901)
- Gavotte for cello and piano op. 10b (1902)
- Das war ich! (opera, Dresden 1902, text by Richard Batka)
- Alpenkönig und Menschenfeind (reworking of opera from Ferdinand Raimund, Dresden 1903)
- Aschenbrödel (opera, Prague 1905)
- Versiegelt (opera, Hamburg 1908)
- Kinderlieder: songs for small and big folks for voice and piano (6 volumes, 1913–1926)
- Rappelkopf (revised version of Alpenkönig und Menschenfeind, Berlin 1917)
- Die Strohwitwe (operetta, Hamburg 1920)

Blech also composed orchestral works, choral works, chamber works, and songs.

== Sources ==
- Ernst Rychnovsky: Leo Blech: Eine biographisch-ästhetische Studie. Dürerblatt, Prag 1905.
- Ernst Rychnovsky: "Leo Blech." In: Monographien moderner Musiker, vol. 2. Kahnt, Leipzig 1907. p. 52–64.
- Walter Jacob (Ed.): Leo Blech: Ein Brevier anläßlich des 60. Geburtstages. Prismen-Verlag, Hamburg 1931.
- Leo Blech: "Ich war Kapellmeister des Königs." In: Radio-Revue. 1955, issue 13–22. Ullstein, Berlin.
- Leo Blech: "Die Bilanz." In: Josef Müller-Marein, Hannes Reinhardt: Das musikalische Selbstportrait von Komponisten, Dirigenten, Instrumentalisten, Sängerinnen und Sänger unserer Zeit. Nannen, Hamburg 1963, pp. 113–123.
- Wolfgang Poch: Leo Blech: Ein Beitrag zur Berliner Theatergeschichte unter besonderer Berücksichtigung der musikdramaturgischen Einrichtungen und der Spielplanpolitik Leo Blechs. Dissertation. Freie Universität Berlin, 1985.
- Peter Aistleitner, Wolfgang Poch, Günter Walter: Leo Blech. (Discography.) In: Stimmen die um die Welt gingen. Ein Magazin. issue 47. Münster 1995, p. 1–88.
- Manfred Haedler: "Leo Blech – des Kaisers 'letzter General'." In: Berlin in Geschichte und Gegenwart: Jahrbuch des Landesarchivs Berlin 1998. Gebrüder Mann, Berlin 1998, ISBN 3-7861-1810-8, p. 105–119.
- "Kommen Sie in Ihre Heimat zurück!": Briefe von, an und über Generalmusikdirektor Leo Blech. In: Sinn und Form 2002, issue 5, p. 629–646.
- Andrej Angrick, Peter Klein: Die "Endlösung" in Riga: Ausbeutung und Vernichtung 1941–1944. Wissenschaftliche Buchgesellschaft, Darmstadt 2006, ISBN 3-534-19149-8, p. 131f.
- Fred K. Prieberg: Handbuch Deutsche Musiker 1933–1945. 2. edition. Kiel 2009, ISBN 978-3-00-037705-1, p. 490f (1 CD-ROM).
- Jutta Lambrecht / Centrum Judaicum (editors): Leo Blech: Komponist – Kapellmeister – Generalmusikdirektor. Hentrich & Hentrich, Berlin 2015, ISBN 978-3-95565-091-9 (= Jüdische Miniaturen, vol. 173).
- Jutta Lambrecht: Leo Blech. Dirigent und Komponist (1871–1958), February 2021, im Portal Rheinische Geschichte (retrieved 24 November 2022)
- Jutta Lambrecht: Dem Mimen flicht die Nachwelt keine Kränze. Leo Blech zum 150. Geburtstag. In: musica reanimata, Mitteilungen, Nr. 106, 2021, S. 1–13.
- Oliver Wurl: Leo Blech und die Schallplatte. In: Contributions to the history of the record industry, Vol. 12. Gesellschaft für historische Tonträger, Vienna 2022, ISBN 978-3-9502906-6-0, p. 10–26.
- Jutta Lambrecht: "Ich würde Ihnen folgen, wohin Sie wollen, [...] sogar zu den Botokuden" Leo Blech - Engelbert Humperdinck - eine lebenslange Freundschaft. In: Hokuspokus Hexenschuss, Band 3 - Festschrift Engelbert Humperdinck zum 170. Geburtstag. Michael Imhof Verlag, Petersberg 2025, ISBN 978-3-7319-1496-9, S. 88–101.
