= Tom von Dreger =

Austrian painter

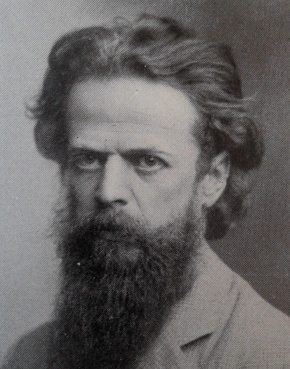
Tom von Dreger

Tom von Dreger (2 October 1868 – 30 July 1948; full name Thomas Richard von Dreger) was an Austrian portrait, history, and genre painter.

== Life and work ==
Tom von Dreger was born to Austro-Hungarian Colonel Gottfried Eugen Edler von Dreger (1827 – 8 December 1907) and his wife, Mary née Greaves. He studied at the Academy of Fine Arts Vienna from 1884 to 1885 and again from 1887 to 1888, where he was taught by painters August Eisenmenger, Siegmund L'Allemand, and Heinrich von Angeli. Following his studies in Vienna, Dreger traveled to Venice, where he studied at the Academy of Fine Arts of Venice under Eugene de Blaas and Ludwig Passini. He then spent a year at the Munich Academy under the guidance of Alexander von Liezen-Mayer. In 1892, he moved to Paris and studied for seven years at the prestigious Académie Julian. During his time in Paris, he exhibited regularly at the Exhibition of the National Society of Fine Arts under the name T. R. de Dreger from 1893 to 1899.

In 1892, Dreger married Henriette Allesch, with whom he had five children, Martha, Marie, Gottfried, Ruth, and Lea.

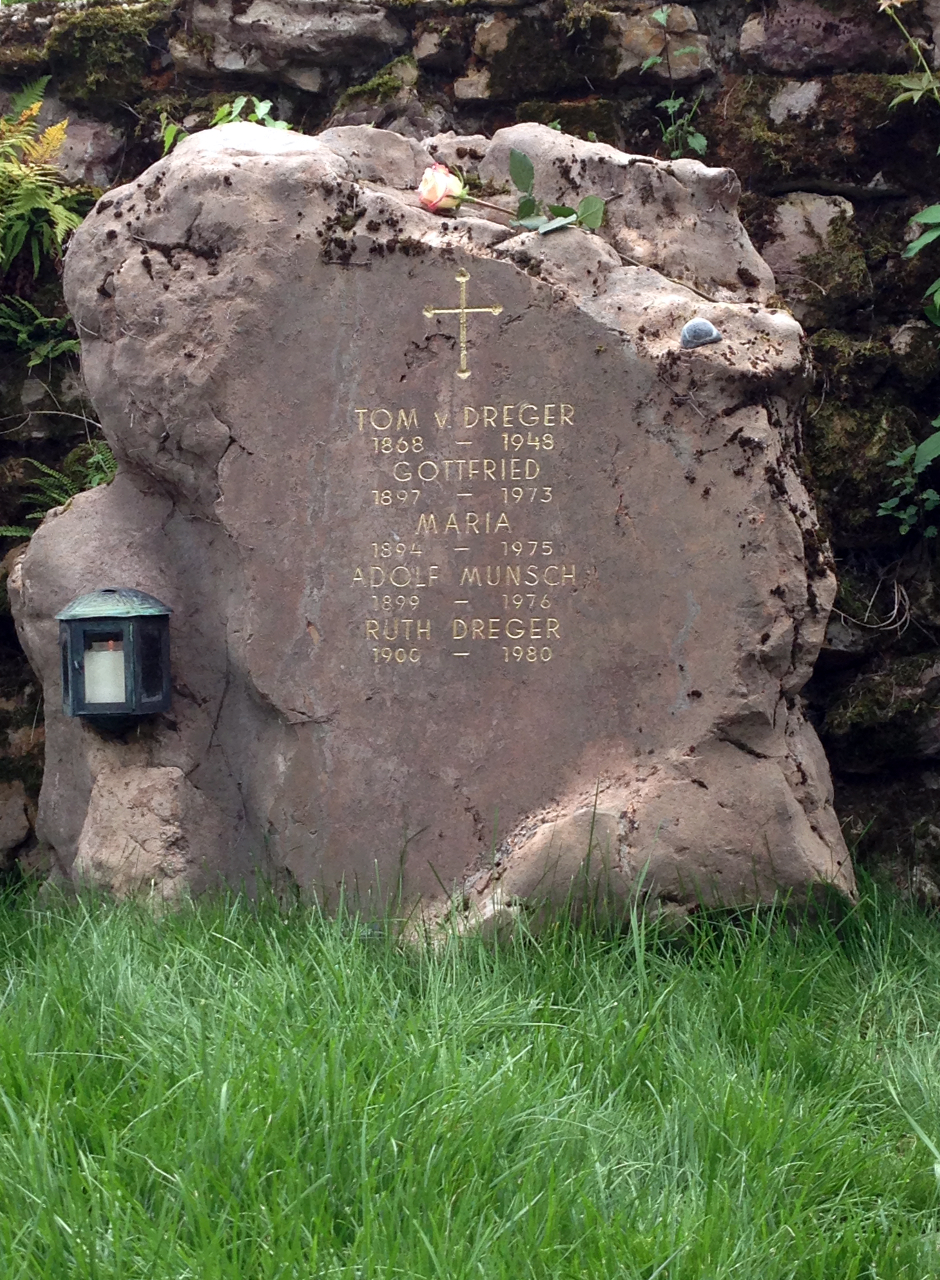
Gravesite of Tom von Dreger and his family

After his time in Paris, Dreger lived in his residence in Neuschloss. In 1906, he permanently settled in Vienna, where he continued his artistic work. From Vienna, he went on numerous study trips to Transylvania, Germany, Italy, Sweden, the Netherlands, and the United States. In 1916, he created two altar paintings for the Votivkirche in Vienna and became the preferred portrait artist of the Austrian imperial family.

Throughout his career, Dreger produced many portraits of statesmen, clergy, and prominent figures from business, science, and the arts. Many of his works remain in private collections, though some are held in public institutions, including the painting collection of the Museum of Military History in Vienna and public buildings such as the Federal Ministry for Arts, Culture, the Civil Service and Sport, and the Historical Museum in Vienna.

Since 2014, Dreger’s honorary grave has been located at the Neustift Cemetery in Vienna.

== Exhibitions ==
- 1893–1899: Salons de la Société nationale des beaux-arts, Paris
- 1897: Great German Art Exhibition, Berlin
- 1903: 38th Annual Exhibition,Vienna Künstlerhaus
- 1931: Exhibition of one hundred works from the years 1888–1931, organized by the Austrian Artists’ Association at the Kaiser Josef Stöckl, Augarten

== Selected works ==
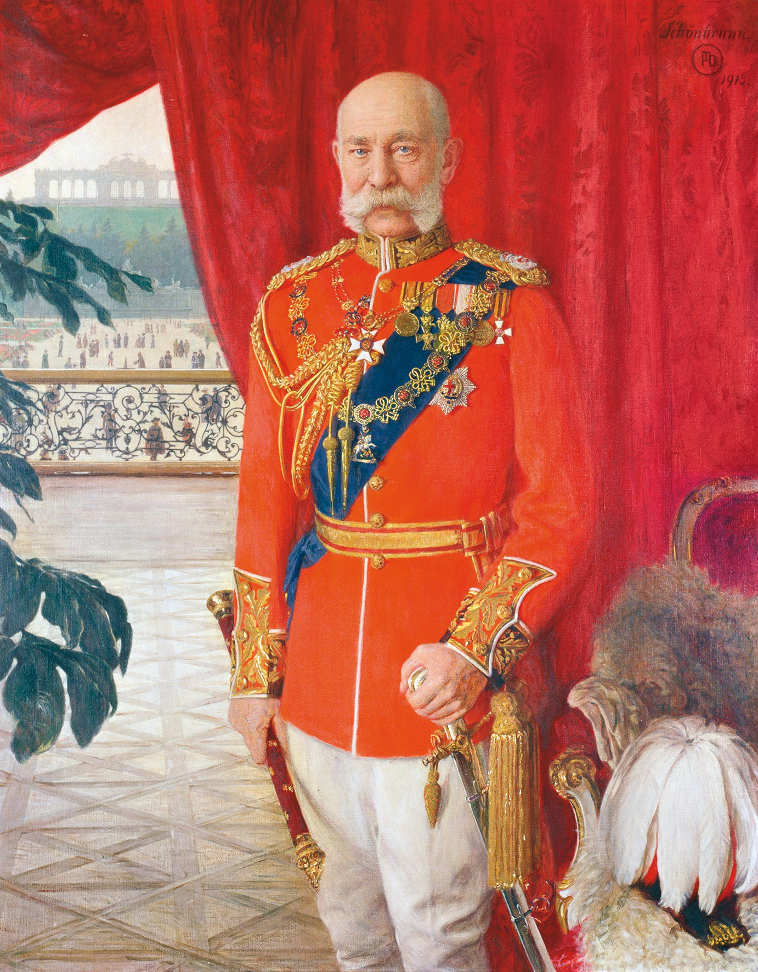
Emperor Franz Joseph I. in Schönbrunn Palace

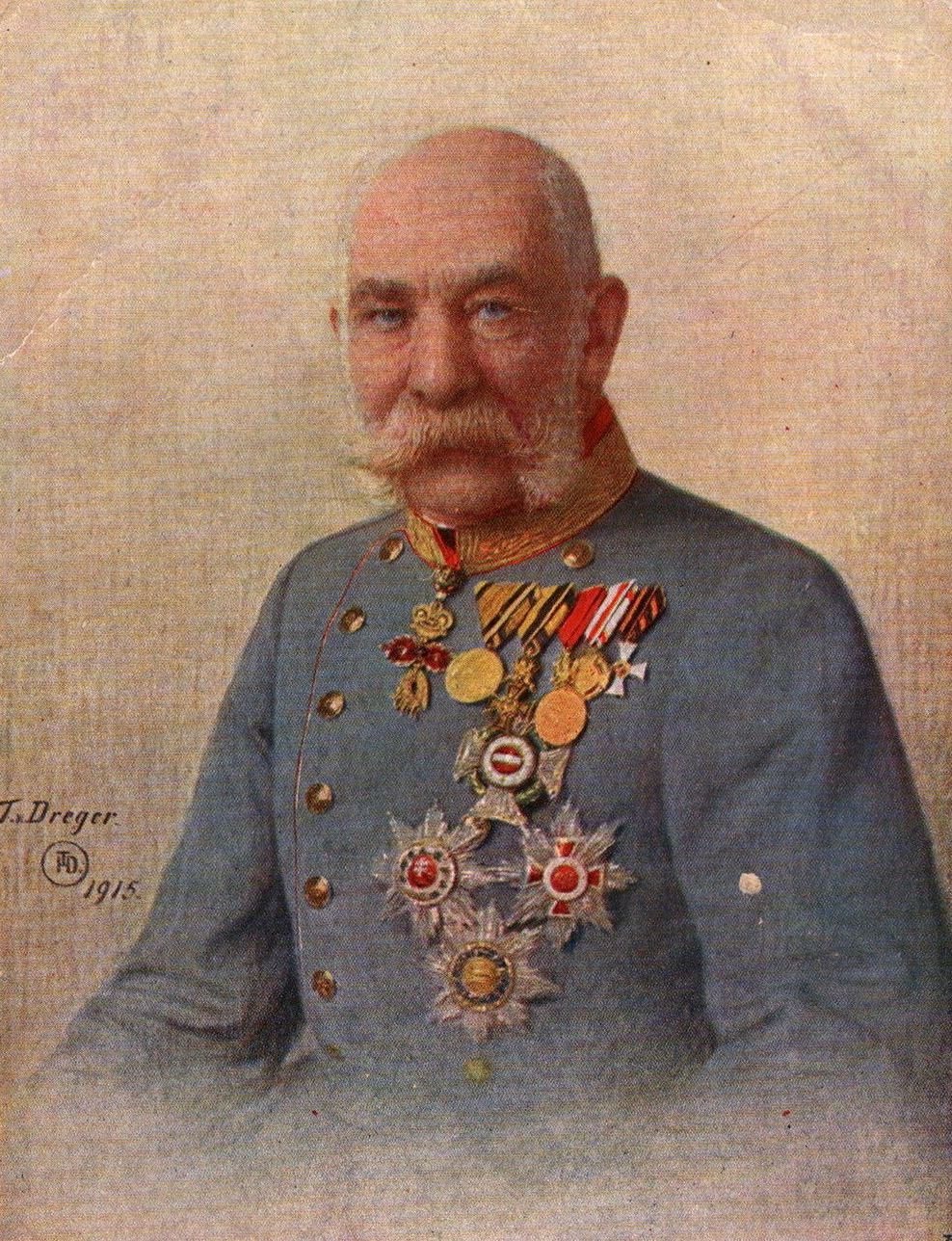
Emperor Franz Joseph I. in a Generals uniform

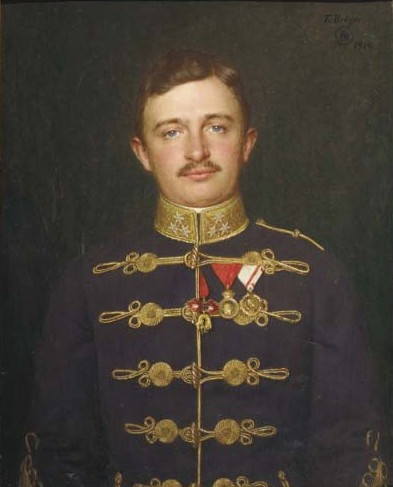
Archduke Carl Joseph Of Austria

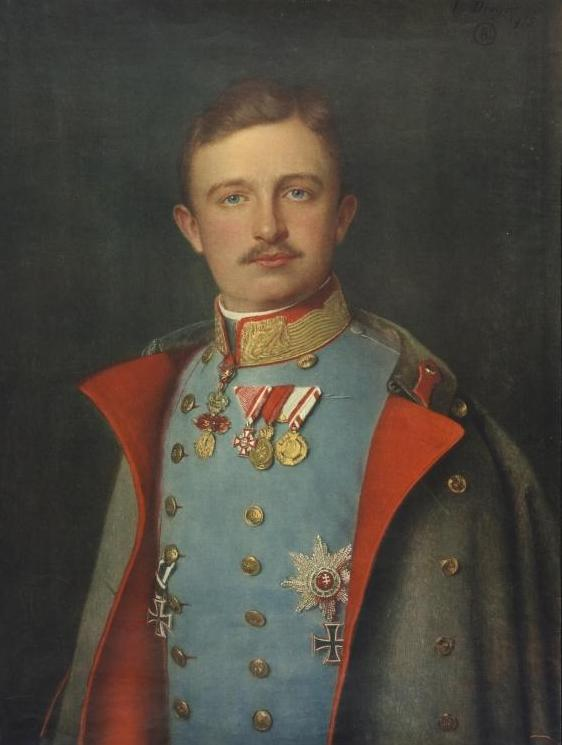
Emperor Charles I. of Austria-Hungary

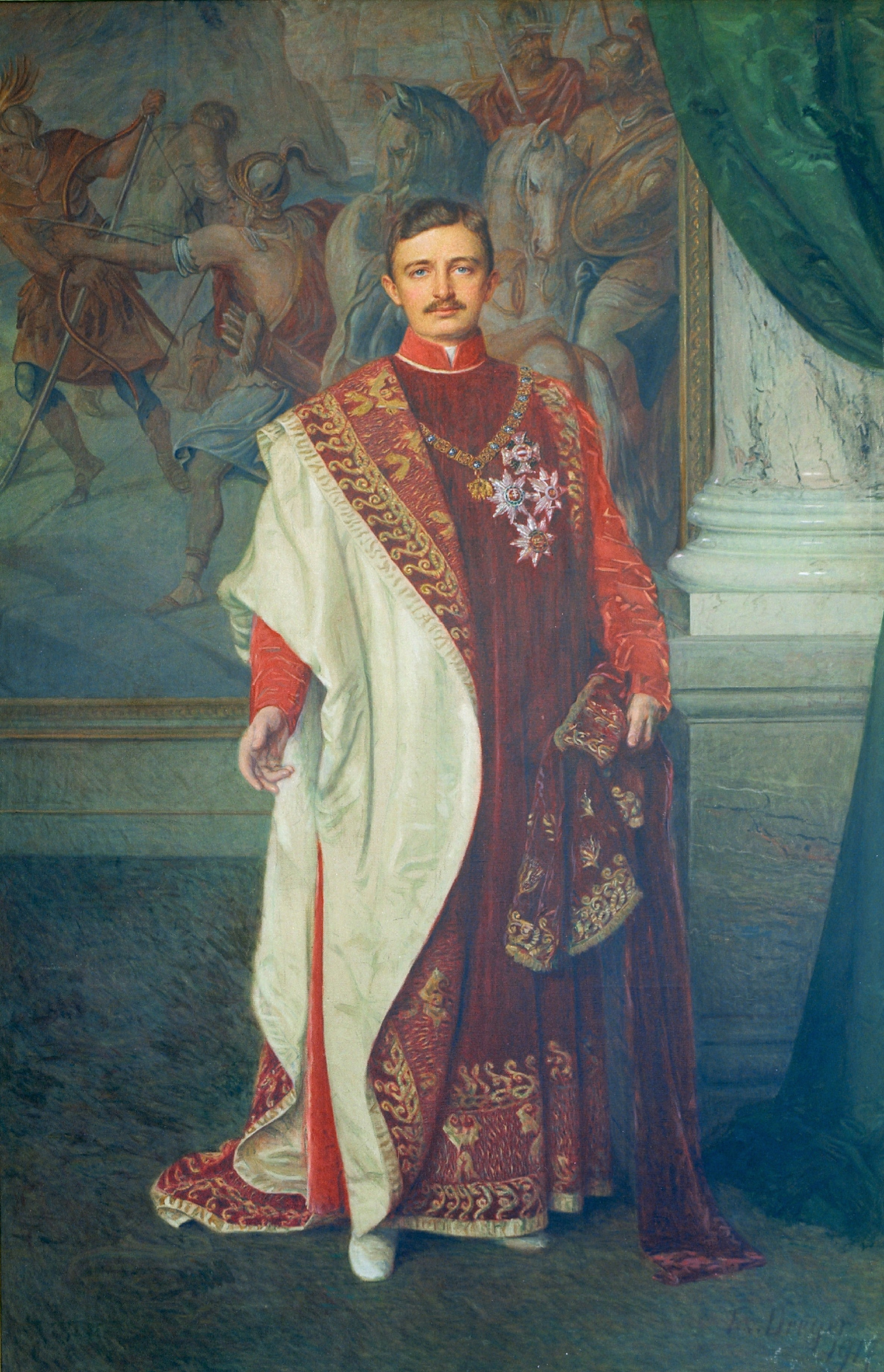
Emperor Charles I. in vestments of the Order of the Golden Fleece

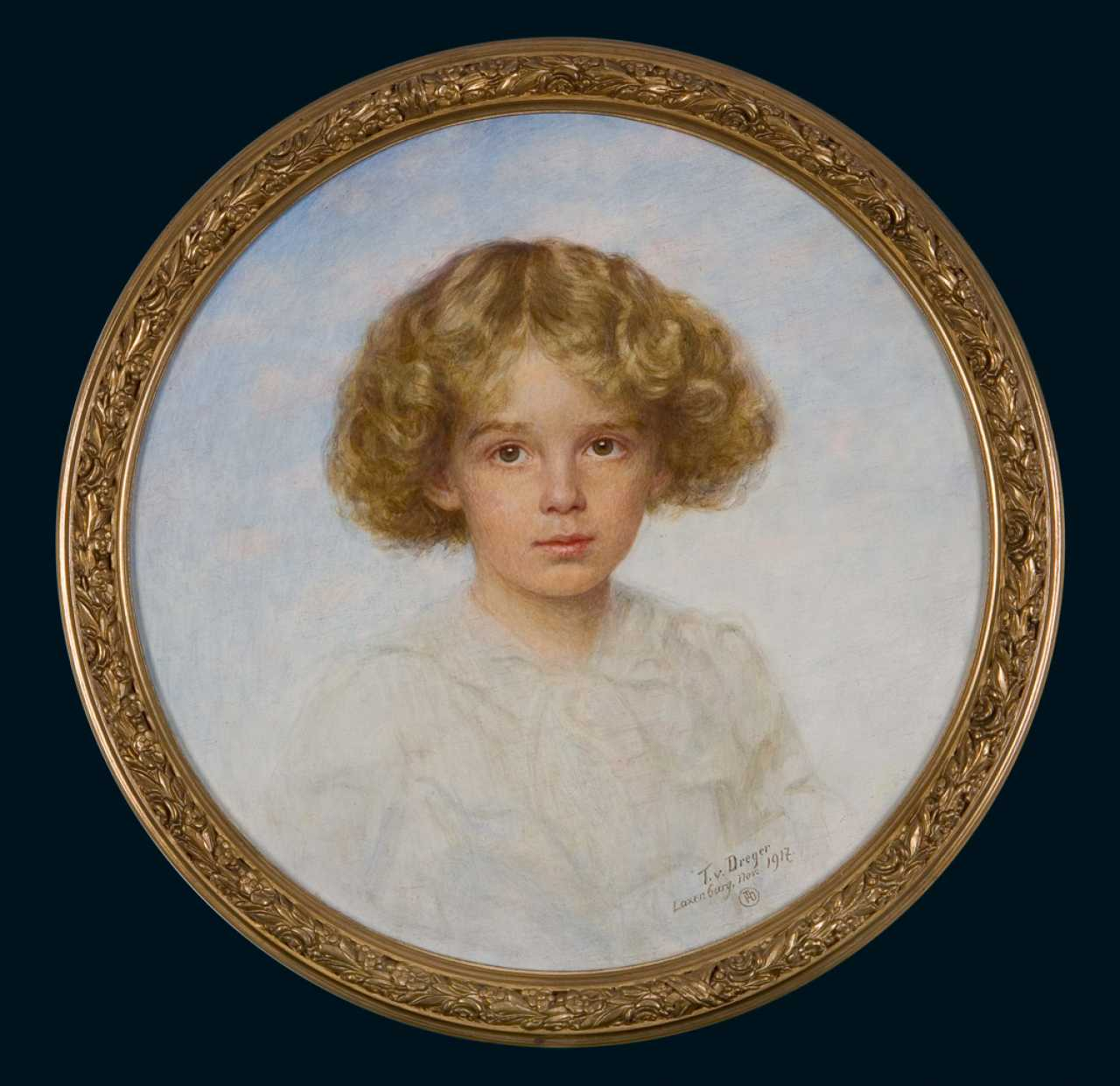
Crown Prince Otto of Austria-Hungary

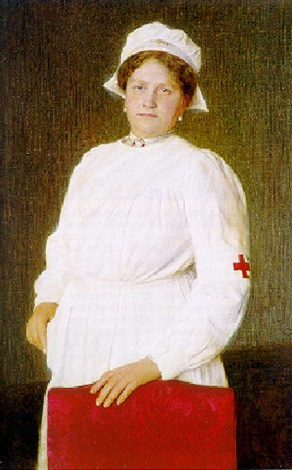
Archduchess Maria Josepha in a nun's habit

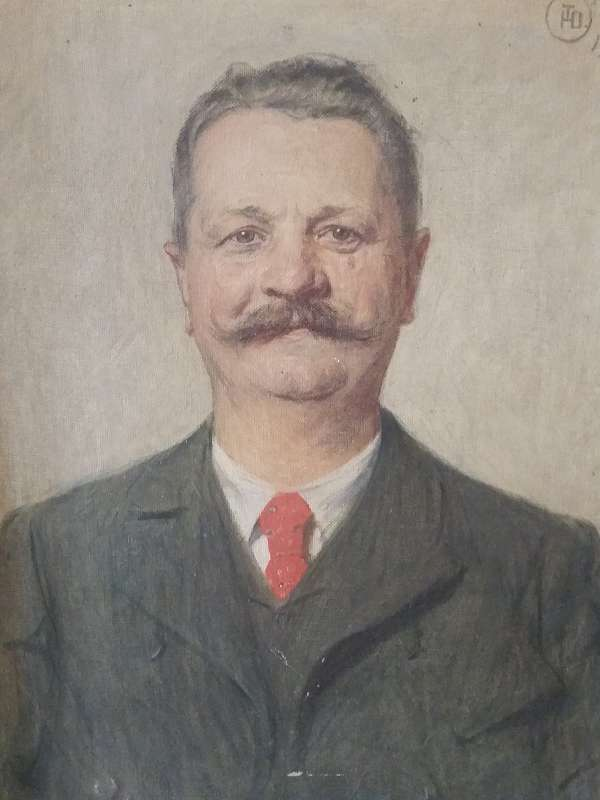
Architect Josef Drexler

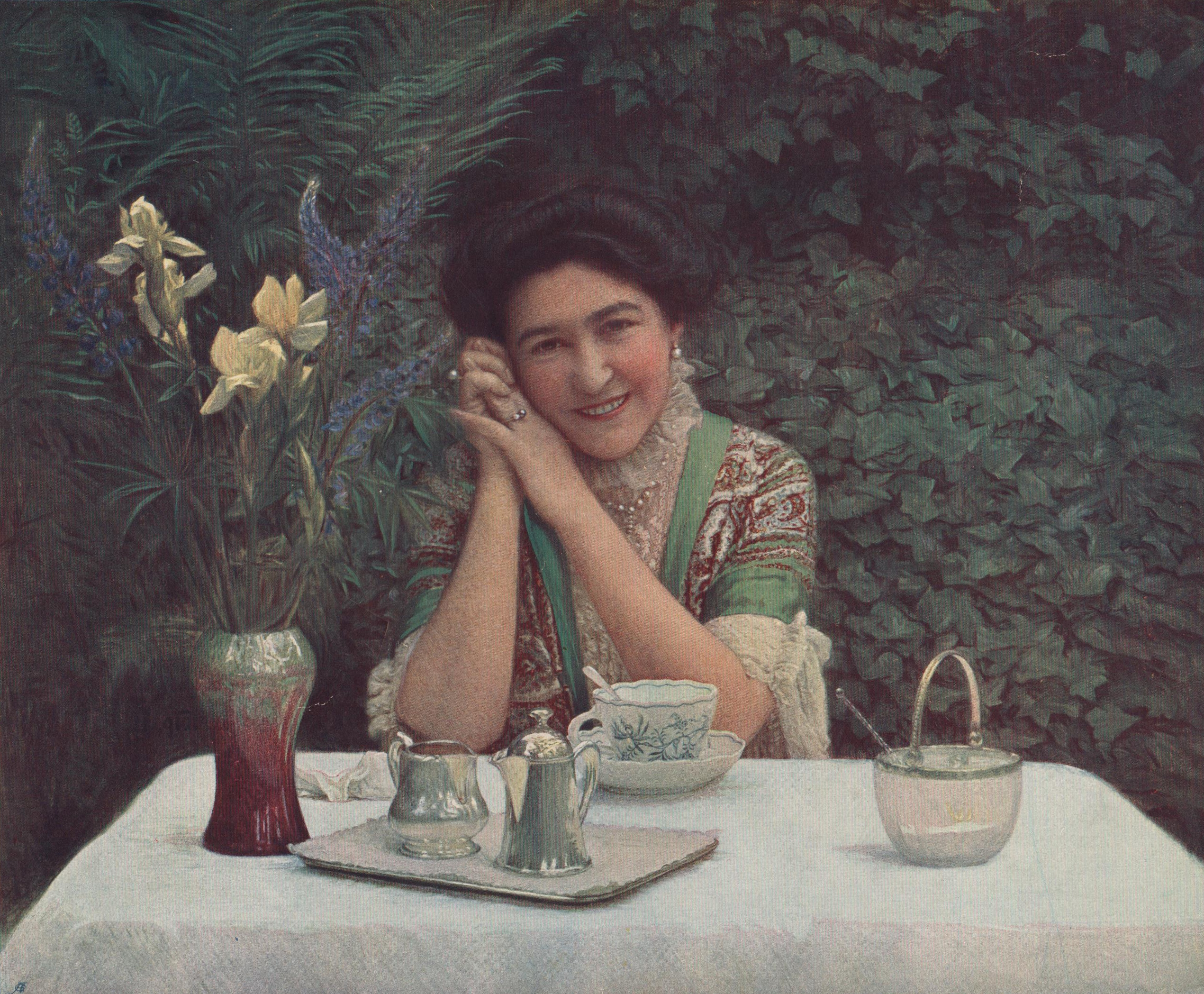
Selma Kurz-Halban

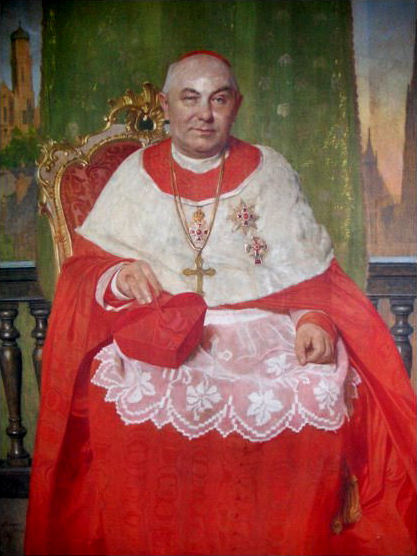
Cardinal Friedrich Piffl

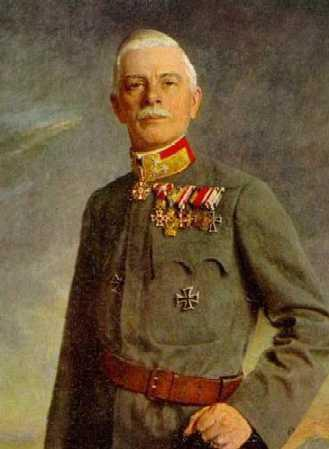
Rudolf Stöger-Steiner von Steinstätten in a Generals uniform

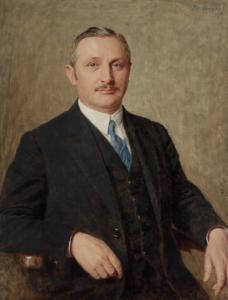
Chancellor Rudolf Ramek

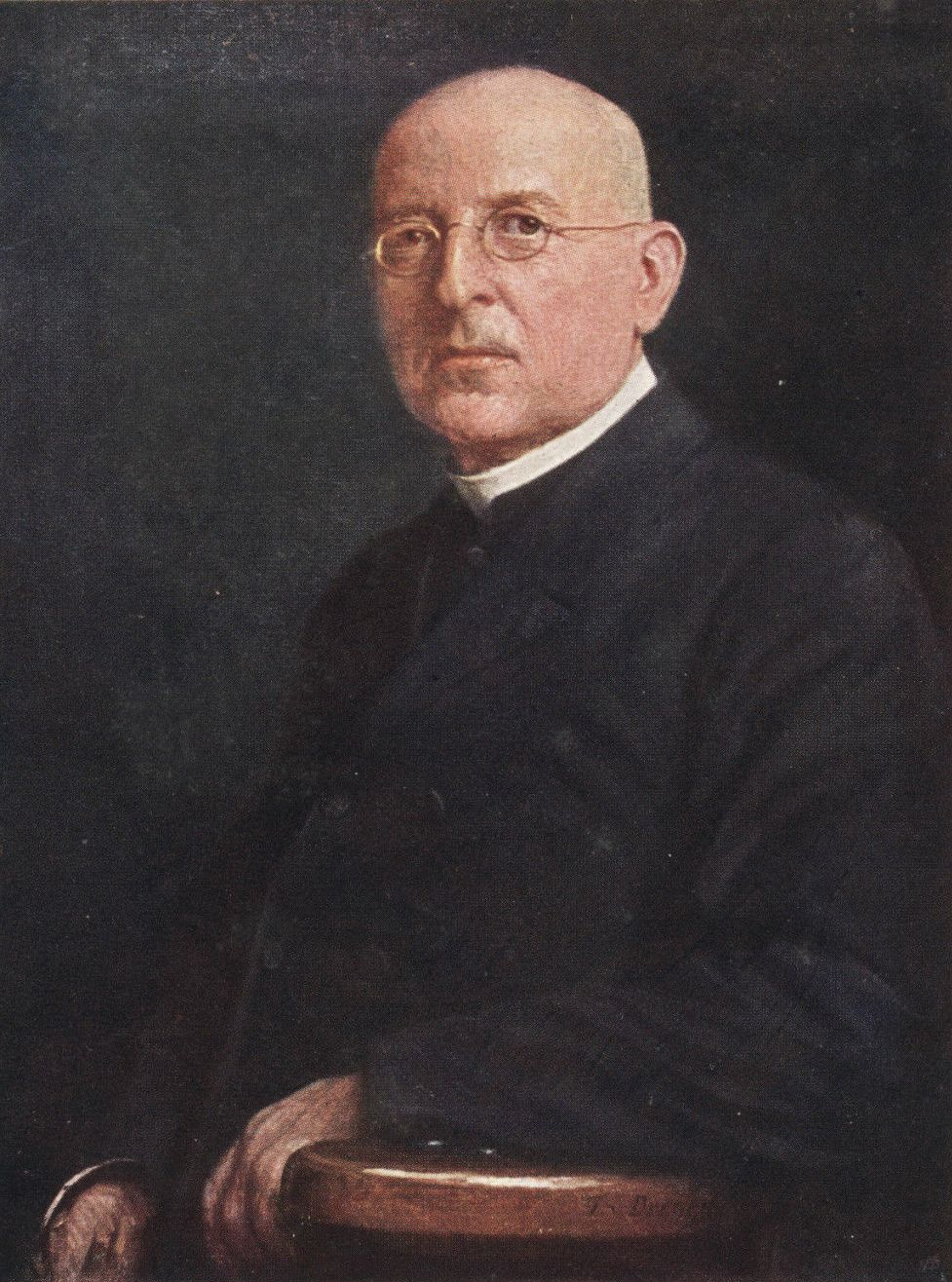
Federal Chancellor Ignaz Seipel

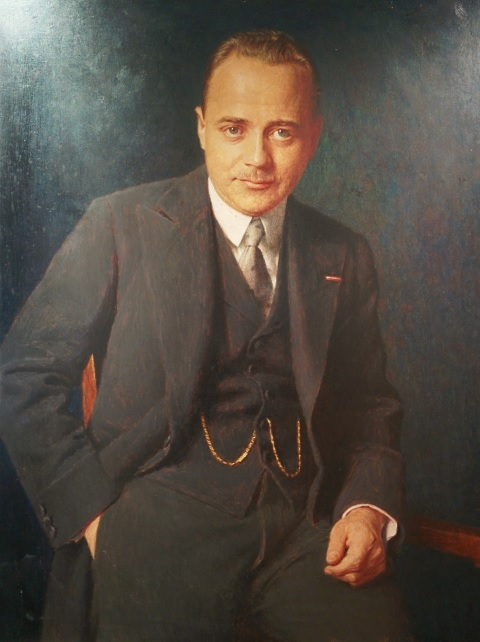
Chancellor Engelbert Dollfuss

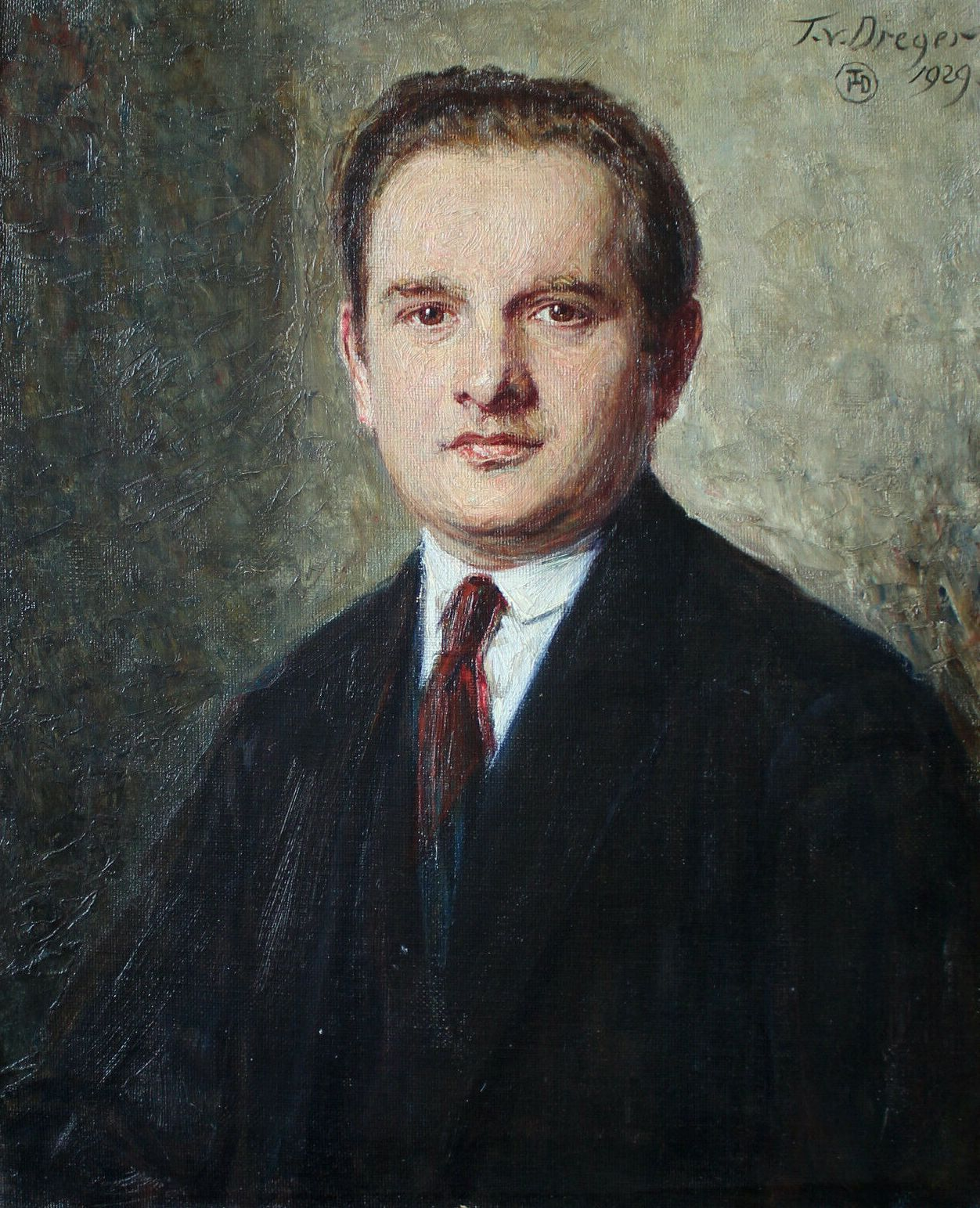
Josef Koller, painter

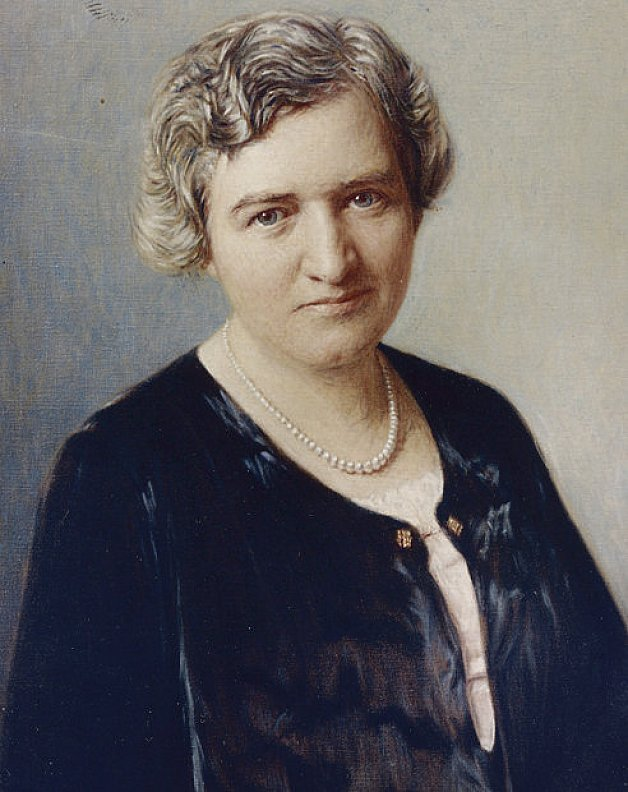
Hildegard Burjan

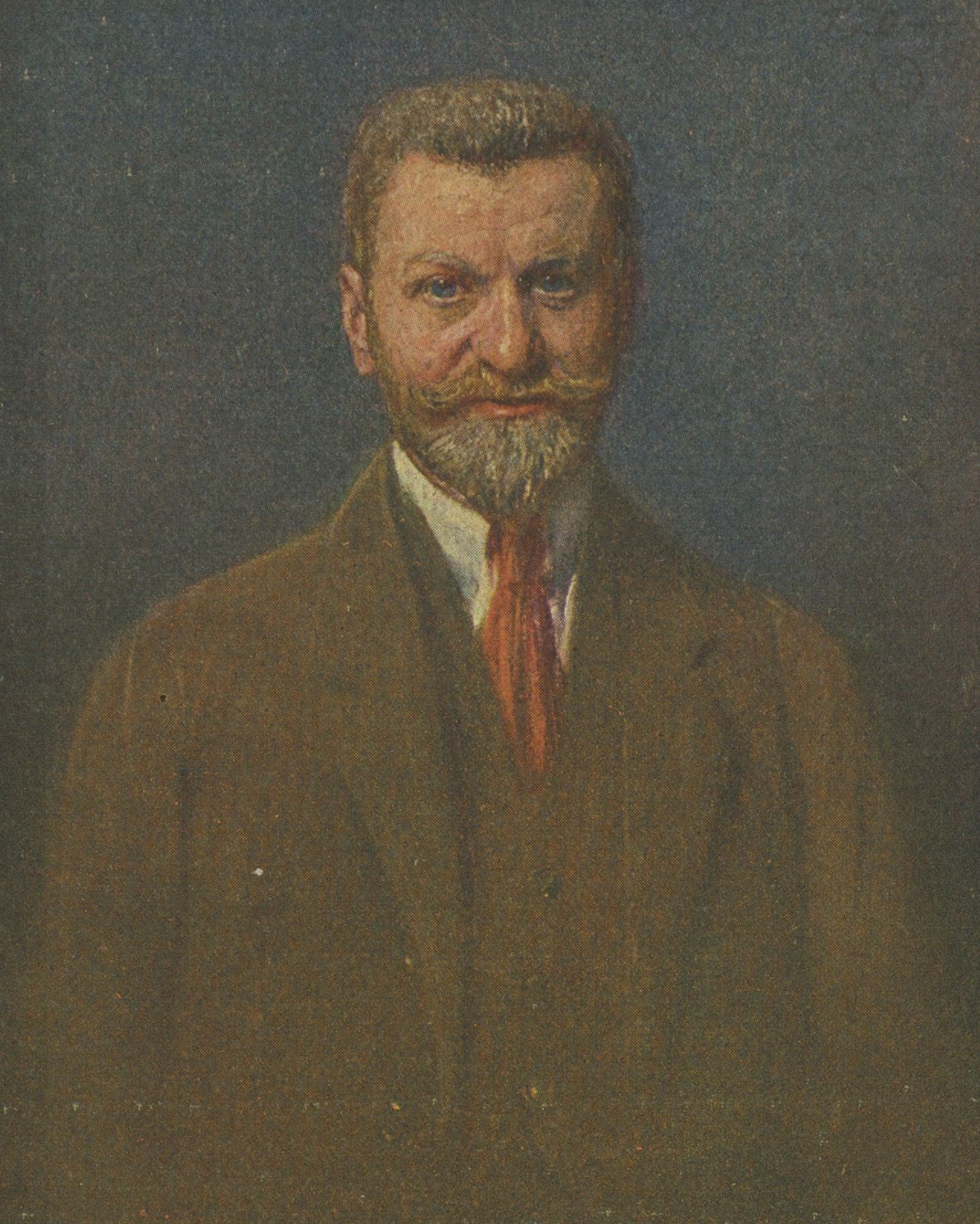
Richard Stöhr

=== Portraits ===
- 1899 Leo Belmonte, painter friend in Paris
- 1910 Emil Hertzka
- 1911 Leo and Maguerite Belmonte
- 1913 Emperor Franz Joseph I.
- 1913 Josef Drexler
- 1915 Felix Ritter von Mayer-Tenneburg, president of the Austrian Tourist Club
- 1916 Archduchess Maria Josepha
- 1916 Alexander von Krobatin
- 1917 Emperor Charles I. (multiple times)
- 1917 Crown Prince Otto
- 1917 Cardinal Friedrich Gustav Piffl
- 1917 Rudolf Stöger-Steiner von Steinstätten
- 1925 Federal Chancellor Ignaz Seipel (5 portraits)
- 1929 Josef Koller
- 1932 Hildegard Burjan
- 1933 and 35/36 Cardinal Theodor Innitzer (among others in full regalia)
- 1934 Carl Freiherr von Karwinsky and his wife
- 1934 Federal Chancellor Engelbert Dollfuss, (multiple, among others: in the parliamentary club of the Austrian Peoples Party Vienna; oil on canvas, approx. 90×70 cm in the Museum of Military History Vienna)
- 1934 Pope Pius XI.
- 1934 Guido Adler
- 1934 Kurt von Schuschnigg and his wife
- 1937 Federal Chancellor Rudolf Ramek
- 1946 Ludwig Adamovich senior (1890–1955) as rector of the University of Vienna 1945–1947

=== Religious paintings ===
- 1916 Adoration of Christ and Last Supper, two altarpieces for the Votive Church in Vienna
- 1924 Altarpiece Saint Madeleine Sophie Barat for the monastery church Sacré-Cœur Pressbaum

=== Genre paintings ===
- 1912 The Color Thief
- 1912 Romanian Beggar
- 1916 The Adoration
- 1919 The Old Violinist
- 1940 Vienna’s Hundred-Year-Old Washerwoman

=== Writings ===
- 1918 Painting Exhibition. Military Casino, Vienna.
- 1946 How I Learned to See, Vienna, Holzhausen’s Successors (publisher).

== Sources ==
- Hermann A. Ludwig Degener: Who’s Who. Our Contemporaries. Arani-Verlag, Berlin 1937.
- Paul Emödi, Robert Teichl: Who’s Who. Lexicon of Austrian Contemporaries. Vienna 1937.
- Dreger, Tom von. In: Austrian Academy of Sciences (ed.): Austrian Biographical Lexicon. Volume 1, 3rd issue, Böhlau, Vienna 1956, p. 199
- Heinrich Fuchs: The Austrian Painters of the 19th Century. Vienna 1973, Volume 1, p. K 70.
- Heribert Sturm: Biographical Lexicon on the History of the Bohemian Lands. Oldenbourg, Munich 1974.
- Rudolf Schmidt: Austrian Artists’ Lexicon from the Beginnings to the Present. Volume 1, Vienna 1980.
- Felix Czeike: Historical Lexicon of Vienna. Volume 2, Vienna 1993.
