= Wilibald Nagel =

German musicologist and music critic

Wilibald Nagel (also Willibald Nagel, (12 January 1863 – 17 October 1929) was a German musicologist and music critic.

== Life and career ==
Born in Mülheim an der Ruhr Nagel, son of the Lieder and oratorio singer Siegfried Nagel (d. 1874), studied German studies and musicology with Philipp Spitta and Heinrich Bellermann at the Humboldt University of Berlin. In 1888 he habilitated and accepted a position at the University of Zurich for musicology and taught there as a lecturer at the faculty of philosophy until 1894.

After that he lived in England for study purposes until 1896 and after his return to Germany he worked as a music writer in Cleve. In 1898 Nagel was appointed as a lecturer in musicology at the Technical University Darmstadt, in 1905 he was appointed professor. at the Akademie für Tonkunst there he gave piano lessons and directed the Academic Singing Association. From 1913 to 1917 he lived as a writer in Zurich. From 1917 to 1921 Nagel was editor and editor of the bi-monthly Neue Musik-Zeitung.

In 1921 he became teacher for piano, music theory and history at the Württembergische Hochschule für Musik and took over the music department at the Süddeutsche Zeitung.

Nagel became known among other things through his co-authorship of the three-volume work General History of Music by Richard Batka. His research on Mozart is also acknowledged in Karl Storck's Mozart - His Life and Work (1908). His treatises on Die Nürnberger Musikgesellschaft (1588-1629) are quoted in several subsequent music-historical works.

His nationalist-reactionary attitude and his aesthetic politicization of the term Worldview as a journalist is evident, among other things, in his position on the Pfitzner-Bekker controversy to "musical impotence" and in articles like Der Futurismus – eine undeutsche Erscheinung, in which he resorts to polemical expressions such as "mindless ridiculousness" and turns against the composers of New Music - among others Ferruccio Busoni, Arnold Schoenberg, Josef Matthias Hauer.

Nagel was a member of the Berlin masonic lodge since 1897 Friedrich Wilhelm zur Morgenröthe.

Nagel died in Stuttgart at age 66.

== Publications ==
- Die deutsche Idylle im 18. Jahrhundert. A. Stutz, Wädensweil o. J. (1887).
- Die neueren dramatisch-musikalischen Bearbeitungen der Genovefa-Legende. Ein Beitrag zur Geschichte der Oper. Habilitations text at the University of Zürich. Albert Unflad, Zürich/Leipzig 1888.
- Johannes Brahms als Nachfolger Beethoven's. Gebr. Hug, Leipzig 1892.
- Annalen der englischen Hofmusik von der Zeit Heinrichs VIII. bis zum Tode Karls I. (1509–1649). Breitkopf & Härtel, Leipzig 1894.
- Geschichte der Musik in England, I. Trübner, Strassburg 1894–97.
- Die Entwickelung der Musik in Frankreich und England. Habilitationsschrift an der Technische Hochschule zu Darmstadt. Reuther & Reichard, Berlin 1898.
- Goethe und Beethoven. Lecture, held in the assembly hall of the Grand Ducal Technical University in Darmstadt on the importance of the Goethe Monument. Beyer, Langensalza 1902.
- Beethovens „Heiligenstädter Testament“. In Die Musik. (1901/1902), Heft 12 = 1. Beethoven-Heft, pp. 1050–1058.
- Goethe und Mozart. Vortrag. Beyer, Langensalza 1904.
- Gluck und Mozart. Vortrag. Beyer, Langensalza 1905.
- Die Musik im täglichen Leben. Ein Beitrag zur Geschichte der musikalischen Kultur unserer Tage. Beyer, Langensalza 1907.
- Studien zur Geschichte der Meistersänger. Beyer & Söhne, Langensalza 1909. Musikalisches Magazin issue 27.
- Beethoven und seine Klaviersonaten. 2 volumes. Beyer & Söhne, Langensalza 1903–1905. (2. erw. Publisher: Beyer & Söhne, Langensalza 1923/24)
- Kleine Mitteilungen zur Musikgeschichte aus Augsburger Akten. In Sammelbände der Internationalen Musikgesellschaft. Vol. 9. (1907–1908) pp. 145–154.
- Zur Lebensgeschichte August Eberhard Müllers. In Die Musik. 9, issue 4, 1909/10, pp. 84–92.
- Allgemeine Geschichte der Musik. 3 volumes. With Richard Batka. Grüninger, Stuttgart 1909–1915.
- Geschichte der Musik im Umriß. With Heinrich Adolf Köstlin. Breitkopf & Härtel, Leipzig 1910.
- Kleine Beethoveniana. In Sammelbande der Internationalen Musik-Gesellschaft. Volume 12 (1910–1911) pp. 586–588.
- Christoph Graupner als Sinfoniker. Zusammenfassende Bemerkungen (nebst thematischem Kataloge der Sinfonien). Beyer, Langensalza 1912.
- Die Musik als Mittel der Volkserziehung. Wesen und Bedeutung der Programm-Musik. Vorträge, geh. im Württembergischen Goethe-Bunde zu Stuttgart. Beyer, Langensalza 1912.
- Mozart und die Gegenwart. Beyer, Langensalza 1912.
- Joseph Haydn. Vortrag, gehalten im Hess. Goethe-Bund in Darmstadt. Beyer, Langensalza 1913.
- Über die Strömungen in unserer Musik. Kritische Randbemerkungen zur modernen Kunst. Beyer, Langensalza 1913.
- Über den Begriff des Hässlichen in der Musik. Ein Versuch. Beyer, Langensalza 1914.
- Die Klaviersonaten von Joh. Brahms. Techn.-ästhet. Analysen. Grüninger, Stuttgart 1915.
- Ferruccio Busoni als Ästhetiker. In Neue Musik-Zeitung. 15, 1917.
- Wilhelm Mauke. Universal Edition, Vienna 1919.
- Paul Hindemith Mörder, Hoffnung der Frauen – Das Nusch-Nuschi. Zwei Opern Einakter. Uraufführung im Württ. Landestheater zu Stuttgart am 4. Juni. In Neue Musik-Zeitung. 19, 1921.
- Johannes Brahms. J. Engelhorns Nachf., Stuttgart 1923.
- Beethoven Romantiker? In 1. Kongreßbericht. Beethoven-Zentenarfeier Wien, 26. bis 31. März 1927. Veranstaltet von Bund und Stadt, unter dem Ehrenschutz des Herrn Bundespräsidenten Dr. Michael Hainisch. Internationaler Musikhistorischer Kongress. Universal-Edition, Vienna 1927.

== Literature ==
- Friedrich Blume (ed.): Die Musik in Geschichte und Gegenwart. Volume 9, p. 1248f. Bärenreiter, Kassel 1961.
- Karin Steinbeck: Nagel, Willibald. In Stadtlexikon Darmstadt online.
