= Der Kuhreigen =

- Opera by Wilhelm Kienzl
- Kienzl
- Librettist: Richard Batka
- Language: German
- Based on: Rudolf Hans Bartsch's novel Die kleine Blanchefleur
- Premiere: 23 November 1911; Vienna Volksoper

Der Kuhreigen (German: [deːɐ̯ ˈkuːˌʁaɪɡn̩]; "The Cow Round") is an opera or musical play in three acts by the Austrian composer Wilhelm Kienzl. The libretto, by Richard Batka, is after Rudolf Hans Bartsch's novel Die kleine Blanchefleur. It was first performed at the Vienna Volksoper on 23 November 1911. The work has also been performed in a French-language translation under the title Le Ranz des Vaches; including its staging by the Chicago Grand Opera Company in 1913 with Martha Winternitz-Dorda as Blanchefleur and Charles Dalmorès as Primus Thaller. The Chicago company performed this work on tour to the Metropolitan Opera House in New York in February of that year but with a cast change of Helen Stanley as Blachefleur.

== Roles ==
Role	Voice type	Premiere Cast, 23 November 1911 Conductor: Robert Heger
Blanchefleur	soprano	Maria Jeritza
Primus Thaller	tenor	Rudolf Ritter
Brayole	tenor	Manwald
Cleo	mezzo-soprano	Martinowska
Dursel	bass	Nicolaus Zeč
Kanzler	bass	Resti
The King	bass	Günther
Marquis de Chézy	bass	Walden
Marquis Massimelle	bass	Markowsky

== Synopsis ==
Set in revolutionary France, this is the love story of the Swiss Sergeant Primus Thaller, condemned for singing the banned Swiss 'Kuhreigen' folksong, and Blanchefleur, wife of the Marquis Massimelle, who saves him and then herself becomes a victim of the revolution.

== Recordings ==
March 27, 1952, Conductor: Wilhelm Loibner; Walter Berry, Otto Wiener, Anny Felbermayer, Leo Heppe, Dagmar Hermann, Fritz Sperlbauer, Erich Kaufmann, Josef Knapp, and Ruthilde Boesch. Tonkünstlerchor und Großes Orchester der RAVAG, Wien, 1951. MYTO Historical Line 2CD 00275

Richard Tauber, who was a favorite of the composer, recorded the two main tenor arias twice for Odeon Records, firstly in April 1920 by the acoustic process, and again in September 1931 electrically. Both are now on CD.

== Sources ==
- Casaglia, Gherardo (2005). "Der Kuhreigen". L'Almanacco di Gherardo Casaglia (in Italian).
- Melitz: Führer durch die Opern” (Berlin 1920), translated by Andreas Praefcke
