= Martha Winternitz-Dorda =

Martha Dorda, also known by her married name Martha Winternitz-Dorda, (28 March 1880 – 9 December 1958, Hamburg) was an Austrian soprano and voice teacher. She was married to the conductor and composer Arnold Winternitz (1874-1927). Her voice is preserved on recordings made for Pathé Records and Parlophone.

== Life and career ==
Martha Dorda was born in Vienna, Austria on 28 March 1880. She made her debut at the Volkstheater, Vienna in 1899 where she worked as comprimario soprano through 1901. In 1901-1902 she was committed to the opera house in Opava, and in 1902-1903 she was a resident artist at the Linz State Theatre. She concurrently performed at the Graz Opera from 1901-1906.

Winternitz-Dorda was a resident soprano at Raimund Theater in Vienna from 1908 through 1910. With pianist Etta Werndorf she gave the first performance of Arnold Schoenberg's song cycle The Book of the Hanging Gardens on 14 January 1910 at a concert in Vienna. On 12 September 1910 she performed as a soloist in the world premiere of Gustav Mahler's Symphony No. 8 with the Munich Philharmonic. She was a leading prima donna in the dramatic soprano repertoire at the Hamburg State Opera (HSO) from 1910-1913. During that period she also appeared as a guest artist with the Vienna State Opera (1910), Badisches Staatstheater Karlsruhe (1912), the Mannheim National Theatre (1912), and the Leipzig Opera (1912). On 23 February 1913 she performed the role of Tove in the premiere of Schoenberg's Gurre-Lieder at the Musikverein, and later repeated that part in Leipzig in 1914.

She came to the United States after this where she was a leading soprano with the Chicago Grand Opera Company (CGOC) in 1913-1914. With the CGOC she starred as Blanchefleur in the United States premiere of Wilhelm Kienzl's Der Kuhreigen. After this she worked as a guest performer in opera houses and on the concert stage until retiring from performance in 1933 after giving a farewell performance as the Marschallin in Der Rosenkavalier. In 1918 she starred in the premiere of her husband's opera Meister Grobian at the HSO. After Winternitz's death in 1927 she married the pianist Richard Goldschmied.

Winternitz-Dorda work as a voice teacher Hamburg, Germany during the last 25 years of her life. She died in Hamburg on 9 December 1958.
