= Richard Stöhr =

Austrian composer (1874–1967)

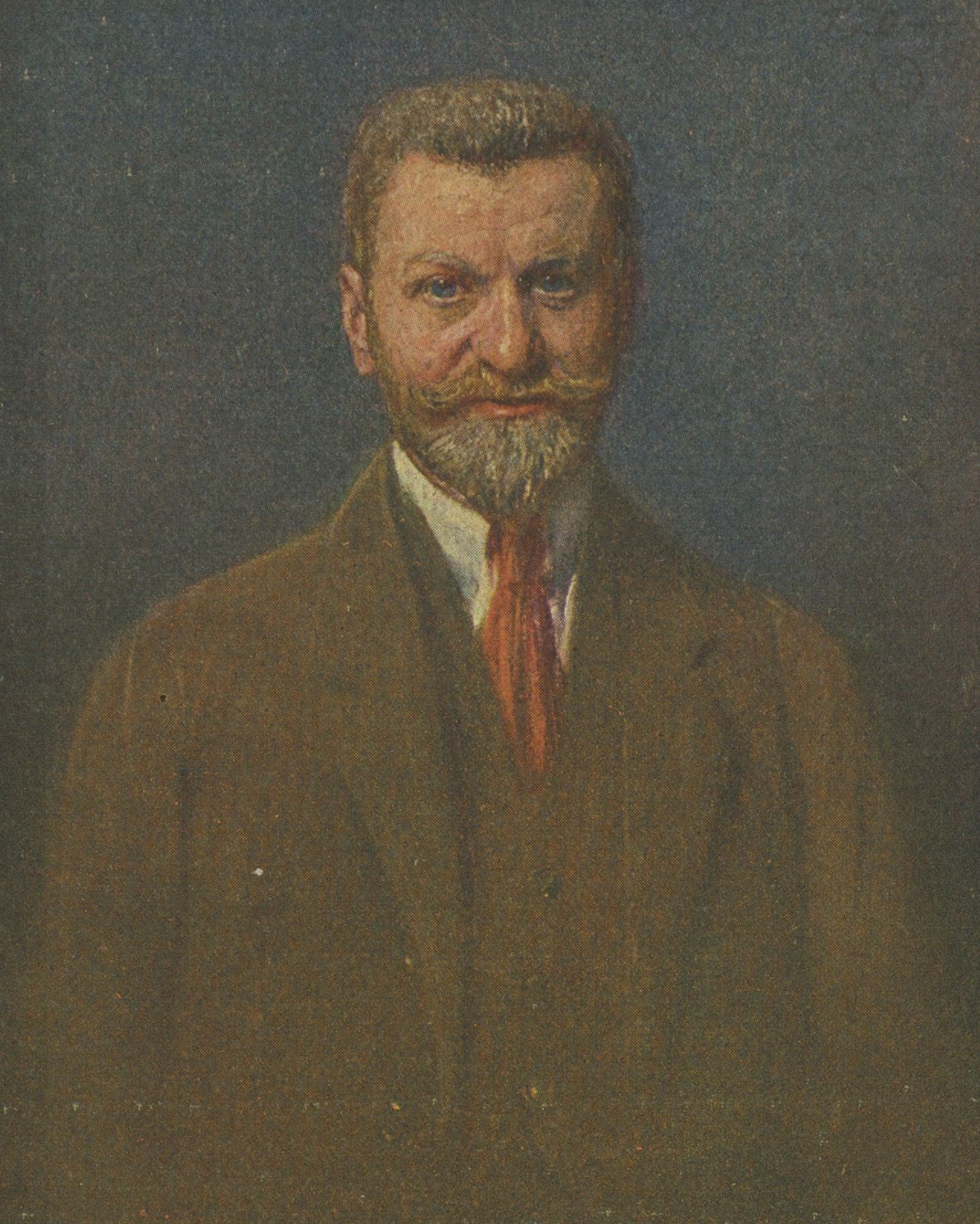
- Painting of Stöhr by Tom von Dreger

Background information
- Also known as: Richard Franz Stöhr; Richard Stoehr
- Born: Richard Franz Stern; 11 June 1874; Vienna, Austria-Hungary
- Died: 11 December 1967 (aged 93) Montpelier, Vermont, U.S.
- Education: Vienna Academy of Music (PhD)
- Occupations: Composer; educator

Richard Franz Stöhr (né Stern; 11 June 1874 – 11 December 1967) was an Austrian composer and music educator.

In 1900 Stöhr studied composition with Robert Fuchs at the Vienna Conservatory working as a répétiteur and choral instructor. Between 1903 and 1938, Stöhr taught music theory, including harmony, counterpoint, and form at the conservatory. He became a professor at the same institution in 1915. His students there included prominent conductors, composers, and performers such as Herbert von Karajan, Rudolf Serkin, Erich Leinsdorf, and Samuel Barber, among others.

During the Anschluss of Austria in 1938, he was dismissed from the Vienna Conservatory due to his Jewish heritage. He went to the United States the following year and began teaching at the Curtis Institute of Music in Philadelphia. His students there included Leonard Bernstein and Eugene Bossart. From 1941 to 1950, he taught at Saint Michael's College in Colchester, Vermont, where he remained as Professor Emeritus until 1960. He died in Montpelier on 11 December 1967 at the age of 93.

== Early life and education ==
Stöhr was born as Richard Stern in Vienna in 1874 to Jewish parents who had emigrated from Hungary. His father, Samuel Stern, was a professor of medicine at the University of Vienna. His mother, Mathilde, was a member of the Porges family; her brother—Heinrich Porges—was a close associate of Richard Wagner. Stöhr had a sister named Hedwig (date of birth unknown), who died in Modliborzyce while in Nazi custody on January 2, 1942.

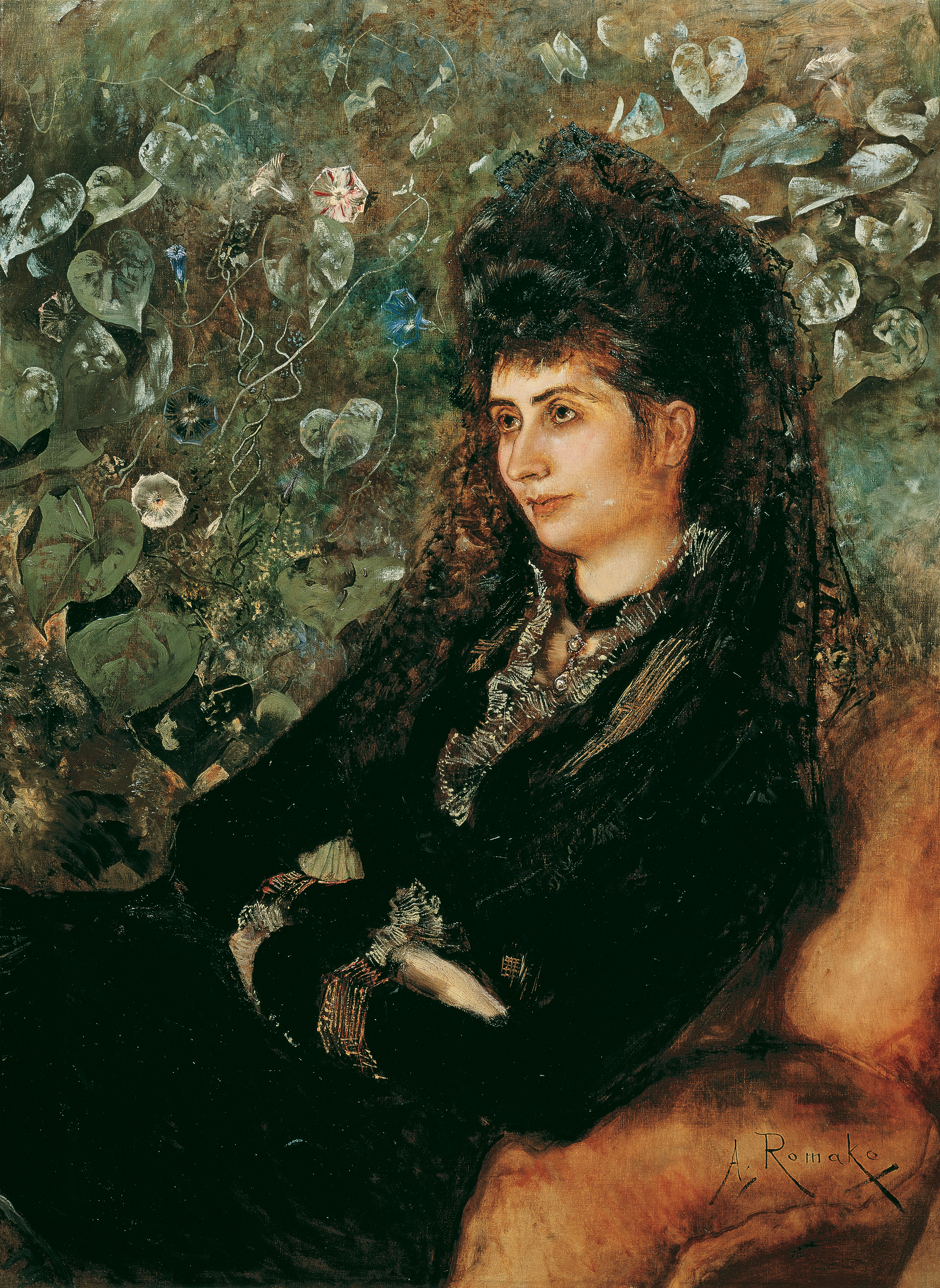
Portrait of Richard's mother, Mathilde Porges Stern by Anton Romako

Stöhr began composing at the age of six, and started a diary at the age of 15. He earned a degree in medicine in 1898, but later entered the Vienna Academy of Music to study composition with Robert Fuchs. During this time, he changed his surname from Stern to Stöhr and converted to Christianity.

In a diary entry from 1898, Stöhr described his decision to pursue music professionally as a decisive turning point, noting both his commitment to composition and his formal adoption of the surname “Stöhr.”

Heinrich Porges encouraged Stöhr’s musical development and helped introduce him to influential figures in Viennese musical circles.

He earned a PhD in music in 1903.

== Career ==
After completing his studies, Stöhr worked at the Academy as a rehearsal pianist and choir director. He soon began teaching music theory, composition, and music history, as well as instructing in chamber music. In a diary entry from 1909, Stöhr noted the positive reception of his Harmonielehre, including strong critical reviews and the rapid sale of its first edition, as well as the increasing frequency of performances of his compositions.

When Fuchs retired in 1911–1912, Stöhr took over his most advanced courses and became a professor of music theory at the Academy in 1915. In the same year, he was conscripted into the Austrian army as a physician, serving at a hospital in the suburbs of Vienna while continuing to reside at his home and teach at the Academy.

Stöhr married his first wife in 1904; the marriage ended after three years. In 1909, he met Marie (“Mitzi”), with whom he lived until they were able to marry in 1923. Their children, Richard and Hedwig (“Hedi”), were born in the 1920s.

During the 1920s, Stöhr became widely recognized as a music theorist and published several treatises and textbooks on counterpoint and musical form. He also performed regularly as a pianist, and nearly all of his compositions were published. Before his exile, his works were performed frequently across Europe.

By around 1930, the economic difficulties and rise of antisemitism in Austria prompted Stöhr to begin studying English, which was probably in preparation for emigration. In 1954, Austrian journalist Hedy Kempny, a close friend of Arthur Schnitzler, wrote about her former teacher, Stöhr:

"Stöhr resided in a traditional 'old Vienna' home, distinguished by a large music room housing two pianos. The walls were adorned with photographs of composers and notable acquaintances from various countries, along with snapshots of students and friends. Every two weeks, he hosted an informal 'open house,' welcoming all who wished to attend. Guests typically gathered around seven o’clock, often accompanied by friends eager to meet him. On occasion, Stöhr would arrive later to find the apartment filled with thirty or more visitors. These gatherings frequently attracted distinguished guests such as Bruno Walter, Felix Weingartner, and Erich Wolfgang Korngold, and sometimes featured performances of Stöhr’s Lieder by opera singers."

=== Nazi takeover and dismissal ===
After German troops marched into Austria as part of the Anschluss in March 1938, an SS intelligence unit was housed in the state academy. Over the coming days, the interim director suspended eleven teachers who, under the Nuremberg Laws, were ineligible to swear allegiance to Adolf Hitler due to their Jewish ancestry. A list dated May 1938 contains the names of 23 teachers who were no longer to be employed on the grounds of their "race". Stöhr was among those affected. He was able to emigrate along with several other teachers; the fate of the other teachers is unknown.

=== Emigration to the USA ===
In February 1939, Stöhr emigrated to the United States. From this time until his death, he used the alternate spelling of his name: Stoehr. He was initially hired as a music librarian by the Curtis Institute of Music in Philadelphia, later teaching music theory and composition courses, with Leonard Bernstein among his students. Stöhr was also hired to translate a part of the Burrell Collection of the Letters of Richard Wagner. Curtis downsized its faculty in 1941 after the United States entered World War II, and Stöhr's position was eliminated. He then found another position at Saint Michael's College in Colchester, Vermont, where he taught German language and music courses. At the college, Stöhr's salary was supplemented by the assistance from the Oberlander Trust and the Emergency Committee in Aid of Displaced Foreign Scholars, a program of the Institute of International Education (IIE). Stöhr continued to compose prolifically during his years in the US, in all major classical genres except opera, but none of his numerous compositions from this period were published.

== Death and legacy ==
Stöhr died in December 1967 at the age of 93 in Montpelier and was buried in Merrill Cemetery in Colchester.

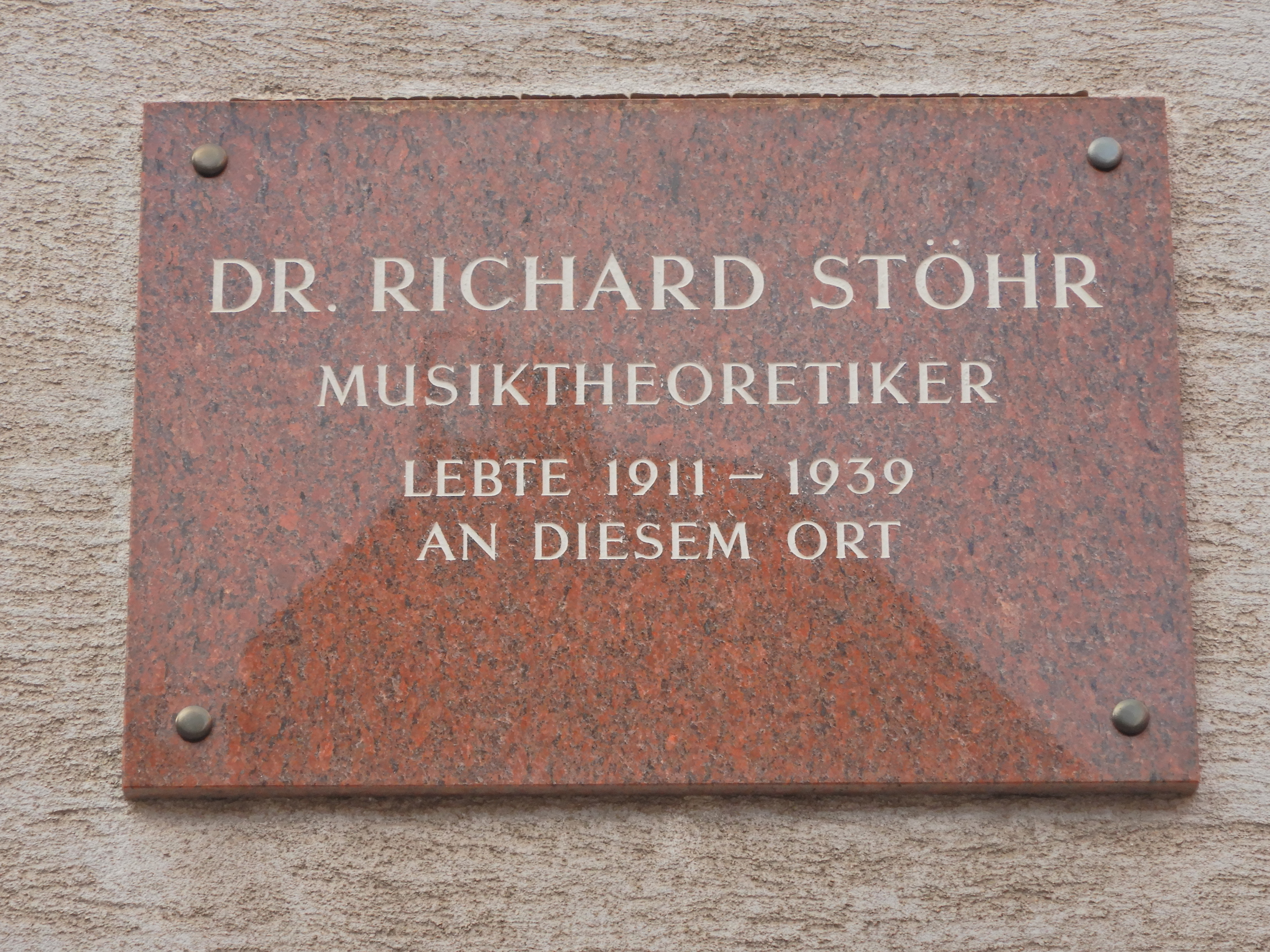
Commemorative plaque for Richard Stöhr in Vienna

Stöhr's diary, spanning more than six decades, is stored in the Austrian National Library, along with his published compositions. Copies of most of his published compositions, as well as manuscripts of his post-emigration compositions, are available at the Saint Michael's College Archive. His work encompasses choral music, chamber music, seven symphonies, symphonic poems, two operas, an oratorio, and two cantatas.

While Stöhr's contemporaries at the Second Viennese School, such as Arnold Schoenberg, were creating new 20th-century compositional styles, Stöhr's compositions remained relatively conservative in style, which won the approval of contemporary critics and led to commercial success and frequent performances of Stöhr's compositions.

In 2003, the City of Vienna dedicated a plaque at the site of his former residence at Karolinengasse 14.

== Recordings ==
In 2010, the Austrian National Radio (ORF) issued a recording (CD 3093) featuring Stöhr’s String Quartet in D minor, Op. 22 (1903), along with other works. His Flute Sonata was recorded by David Shostac on the album Masterpieces Rediscovered.

The most extensive foray into Stöhr's music has been undertaken by the British music label Toccata Classics, which has released four CDs with chamber works and three with orchestral repertoire. Included are the first two symphonies, a piano concerto, two suites for orchestra, symphonic poems, violin sonatas, cello sonatas, and a string quartet.

== Selected bibliography ==
- 1906 — Praktischer Leitfaden der Harmonielehre. Vienna: Universal Edition; Japanese Edition, 1954, Tokyo.
- 1911 — Formenlehre der Musik. Leipzig: Kistner und Siegel.
- 1911 — Praktischer Leitfaden des Kontrapunktes. Hamburg: Benjamin.
- 1915 — Praktische Modulationslehre. Leipzig: Kistner und Siegel.
- 1917 — Anhang zu der praktischen Modulationslehre. Leipzig: Kistner und Siegel.
- 1921 — "Erfahrungen im Theorieunterricht", Musikpädagogische Zeitschrift (Wien) Xl/6.
- 1931 — Fragen und Aufgaben zur Harmonielehre. Vienna: Universal Edition.
- 1950 — Richard Wagner, Letters of Richard Wagner. The Burrell Collection. New York: The Macmillan Company. (translation)
- 1954 — Über den Ursprung der modernen Musik (Japanese), Tokyo.

=== About Richard Stöhr ===
- 1965 — Hans Sittner, Richard Stöhr. Mensch/Musiker/Lehrer. Vienna: Doblinger.

== Musical compositions ==
The following is a list of Stöhr’s musical compositions, organized by genre. In general, opus numbers up to 70 were assigned by his European publishers, and correspond to works printed and distributed in the sheet music trade in Europe prior to 1938. Opus numbers 71 and higher were assigned by Stöhr himself, denoting completed but unpublished compositions written in the United States after 1938. The list is adapted from Appendix 4 of Dr. Hans Sittner’s biography of Stöhr.

=== Operas ===
- Ilse, Romantic opera in three acts, Op. 31 (Text by Richard Batka) (Universal Edition, Wien)
- Die Gürtelspanner, in three acts, Op. 59 (Text by Beatrice Dovsky) (Ms)

=== Oratorios ===
- Der verlorene Sohn, Biblical oratorio in four parts (Text by Viktoria Schotteck), Op. 14 (Ms)
- Notturno sinfonico, Cantata for choir, solos, and orchestra, Op. 67 (Ms)
- Christmas Cantata for mixed chorus, soli, orchestra, and organ on a text by Longfellow Higgins, Op. 84 (Ms)

=== Symphonies ===
- Symphony No. 1 in A minor, Op. 18 (1909)
  1. Andante maestoso
  2. Scherzo
  3. Andante religioso
  4. Finale. Vivacissimo
- Symphony No. 2 in D minor, Op. 81 (1942; Ms)
  1. Allegro energico
  2. Andante
  3. Vivace
  4. Finale. Allegro con fuoco
- Symphony No. 3 in C, Op. 93 (1943; Ms)
  1. Molto moderato
  2. Andante con moto
  3. Allegro con brio
  4. Finale. Un poco grave — Allegro con brio
- Symphony No. 4, An Artist's Life!, Op. 101 (1944; Ms)
- Symphony No. 5 in E minor, Op. 106 (1944; Ms)
- Symphony No. 6 in B♭, Op. 129 (1949; Ms)
- Symphony No. 7 in C minor, Op. 136 (1952; Ms)

=== Orchestral works ===
- Serenade in C minor, Op. 7 (Ms)
- Suite for String Orchestra in C major, Op. 8 (Leuckardt, Leipzig)
- Chamber Symphony in F major, Op. 32
- Romantische Suite for Orchestra in D, Op. 37 (Ms)
- Symphonic Poem Vom Leben, after Schiller, Op. 51 (Ms)
- Vermont Suite for Orchestra, Op. 72 (Ms)
- Overture for violin, winds, and percussion, per aspera ad astra, Op. 79a (Ms)
- Two Roads to Victory* (Through Arms - Through Love), Op. 79b (Ms)
- Second Suite for String Orchestra, Op. 120 (Ms)
- Scherzo in F major for Orchestra, WoO (Ms)

=== Concertante works ===
- Symphonic Fantasy for organ and Orchestra in F-Moll, Op. 29 (KS)
- Cornet Concerto in B♭ minor, Op. 40 (Oertel, Hannover)
  1. Allegro energico
  2. Andante con moto
  3. Finale. Allegro vivace
- Concert Fantasy for Violin and Orchestra in D minor, Op. 50 (Kistner und Siegel, Leipzig)
- Concerto in the Old Style for percussion, piano, and strings in G minor, Op. 68
  1. Intrata
  2. Sarabande & Scherzo
  3. Burleske & Aria
  4. Introduction & Finale

=== Choral works ===
- Vier Gesänge für dreistimmigen Frauenchor mit Klavier, Op. 5 (Kistner und Siegel, Leipzig)
- Zwei Männerchöre mit Orchester, Op. 10 (Kistner und Siegel, Leipzig)
- Drei gemischte Chöre für Orchester, Op. 12
  1. Waldnacht(Kistner und Siegel, Leipzig)
  2. Weihnachtsmärchen (Leuckardt, Leipzig)
  3. Die Nacht (Ms)
- Drei Quartette für Frauenstimmen a cappella (Ms)
- Zwei dreistimmige Frauenchöre (Callwey Verlag, Munich)
- Sechs Männerchöre, a cappella, Op. 25 (Kistner und Siegel, Leipzig)
- Zwei Männerchöre mit Orchester, Op. 30 (Kistner und Siegel, Leipzig)
- Drei gemischte Chöre mit Orchester, Op. 36 (Kistner und Siegel, Leipzig)
- Der Landsknecht' Abendritt, Op. 38 (Männerchor, Orgel und kl. Trommel) (Kistner und Siegel, Leipzig)
- Sechs Frauenchöre mit Klavier, Op. 39 (Kistner und Siegel, Leipzig)
- Erntefestlied (mit Orchester), Op. 42 (Kistner und Siegel, Leipzig)
- Das Klostergrab (mit Orgel), Op. 44 (Ms)
- Johannisfeier (mit Orgel und Orchester), Op. 45 (Ms)
- Zwei Frauenchöre mit Orchester, Op. 57 (Kistner und Siegel, Leipzig)
- Zwei zweistimmige Frauenchöre mit Klavier und Laute, resp. Glockenspiele, Op. 58 (Kistner und Siegel, Leipzig)
- Allerseelen (mit Orchester oder Klavier), Op. 66 (Ms)
- Fünf Frauenchöre mit Klavier (englisch), Op. 78 (1942; Ms)
- Four mixed choruses with piano, Op. 83 (1942; Ms)
- Suite for four recorders, spinetto, and chorus of female voices, Op. 111a (1944; Ms)
- Den Lichtspendern. Vierstimmiger Frauenchor (1948; Ms)
- Winter, Vierstimmiger Frauenchor (1949; Ms)
- Ballad of St. Michael's, male chorus & piano, trumpet, drums (Ms)
- A Grace for Christmas, for mixed chorus and piano (Text by J.F. Cooke; 1950)

=== Violin sonatas ===
- Violin Sonata No. 1 in C, Op. 27 (1911; Universal Edition, Wien)
- Violin Sonata No. 2, Op. 61 (1921; Huni, Zurich)
- Violin Sonata No. 3 in E minor, Op. 73 (1941; Ms)
- Violin Sonata No. 4 in D minor, Op. 83 (1942; Ms)
- Violin Sonata No. 5 in B, Op. 95 (1943; Ms)
- Violin Sonata No. 6 in G minor, Quasi fantasia, Op. 103 (Ms)
- Violin Sonata No. 7 in D, Op. 107 (Ms)
- Violin Sonata No. 8 in C, Op. 115 (Ms)
- Violin Sonata No. 9 in D, Op. 118 (Ms)
- Violin Sonata No. 10 in C, Op. 122 (Ms)
- Violin Sonata No. 11 in B minor, Op. 125 (Ms)
- Violin Sonata No. 12 in D minor, Op. 130 (1949; Ms)
- Violin Sonata No. 13 in A minor, Op. 131 (Ms)
- Violin Sonata No. 14 in B minor, Op. 134a (Ms)
- Violin Sonata No. 15 in E♭, Op. 134b (Ms)

=== Chamber music ===
- Oktett für Bläser- und Streichinstrumente, Op. 2 (Ms)
- Klavierquintett G-Moll, Op. 6 (Ms)
- Trio Es-Dur für Klavier, Violin und Violoncello, Op. 16 (Kistner und Siegel, Leipzig)
- Fantasiestücke (Suite für Violoncello und Klavier, Op. 17 (Kistner und Siegel, Leipzig)
- Streichquartett D-Moll, Op. 22 (Universal Edition, Wien)
- Streichquartett G-Dur (Ms)
- Klavierquintett G-Moll (Ms)
- Klavierquintett C-Moll, Op. 43
- Chamber Symphony in F, Op. 32 for oboe, clarinet, horn, bassoon, and harp (Kahnt, Leipzig)
  1. Allegro
  2. Andante quasi marcia
  3. Allegro
  4. Un poco grave; Allegro
- Violoncellosonate A-Moll, Op. 49 (Doblinger, Vienna)
- Suite für Flöte und Streichquartett, Op. 52 (Strache, Wien)
- Trio für 2 Fagotte und Klavier, Op. 53 (Strache, Wien)
- Flute Sonata, Op. 61 (Ortel, Hannover)
- Klavierquartett D-Moll, Op. 63 (Kistner und Siegel, Leipzig)
- "Pocone Overture" mit der amerikanischen Hymne für Klavierquintett D-Moll (Ms)
- Klavierquartett, Op. 75 (1941; Ms)
- Suite für Flöte, Geige Violoncello und Klavier, G-Moll, Op. 76 (1941; Ms)
- Klaviertrio C-Dur (Violine, Violoncello, Klavier), Op. 77 (1942; Ms)
- Spring Suite F-Dur, Op. 80 (2 Flutes, Violin & Piano; Ms)
- String Quartet Es-Dur, Op. 86 (1942; Ms)
- Quintet for four recorders and piano, Op. 87 (1942; Ms)
- Three Waltzes for violin and piano, Op. 88 (1942; Ms)
- 10 Miniatures for violin and piano, Op. 89 (1943; Ms)
- Six sketches for flute and piano, Op. 90 (1943; Ms)
- String Quartet A minor, Op. 92 (1943; Ms)
- Piano-Quintet G minor, Op. 94 (Ms)
- Trio for piano, violin, and violoncello, Op. 97 (1943; Ms)
- Trio for Violin, Violoncello and Piano, Op. 100 (Ms)
- Suite for organ and violin, Op 102 (1944; Ms)
- Piano-Quintet D minor, Op. 111b (1945; Ms)
- String Quartet E minor, Op. 114 (Ms)
- Suite for violin and piano, G major, Op. 117a (1946; Ms)
- Suite for violin and piano A major, Op. 117b (1946; Ms)
- Ten Intermezzi for String Quartet, Op. 124 (1948; Ms)
- Three pictures of Vienna for piano and violin, Op. 126a (Ms)
- Ballet-Suite for piano and violin, C major, Op. 126b (1946; Ms)
- Trio in D minor, Op. 127 (1948; Ms)
- Fantasy for trumpet and piano, composed for Fr. Lyons (1949; Ms)
- No. Scherzo G minor for trumpet and piano, 1949; Ms)
- Sextet for violin, clarinet, French horn, violoncello, two pianos, Op. 133 (1950; Ms)

=== Piano ===
- (Two Hand Piano Pieces)
- Variationen und Fuge Des-Dur über ein Originalthema, Op. 1 (Schlesinger, Berlin)
- Sechs Stimmungsbilder, Op. 4 (Kahnt, Leipzig)
- Variationen in Es-Moll und F-Dur für Klavier, Op. 9 (Ms)
- Fünf Klavierstücke, Op. 23 (Universal Edition, Wien)
- Sechs Konzert-Etuden, Op. 26 (Siegel (Linnemann), Leipzig)
- Bilder aus Natur und Leben (Sechs Klavierstücke), Op. 41 (Doblinger, Vienna)
- Märchen, Stimmungsbild für Klavier (Pabst, Leipzig.)
- Von den Mädchen (12 ernste und heitere Charakterskizzen für Klavier), Op. 64 (Universal Edition, Wien)
- Drei Klavierstücke, Op. 70 (1940, Ms)
- Letzte Blüten (12 Klavierstücke), Op. 71 (1941, Ms)
- Waltzes in Schubert style (1942, Ms)
- Vier Klavierstücke, Op. 85 (1942, Ms)
- Zwölf Stücke für Klaviersolo, Op. 98 (1944, Ms)
- Zwölf Stücke für Klaviersolo, Op. 95 (1944, Ms)
- Ballet-Suite for piano, Op. 112 (Ms)
- Piano Sonata B minor, Op. 113a (Ms)
- Piano Sonata A major, Op. 113b (Ms)
- Piano Sonata C minor, Op. 113c (Ms)
- Suite for Piano D minor, Op. 116a (Ms)
- Suite for Piano B minor, Op. 116b (Ms)
- Suite for Piano C minor, Op. 116c (1946, Ms)
- Anticipation. (Zu Hedy's 20. Geburtstag.) (1947, Ms)
- 12 Klavierstücke, Op. 121 (1948, Ms)
- 15 Klavierstücke, Op. 128 (1949, Ms)
- Piano Sonata in A major, Op. 132a (Ms)
- Piano Suite in E minor, Op. 132b (Ms)

=== Four-hand piano pieces ===
- Variationen Es-Moll über ein Thema von L. Pahlen und F-Dur über ein Thema von M. von Pidoll, Op. 9 (Ms)
- Rondo H-Dur (Ms)
- Suite for Piano, D minor, Op. 135 (For Barbara Beal), 1950 (Ms)
- Vier Stücke, Op. 74, Op. 99 & 108 (Ms)
  1. Divertimento, Fünf Sätze (Ms)
  2. Divertimento D-Dur, Vier Sätze (Ms)
- Millington-Suite in E♭, Op. 123 (Ms)

=== Piano and harmonium ===
- Fünf Intermezzi, Op. 35 (Leuckardt, Leipzig)

=== Organ ===
- 33 Orgel-Sonate D-Moll (Böhm & Sohn, Augsburg)
- 24 Kurze Choralvorspiele (Ms)

=== Lieder ===
- Vier Lieder (4), Op. 3 KS-(Robitschek, Wien)
- Fünf Lieder (5), Op. 11 KS-(Robitschek, Wien)
- Vier Lieder (4), Op. 13 (KS-(Robitschek, Wien)
- Sieben Lieder (7), Op. 14 KS-(Robitschek, Wien)
- Sieben Lieder (7), Op. 15 KS-(Robitschek, Wien)
- Vier Lieder (4), Op. 19 KS-(Robitschek, Wien)
- Fünf Lieder nach Goethe, Op. 20 (KS-(Robitschek, Wien)
- Drei Lieder mit obbligato Violoncello (3), Op. 21 (Schuberthaus, Wien)
- Fünf Lieder (5), Op. 28 (Universal Edition, Wien)
- Vier Lieder nach Natalie von Oldenburg, Op. 47 (Kistner und Siegel, Leipzig)
- Fünf Lieder (5), Op. 48 (Universal Edition, Wien)
- Fünf Lieder (5), Op. 54 (Kistner und Siegel, Leipzig)
- Zehn Lieder (10), Op. 55 (Kistner und Siegel, Leipzig)
- Drei Lieder nach H. Dietrolf, Op. 56 (Kistner und Siegel, Leipzig)
- Acht Lieder (8)? (Kistner und Siegel, Leipzig)
- Zwölf Lieder (12), Op. 60 (Strache, Wien)
- Vier Lieder nach Walter Pfund mit obbligato Geige, Op. 65 (Kistner und Siegel, Leipzig)
- Brautlied für eine Singstimme, Orgel und Harfe (Kistner und Siegel, Leipzig)
- Zwölf Lieder (12), Op. 91 (Ms)
- Zehn Lieder (10), Op. 96 (Ms)
- Zehn Lieder (10), Op. 104a (Ms)
- Sechs Lieder nach Janie Rhyne, Op. 104b (Ms)
- Sechs Lieder (6), Op. 109 (Ms)
- Zwölf Lieder (12), Op. 110 (Ms)
- Dreizehn (13) Gesänge österreichischer Dichter, Op. 119 (Ms)
- Bergwiese in Vermont nach Raab (Ms)
- Voice of Lake Champlain, song by Charles Ballantyne (Ms)

=== Duets ===
- 24 Sechs Duette für Sopran und Alt (Kistner und Siegel, Leipzig)
- 34 Sechs Duette für Sopran und Tenor (Kahnt, Leipzig.)
