= Weichet nur, betrübte Schatten, BWV 202 =

Secular cantata by Johann Sebastian Bach

Weichet nur, betrübte Schatten
- BWV 202
- Secular cantata by J. S. Bach
- Vocal: soprano
- Instrumental: oboe, violins, viola, continuo

Weichet nur, betrübte Schatten (Dissipate, you troublesome shadows), BWV 202, (Note: "BWV" is Bach-Werke-Verzeichnis, a thematic catalogue of Bach's works.) is a secular cantata by Johann Sebastian Bach. It was likely composed for a wedding, but scholars disagree on the dating which could be as early as Bach's tenure in Weimar, around 1714, while it has traditionally been connected to his wedding to Anna Magdalena on 3 December 1721 in Köthen. It is one of Bach's frequently recorded cantatas. The aria "Sich üben im Lieben" ("To practice sweet courtship, to joyously cuddle" or "To cultivate love") is often performed as a concert piece.

== History and text ==
The cantata music survives only in a copy from the 1730s, which features a surprising style used by Bach only until around 1714. The librettist is not known with certainty, but Harald Streck suspects Salomon Franck, the Weimar court poet. Joshua Rifkin also argues for a Weimar date, rather than the more commonly assigned Köthen period, based on stylistic elements such as the short recitatives ending arioso, the slow–fast-slow tempo of the first aria, which Bach used only rarely after 1714, and the specific relation of voice and obbligato oboe in the seventh movement, which rarely occurs after 1715. More traditionally, the composition was linked to Bach's time in Köthen from 1718, and the occasion a wedding, possibly his own to Anna Magdalena in December 1721.

The text relates beginning love to the arrival of spring after winter, mentioning shooting flowers in the first two movements, the sun climbing higher in the third movement, Cupid searching for "prey" in the following two movements, finally a bridal couple and good wishes for them. The tone is humorous and jesting, which suggests a civil wedding.

The aria "Sich üben im Lieben" ("To practice sweet courtship, to joyously cuddle" or "To cultivate love") is frequently performed as a concert piece.

The cantata was published in 1862 as No. 2 in volume 11 of the Bach-Gesellschaft Ausgabe (BGA), edited by Wilhelm Rust. The New Bach Edition (Neue Bach-Ausgabe, NBA) published the score in 1969, edited by Werner Neumann, in volume 40, Hochzeitskantaten und Weltliche Kantaten verschiedener Bestimmung (wedding cantatas and secular cantatas for different occasions).

== Scoring and structure ==
Bach structured the work in 9 movements, alternating arias with varied texture and recitative. He scored it for a solo soprano voice (S), and a Baroque instrumental ensemble of oboe (Ob), violins (Vl), viola (Va), and basso continuo (Bc).

In the following table of the movements, the scoring follows the Neue Bach-Ausgabe. The keys and time signatures are taken from Alfred Dürr, using the symbol for common time (4/4). The continuo, playing throughout, is not shown.

Movements of Weichet nur, betrübte Schatten, BWV 202
No.	Title	Type	Vocal	Winds	Strings	Key	Time
1	Weichet nur, betrübte Schatten	Aria	S	Ob	2Vl Va	G Major	common time
2	Die Welt wird wieder neu	Recitative	S			C Major	common time
3	Phoebus eilt mit schnellen Pferden	Aria	S			C Major	12/8
4	Drum sucht auch Amor sein Vergnügen	Recitative	S				common time
5	Wenn die Frühlingslüfte streichen	Aria	S		Vl solo	E minor	common time
6	Und dieses ist das Glücke	Recitative	S				common time
7	Sich üben im Lieben	Aria	S	Ob		D major	3/8
8	So sei das Band der keuschen Liebe	Recitative	S			G major	common time
9	Sehet in Zufriedenheit	Aria	S	Ob	2Vl Va	G major	cut time

== Music ==
The first aria, "Weichet nur, betrübte Schatten" (Dissipate, you troublesome shadows), is accompanied by all instruments. The strings play a repetitious motif illustrating the vanishing of winter, while the oboe leads with an expanded melody to the entry of the voice, then playing in duet with it. The opening section is marked Adagio, while the middle section, about Flora's pleasures, of a da capo form is marked Andante. It has been described as painting "a sensuous picture of spring's lazy pleasures as the singer invites the depressing shades of winter to depart", a change "from shadow to sunlight, from winter's cold to spring's bursting flowers".

A recitative, "Die Welt wird wieder neu" (The world becomes new again), leads to the second aria, "Phoebus eilt mit schnellen Pferden" (Phoebus hastes with rapid horses) which is accompanied only by the continuo. The trotting of the horse mentioned in the text is illustrated in the continuo. The movement has been described as a "vividly melismatic depiction of warm breezes hurrying through the reborn world". The aria shows similarity to the last movement of Bach's Violin Sonata in G major, BWV 1019.

A recitative, "Drum sucht auch Amor sein Vergnügen" (Therefore Love himself seeks his pleasure), leads to the third aria, "Wenn die Frühlingslüfte streichen" (When the springtime breezes caress), with a solo violin, in an elegiac mood.

The recitative "Und dieses ist das Glücke" (And this is good fortune) prepares the aria "Sich üben im Lieben, in Scherzen sich herzen" (To cultivate love, to cuddle in playful tenderness) with an obbligato oboe. The melody of the dance-like music in a triple metre alludes to folk music.

A recitative, "So sei das Band der keuschen Liebe" (So may the bond of chaste love) leads to the final aria, marked as a Gavotte, again with all instruments, "Sehet in Zufriedenheit tausend helle Wohlfahrtstage" (May you see in contentment a thousand bright happy days).

The cantata develops from highly artificial composition to popular dance writing.

== Recordings ==
The cantata is one of Bach's most recorded cantatas.

- Agnes Giebel, RIAS Kammerorchester, Karl Ristenpart. The RIAS Bach Cantatas Project. Audite, 1951.
- Anny Felbermayer. Orchestra of the Bach Guild, Felix Prohaska. J. S. Bach: Cantata No. 202; Cantata No. 161. Vanguard Classics, 1952.
- Maria Stader, Münchener Bach-Orchester, Karl Richter. J.S. Bach: Kantaten BWV 51 & BWV 202. Archiv Produktion, 1959.
- Elly Ameling, Concertgebouw Orchestra Amsterdam, Eugen Jochum. Centenaire Eugen Jochum 3. Tahra, 1973.
- Barbara Hendricks, Kammerorchester Carl Philipp Emanuel Bach, Peter Schreier. Bach Kantaten. EMI Classics, 1989.
- Elly Ameling, Academy of St Martin-in-the-Fields, Neville Marriner. Bach Cantatas. EMI, 1973.
- Emma Kirkby, Academy of Ancient Music, Christopher Hogwood. Wedding Cantatas. Decca, 1996.
- Dorothee Mields, Amsterdam Baroque Orchestra, Ton Koopman. J. S. Bach: Complete Cantatas Vol. 5. Erato, 1996.
