= Richard Specht =

Austrian lyricist, dramatist, musicologist and writer

Richard Specht (7 December 1870, Vienna – 18 March 1932) was an Austrian lyricist, dramatist, musicologist and writer.

Specht, who had studied music with Ignaz Brüll, Alexander von Zemlinsky, and Franz Schreker, is most well known for his writings on classical music, and in his time was seen as a leading music journalist. He was a great authority on the music of Gustav Mahler, and in later life became a regular acquaintance of his widow, Alma Mahler-Werfel.

He was, amongst other things, a contributor to the Wiener Illustrierten Extrablatts and other Viennese newspapers, as well as a correspondent for the Berlin-based music magazine Die Musik. In 1909, Specht founded the periodical Der Merker, for which he served as editor until July 1914 and again from May 1918 to October 1919 and collaborating with Richard Batka. In 1925, he was appointed to a professorship at the institution that is now the University of Music and Performing Arts, Vienna.

== Works ==
=== Fiction ===
- Gedichte (1893)
- Das Gastmahl des Plato, Drama (1895)
- Pierrot bossu, Drama (1896)
- Mozart, twelve poems (1914)
- Florestan Kestners Erfolg, a story (1929)
- Die Nase des Herrn Valentin Berger, Drama (1929)

=== Academic works ===
- Johann Strauss II (1909)
- Gustav Mahler (1913)
- Das Wiener Operntheater - Fifty years of memories (1919)
- Die Frau ohne Schatten - Introduction to the music (1919)
- Richard Strauss and his work (1921)
- Julius Bittner (1921)
- Emil Nikolaus von Reznicek - A preliminary study (1922)
- Arthur Schnitzler - The poet and his work. A study (1922)
- Wilhelm Furtwängler (1922)
- Franz Werfel (1926)
- Johannes Brahms: Leben und Werk eines deutschen Meisters (1928; English translation by Eric Blom)
- Bildnis Beethovens (1931; English translation, 1933)
- Giacomo Puccini. Das Leben, der Mensch, das Werk (1931; English translation, 1933)
