= Franz Karl Ginzkey =

Austro-Hungarian officer, poet and writer

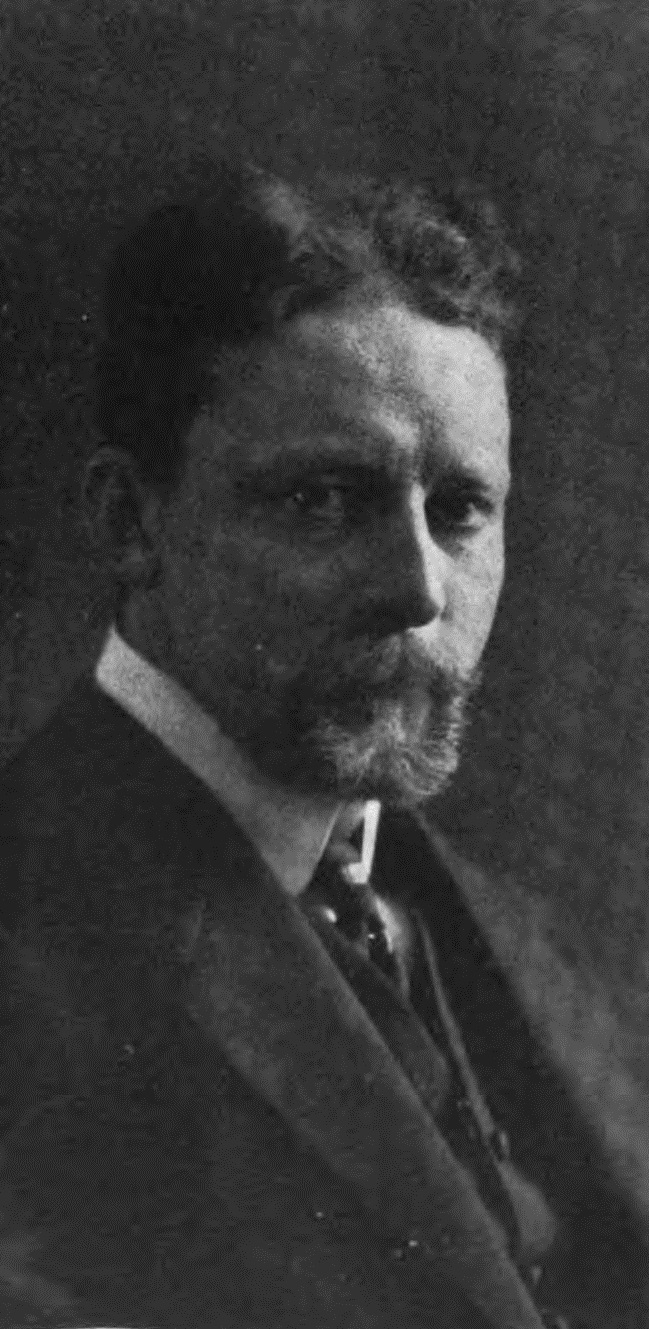
- Born: 8 September 1871 Pola, Austrian Littoral, Austria-Hungary
- Died: 11 April 1963 (aged 91) Vienna, Austria
- Occupation: officer and writer
- Notable works: Hatschi Bratschis Luftballon
- Notable awards: Grand Austrian State Prize for Literature; Austrian Decoration for Science and Art

Franz Karl Ginzkey (8 September 1871, Pola, Austrian Littoral, Austria-Hungary (now Pula, Croatia) – 11 April 1963, Vienna) was an Austro-Hungarian (then Austrian) officer, poet and writer. His arguably most famous book Hatschi Bratschis Luftballon (Hatschi Bratschi's Balloon) captivated generations of children.

== Life ==
Ginzkey, son of a Bohemian German professional officer of the Austrian Navy, was in the imperial army until 1897. During that period he was intermittently also commander of the as barracks used (Rainer-infantry regiment) Fortress Hohensalzburg. From 1897 to 1914 he worked as a cartographer at the Militärgeographischen Institute (Militarygeographic institute) in Vienna, afterwards in the war archive. Since 1920, he was a retired military member and then worked as a freelance writer. At the time of the Austro-Fascism, he was (for the professional group of artists) from 1934 to 1938 Member of the Council of State and after 1938 came to terms with the leaders of National Socialism and even joined the NSDAP. He was friends with Max Mell and Stefan Zweig, and furthermore with Anton Faistauer and Carl Zuckmayer. Moreover, Ginzkey participated in the founding of the Salzburg Festival and for decades was a member of its board of trustees. Since 1944 he lived in Seewalchen at Lake Attersee.

After the end of war Ginzkeys Die Front in Tirol (The front in Tyrol) (Fischer, Berlin, 1916) was blacklisted in the Soviet zone of occupation. [1]

On his 100th birthday a Franz-Karl-Ginzkey monument was erected in Seewalchen at Lake Attersee.

He rests in a grave of honor (German: Ehrengrab) at the Vienna Central Cemetery (Group 32 C, Number 25).

Ginzkey is numbered among the circle of newromantic poets and novelists. One of his literary discoverers was Peter Rosegger. A part of his work shows great connection to Salzburg. This witness the following works:

- Wie ich Herr auf Hohensalzburg ward When I was master at Hohensalzburg
- Altsalzburger Bilder nach 10 Federzeichnungen (gemeinsam mit Ulf Seidl ) Altsalzburger images after 10 pen drawings (together with Ulf Seidl)
- Jakobus und die Frauen (1908) Jacob and the Women
- Der seltsame Soldat (1925) The strange soldier
- Der Heimatsucher (1948) The home searcher
- Das Antlitz Salzburgs (1933) The face of Salzburg
- Salzburg und das Salzkammergut (1934) Salzburg and the Salzkammergut
- Prinz Tunora (1934) Prince Tunora
- Salzburg, sein Volk und seine Trachten (1934) Salzburg, its people and its costumes

In 1968 the square between Alpenstraße (Alpine street) and Adolf-Schemel-Straße (Adolf-Schemel street) in the Salzburg district of Salzburg-Süd (Salzburg-South) (Alpinsiedlung) was named in his honor Ginzkeyplatz.

== Literary works (a selection) ==
- Hatschi Bratschis Luftballon, 1904
- Der von der Vogelweide, 1912
- Der Wiesenzaun. Erzählung, 1913
- Aus der Werkstatt des Lyrikers. Vortrag, 1913
- Den Herren Feinden! Ein Trutz- und Mahnlied, 1914
- Die Front in Tirol, 1916
- Der Gaukler von Bologna, Roman, 1916
- Befreite Stunde. Neue Gedichte, 1917
- Der Doppelspiegel. Betrachtungen und Erzählungen, 1920
- Rositta, 1921
- Der Prinz von Capestrano, 1921
- Von wunderlichen Wegen. 7 Erzählungen, 1922
- Brigitte und Regine, Novelle, 1923
- Die Reise nach Komakuku. Geschichten aus seltsamer Jugend, 1923
- Der Weg zu Oswalda. Erählung, 1924
- Der seltsame Soldat, 1925
- Der Kater Ypsilon. Novellen, 1926
- Der Gott und die Schauspielerin, 1928
- Florians wundersame Reise über die Tapete, 1931
- Drei Frauen. Rosita - Agnete - Oswalda, 1931
- Gespenster auf Hirschberg. Aus der hinterlassenen Handschrift des Majors von Baltram, 1931
- Das verlorene Herz. Ein Märchenspiel, 1931
- Magie des Schicksals. Novelle, 1932
- Das Antlitz Salzburgs, 1933
- Prinz Tunora, Roman, 1934
- Salzburg und das Salzkammergut, 1934
- Salzburg, sein Volk und seine Trachten, 1934
- Liselotte und ihr Ritter oder Warum nicht Romantik?, Roman, 1936
- Sternengast. Neue Gedichte, 1937
- Der selige Brunnen. Eine Raphael Donner-Novelle, 1940
- Meistererzählungen, 1940
- Erschaffung der Eva. Ein epischer Gesang, 1941
- Zeit und Menschen meiner Jugend, 1942
- Taniwani. Ein fröhliches Fischbuch, 1947
- Der Heimatsucher. Ein Leben und eine Sehnsucht, 1948
- Genius Mozart, 1949
- Die Geschichte einer stillen Frau, Roman, 1951
- Der Träumerhansl, 1952
- Altwiener Balladen, 1955
- Der Tanz auf einem Bein. Ein Seitensprung ins Wunderliche, 1956
- Franz Karl Ginzkey. Ausgewählte Werke in vier Bänden, 1960

== Decorations and awards ==
- 1921 Adolf Mejstrik Prize for poetry from the German Schiller Foundation
- 1932 Honorary doctorate from the University of Vienna
- 1941 Ring of Honour of the City of Vienna
- 1954 Literary Prize of the City of Vienna
- 1957 Grand Austrian State Prize for Literature, with Heimito von Doderer
- 1957 Austrian Decoration for Science and Art
- Ring of the city of Salzburg

In 1968, Ginzkeyplatz was named in his honour in the Salzburg district of Salzburg-Süd (Alpensiedlung) between Alpenstrasse und Adolf-Schemel-Strasse. Ginzkey's 100th birthday in 1971 was marked by a Franz-Karl Ginzkey monument on the Attersee Seewalchen.
