= Richard Batka =

Austrian writer, music critic and musicologist

Richard Batka (14 December 1868 – 24 April 1922) was an Austrian musicologist, music critic and librettist. Educated at German Charles-Ferdinand University in his native city of Prague, he began his career as a lecturing academic at that institution in 1900; leaving that post in 1906 to teach on the faculty of the Prague Conservatory. In 1908 he moved to Vienna where he taught courses in the history of opera at the University of Music and Performing Arts Vienna from 1909 to 1914.

Batka worked as an editor, music critic, and writer on music for several publications in Prague and Vienna during his lifetime. The author of numerous popular music-historical and aesthetic writings, he was one of the first German language writers to write on the Music of the Czech Republic. His Aus der Opernwelt: Prager Kritiken und Skizzen (1907, Munich) was the first book in the German language about Czech opera. He also penned his own opera libretti for composers like Eugen d’Albert, Leo Blech, and Richard Stöhr. Also notable among his writings was his three volume discourse on the history of music Allgemeine Geschichte der Musik which was published in Stuttgart between the years 1909 and 1915.

== Life ==
Born in Prague on December 14, 1862, Batka was the nephew of music critic and archivist Ján Nepomuk Batka (1845–1917). He studied the German language and literature with August Sauer and musicology with Guido Adler at German Charles-Ferdinand University (now Charles University) in his native city. He received his doctorate from that institution in 1893 and received his habilitation at the university in 1900; the same year he was appointed lecturer at that institution. From 1896 to 1898 he published the Neue musikalische Rundschau together with Hermann Teibler in Prague, from 1897 he worked among other things as an editor for the magazines Neue Revue and Der Kunstwart as well as for the Prager Tagblatt. In 1903 he founded the Austrian Section of the Dürerbundes Prague, which he also headed. He taught on the faculty of the Prague Conservatory in 1906–1907.

In 1908 Batka moved to Vienna, where he was a music critic and writer on music for the daily Vienna newspaper Fremden-Blatt from 1908 to 1919. Together with Richard Specht he was also editor of the journal Der Merker, which was founded in 1909. From 1909 to 1914 Batka taught courses on the history of opera at the University of Music and Performing Arts Vienna.

As a writer, Batka wrote numerous popular music-historical and aesthetic writings. He was one of the first German speaking writers to examine Czech music; and he translated several Czech operas and other Czech literary texts into German. His book Aus der Opernwelt: Prager Kritiken und Skizzen (1907, Munich) was the first book in the German language about Czech opera. He also translated several Polish, Italian and French operas into German, and penned several of his own opera libretti. One of his more important publications, was his three volume discourse on the history of music Allgemeine Geschichte der Musik (Stuttgart, 1909–15).

Batka died in Vienna on April 24, 1922, at the age of 53.

== Work ==
=== Publications ===
- Schumann. Reclam. Leipzig 1891, series Musiker-Biographien, vol. 13.
- J. S. Bach. Reclam, Leipzig 1892, series Musiker-Biographien, vol. 15.
- Musikalische Streifzüge. Diedrichs, Florence 1899.
- Kranz. Gesammelte Blätter über Musik. Lauterbach & Kuhn, Leipzig 1903.
- Denkmäler deutscher Musik in Böhmen. Prague 1905.
- Geschichte der Musik in Böhmen. Vol. 1: Böhmen unter deutschem Einfluß. 900–1333. Dürerverlag, Prague 1906.
- Die Musik in Böhmen. Bard, Marquardt & Co., Berlin circa 1906, series: Die Musik, vol. 18.
- Aus der Opernwelt. Prager Kritiken und Skizzen. Callwey, Munich 1907.
- Richard Strauss. Virgil Verlag, Charlottenburg 1908.
- Allgemeine Geschichte der Musik. Three volumes. Grüninger, Stuttgart 1909, 1912 and 1915 (3rd volume with Wilibald Nagel).
- Richard Wagner. Schlesische Verlagsanstalt, Berlin 1912, series Berühmte Musiker, vol. 20.
- Richard Batka and Aloys Obrist: Klavierspielapparate. Munich, Callwey; Leipzig, Schlüter & Co.: 1914 (4th ed.). (Flugschrift zur Ausdruckskultur, Dürer-Bund; 8)

=== Libretti ===
- Der Zerrissene. Comic opera in three acts after the eponymous play by Johann Nestroy, music by Bretislav Emil Lvovsky, circa 1900.
- Der polnische Jude. Volksoper in two acts after Erckmann-Chatrian by Victor Léon and Richard Batka, music by Karl Weis, 1901.
- Das war ich!. Village idyll after Johann Hutt. Music by Leo Blech, 1902.
- Alpenkönig und Menschenfeind, after the eponymous work by Ferdinand Raimund, music by Leo Blech, 1903.
  The Berlin version of Alpenkönig und Menschenfeind was published under the title Rappelkopf, 1917.
- Aschenbrödel. A fairytale in three acts, music by Leo Blech, 1905.
- Stock im Eisen. Opera in three acts by Richard Batka and Julius Sikkind-Schwarz, music by Leopold C. Welleba.
- Zierpuppen (Les précieuses ridicules). Musical comedy after Molière by Richard Batka, music by Anselm Götzl, circa 1906.
- Versiegelt. Comic opera in one act after Raupach by Richard Batka and Pordes-Milo, music by Leo Blech, 1908.
- Rumpelstilzchen. Fairytale opera in three acts, music by Richard Stöhr, 1911.
- Der Kuhreigen. A musical play in three acts. Poetry after the novella Die kleine Blanchefleure by Rudolf Hans Bartsch, music by Wilhelm Kienzl, premiere 23 November 1911 Vienna, Volksoper.
- Das Hexlein. Comic opera in three acts after a novella by Fritz Wittels, music by Julius Wachsmann, 1912.
- Ländliches Liebesorakel. One-act opera, music by Theodor Veidl, premiere 1913 Teplitz-Schönau.
- Maria von Magdala. Opera in three acts, music by Hans Lio, 1917.
- Der Stier von Olivera. After Heinrich Lilienfein, music by Eugen d’Albert, premiere 1918 Leipzig.
- Eroica. musical drama in three acts (4 scenes), music by Marco Frank, 1918.
- Ilse. Fantastic opera in three acts, music by Richard Stöhr, 1919.
- Die Bäuerin. Opera in one act based on the drama of the same name from Clara Viebig's one-act cycle "Kampf um den Mann" set up by Richard Batka, music by Robert Hernried, 1923.

=== Translations ===
- Bauernrecht (Psohlavci). Opera in three acts (6 scenes) by Karl Šípek after thee novel by Alois Jirásek, music by Karel Kovařovic, premiere 1898 Prague (Übersetzung 1900).
- Die Ahne (L’Ancêtre). Opera in three acts by Lucien Augé de Lassus, music by Camille Saint-Saëns, 1908.
- The Devil and Kate (Čert a Káča). Opera in three acts after a Bohemian folk tale by Adolf Wenig, music by Antonín Dvořák, premiere 1899 (translated circa 1908).
- Lepa Vida (Die schöne Vida). Opera in four acts by Josip Jurčič, music by Risto Savin, 1907, premiere 1909 Laibach.
- Rhea. Opera in three acts by Paul Milliet, music by Spyridon Samaras, 1911, premiere 1908 Florene.
- Die Rosenkönigin (La rosiera). Tragic idyll in three acts by Carlo Zangarini, music by Vittorio Gnecchi, 1912 (translation by Richard Batka and Hans Schilling-Ziemssen).
- Lodoletta. Lyrical drama in three acts by Gioacchino Forzano, music by Pietro Mascagni, 1917.
- Der Liebhaber als Arzt (L’amore medico). Musical comedy in two acts after Molière by Enrico Golisciani, music by Ermanno Wolf-Ferrari, (translated in 1913).
- Das Geheimnis. (Tajemství). Comic opera in three acts by Elišky Krásnohorské, music by Bedřich Smetana, premiere 18 September 1878 Prague.
- Jessika. Comic opera in three acts after The Merchant of Venice by Shakespeare by Jaroslav Vrchlický, music by Josef Bohuslav Foerster, 1905.
- Psyche. Opera in three acts (6 scenes) by André Arnyvelde, music by Maurice Levy, 1910 [textbook] German translation by Dr. Richard Batka

=== Editing ===
- Lully. Comic opera in four acts by Josef Weyl. Arranged for the stage by Richard Batka, music by Karl Hofmann, 1910.
- Die himmelblaue Zeit. Singspiel in three acts by Paul Wertheimer, edited by Richard Batka, music by Oscar Straus, 1914.

== Literature ==
- "Batka Richard". In: Österreichisches Biographisches Lexikon 1815–1950 (ÖBL). Vol. 1, Austrian Academy of Sciences, Vienna 1957, p. 53.
- Wilhelm Virneisel (1953). "Batka, Richard W. A.". Neue Deutsche Biographie (in German). Vol. 1. Berlin: Duncker & Humblot. p. 627. (full text online).
- Horst Seeger: Musiklexikon Personen A–Z. Deutscher Verlag für Musik, Leipzig 1981, p. 69.
- Richard Batka on Vienna History Wiki
- Brockhaus, Riemann Musiklexikon. Vol. 1. Mainz 1998, ISBN 3-254-08396-2.
- Susanne Blumesberger, Michael Doppelhofer, Gabriele Mauthe: Handbuch österreichischer Autorinnen und Autoren jüdischer Herkunft 18. bis 20. Jahrhundert. Vol. 1: A–I. Edited by the Austrian National Library. Saur, Munich 2002, ISBN 3-598-11545-8, p. 73.
- Helmut Brenner/ Reinhold Kubik: Mahlers Menschen. Freunde und Weggefährten. St. Pölten – Salzburg – Vienna 2014, pp. 15–16, ISBN 978-3-7017-3322-4.
