= Felix Prohaska =

Austrian conductor (1912–1987)

Felix Prohaska (16 May 1912 – 29 March 1987) was an Austrian conductor and professor of musicology in Hanover.

== Education ==
Felix Prohaska, born in Vienna, was the son of the composer and professor Carl Prohaska (1869–1927). He received his music education from his father; he studied piano with Eduard Steuermann and music theory with Egon Kornauth and Hans Gál.

== Career ==
Felix Prohaska started his career as a répétiteur at the opera of Graz (1936–1939). Following this, he became a conductor at the opera house in Duisburg (1939–1941). In 1941 he decided to take a position as conductor in Nazi-occupied Strasbourg, where he stayed until 1943. Then came longer stints in Prague, Salzburg and at the Vienna Volksoper (1946–1955).

From 1955 to 1961 Prohaska occupied the position of assistant music director and conductor at the Städtische Bühnen Frankfurt. From 1961 to 1969 he was the director of the Akademie/Hochschule für Musik und Theater Hannover and held a position as professor for musicology until 1975. Prohaska conducted at the Vienna Volksoper (1964–1967) and at the Staatsoper Hannover (1965–1974). For a short time he also taught at the University of Music and Performing Arts Vienna.

Recordings with Felix Prohaska conducting music by Johann Sebastian Bach, Wolfgang Amadeus Mozart, Franz Schubert and Gustav Mahler were issued by Vanguard Classics.

Felix Prohaska died in Vienna in 1987.

== Family ==
Felix Prohaska was the son of Carl Prohaska and the grandfather of the singers Anna Prohaska and Daniel Prohaska.

== Awards ==
- Walter Gieseking medal of Staatliche Hochschule für Musik und Theater Hannover

== Sources ==
- Felix Prohaska biography at bach-cantatas.com
- Literature by and about Felix Prohaska in the German National Library catalogue
- Felix Prohaska in Austria-Forum (in German) (at AEIOU) (death date 24 January 1991)
