= Hector Dufranne =

Belgian opera singer (1870–1951)

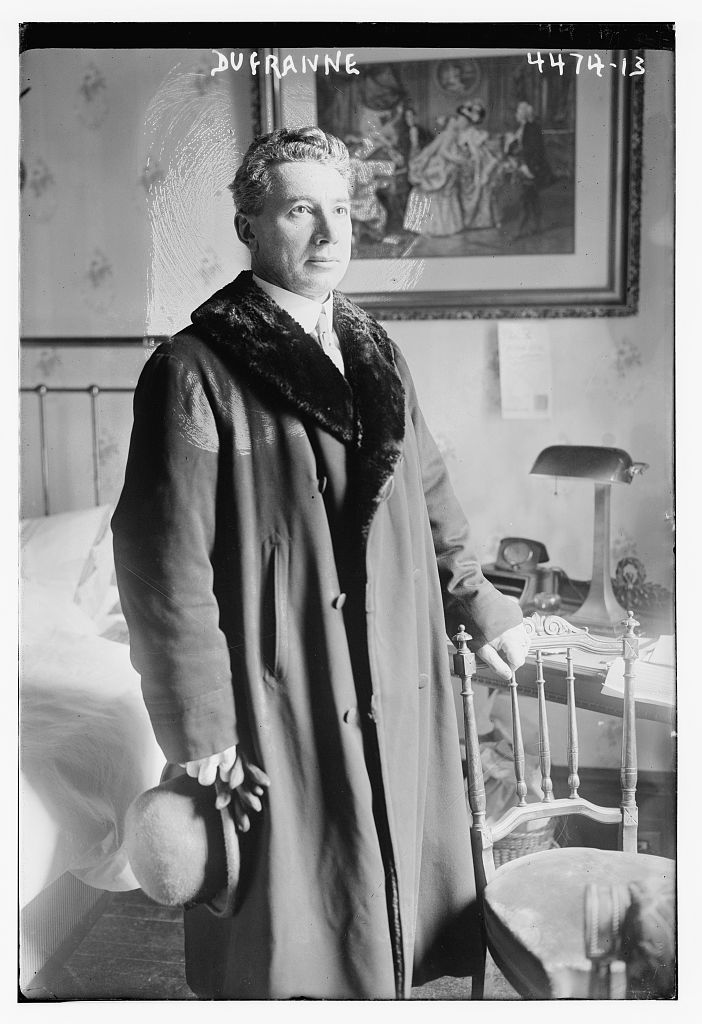
Dufranne in 1918

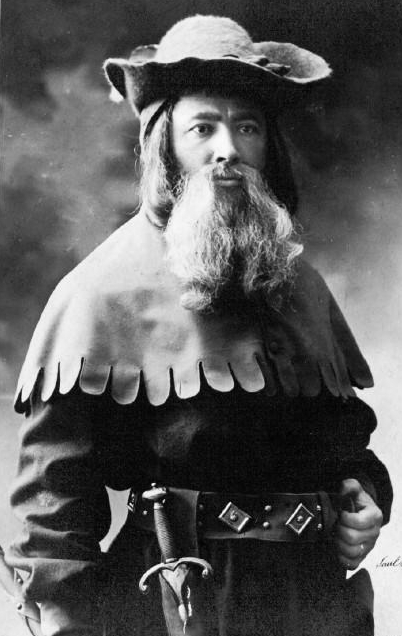
Hector Dufranne in Henri Rabaud's La Fille de Roland

Hector Dufranne (25 October 1870 – 4 May 1951) was a Belgian operatic bass-baritone who enjoyed a long career that took him to opera houses throughout Europe and the United States for more than four decades. Admired for both his singing and his acting, Dufranne appeared in a large number of world premieres, most notably the role Golaud in the original Opéra-Comique production of Claude Debussy's Pelléas et Mélisande at the Salle Favart in Paris in 1902, which he went on to sing 120 times at that house. He had an excellent singing technique which maintained the quality of his voice even into the latter part of his career. His wide vocal range and rich resonant voice enabled him to sing a variety of roles which encompassed French, German, and Italian opera.

== Biography ==
Dufranne was born in Mons. He studied at the Brussels Conservatory with Désiré Demest before making his professional opera debut in 1896 at La Monnaie as Valentin in Charles Gounod's Faust. He returned to that opera house several times to sing such roles as Grymping in Vincent d'Indy's Fervaal (1897), Alberich in Richard Wagner's Das Rheingold (1898), Thomas in Jan Blockx's Thyl Uylenspiegel (1900), Thoas in Christoph Willibald Gluck's Iphigénie en Tauride (1902), the Innkeeper in Engelbert Humperdinck's Königskinder (1912), and Rocco in Ermanno Wolf-Ferrari's I gioielli della Madonna (1913).

Dufranne sang at the Opéra-Comique in Paris from 1900 to 1912, making his first appearance as Thoas. He appeared in several world premieres with the company including creating the roles of Le Marquis in Grisélidis (1901), the title role in Alfred Bruneau's L' Ouragan (1901), Golaud in Pelléas et Mélisande (1902), Amaury-Ganelon in La Fille de Roland by Henri Rabaud (1904), Koebi in Gustave Doret's Les Armaillis (1906), the title role in Xavier Leroux's Le Chemineau, Clavaroche in Fortunio by André Messager (1907), the fiancé in Raoul Laparra's La Habanéra (1908), and Don Iñigo Gomez in Maurice Ravel's L'Heure espagnole (1911). He also sang Scarpia in the Opéra-Comique's first production of Giacomo Puccini's Tosca (1909).

Dufranne also appeared periodically at the Paris Opera beginning in 1907. He notably portrayed the role of John the Baptist in their first production of Richard Strauss's Salome (1910). He also sang at the Opéra de Monte-Carlo in 1907 where he took part in the creation of two world premieres, the role of André Thorel in Jules Massenet's Thérèse and the title role in Bruneau's Naïs Micoulin. In 1914 he sang the role of Golaud in his only appearance at the Royal Opera, Covent Garden in London.

In 1908 Dufranne went to the United States for the first time to sing with the Manhattan Opera Company in the American premiere of Pelléas et Mélisande. He returned for several more productions through 1910, appearing as le Prieur in Le jongleur de Notre-Dame (1909), Caoudal in Sapho (1909), Rabo in Jan Blockx's Herbergprinses (performed in Italian as La Princesse d'Auberge, 1909), John the Baptist in Richard Strauss's Salome (1910), and Le Marquis in Massenet's Grisélidis (1910). He also sang with the Chicago Grand Opera Company and the Chicago Opera Association from 1910 to 1922, creating there Léandre in The Love for Three Oranges (in French) by Sergei Prokofiev, in 1921.

In 1922, Dufranne returned to Paris where he continued to appear in operas in all the major houses in addition to appearing in other opera houses in France. He also spent a brief time performing in Amsterdam in 1935. In 1923 he created the part of Don Quixote in the stage première of El retablo de maese Pedro under the baton of the composer, Manuel de Falla. The performance was for a private audience and was held in the private theatre of Winnaretta Singer, Princess Edmond de Polignac; he repeated the role in a Falla triple-bill at the Opéra-Comique in 1928. In 1924, he appeared at the Théâtre des Champs-Élysées in the world premiere of Léo Sachs's opera Les Burgraves.

With the outbreak of World War II in 1939, Dufranne retired from the stage, his last performance being the role of Golaud at the opera house in Vichy. He lived in Paris where he taught singing for many years before his death in 1951. His voice is preserved on a number of historic recordings made between 1904 and 1928 which have been reissued as CD's on CYP 3612. He can also be heard as Don Iñigo on the first full recording of L’heure espagnole (1929), and as Golaud in extracts from Pelléas et Mélisande (1927).

== Sources ==
- Klaus Ulrich Spiegel: "Noblesse vocale – Der L'Âge d'or-barytone Hector Dufranne – Hamburger Archiv
