= Jeanne Raunay =

French opera singer (1868–1942)

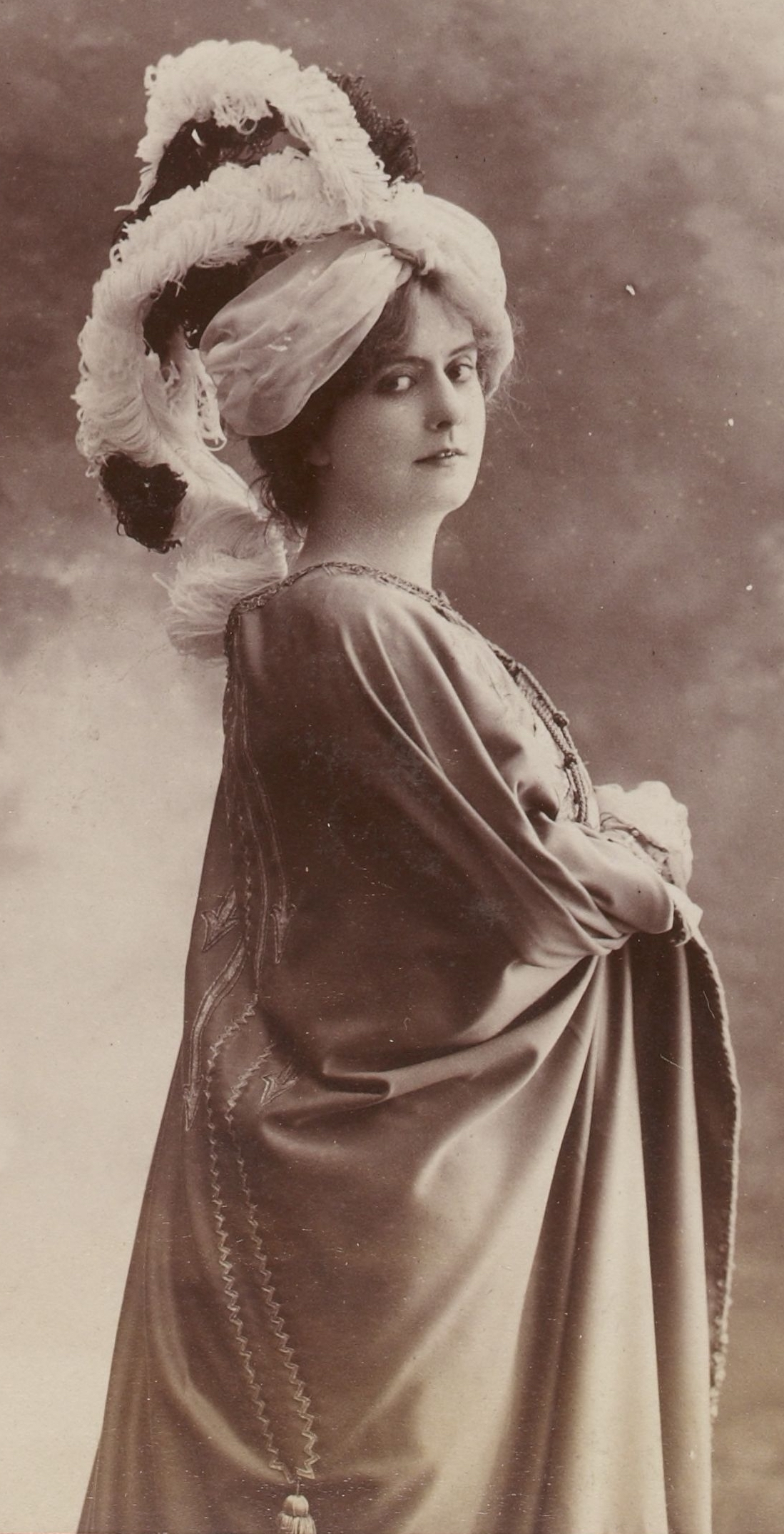
- Jeanne Raunay, by Reutlinger.
- Born: Jeanne Richomme; 25 November 1868; Paris, France
- Died: 1942
- Other names: Jeanne Raunay-Demeny, Jeanne Richomme, Jeanne Filleau, Jeanne Filleau-Raunay
- Occupation: opera singer
- Years active: 1888–1908
- Relatives: Jules Richomme (father); André Beaunier (husband)

Jeanne Richomme Raunay (25 November 1868 – 1942) was a French mezzo-soprano opera singer. She was also the daughter of painter Jules Richomme, and the wife of French writer André Beaunier.

== Early life ==
Jeanne Richomme was born in Paris, the daughter of painter Jules Richomme. Her grandfather was engraver Théodore Richomme.

== Career ==
Raunay's opera debut came in 1888, at the Paris Opera, when she sang Uta in Reyer's Sigurd. She joined the Theatre de la Monnaie in Brussels from 1895 to 1897, and was the first to sing Guilhen in D'Indy's Fervaal (1897). She joined the Opéra-Comique in Paris in 1898, where she was the first to sing Jeannine in Bruneau's L'Ouragan (1901). Other appearances by Raunay included roles in Tannhäuser, Faust, Fidelio, Iphigénie en Tauride, Hérodiade, and Lohengrin. She was considered a beauty of the opera stage. "Blonde, graceful, radiantly beautiful and supremely elegant, Jeanne Raunay counts among the rare singers of real worth whose reputation owes nothing to vulgar réclame or to petty intrigue," noted an American magazine of Raunay, in 1905.

Raunay retired from opera when she married, but she continued singing in concert. In 1910, she sang at the first concert of the Société musicale indépendante, with her friend Gabriel Fauré as her accompanist. In 1923 and 1924 she gave joint recitals with pianist Marguerite Long, performing music by contemporary French composers such as Ravel, Debussy, and Fauré. She taught singing later in life; among her students was Jeanne Manceaux, the older sister of composer Francis Poulenc.

Several composers dedicated works to Raunay. When Fauré's complete song cycle La chanson d'Ève was published in 1911, it was dedicated to Raunay, who had sung much of the work in its premiere performances. Ernest Chausson dedicated his "Chanson perpétuelle" to her. Charles Bordes also dedicated a composition to her, when the song was published in 1914.

== Personal life ==
Jeanne Raunay married twice. In 1889, she married a doctor, Albert Filleau. He died in 1895. She married French writer André Beaunier in 1908. Beaunier died in 1925. She died in 1942, aged 73 years.
