= Ketty Lapeyrette =

French opera singer

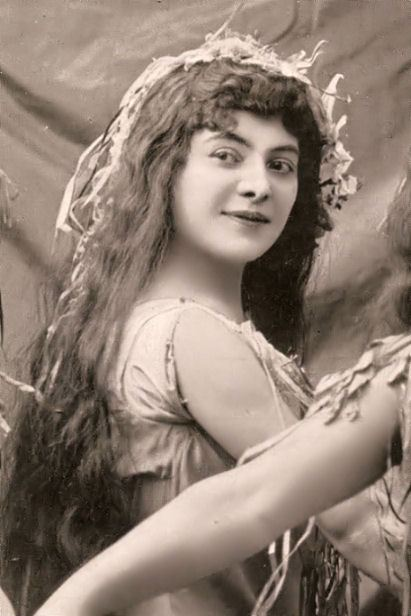
- Ketty Lapeyrette in 1908
- Born: 23 July 1884; Oloron-Sainte-Marie, French Third Republic
- Died: 2 October 1960 (aged 76); Paris, France
- Occupation: Singer
- Years active: 1908–1938

Catherine Julie "Ketty" Lapeyrette (23 July 1884 – 2 October 1960) was a French contralto opera singer. She remained with the Paris Opera for 30 years, seldom performing outside France. From 1944, she taught at the Paris Conservatory.

== Biography ==
Born on 23 July 1884 at Oloron-Sainte-Marie in south-western France, Catherine Julie Lapeyrette studied at the Paris Conservatory under Jean Ernest Masson, Amédée Louis Hettich and Max Bouvet. In 1908 at the Paris Opera, after her début as Dalila in Camille Saint-Saëns' Samson et Dalila, she went on to sing in the premières of Wagner's Götterdämmerung (1908), Rheingold (1909) and Parsifal (1914).

Lapeyrette also appeared at the Opéra-Comique in December 1918 as Amaranthe in Charles Lecocq's La fille de Madame Angot and played Marthe in Charles Gounod's Faust.

In 1923, she appeared as Annina in the French première of Der Rosenkavalier, in 1921 in that of Gabriel Dupont's Antar and in 1923 in that of Albert Roussel's Padmâvatî. She also sang in Alfred Bruneau's Le Jardin du Paris (1924), Max d'Ollone's L'Arlequin (1924), André Bloch's Brocéliande (1925), and in Part II (Sept Chansons) of Gian Francesco Malipiero's L'Orfeide (1928).

In 1931, Lapeyrette performed in Albéric Magnard's Guercœur and in 1933 in the première of Joseph Canteloube's Vercingétorix. She appeared with the Paris Opera company in Milan at La Scala as Dalida in 1910. She sang as a guest in Amsterdam (1936) and in London's Covent Garden as Amme in Paul Dukas' Ariane et Barbe-bleue (1938). She is also remembered for singing Fricka in Der Ring des Nibelungen, Erda in Siegfried, Amneeris in Aida, Mistress Quickly in Verdi's Falstaff, Fides in Giacomo Meyerbeer's Le prophète, Queen Gertrude in Ambroise Thomas's Hamlet, Uta in Ernest Reyer's Sigurd and Klytaemnestra in Richard Strauss' Elektra.

From 1944 she taught voice at the Paris Conservatory. Ketty Lapeytette died in Paris on 2 October 1960.
