= Coiny =

Coiny is a French surname. Notable people with the surname include:

== People ==
- Jacques Joseph Coiny (1761–1809), French engraver
- Joseph Coiny (1795–1829), French engraver, son of Jacques Joseph Coiny

== Fictional characters ==
- Coiny, a character from the first season of Battle for Dream Island, an animated web series
- Coiny, the mascot for PayPal Honey, a money saving website online
