= Fervaal =

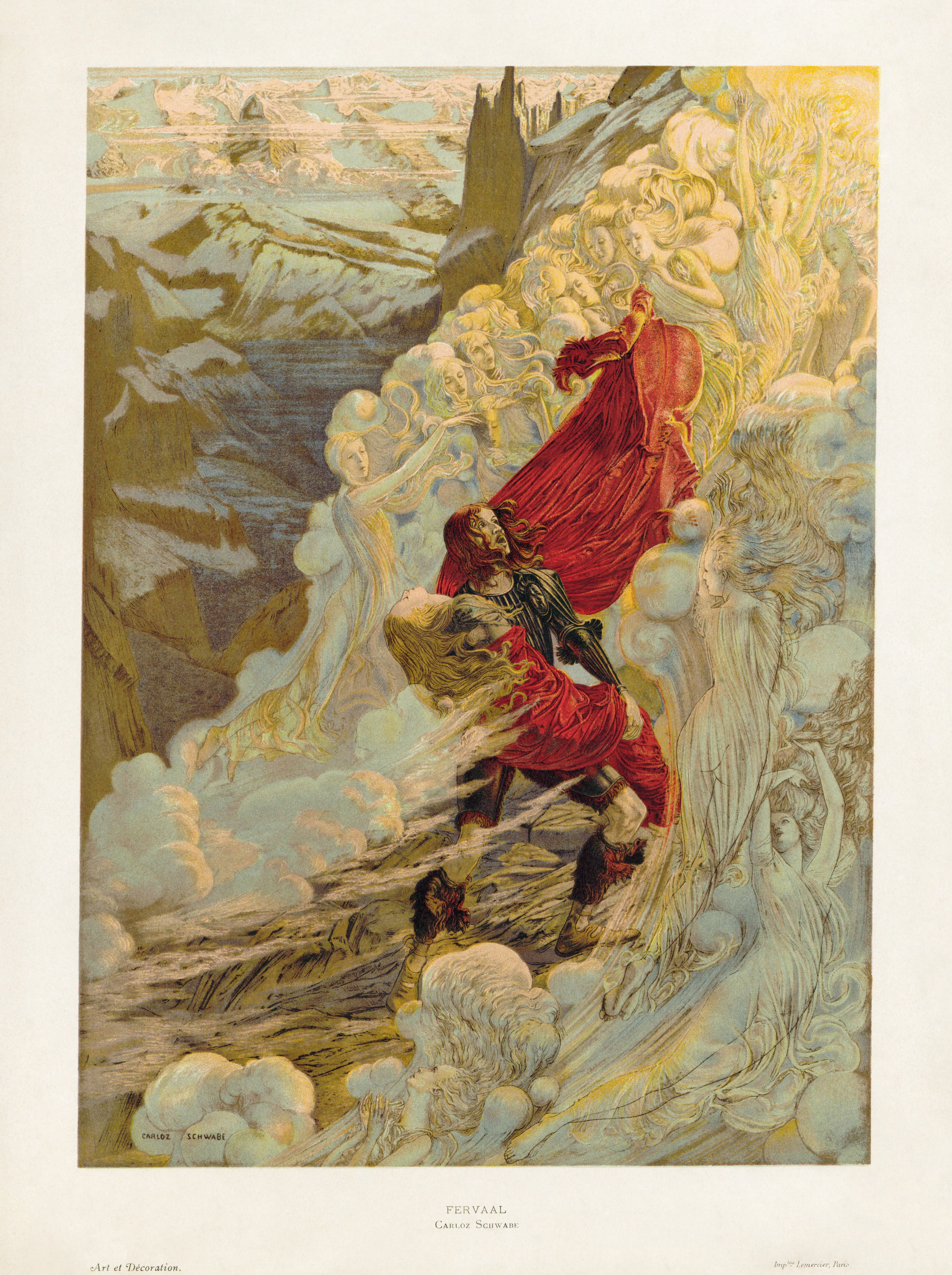
Illustration by Carlos Schwabe, for the Paris première

Fervaal, Op. 40, is an opera (action musicale or lyric drama) in three acts with a prologue by the French composer Vincent d'Indy. The composer wrote his own libretto, based in part on the lyric poem Axel by the Swedish author Esaias Tegnér. D'Indy worked on the opera during the years 1889 to 1895, and the score was published in 1895.

== Background ==
Fervaal premiered at the Théâtre de la Monnaie in Brussels on 12 March 1897. It was subsequently produced in Paris in 1898, and again in that city in 1912. The first of 13 performances by the Opéra-Comique company (at the Théâtre du Châtelet), on 10 May 1898 was conducted by André Messager and included in the cast Raunay and Imbart de la Tour from the Brussels premiere, along with Gaston Beyle, Ernest Carbonne and André Gresse. It was last performed on stage in 1912/13 (at the Paris Palais Garnier, again with Messager conducting).

In concert, it was presented by RTF in 1962. The Bern Opera House presented it in two concert performances, conducted by Srboljub Dinić, on 28 May and 18 June 2009. It was also performed in concert by the American Symphony Orchestra, led by Leon Botstein on 14 October 2009 at Avery Fisher Hall at Lincoln Center in New York City. The Festival de Montpellier revived the work in 2019 with Michael Spyres as Fervaal, Jean-Sébastien Bou as Arfagard and Gaëlle Arquez as Guilhen, with Michael Schønwandt conducting.

Contemporary commentary, such as from Maurice Ravel, described Fervaal as strongly influenced by the operas of Richard Wagner, such as Parsifal. Thus the opera can be described as an epic with Wagnerian allusion. Anya Suschitzky has published a lengthy analysis of the opera in the context of French nationalism and the influence of Wagner on French composers. James Ross has examined Fervaal in the context of French politics of the time, in addition to French nationalism. Manuela Schwartz has discussed in detail the connection between the story of Axel and the opera of Fervaal.

In the context of the religious theme of paganism vs. Christianity in the work, d'Indy uses the old musical theme of "Pange, lingua" as a musical representation of the new religion (Christianity) supplanting the old (paganism).

== Roles ==
roles, voice types, premiere cast
Role	Voice type	Premiere cast, 12 March 1897 Conductor: Philippe Flon
Fervaal, Celtic chief	tenor	Georges Imbart de la Tour
Guilhen, Saracen	mezzo-soprano	Jeanne Raunay
Arfagard, Druid	baritone	Henri Seguin
Kaïto	contralto	Eugénie Armand
Lennsmor, priest	tenor	Paul Isouard
Grymping, priest	baritone	Hector Dufranne
Shepherd		Julia Milcamps
Messenger	baritone	Cadio
Ilbert (Celtic chief)	tenor	Dantu
Chennos (Celtic chief)	tenor	Gillon
Ferkemnat (Celtic chief)	tenor	Victor Caisso
Gwelkingubar (Celtic chief)	bass	Henri Artus Blancard
Berddret (Celtic chief)	bass	Delamarre
Helwrig (Celtic chief)	bass	Charles Danlée
Geywhir (Celtic chief)	bass	Van Acker
Buduann (Celtic chief)	bass	Roulet
Penwald (Celtic chief)	bass	Verheyden
Edwig (Celtic chief)	tenor	Luc Disy
Moussah	tenor	Luc Disy
Peasants, Saracens, Priests and Priestesses, Bards, Warriors, off-stage voices

== Instrumentation ==
- woodwinds: 4 flutes (3rd and 4th doubling piccolos), 2 oboes, cor anglais, 3 clarinets (3rd doubling bass clarinet), bass clarinet (doubling contrabass clarinet), 4 bassoons, 4 saxophones (soprano, 2 altos and tenor)
- brass: 4 horns, 4 trumpets, 8 saxhorns (2 sopranino in E-flat, 2 soprano in B-flat, 2 alto in E-flat, 2 baritone in B-flat), 4 trombones, tuba, cornetto
- percussion: timpani, bass drum, triangle, cymbals, tamtam, two small gongs
- strings: 2 harps, 1st violins, 2nd violins, violas, violoncellos, contrabasses

== Synopsis ==
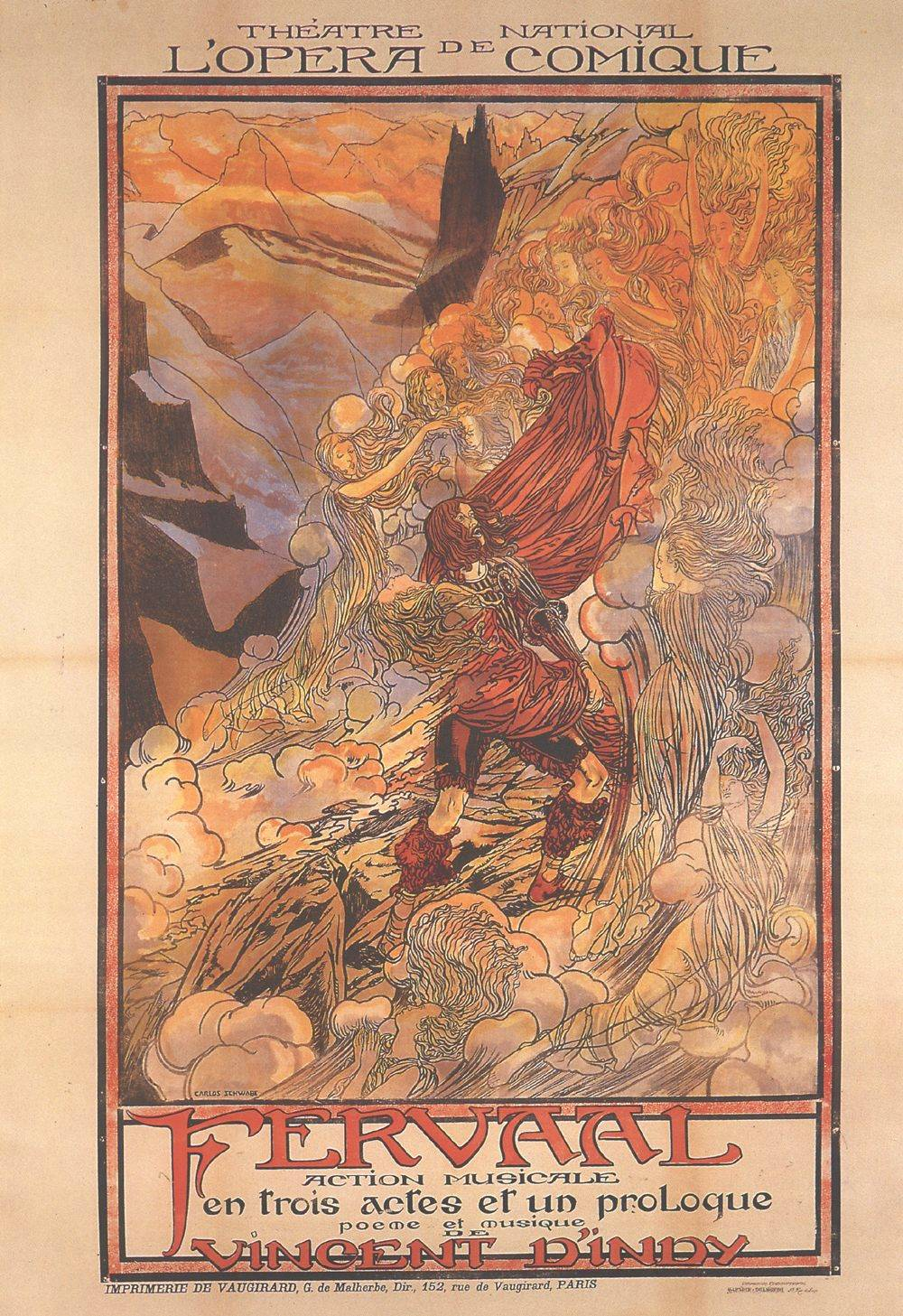
Poster, based on the illustration by Schwabe.

In the prologue, Saracen bandits ambush the Gauls Fervaal and Arfagard, leaving them injured. Guilhen, daughter of the Saracen emir and a sorceress, saves them from death. Guilhen has immediately fallen in love with Fervaal and offers to cure him. The prologue ends with Fervaal being carried to the palace of Guilhen.

In act 1, Arfagard explains to Fervaal the boy's history and upbringing. Fervaal is the son of a Celtic king, from the land of Cravann, and is destined as the last advocate of the old gods (the "Nuées"). He is charged with the mission of saving his homeland from invasion and pillage but must renounce love to fulfill his duty. Upon Guilhen's return, Fervaal returns her love. However, Arfagard calls for Fervaal to leave her and fulfill his mission. After he finally does take leave of Guilhen, she calls forth a mob of her fellow Saracens to revenge her abandonment by invading Cravann.

In act 2, Arfagard and Fervaal have returned to Cravann. They consult the goddess Kaito in the mountains, where she delivers this prophecy:

Si le Serment est violé, si la Loi antique est brisée,
si l'Amour règne sur le monde, le cycle d'Esus est fermé.
Seule la Mort, l'injurieuse Mort, appellera la Vie.
La nouvelle Vie naîtra de la Mort.

If the oath is violated, if the ancient law is broken,
if love reigns over the world, the cycle of Esus is closed.
Only death, injurious death, will call forth life.
From death, new life will be born.

Arfagard does not understand the meaning of the prophecy. Fervaal understands that the violation refers to his own breaking of the oath renouncing love and that the redemptive death will be his in the end. Arfagard introduces Fervaal to the Cravann chiefs, and they hail him as their new commander, or "Brenn". Fervaal anticipates that he will fail as a leader and thus as his land's saviour, but he feels that he can achieve his redemptive death in battle as a military commander. Fervaal tries to explain this situation to Arfagard, who becomes fearful for his people's future.

In act 3, the Cravann army has lost in battle, and Fervaal remains alive, in spite of seeking death in the conflict. He then asks Arfagard to kill him as a sacrifice to fulfill his duty. However, Guilhen appears, which reawaken's Fervaal's love and causes him to change his mind. Arfagard tries to kill Fervaal, but Fervaal instead cuts down Arfagard. Fervaal takes Guilhen away from the battlefield and they begin to ascend a mountain. Exhausted, Guilhen dies in Fervaal's arms. Fervaal laments the deaths of both Guilhen and Arfagard. He then hears the wordless chorus singing the "Pange, lingua" melody. Fervaal carries the body of Guilhen up the mountain, as he realizes that the reign of the "new God" is forthcoming. As he disappears from the scene, an "ideal sun" begins to shine.

== Recording ==
There has not been a complete commercial recording of Fervaal, although there have been several recordings of the Prelude:

- Brussels Royal Conservatory Orchestra; Désiré Defauw, conductor
- L'Orchestre des Concerts Lamoureux; Albert Wolff, conductor, rec 1930
- San Francisco Symphony; Pierre Monteux, conductor, rec 27 January 1945, San Francisco
- Paris Conservatoire Orchestra; Charles Munch, conductor, rec 4 October 1947, Kingsway Hall, London
- Columbia Symphony Orchestra; Thomas Schippers, conductor, recorded 3 April 1961

In 2004, BBC Radio 3 broadcast, as part of its "Composer of the Week" program, a specially made recording of act 3 of Fervaal, with David Kempster, baritone; Christine Rice, mezzo-soprano; Stuart Kale, tenor and the BBC National Chorus of Wales and BBC National Orchestra of Wales conducted by Jean-Yves Ossonce; this was not commercially released.

A full production by French radio was recorded on 22 March 1962 and broadcast on 19 October the same year and was issued on the Malibran label (MR771) in 2015, its first commercial release.

- Jean Moillen: Fervaal; Micheline Grancher: Guilhen; Pierre Germain: Arfagard; Janine Capderou: the goddess Kaïto; Jean Michel: Edwig; Joseph Peyron: Chennos; Christos Grigoriou: Geywihr; Gustave Wion: Berddret; Lucien Lovano: Helwrig; Chorus and Lyric Orchestra of the ORTF; Pierre-Michel Le Conte, conductor.

A recording of a broadcast of a full production exists on archive.org in three parts at part of the Pogonyi Collection. Principals are Fervaal: Rodrigo Orrego; Arfagard: Philippe Rouillon; Guilhen: Sophie Fournier; Kaito: Qin Du; Chor und Extrachor des Stadttheaters Bern; Berner Symphoniecrchester, Srboljub Dinic, conductor. Performance May, 2009, broadcast 13 December 2009:

- Part 1
- Part 2
- Part 3
