= Geneviève de Paris =

Geneviève de Paris is an 1881 cantata by Alfred Bruneau which won the Prix de Rome The aria "Seigneur ! Est-ce bien moi que vous avez choisie?" was recorded by Veronique Gens in 2017.
