= La Chanson d'Ève =

1911 song cycle by Gabriel Fauré

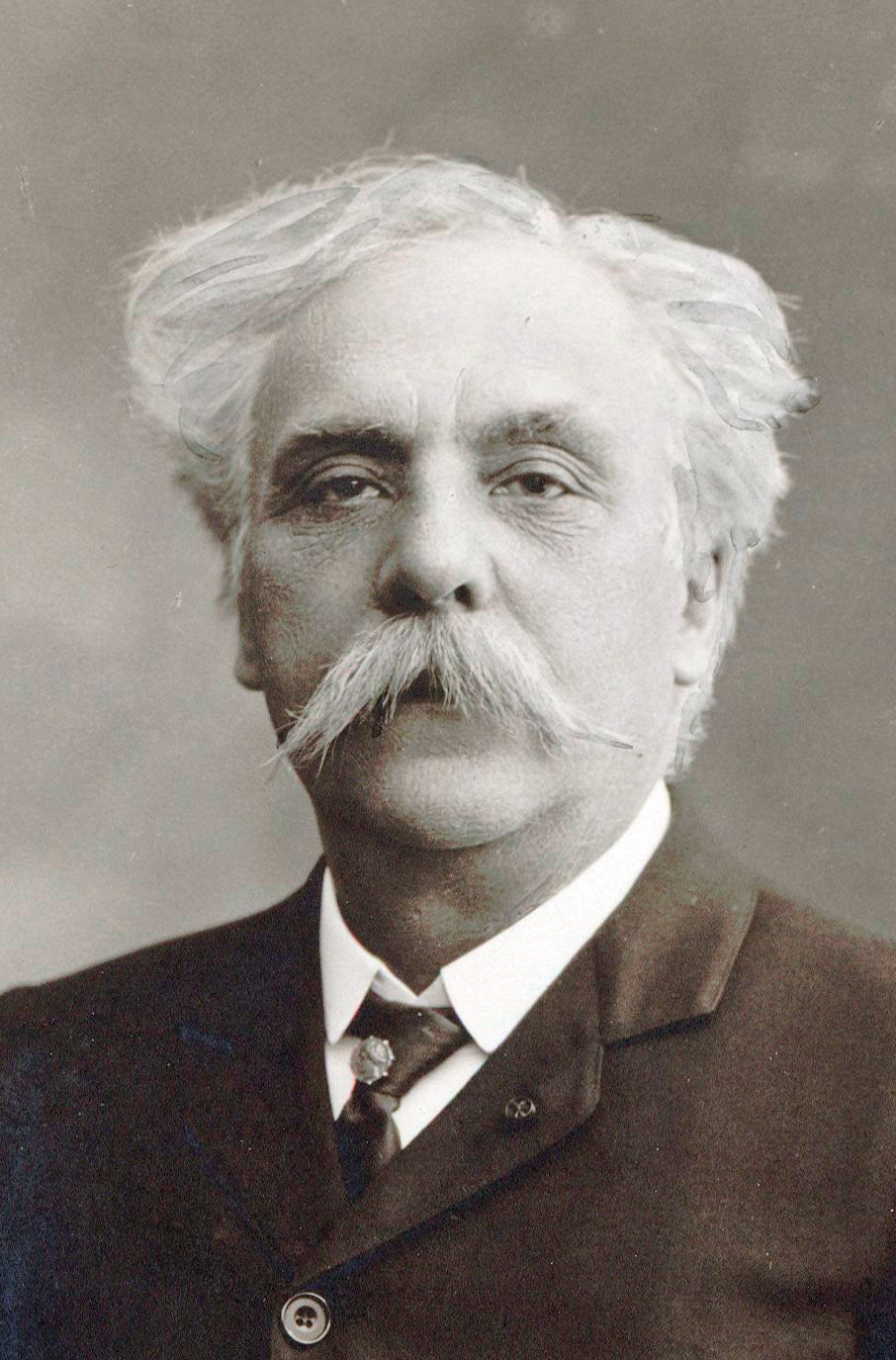
Gabriel Fauré in 1905

La Chanson d'Ève, Op. 95, is a song cycle by Gabriel Fauré, of ten mélodies for voice and piano. Composed during 1906–10, it is based on the collection of poetry of the same name by Charles van Lerberghe. It is Fauré's longest song cycle.

== Composition ==
Fauré was introduced to van Lerberghe's poems by Octave Maus. The songs were composed over the period June 1906 to January 1910. "Crépuscule" came first, in June 1906; its origin was as a re-setting of the music of "Mélisande's Song". The latter, an 1898 setting for voice of "La Chanson de Mélisande" from Act 3 of Fauré's Pelléas et Mélisande, was his only setting of a text in English.

Fauré only conceived the idea of a song cycle after "Crépuscule" had been published as an independent song. The composition of "Paradis" and "Prima verba" followed in September, while Faure was visiting Stresa and Lausanne. "Roses ardentes" and "L'Aube blanche" came in June 1908, and the rest was composed from July 1909. Over these years, Fauré was also working on his opera Pénélope.

== Settings ==
Fauré's settings, selected from three of the four sections of van Lerberghe's collection, are as follows:

1. "Paradis" (from Premières paroles)
2. "Prima verba" (from Premières paroles)
3. "Roses ardentes" (from Premières paroles)
4. "Comme Dieu rayonne" (from Premières paroles)
5. "L'Aube blanche" (from Premières paroles)
6. "Eau vivante" (from Premières paroles)
7. "Veilles-tu, ma senteur de soleil?" (from La tentation)
8. "Dans un parfum de roses blanches" (from Premières paroles)
9. "Crépuscule" (from Crépuscule)
10. "Ô mort, poussière d'étoiles" (from Crépuscule)

== Premieres ==
The first songs to be premiered were "Paradis", "Prima verba" and "Crépuscule", on 18 March 1908 at the Bechstein Hall, sung by Jeanne Raunay. The pianist was Fauré. On 26 May 1909 at the Salle Érard, Raunay and Fauré premiered "Roses ardentes", "Comme Dieu rayonne", "L'Aube blanche" and "Eau vivante", as well as performing the three earlier songs.

Raunay and Fauré premiered the complete cycle on 20 – April 1910 at the first concert of the newly formed Société musicale indépendante. This occasion also saw the premieres of Claude Debussy's D'un cahier d'esquisses and Maurice Ravel's Ma mère l'oye. Ravel wrote to Fauré the next day that he had been extremely moved by Fauré's cycle.

The complete song cycle was published by Heugel in 1911, dedicated to Jeanne Raunay.

== Sources ==
- Johnson, Graham (2009). Gabriel Fauré: The Songs and their Poets. London: Guildhall School of Music and Drama. ISBN 978-0-7546-5960-0.
- Nectoux, Jean-Michel (2004). Gabriel Fauré: A Musical Life. Cambridge: Cambridge University Press. ISBN 0-521-61695-6.
- Orledge, Robert (1979). Gabriel Fauré. London: Eulenburg Books. ISBN 0-903873-40-0.
