= Berthold Tours =

Dutch composer (1838–1897)

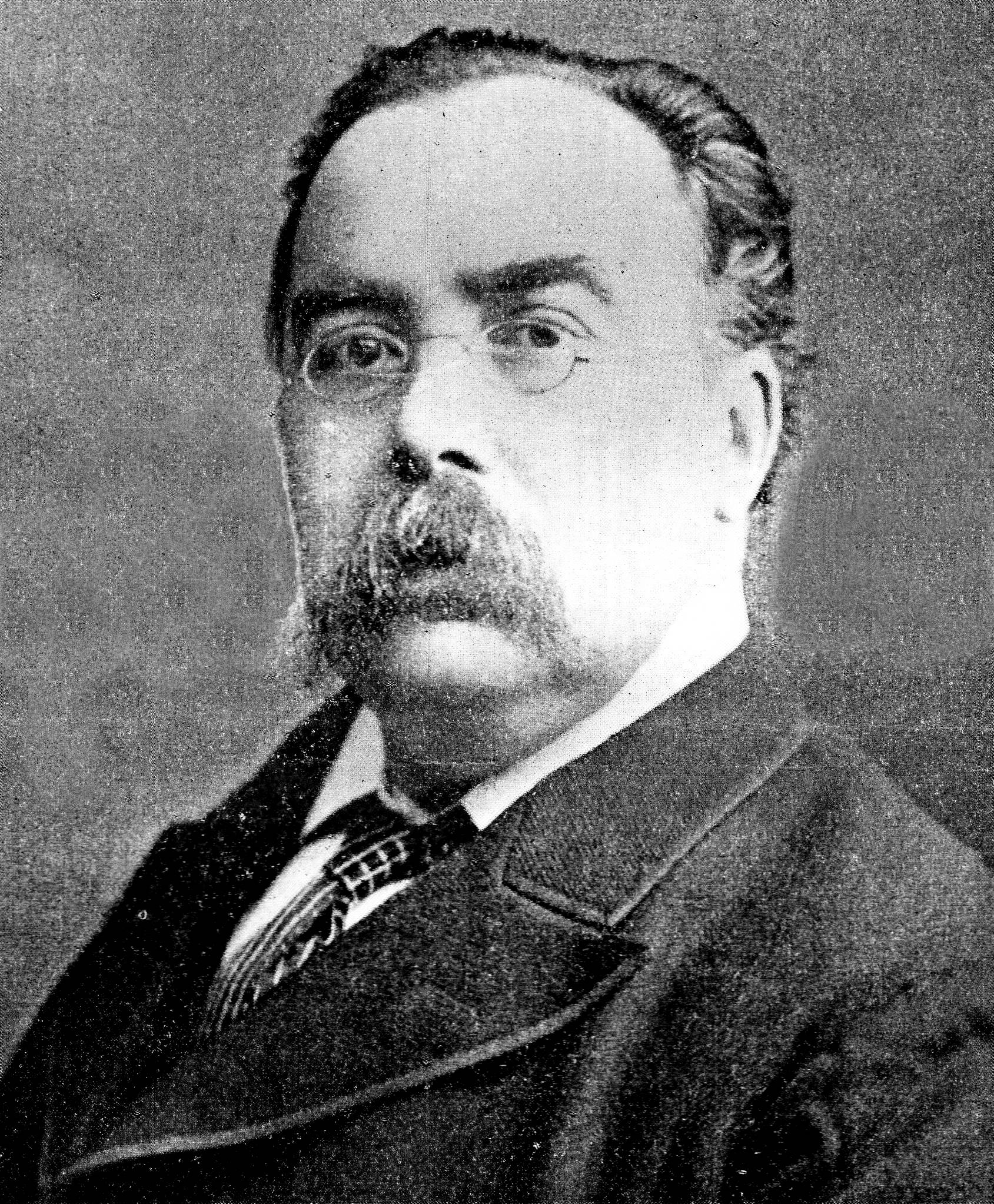
Berthold Tours c. 1887

Berthold Tours (Rotterdam, Dec 17, 1838 – London, Mar 11, 1897) was a Dutch-born English violinist, composer and music editor. His first music teacher was his father, Barthelemy Tours (1797-1864), who was organist of the Groote or St Laurens Kerk in Rotterdam for thirty years, a conductor, and a violinist of European wide reputation, while he studied composition with Johannes Verhulst. Later, he studied composition with François-Joseph Fétis at the conservatory in Brussels and then continued his studies in Leipzig.

In Leipzig, Tours received an invitation from Prince George Galitzin, a fellow student, to go to Russia as second violinist in a string quartet that would be engaged by the tsar. The quartet performed in the Winter Palace in St. Petersburg and in neighbouring palaces. Tours then became the assistant director of the chorus in the Imperial Opera and then went with Galitzin to Covent Garden, London in 1861, as a score-reader. He was organist at St Helen's, Bishopsgate from 1864 to 1865, at St Peter's, Stepney from 1865 to 1867, and finally at the Swiss Church, Holborn from 1867–79.

After Galitzin's death, Tours became an editor for Novello & Co in 1872, and chief editor in 1878 in succession to Sir John Stainer. The works he edited included Iphigenia in Aulis, Iphigenia in Tauris and Orpheus by Gluck; L'Étoile du nord by Meyerbeer; Il seraglio and Zauberflöte by Mozart; Guillaume Tell by Rossini; Der Fliegender Holländer and Lohengrin by Wagner; Euryanthe by Weber; Mendelssohn's Elijah; Gounod's Mors et Vita and Redemption, numerous piano albums, and many others. He also arranged scores of the Gilbert and Sullivan operas Patience and Iolanthe for piano and voice.

He was also a composer and composed a cantata for female voices called The Home of Titania (1893); an anthem entitled A Festival Ode (1893) for organ and soprano, which was performed at the inauguration of the new organ in St. Basil's Church in Bassaleg, Wales; a setting of the Anglican Holy Communion in C; a setting of the Te Deum in F; the anthems, Behold, the Angel of the Lord, The Pillars of the Earth are the Lord's, O Saving Victim and God Has Appointed a Day; incidental music to Shakespeare's Hamlet and Romeo and Juliet, and a violin primer called simply The Violin, along with a book of thirty melodies for the violin. This tutor was used in Britain and the United States and sold almost a hundred-thousand copies. He also composed works for organ including, Fantasia in C, Allegretto Grazioso, Menuetto and Postlude.

Tours's sister was the wife of Woldemar Bargiel and his former pupil. His son and pupil Frank Tours (1877-1963) became a noted theatrical conductor, composer, and arranger in London and New York, and eventually became a studio musical director in Hollywood; he did most of the orchestrations for Irving Berlin's score for The Cocoanuts (1925) starring the Marx Brothers, and was musical director for the 1929 screen version of the play. Another former pupil was the composer and author Arthur Hervey.
