= Jules Richomme =

French painter

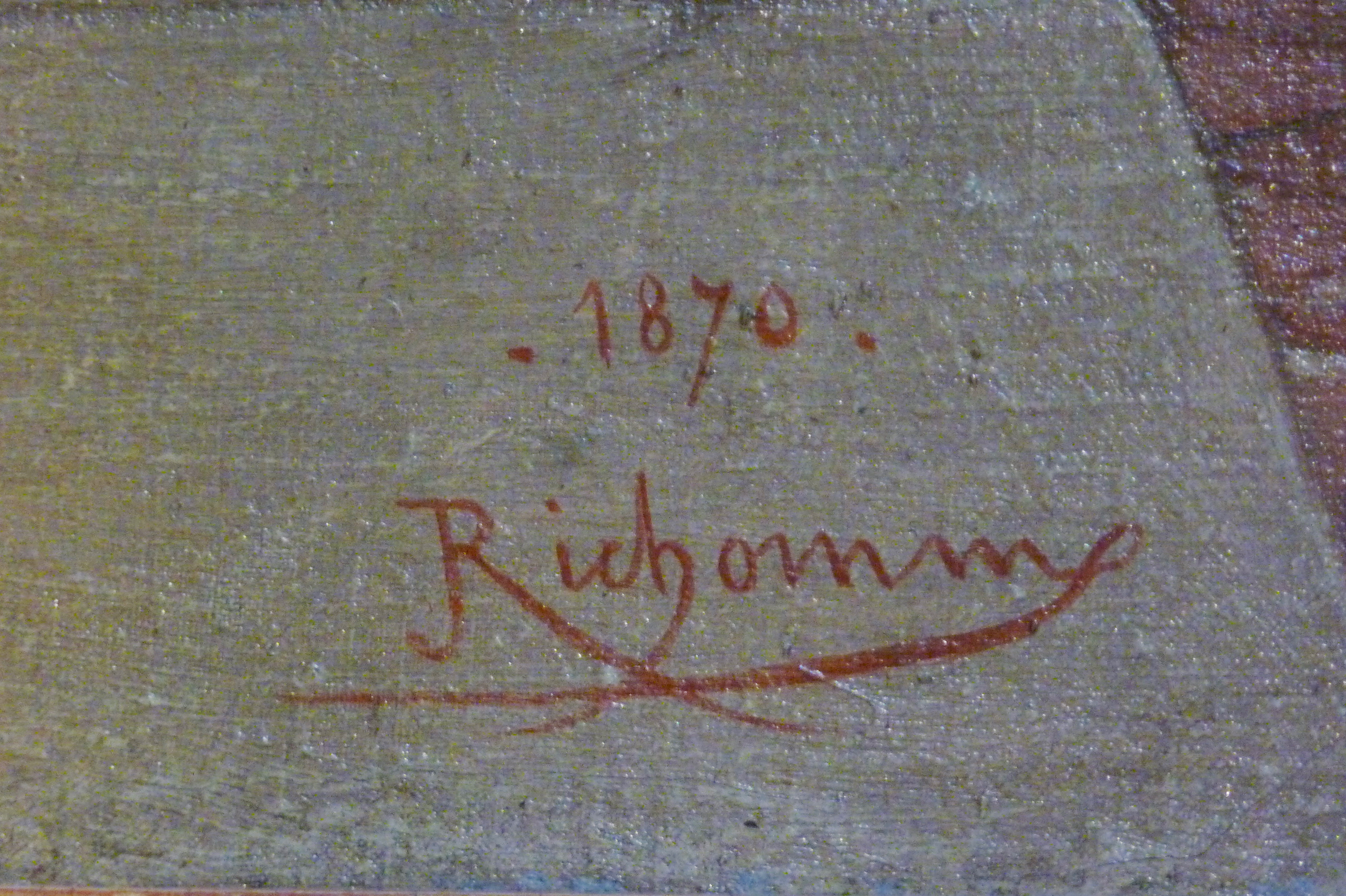
Jules Richomme's signature

Jules Richomme (9 September 1818 in Paris – 16 October 1903 in Paris) was a French painter, designer, and engraver. He painted portraits, landscapes, history and genre scenes.

== Biography ==
He was the only son of the engraver Théodore Richomme. He initially studied with his father, then became a student of Michel Martin Drolling at the Beaux-Arts de Paris. His first exhibit at the Salon came in the Salon of 1833. He would exhibit there regularly until the 1880s; winning medals in 1840, 1842, 1861 and 1863. He took part in the Prix de Rome competitions in 1838 and 1840, but was unsuccessful.

In 1847, he made an extended visit to Italy; spending much of his time in Rome. This resulted in a change to his style; inspiring him to make his paintings brighter and more lively. In 1855, he received an honorable mention at the Exposition Universelle. During that year and the following, he worked with Camille Corot on decorating two chapels at the church of Saint-Nicolas-et-Saint-Marc in Ville-d'Avray.

More decorations followed; in the chapel of Saint Vincent de Paul at the church of Saint-Séverin (1861), and in the chapel of the Virgin at the church of Notre-Dame-de-la-Nativité de Bercy (1863).

Around 1865, he married the lyric soprano Jenny Paupaille (born c.1835). He adopted the son from her first marriage, Camille Dumény, who became a well-known comic actor. Their daughter Jeanne also became an opera singer, and wife of the novelist André Beaunier. His connections to the theater led to a lifelong friendship with the composer, Charles Gounod. Their correspondence was later published by his son-in-law.

He also created non-religious decorations; including those at the Cour d'assises for the Seine (1868). In 1879 he was one of the painters chosen by the French government to decorate the Théâtre de Cherbourg.

In addition to painting historical and religious subjects, such as scenes from the life of Joan of Arc, Francis I of France, and Jacques Cœur, he created engraved illustrations of scenes from the Bible.

== Works exhibited at the Salon ==
- Portrait M. A..., avocat - drawing, 1833 Salon,
- Jeune femme et son enfant, 1836 Salon,
- La Sainte Famille - drawing after Raphael, 1837 Salon,
- Portrait de M. A. L..., 1839 Salon,
- Portrait d'homme, 1840 Salon,
- Abraham par le conseil de Sara prend Agar pour femme - Portrait de femme, 1842 Salon,
- Saint Pierre repentant, 1843 Salon,
- Saint Sébastien délivré par les saintes femmes - Portrait du colonel de Saint A... - Portrait d'homme, 1844 Salon,
- Incrédulité de saint Thomas - Portraits des enfants de M. Ch. P..., 1845 Salon,
- Le Christ apparaît à saint Martin, Le repentir de saint Pierre - Léda, 1848 Salon,
- Érigone - La fiancée du roi de Garbe, 1849 Salon,
- Conversion de la Madeleine - Portrait de Mme R... - Portrait de Melle C... - Vue de Saint-Pierre de Rome, vue de la villa Pamfili-Doria - Vue des Casius Corsini et Valentini, rue de la ville Pamfili-Doria à la porte San Pancrace - Vue du pont Lamentano - Vue de la tour de Cervaro (road from Rome to Tivoli), 1850 Salon,
- Mendiante italienne, États Romains, 1852 Salon,
- Jésus guérissant un paralytique - L'Amour fuyant l'ivresse - Portrait de femme, 1853 Salon,
- Notre Seigneur Jésus-Christ guérit une femme malade - Portrait de Mme R... - Portrait de Melle V. T... - Portrait de M. H..., curé de Saint-Séverin - Portrait de M. A. G..., 1855 Salon,
- Saint Nicolas sauvant des matelos - Portrait de M. Leroy de Saint-Arnaud, conseiller d'État, maire du 12e arrondissement, 1857 Salon,
- Portrait de Melle L. S. de L... - Portrait de M. Varé, architecte paysagiste, 1859 Salon,
- Laissez venir à moi les petits enfants - Décoration d'une partie de la chapelle de Saint-Vincent-de-Paul dans l'église Saint-Séverin de Paris sketch - L'étude interrompue - Jeune mère, souvenir d'Italie - Portrait de femme, 1861 Salon,
- Consolatrix afflictorum (for the church at Bercy) - Portrait de M. A. V... - Portrait de Melle C. V..., 1863 Salon,
- Saint Pierre d'Alcantara guérissant un enfant malade réexposé en 1867 - La leçon de lecture, 1864 Salon,
- Le baptême de Jésus-Christ - Portrait d'enfant, 1865 Salon,
- La décollation de saint Jean-Baptiste, 1866 Salon,
- Portrait de M. J. L... - La famille P... portraits en costume Louis XIII, 1867 Salon,
- Christ en croix - Portrait du docteur Charles V..., 1868 Salon,
- Portrait de Mme C..., 1869 Salon,
- Châteaux en Espagne - L'adoration des bergers (carton pour la chapelle de l'Annonciation de la cathédrale de Bordeaux, 1870 Salon,
- Vergiss mein nicht - Portrait d'enfant, 1872 Salon,
- Consolation - L'éducation d'Achille, 1873 Salon,
- Les Tuileries après la Commune watercolour - Le Point du Jour après l'entrée de l'armée de versailles, mai 1871 watercolour - L'Hôtel de ville après l'incendie, mai 1871 watercolour, Toilette - Ne reveillez pas un chat qui dort, 1874 Salon,
- L'averse - La petite paresseuse - Première leçon de violon, 1875 Salon,
- La colombe - Portrait de la marquise Ginovi, 1876 Salon,
- Femme arabe - La poupée chinoise, 1877 Salon,
- Portrait de M. de H..., 1878 Salon,
- Portrait de M. B. M... - Veilleuse, 1879 Salon,
- Portrait de M. S... - Portrait, 1880 Salon,
- Le repas chez le pharisien, 1881 Salon,
- Amours en chasse - Au Prado, Marseille, 1882 Salon.

== Selected paintings ==
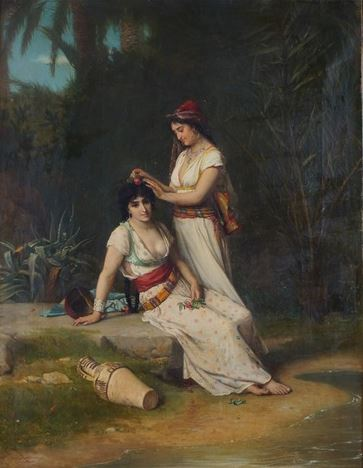
Young Oriental Women
at their Toilette

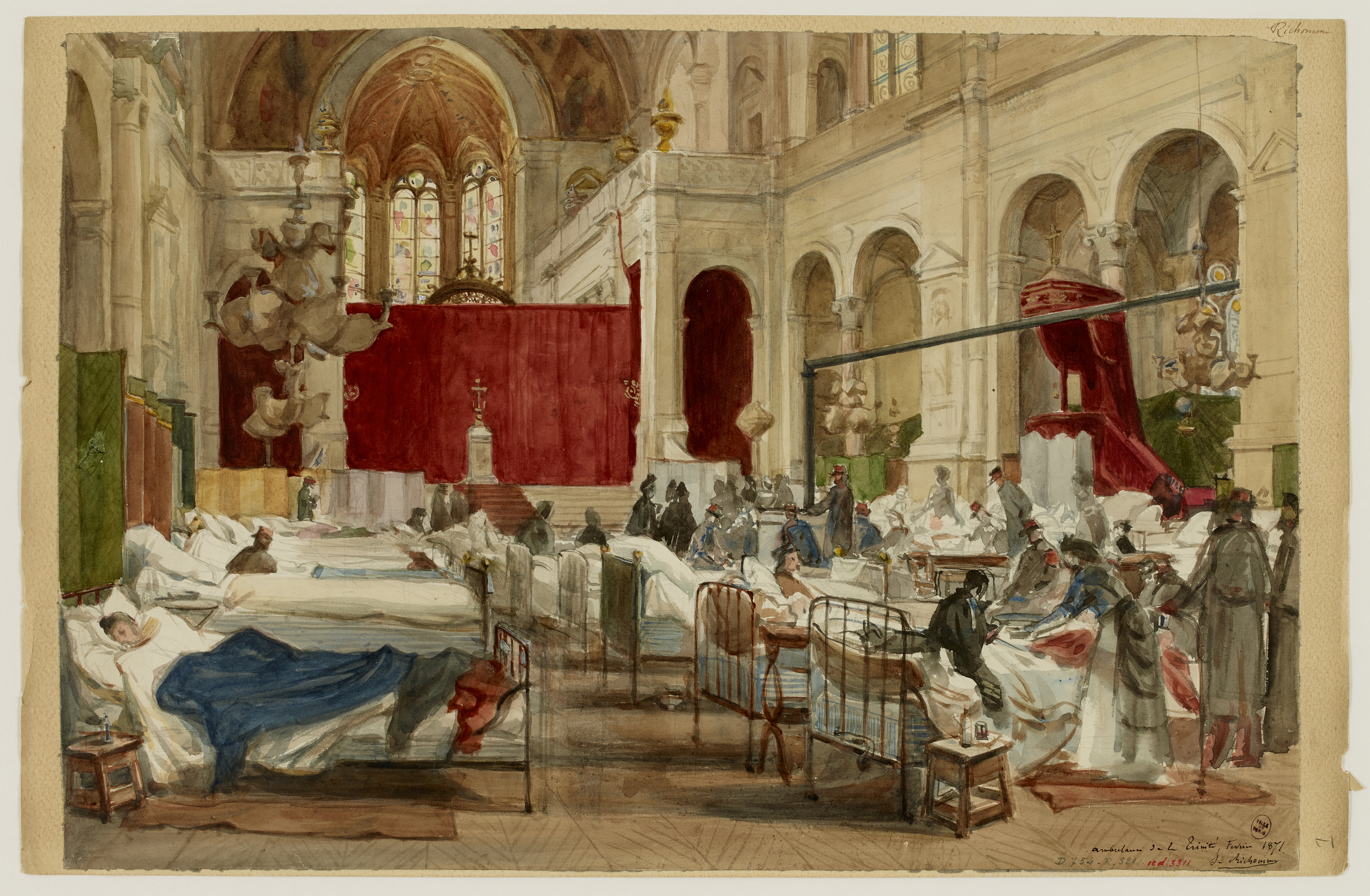
Makeshift Hospital at Trinity Church in 1871

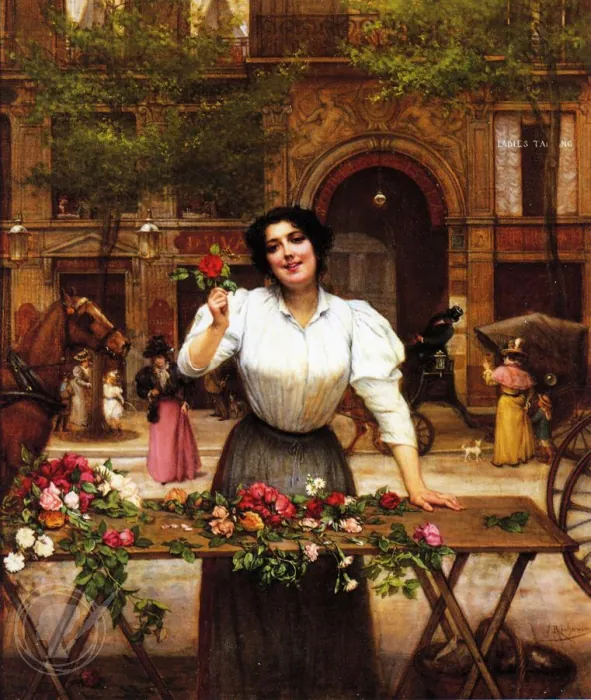
The Bouquet Stand

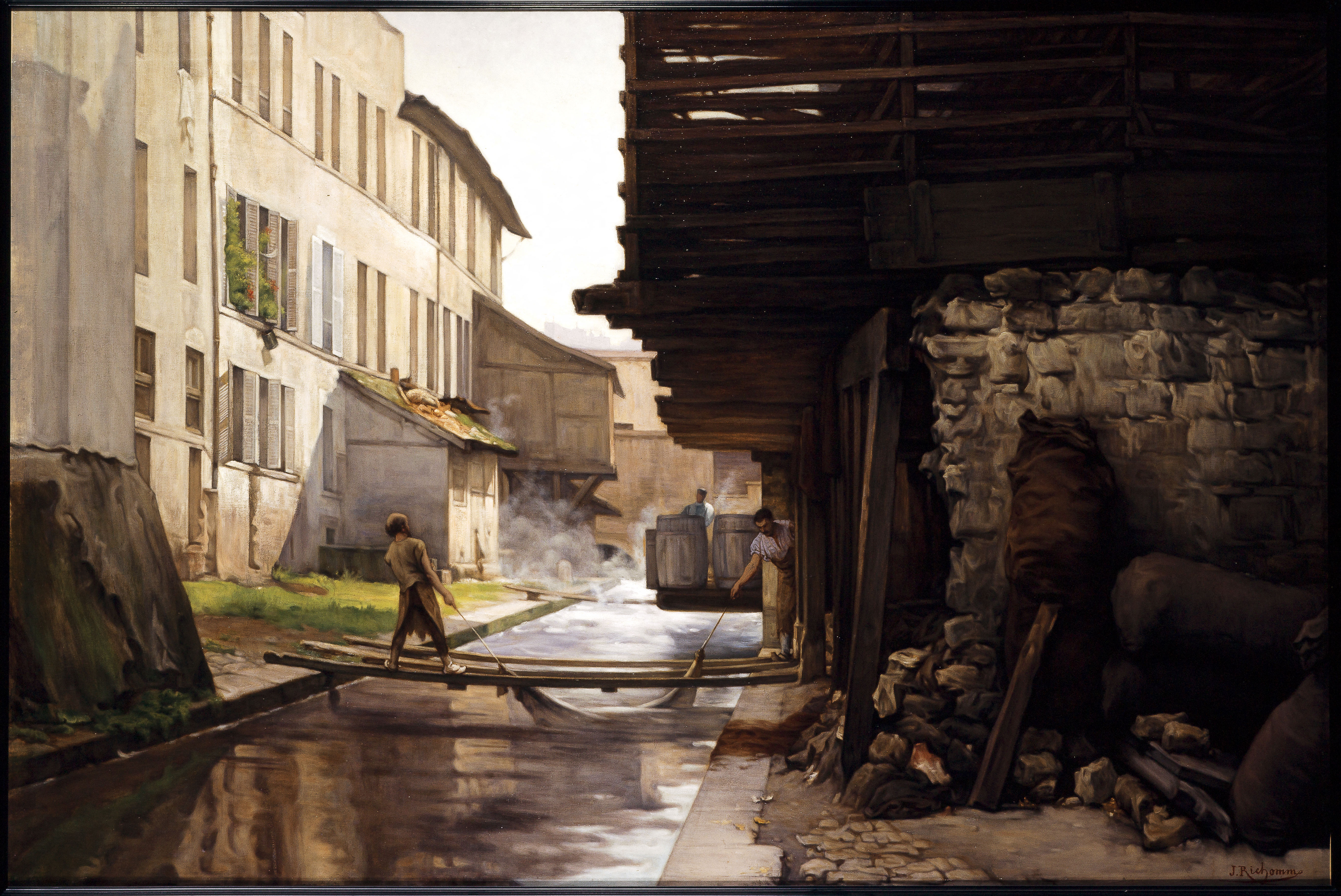
Tannery on the Bièvre

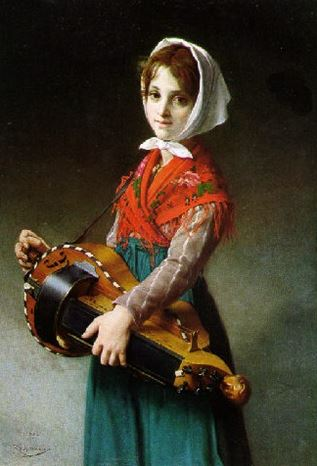
The Hurdy-Gurdy Girl
