= Lazare (Bruneau) =

Lazare is a 1902 French-language drame lyrique/oratorio by Alfred Bruneau to an 1896 poem by Émile Zola.

== Recording ==
- Louis-Jacques Rondeleux as Lazarus, Jean Giraudeau as Jesus, Giselle Desmoutiers as Lazarus' wife, Claudine Collart as the child, Helene Bouvier as Lazarus' mother, Orchestre Radio-Symphonique de Paris, Eugène Bigot 1957
