= L'Enfant roi =

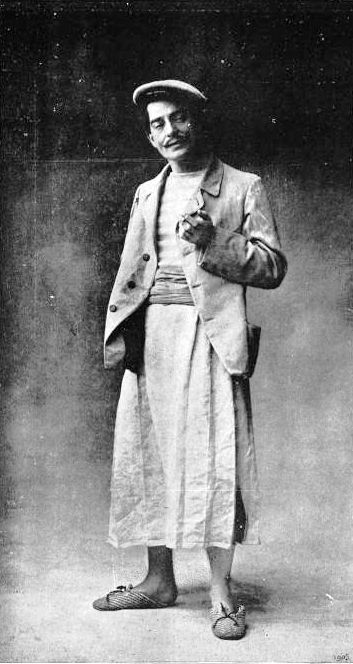
Jean Périer as Auguste in L'Enfant roi

L'Enfant roi is a 1905 opera by Alfred Bruneau to a libretto by Émile Zola.
