= Chanson perpétuelle =

Musical composition by Ernest Chausson

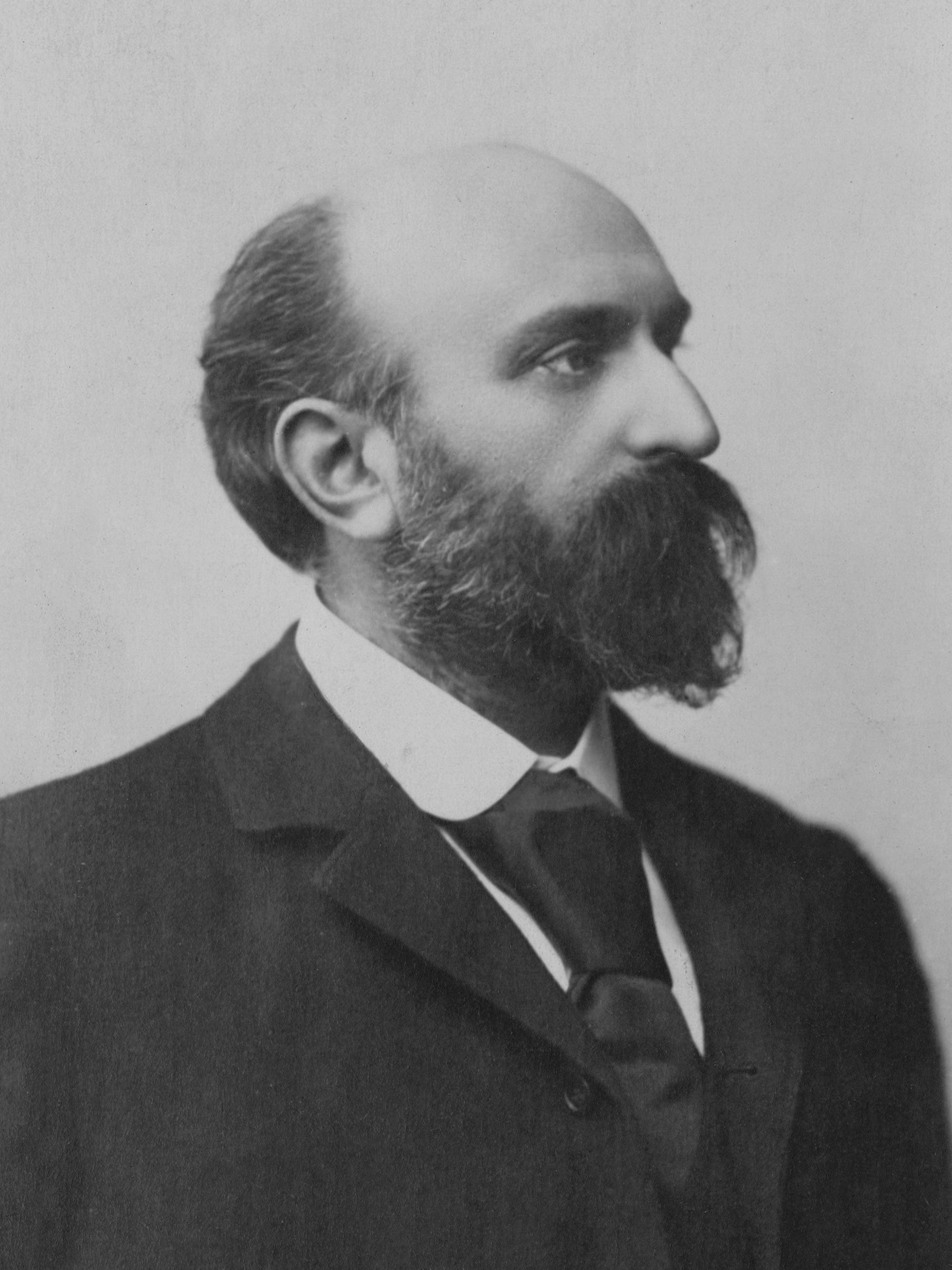
Ernest Chausson, photograph by Guy & Mockel, Paris, ca. 1897

The "Chanson perpétuelle", Op. 37 is a mélodie by Ernest Chausson, written in December 1898. It is one of the major vocal-orchestral works of Chausson, along with the Poème de l'amour et de la mer. Besides the better-known version for soprano and orchestra, Chausson also wrote a version for soprano, piano and string quartet. The text comes from a poem by Charles Cros, describing the suffering of an abandoned woman.

It is the last completed work by Chausson, as he left his String Quartet, Op. 35, unfinished. The work was dedicated to the singer Jeanne Raunay, who gave the premiere on January 28 or 29, 1899. Half a year later, Chausson himself died in an accident. The score was not published until 1911.

A performance of the Chanson lasts about six or seven minutes.
