= Théodore Richomme =

French engraver (1785–1849)

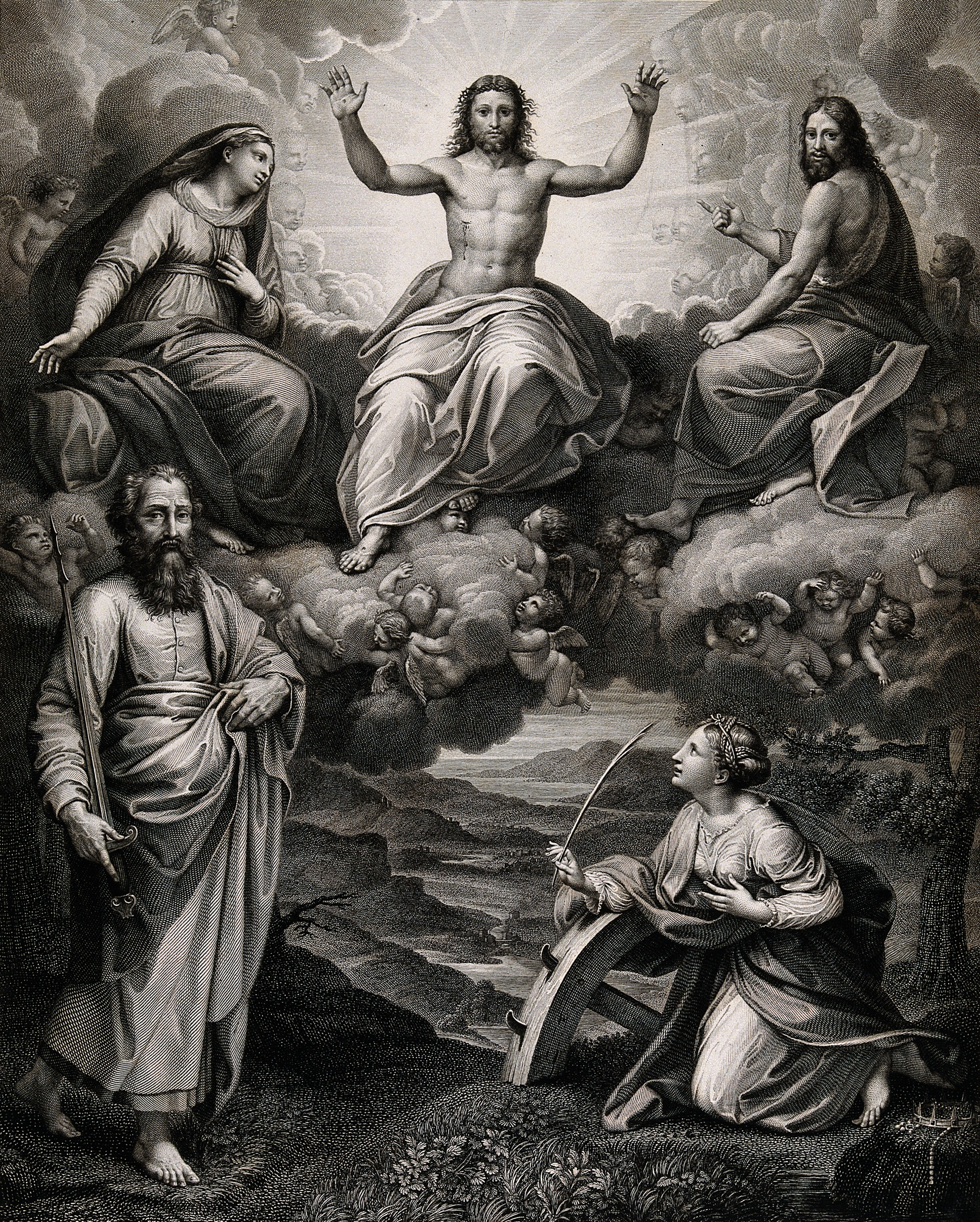
Christ with the apostle Paul, after Pierre Bouillon and Raphael.

Théodore Richomme (28 May 1785, Paris - 22 September 1849, Paris) was a French engraver. A street in the 18th arrondissement of Paris is named after him.

== Life ==
A student of Jacques Joseph Coiny, Théodore Richomme won the prix de Rome in 1806. While in Rome he focused on studying works by Raphael and Giulio Romano and reproduced them. He also made engravings of works by his own contemporaries, such as François Gérard, Pierre-Narcisse Guérin and Ingres. He was made a knight of the Légion d'honneur in 1824 and elected a member of the Académie des beaux-arts in 1826.

His son Jules Richomme (1818–1903) was a painter and an engraver. His pupils included Pierre François Eugène Giraud, Charles-Victor Normand and Victor Florence Pollet.
