= Arthur Hervey =

Irish composer and author

Arthur Hervey (26 January 1855 – 10 March 1922) was an Irish composer, music critic, and an expert in French music.

== Life ==
Hervey was born in Paris of Irish parentage – his father was Charles J.V. Hervey who owned Killiane Castle in County Wexford, Ireland. He was educated at the Oratory, Birmingham, and studied in London with Berthold Tours and Edouard Marlois, two organist-composers with a French background. Hervey worked as music critic for Vanity Fair (1889–92) and The Morning Post (1892–1908). He died in London.

== Music ==
Hervey composed in many forms including opera and orchestral music. Some of his larger works were written for and performed at major British music festivals at Cardiff, Norwich and Brighton. A French influence is detectable in his early chamber music. His wife Clare (née Harrison, widowed Webster) occasionally contributed the words to some of his songs and the libretto to his second opera Ilona (1914). In an obituary for the Musical Times, his musical language was described as being "always marked by melodiousness, straightforwardness of utterance, and polish of manner".

Since 1959, the Royal Academy of Music (RAM) in London is awarding an annual Arthur Hervey Prize in the form of a scholarship for an outstanding young composer, which was initiated in memory of Hervey by bequest of his step-daughter, Nancy Webster. A relief portrait of Hervey in carved marble is preserved in the museum of the RAM.

== Writings ==
Despite his substantial musical oeuvre Hervey remained mainly known for his writings, which include biographical studies of composers, most of which being devoted to French contemporaries like Saint-Saëns and Bruneau. He was widely regarded as an expert on French music. His viewpoint was very open-minded for its time, with an exception in the impressionists, and particularly Debussy, whom he regarded as "decadent".

== Selected compositions ==
Opera

- The Fairy's Post-box, opera in 1 act (libretto: John Palgrave Simpson); London, Court Theatre, 21 May 1885
- Ilona, opera in 1 act (libretto: Clare Hervey); London, Court Theatre, 12 May 1914

Vocal music

- Sechs Liebeslieder (Heinrich Heine) for voice and piano (1883)
- Herzens-Stimmen (H. Heine) for voice and piano (1884)
- Neue Liebeslieder (various poets) for voice and piano (c.1890)
- 12 Songs of Heine for voice and piano (c.1895)
- The Gates of Night (author unknown) for baritone and orchestra (1901)
- many individual songs incl. Love of my Life, May Song, Once, Mine All, etc.

Orchestral music

- Love and Fate, dramatic overture (1890)
- Two Tone Pictures (1. On the Heights; 2. On the March) (1902)
- Youth, concert overture (1902)
- In the East, symphonic poem (1904)
- Life Moods, symphonic variations (1910)

Piano music

- Dans ma nacelle (1875)
- Eglantine (1875)
- Paquita (1875)
- Six Album Leaves (1888)
- A basso porto (1900)
- Three Pieces (c.1915)

Chamber music

- Réverie for violin or flute or cello with piano (1882)
- Cantilène for cello and piano (1895)
- Légende espagnole for cello and piano (1895)
- Berceuse for violin and piano (1900)
- Elevation for violin and piano (1902)

== Selected writings ==
- Masters of French Music (London, 1894)
- French Music in the XIXth Century (London, 1903)
- Alfred Bruneau (London, 1907)
- Franz Liszt and his Music (London, 1911)
- The Life of Rubinstein (London, 1913)
- Saint-Saëns (London, 1921)
