= Les Quatre journées =

1916 opera by Alfred Bruneau

Les Quatre journées (Four Days) is a 1916 opera in four acts by Alfred Bruneau to a libretto he adapted from Émile Zola's short story "Les Quatre journées de Jean Gourdon"" from his 1874 collection Nouveaux contes à Ninon, one of several of Bruneau's operas based on texts by Zola. Les Quatre journées premiered on 19 December 1916 at the Opéra-Comique, Paris. Bruneau dedicated the work to "Madame Paul de Choudens", his publisher's wife. The four acts are named Spring, Summer, Autumn, Winter.

== Roles ==
Roles, ages of the characters throughout the opera, premiere cast
Role	Age of the role throughout the opera	Voice type	Premiere cast, 19 December 1916 Conductor: Alfred Bruneau
Babet	16 years old in act 1; 40 years old in act 3; 58 years old in act 4	soprano	Marthe Davelli
Marguerite	30 years old in act 3 and 48 years old in act 4	contralto	Dolorès de Silvera
Jean	18 years old in act 1; 24 years old in act 2; 42 years old in act 3; 60 years old in act 4	tenor	Charles Fontaine
L'Abbé Lazare	50 years old in act 1; 74 years old in act 3	barytone	Jean Périer
Frantz	20 years old in act 2; 38 years old in act 3; 56 years old in act 4	barytone or basso cantante	André Allard
Jacques	18 years old in act 4	tenor	Arthur Lheureux
La petite Marie	10 years old in act 4	boy soprano	André

There is as well a mixed choir sometimes separated by gender (women and men) representing different minor roles throughout the opera: washerwomen and shepherds (act 1), dying soldiers (act 2; men only part), grape pickers (act 3), and peasants (act 4).
