= Victor Florence Pollet =

French painter (1811–1882)

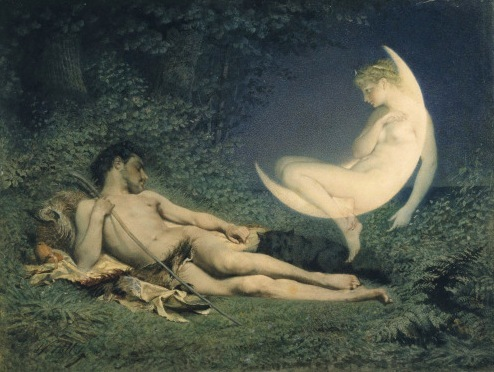
Endymion surprised in his sleep

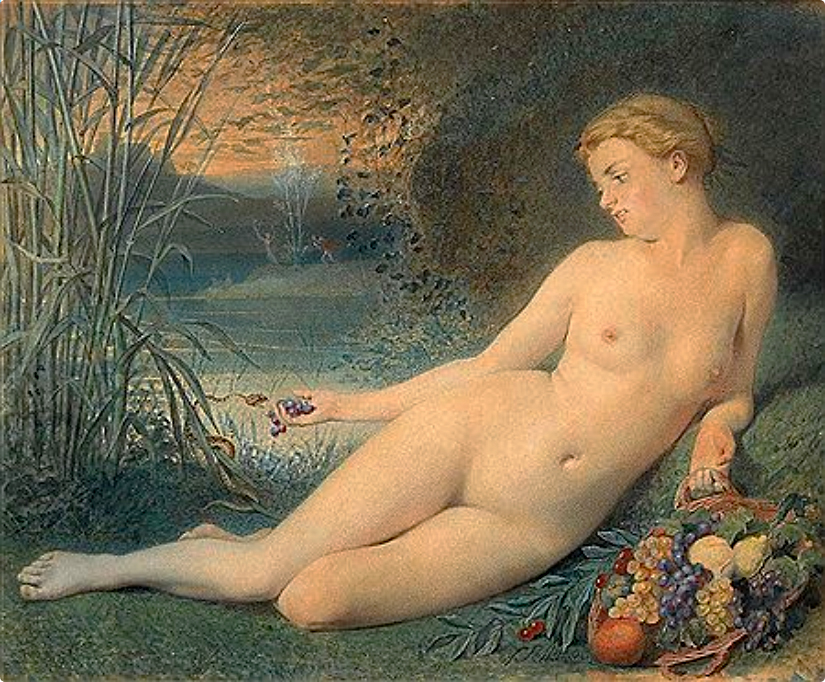
Venus and the Serpent

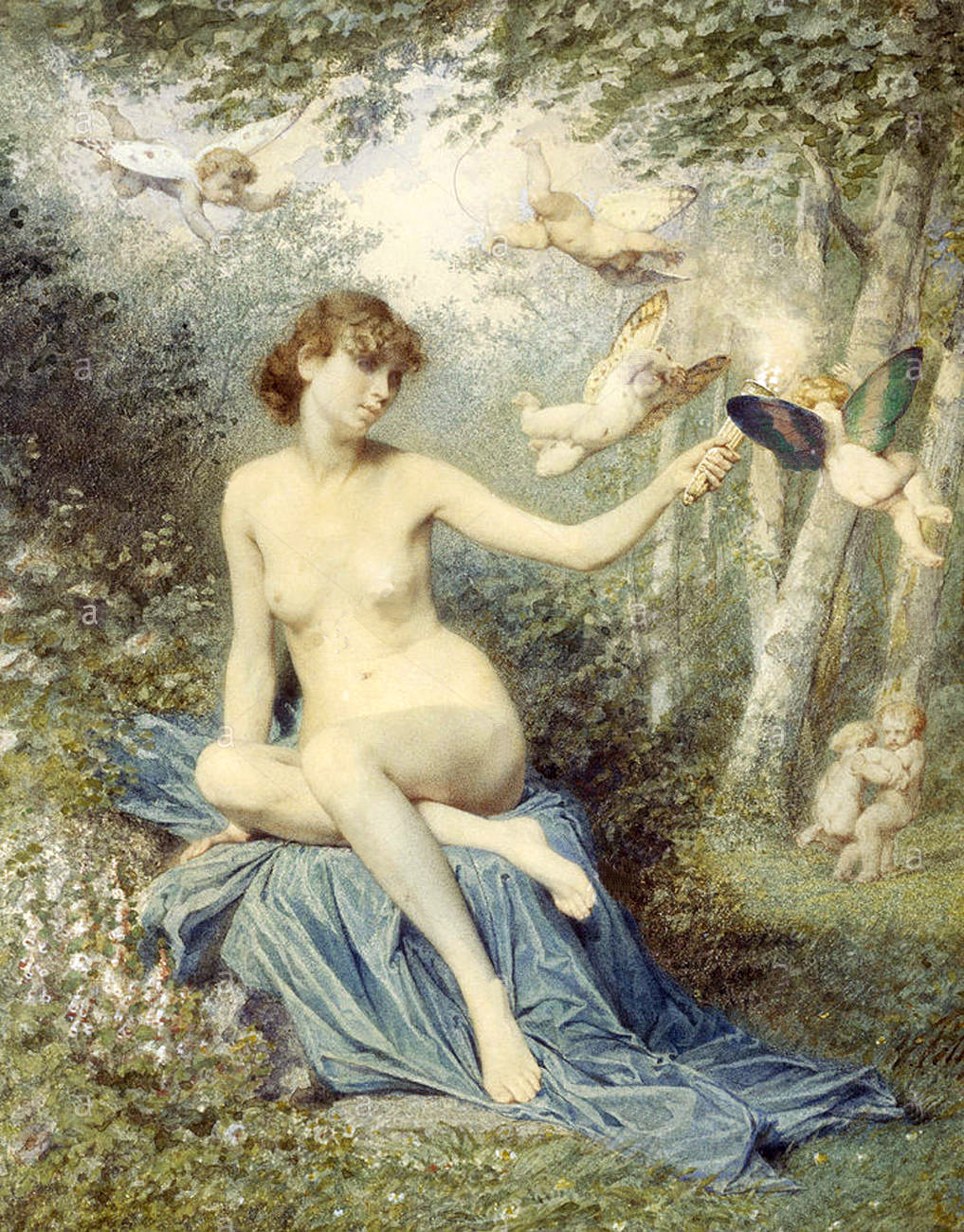
Nymph repelling Cupid with a torch

Victor Florence Pollet (1811–1882) was a French history painter, watercolourist, and burin engraver.

== Life ==
Victor Pollet was born in Paris on 22 November 1811. His brother A. Pollet was a wood engraver.

Pollet was a pupil of Paul Delaroche and Jules Richomme in Paris, and took courses at the Ecole des Beaux-Arts. He won the Grand Prix de Rome for engraving in 1838 and went to Italy and trained under Ingres. He had already made a name for himself with a few drawings and engraved vignettes after Tony Johannot, Chenavard and Émile Wattier, as well as the plates of an Imitation de Jésus-Christ ('Imitation of Jesus Christ'), published in 1836.

During his stay in Rome, he devoted himself instead to the study and to the practice of watercolour. His main works in this genre include: La Vénus ('Venus') and L'Amour profane et l'Amour sacré ('Sacred and Profane Love'), both after Titian, and La Naissance de Vénus ('The Birth of Venus'), after Ingres. According to the Grande Encyclopédie, "these watercolours are quite remarkable in breadth and colour".

Around 1849, he took up the chisel again and produced a series of engravings from famous paintings: the Jeanne d'Arc ('Joan of Arc') of Ingres, and the Bonaparte en Italie ('Bonaparte in Italy') of Raffet, among others. The Exposition Universelle of 1855 consecrated its fame. He also engraved the Mur de Salomon ('Wall of Solomon'), after Bida, in 1861.

He exhibited Lydée, a watercolour, at the Salon of 1865. His other paintings include: L'innocence ('Innocence'), 1866; La Bacchante ('The Bacchante'), 1867; La Sieste et le Bain ('The Siesta and the Bath'), 1868; Paresse ('Sloth'), 1872; and Le Songe d'une fille d'Eve ('The Dream of a Daughter of Eve'), 1873.

Pollet received several awards at the Paris Salon as a painter and engraver and was made a Chevalier of the Légion d'Honneur in 1855. He died in Mayenne, Mayenne on 11 December 1882, aged 71.

== Collections ==
- Teylers Museum: Les Papillons ('The Butterflies'), watercolour.

== Honours ==
- Chevalier of the Legion of Honour (1855)
