= Padmâvatî =

Opera by Albert Roussel

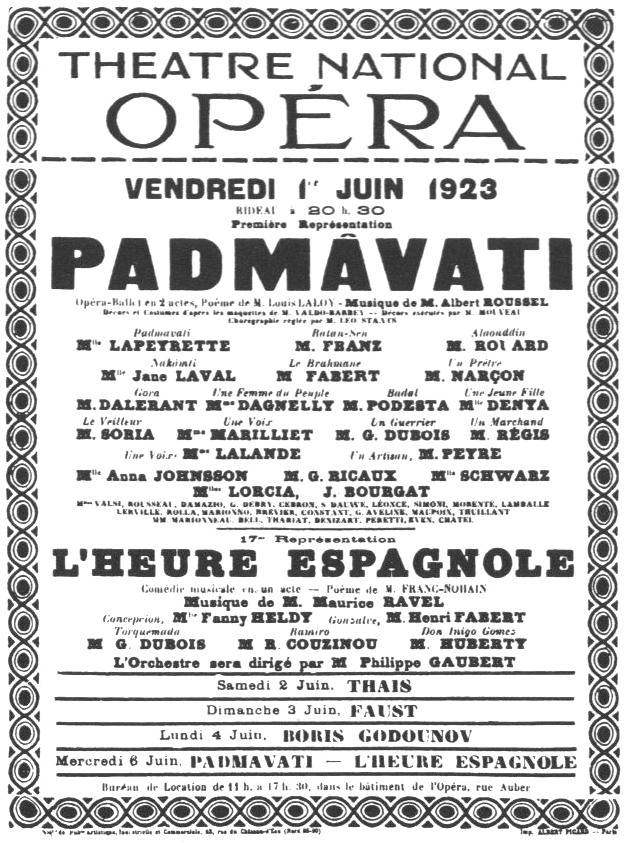
Cover of Padmâvatî

Padmâvatî is an opera in two acts by the French composer Albert Roussel. The libretto, by Louis Laloy, is based on Théodore-Marie Pavie's La légende de Padmanî, reine de Tchitor, which retells the legend recounted in Malik Muhammad Jayasi's poem Padmavat (1540). It was first performed at the Paris Opéra on June 1, 1923. Roussel styled the work an opéra-ballet and there are many dance numbers and opportunities for spectacle. The composer was inspired by his visit to the ruined city of Chittor in Rajputana (now Rajasthan) and he incorporated many features of Indian music into the score.

== Roles ==
Role	Voice type	Premiere cast, 1 June 1923 Conductor: Philippe Gaubert
Padmâvatî, Queen of Chittor	mezzo-soprano	Ketty Lapeyrette
Ratan-Sen, her husband, King of Chittor	tenor	Paul Franz
Alaouddin, Sultan of the Mughals	baritone	Édouard Roux
Nakamti, a young woman	soprano	Jeanne Laval
Brahmin	tenor	Henri Fabert
Badal, Ratan-Sen's enemy	tenor	Mario Podestà
Gora, official of the palace	tenor	Dalerant
Priest	bass	Armand-Émile Narçon

== Synopsis ==
Place: Chittor, India
Time: around 1300

=== Act One ===
The sultan of Khilji Dynasty Alaouddin is besieging the city of Chittor. He comes to its ruler, Ratan-Sen, asking for peace negotiations. Ratan-Sen shows him around the city. Alaouddin also asks to be granted a glimpse of Ratan-Sen's wife, Padmâvatî, who is legendary for her beauty. Ratan-Sen reluctantly agrees. Alaouddin refuses to make peace unless Padmâvatî is handed over to him.

=== Act Two ===
The Khilji army attack the city and Padmâvatî and the wounded Ratan-Sen take refuge in the temple of Siva. Ratan-Sen tells his wife that the people will be massacred unless she gives herself to Alaouddin. Ratan-Sen is stoned to death, and Padmâvatî joins him on his funeral pyre rather than giving herself to Alaouddin.

== Recordings ==
- Padmâvatî, Marilyn Horne, Nicolai Gedda, Jane Berbié, José van Dam, Marc Vento, Toulouse Capitole Orchestra, conducted by Michel Plasson (EMI)
- Padmâvatî, Rita Gorr (Padmâvatî), Albert Lance (Ratan-Sen), Gérard Souzay (Alaouddin). London Symphony Orchestra and BBC Chorus, conducted by Jean Martinon (Gala)

== Sources ==
- The Viking Opera Guide ed. Holden (Viking, 1993)
- Del Teatro (in Italian)
- Casaglia, Gherardo (2005)."Padmâvatî, 1 June 1923". L'Almanacco di Gherardo Casaglia (in Italian).
- The Oxford Illustrated History of Opera ed. Parker (OUP, 1994)
- Smith, Richard Langham (1992), 'Padmâvatî' in The New Grove Dictionary of Opera, ed. Stanley Sadie (London) ISBN 0-333-73432-7
