= Lisa Hilton (writer) =

British writer and historian

- Born: Liverpool, England
- Occupations: Author; historian; journalist; television presenter; consultant
- Writing career
- Language: English
- Years active: 2002 – present
- Genres: History, fiction
- Website: lisahilton.com

Lisa Hilton FRHistS is a British writer of history books, historical fiction, articles for magazines and newspapers including Vogue and The Sunday Telegraph, librettist, and as L. S. Hilton, psychological thrillers Maestra (2016), Domina (2017) and Ultima (2018). She was elected a Fellow of the Royal Historical Society in 2024.

== Television ==
In 2019 Hilton presented the two-part BBC television documentary Charles I: Downfall of a King.

== Books ==
=== Athénais: The Real Queen of France ===
Athénais: The Real Queen of France (2002) is a biography of Louis XIV's mistress Françoise-Athénaïs, marquise de Montespan. A review of this book draws parallels between her and Camilla Parker Bowles, the former mistress of King Charles III, now his wife and Queen Consort of the United Kingdom.

=== Mistress Peachum's Pleasure: The Life of Lavinia, Duchess of Bolton ===
Mistress Peachum's Pleasure (2006) is a biography of the eighteenth-century actress Lavinia Fenton, Duchess of Bolton.

=== Queens Consort: England's Medieval Queens ===
Queens Consort (2010) charts the extraordinary lives of England's medieval queens from Eleanor of Aquitaine to Elizabeth of York.

=== The House with Blue Shutters ===
The House with Blue Shutters (2010) is a novel set in southern France in World War Two and the present day.

=== The Horror of Love: Nancy Mitford and Gaston Palewski in Paris and London ===
The Horror of Love (2011) tells the story of famous English novelist and socialite Nancy Mitford's relationship with Gaston Palewski. In contrast to most biographers of Mitford, Hilton believes this relation is crucial to understanding Nancy. The Evening Standard found the style pedestrian but otherwise the book was "well-paced and informative". The Independent praised its charm in bringing Mitford's world to life. The Daily Express found it a good story, despite several minor errors. It was also reviewed by Kirkus Reviews.

=== Wolves in Winter ===
Wolves in Winter (2012) is a novel set in late 15th-century Italy. The central character, Mura, is sold as a slave aged 5, and eventually finds herself in the Florentine court. Red called it a "richly detailed page-turner" and compared it to Philippa Gregory.

=== Elizabeth: Renaissance Prince - A Biography ===
Elizabeth: Renaissance Prince (2014) provides new insights into one of England's greatest monarchs. It uses new research in France, Italy, Russia and Turkey to present a fresh interpretation of Elizabeth as a queen who saw herself primarily as a Renaissance prince, delivering a very different perspective on Elizabeth's emotional and sexual life, and upon her attempts to mould England into a European state. Elizabeth I was not an exceptional woman but an exceptional ruler: Hilton redraws English history with this animated portrait of an astounding life. Her biography maps Elizabeth's dramatic journey from a timid, newly crowned queen to one of England's most successful monarchs. The Independent praised it as 'an impressive balancing act; while eruditely analysing Renaissance ideas and Elizabethan realpolitik it retains all the sexiness we have come to expect from books about the Tudors. ... Hilton is particularly good at describing how Elizabeth created an immediately recognisable image and then presented it through portraits rich in allegory.' It is dedicated to her daughter.

=== The Stolen Queen ===
The Stolen Queen (2015) is an historical novel set in 1199 amid the backdrop of the great political struggles of medieval Europe.

=== Fiction published as L. S. Hilton ===
As L. S. Hilton, she is the author of psychological thriller Maestra, the first of a trilogy published by Bonnier Zaffre, G. P. Putnam's Sons, and 42 other publishers worldwide in 2016. Sony Pictures acquired the novel's film rights prior to publication: Amy Pascal is scheduled to produce the film through her Pascal Pictures production company, with the screenplay written by Erin Cressida Wilson. In June 2016 Hilton was named as Glamour Magazine's 'Writer of the Year' for Maestra. Domina, the sequel to Maestra, was published in April 2017. Ultima, the Trilogy's conclusion, was published in April 2018.

== Librettist ==
As an opera librettist, Hilton has written Love Hurts, with music by Nicola Moro. The opera received its first performance in Milan at the Piccolo Teatro on 25 June 2016, conducted by James Ross, with its US premiere in New York City, at Symphony Space, in October 2016.

== Journalism ==
Hilton has written for The Spectator, The Times Literary Supplement, Literary Review, Vogue, Tatler, Elle, The Royal Academy Magazine, The Daily Beast, The Evening Standard, The Observer, The Independent and The Daily Telegraph. She writes a monthly restaurant column for the British cultural and political affairs magazine Standpoint.

== Personal life ==
Lisa Hilton was born in December 1974 in Liverpool to parents who worked in education, as teachers of English and French, and Sociology respectively. She studied English at New College, Oxford, then history of art in France and Italy. She spent a short time working as an intern for Christie's auction house. Hilton has been married three times. With husband Nicola Moro, an Italian composer, she had a daughter, Ottavia; they have since divorced.

In 2023, Hilton accused Taki Theodoracopulos of attempting to rape her in 2009. He was convicted, and given a 12 month suspended sentence, which he appealed, vociferously denying the charge.

== Bibliography ==
=== Non-fiction ===
- Athenais: The Life of Louis XIV's Mistress, the Real Queen of France (2002)
- Mistress Peachum's Pleasure: The Life of Lavinia, Duchess of Bolton (2005)
- Queens Consort: England's Medieval Queens (2008)
- The Horror of Love: Nancy Mitford and Gaston Palewski in Paris and London (2011)
- Elizabeth: Renaissance Prince - A Biography (2014)

=== Fiction ===
- The House with the Blue Shutters (2010)
- Wolves in Winter (2012)
- The Stolen Queen (2015)

==== As L. S. Hilton ====
- Maestra (2016)
- Domina (2017)
- Ultima (2018)

== Filmography ==
List of television credits
Year(s)	Title	Channel	Role	Notes
2010	Vampires, Why They Bite	BBC Three	Author, presenter	
2010	Glamour Puds	Channel 4	Self	Season 2, episode 2
2011	The Great British Bake Off	BBC Two	Self	Episode: "Patisserie"
2011	Giles and Sue's Royal Wedding	BBC Two		
2011	Versailles: Dream of a King	Brook Lapping	Co-author, appearance	
2012	Red Hot History	Proper Television	Principal contributor	
2012	Tendres Rivales	Arte	Co-author, presenter	French
2012	Chateau Chunder: A Wine Revolution	ABC1	Self	
2013	The Real White Queen and Her Rivals	BBC Two	Contributor	
2013	Museum Secrets	Kensington TV	Principal contributor	
2014	The Royals	back2back	Principal contributor	
2016	Bloody Queens: Elizabeth and Mary	BBC Two	Advisor, appearance	
2017	Elizabeth I's Secret Agents	72 Films	Scriptwriter, presenter	Won: Royal Television Society Award (History); Nominated: BAFTA (Specialist Factual)
2017	Inside...	Channel 5		Episodes: "Kensington Palace", "Westminster Abbey"
2019	Charles I: Downfall of a King	BBC Four	Series presenter	
2020	Charles I: Killing a King	BBC Four	Series presenter	
2021	Royal Bastards: Rise of the Tudors	72 Films	Consultant expert	
2022	Secrets of the Royal Palaces	Channel 5	Presenter	Season 2
