= Maestra (novel) =

Book by Lisa Hilton

- Cover for the Zaffre Publishing edition
- Author: L.S. Hilton
- Audio read by: Emilia Fox
- Language: English
- Published: 2016
- Publisher: Zaffre Publishing, G.P. Putnam's Sons
- Publication place: United Kingdom
- Media type: Print (hardback, paperback), e-book, audiobook
- Pages: 352 pages (UK edition)
- ISBN: 1785760033 (UK)

Maestra is a 2016 erotic thriller novel by L.S. Hilton, the penname of British author Lisa Hilton, and the first book in a trilogy consisting of Maestra (2016), Domina (2017) and Ultima (2018). The book was first published in the United Kingdom on 10 March 2016 through Zaffre Publishing and was released in the United States on 19 April of the same year, through G.P. Putnam's Sons, who also re-released Maestra in the UK.

Maestra has received comparisons to E. L. James's popular Fifty Shades trilogy, and Hilton received a three-book deal and a prospective film based on Maestra's first draft. Sales for Maestra have been strong and the work has reached bestselling status in the United Kingdom.

Of the book, Hilton has stated that "My novel doesn't set out to provoke, nor is it precisely a feminist polemic – I merely attempted to write about a modern female character who is unapologetic about desire and who feels no shame or conflict about its fulfilment."

== Synopsis ==
Eager to leave behind her poor and mostly unhappy childhood, Judith Rashleigh has moved to London in the hopes of reinventing herself. She has taken a job as an assistant at an elite art auction house, but this job only barely allows her to pay her bills and the majority of her coworkers treat her with disdain. Her boss Rupert is the most dismissive of her co-workers, and he has no problem sending her to a client that fully expected Judith to have sex with him in exchange for selling his paintings through the auction house. It is after this last act that Judith meets up with an old acquaintance named Leanne, who introduces her to the a hostess bar where its women serve as non-sexual companions to wealthy clients. The pay from this job is quite good and allows Judith to make ends meet. Through this job she meets James, an obese older man who proves to be her most lucrative customer. One day Judith discovers that the auction house is slated to sell a rare painting by George Stubbs, however she is savvy enough to spot that the painting is likely to be a fake. When her investigations prove this to be true, Judith is promptly fired from the art house by Rupert. This pains her, as she truly loved art and wanted to succeed at her job.

Disheartened and eager to leave town, Judith persuades James to take her and Leanne to France in exchange for sexual favours. Leanne comes up with the idea of drugging James in order to have more time to explore and play in France on their own, only for this to backfire and end in James's death. The two women manage to make it appear as though James died of natural causes and Leanne goes back to England while Judith remains in France. Using money she took from James's wallet, Judith travels throughout Europe and seduces various men, giving the impression that she had a wealthier and more cultured background than she actually possesses. Eventually Judith comes across the same Stubbs painting and realizes that the forgery's appearance at the auction house was part of a larger scam to sell the painting for millions of dollars to Alonso Moncado, a vicious mafioso who specializes in forged paintings. She manages to trick the seller, Cameron Fitzpatrick, into going to a secluded location with her, where she murders him in order to gain access to his personal effects, which tell her when and where the sale will occur. Judith then goes in his place to a meeting point in Italy, passing herself off as his assistant and manages to sell the painting and quickly transfer the funds into a private account she had set up earlier.

Although she is now very wealthy and living in France, Judith remains concerned that Rupert and Moncado will detect her duplicity and come after her for retribution, despite attempts to further hide her actions by moving the money once more. She is also fearful that the police will discover her part in Cameron's murder. Judith grows increasingly nervous when she finds that she is being followed. Her friend Leanne reappears and states that she was sent there by Rupert, which results in Judith murdering her and making it appear as if she overdosed. Judith meets up with her follower, who is revealed to be Renaud, hired by a former client of Moncado's that was upset that he was sold a fake. The two team up in order to allow Cambon access to Moncado and they manage to trick Moncado into meeting Judith under the premise of selling him a painting. Judith brings Moncado back to an apartment where he is swiftly killed by Renaud, who instructs her to take any evidence that could link them to Moncado's murder and all of the man's personal effects. Afterwards Judith murders Renaud and carefully disposes of his body. Through more investigating she finds that Renaud intended to trick her into getting arrested for her past crimes as part of a police sting and that his plans to murder Moncado were part of a revenge plot. Judith then attends a sex party at a club in order to steal another woman's ID card. Before she can leave she is confronted by the club's owner. She murders him and flees to San Giorgio Maggiore, where she encounters Rupert, who does not recognize her. She invites him to attend the opening at her new gallery before leaving him to attend a prestigious party.

== Development ==
Hilton initially began writing Maestra at the behest of Georgina Capel, her agent at the time, a move that she believes was due to the popularity of Fifty Shades of Grey. The agent disliked the initial draft and Hilton abandoned the idea until years later when she decided to revisit the draft and combine it with a manuscript she wrote while working at an auction house in London. She submitted the finished product to her agent, who disliked the new manuscript as well, and to various publishing houses, where it was repeatedly rejected. Hilton briefly considered self-publishing and gave a copy of the manuscript to a restaurant owning friend, who brought it to the attention of Zaffre Publishing, who ended up purchasing the book rights and became her new agent.

While writing Maestra, Hilton chose not to include any physical descriptions of Judith as she wanted readers to project their own opinions and ideas upon the character. She also did not set out to write Judith as a feminist character, rather a representation of the "anger of the millennial generation", as they've "been born into this economically advanced culture, and they’ve been fed an idea that they just need to work hard and develop their brand on Instagram and everything will work out, but no matter how hard they try, they can’t get ahead."

== Film adaptation ==
Film rights to Maestra were acquired prior to its publication in March 2016. Sony Pictures expressed interest in purchasing the film rights, with former Sony Pictures chief Amy Pascal to produce the movie through her Pascal Pictures production company. Erin Cressida Wilson has been brought in to write the screenplay. Hilton and Pascal have expressed interest in an unknown actress performing as Judith and for the character's victims to be played by well-known actors.

== Reception ==
Maestra has received some mixed reception for its sexual themes, receiving praise from media outlets such as the Washington Post while others like the New York Times felt that the erotic scenes felt too repetitive and obligatory. The Guardian also felt that the erotica suffered from the "law of diminishing returns", but also wrote that its art history was well written and researched and that "through Artemisia Gentileschi's painting Judith Slaying Holofernes, Hilton offers a sly mirror of her antiheroine and namesake's progress."

Hilton has expressed frustration over reviews that predominantly focus on the book's sexual themes, writing in an article for The Guardian that "Women can contain multitudes, too, and a conversation about sex on the page obviously doesn't preclude the ability to discuss anything else."

== Sequel ==
Domina, the second novel in the Maestra series, was published in April 2017.

Ultima, the third novel in the Maestra series, was published in 2018.
