= Naïs Micoulin =

Opera by Alfred Bruneau

Naïs Micoulin is a 1907 drame lyrique by Alfred Bruneau to a libretto after the 1884 novel by Émile Zola.
