= André Beaunier =

French novelist and literary critic (1869–1925)

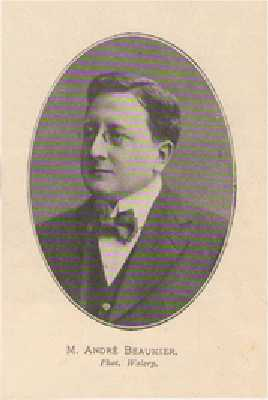
Beaunier

André Beaunier (22 September 1869, Évreux – 9 December 1925, Paris) was a French novelist and literary critic.

== Life ==
The son of an avoué in Évreux, Beaunier entered the École normale supérieure in 1890.

He was the literary reviewer for the Revue des deux Mondes in 1912 then editor and drama critic for l'Écho de Paris in 1916. During the 1920s he lived in Le Vésinet.

In 1908 he married opera singer Jeanne Raunay. He died suddenly in December 1925.

== Works ==
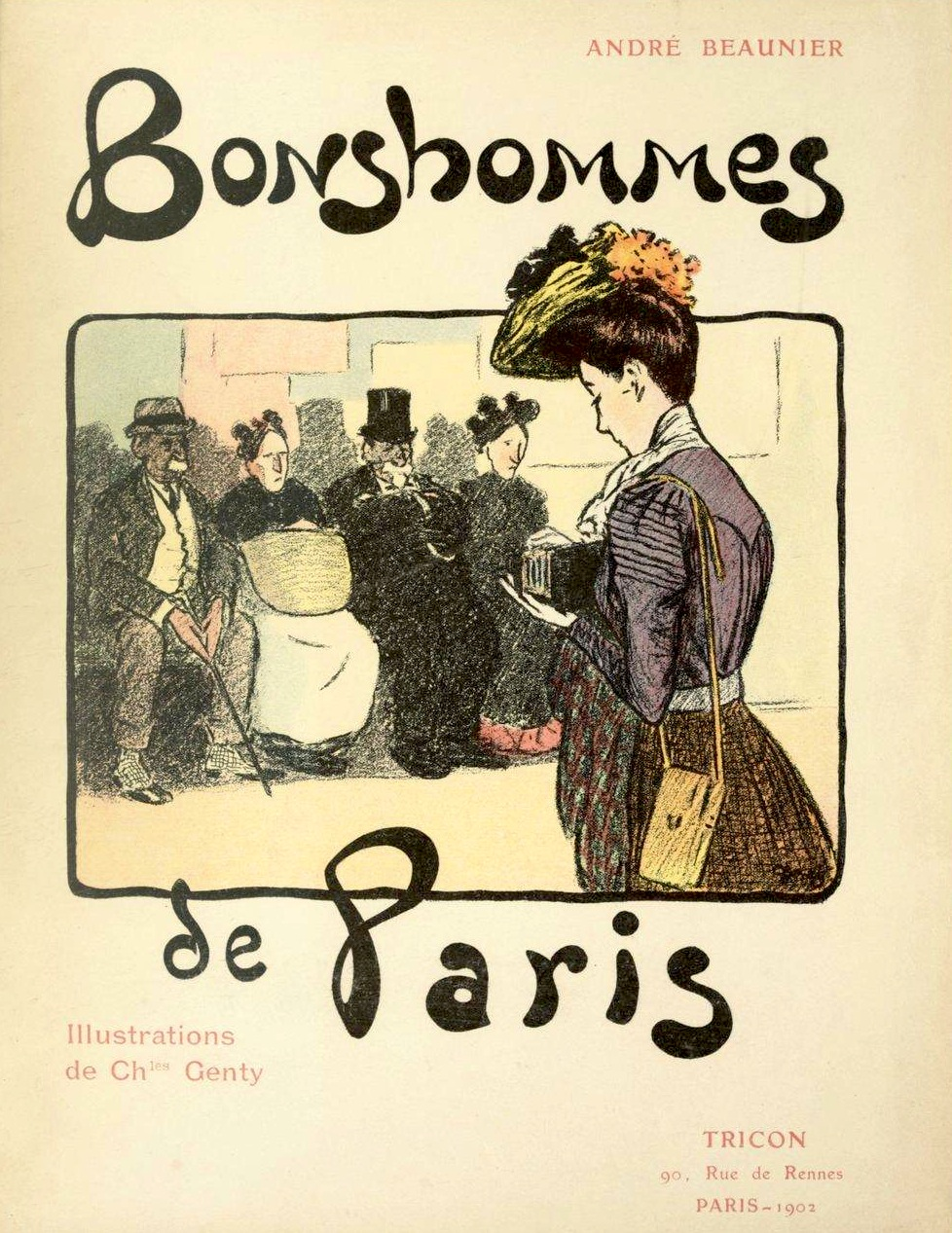
Illustration by Charles Genty on the front cover of Beaunier's work Bonshommes de Paris.

- Les Dupont-Leterrier, Paris, 1900
- La Poésie nouvelle, Paris, 1902
- Bonshommes de Paris, Paris, 1902
- L'Art de regarder les tableaux, Émile Lévy, Paris, 1906
- Éloges, Paris, 1909
- Les Idées et les Hommes, Plon-Nourrit, Paris
- Les Limites du cœur, Fasquelle, Paris, 1910
- Les Carnets de Joseph Joubert
- La Crise, three-act comedy, co-written with Paul Bourget (Premiered at Théâtre de la Porte Saint-Martin, 3 May 1912)
- Suzanne et le plaisir, 1921
