= James Ross (conductor) =

British conductor and author

James Ross is a British conductor and author.

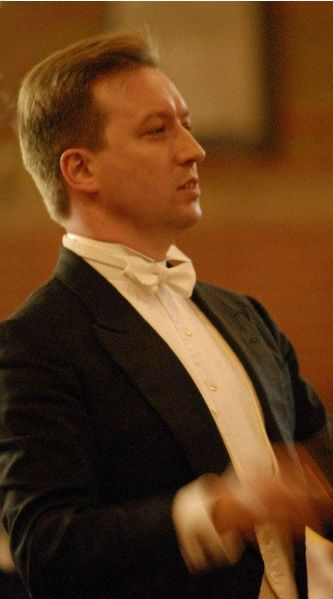
James Ross (conductor)

== Career ==
Ross studied at Harrow School, and later at Christ Church, Oxford from where he received an MA in Modern History (1993), an MSt in Music (1994), and a DPhil in French opera (1998) awarded the Donald Tovey Prize. He studied with conductors including Sir Charles Mackerras, Ernst Schelle, Victor Feldbrill and Alan Hazeldine, and was a finalist in the 1998 BBC Philharmonic Conducting Competition.

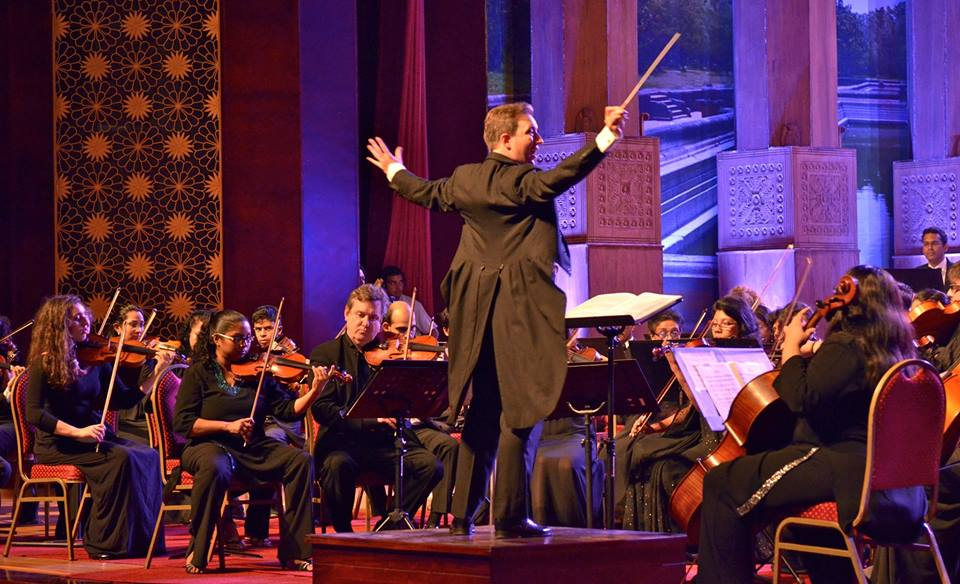
James Ross conducting the first orchestral concert at Nelum Pokuna Theatre, Colombo, with The Commonwealth Festival Orchestra and Symphony Orchestra of Sri Lanka

Since graduating he has conducted over 1,500 works in 20 countries throughout Western and Eastern Europe, North America, Africa and Asia, and in Westminster Abbey and leading UK concert halls including the Royal Festival Hall and St. John's, Smith Square, London, Symphony Hall, Birmingham and the Sheldonian Theatre, Oxford, where he performed Beethoven's 9th Symphony for the 350th anniversary in 2014. In 2013 he gave the first orchestral concert at Sri Lanka's new national performing arts venue, the Nelum Pokuna Theatre, Colombo, with the Commonwealth Festival Orchestra. He was music director of the Oxford Opera Company and the Christ Church Festival Orchestra. Since 2006 he has been music director of the Sidcup Symphony Orchestra and since 2020, artistic director of Kent Sinfonia. Other previous positions include with Oxford University Sinfonietta and St Albans Symphony Orchestra. In 2021, he conducted the Ankara City Philharmonic Orchestra (Ankara Kent Filarmoni Orkestrası)'s first concert, held at Ankara's new Presidential Symphony Orchestra Hall. His album 'Royal Throne of Kings', of previously unrecorded works by Vaughan Williams for Shakespeare plays with Kent Sinfonia, released with Albion Records on 1 November 2024.

Ross has conducted numerous first performances of new works, including by composers such as Tunde Jegede, Philip Sheppard and Geoffrey Álvarez, at London's Saatchi Gallery, and for Queen Elizabeth II on Commonwealth Day at Westminster Abbey. In June 2016 he gave the first performance of the opera Love Hurts, composed by Nicola Moro with libretto by Lisa Hilton, at Milan's Piccolo Teatro. Ross is also a director of global classical music production company and consultancy Ulysses Arts.

== Publications ==
James Ross has co-written several books and articles on music, including Music in the French Salon, French Music Since Berlioz, Vincent d'Indy l'interprète, and Messidor: Republican Patriotism and the French Revolutionary Tradition in Third Republic Opera. His work has also been published in journals including The English Historical Review, Opera, The Musical Times and Music & Letters.

== Bibliography ==
- Ross, James, 'Musical Performance in Post-Conflict Societies: Collaboration, Reconciliation and Community Cohesion', Defence Review, Institute of National Security Studies Sri Lanka (Volume II, July 2018). pp. 38–55.
- Ross, James, Vincent d'Indy l'interprète in Vincent d'Indy et son temps, edited by Manuela Schwartz; Sprimont, Mardaga (2006) ISBN 2-87009-888-X
- Ross, James, 'Music in the French Salon', in French Music Since Berlioz, edited by Richard Langham Smith and Caroline Potter; Ashgate Press (2006) ISBN 0-7546-0282-6
- Ross, James (2008) Messidor: Republican Patriotism and the French Revolutionary Tradition in Third Republic Opera in Music, Culture and National Identity in France, 1870–1939, edited by Barbara Kelly; University of Rochester Press. ISBN 978-1-58046-272-3
- Ross, James, 'D’Indy's Fervaal: Reconstructing French Identity at the Fin-de-Siècle’, Music & Letters 84/2 (May 2003), pp. 209–40.
- Ross, James, Music & Letters and Opera
