= Manuela Schwartz =

German woman musicologist

Manuela Schwartz (born in 1964) is a German musicologist, cultural historian and rector of a University of Applied Sciences.

== Life ==
Schwartz was born in Pirmasens. She completed her master's degree in musicology, history and German studies at the Johannes Gutenberg University Mainz and Technische Universität Berlin. After completing her doctorate in 1995 at Technische Universität Berlin (Summa cum laude), she worked at the State Institute for Music Research (Prussian Cultural Heritage Foundation Berlin); in 1996 she joined the DFG-Project Music in Exile 1933-1949: Pilot Project California at the Folkwang University of the Arts as a research assistant in Essen (cond. Horst Weber). Since 2000 she has been Professor of Historical Musicology at the [[Hochschule Magdeburg-Stendal]].

Schwartz publishes on a wide range of topics from the 19th and 20th centuries. She was a member of the German-French research network La vie musicale sous Vichy (Ltg. Myriam Chimenes, 1992–1999) as well as in the DFG network Hörwissen im Wandel (2013-2017). Her publications include studies in the history of the exile from Europe during the National Socialism (Quellen zur Geschichte emigrierter Musiker 1933–1950, Band 1 Kalifornien, edited with Horst Weber) and letter editions (correspondence with [[Hermann Pfrogner]] and Hans Heinrich Engel) as well as research on the reception of Richard Wagner's work in France, the relationship between music and politics in occupied France 1940–1944, the history and culture of European music therapy in the 19th, 20th and 21st centuries, and biographical studies (Vincent d’Indy, Heinrich Strobel and Conrad Ansorge). Since autumn 2017 she has been co-editor of the series Schriften zur politischen Musikgeschichte at Vandenhoeck & Ruprecht.

On March 23, 2022, she was elected Rector of Magdeburg-Stendal University of Applied Sciences by the Academic Senate, effective May 17, 2022. Since 2021, she has been an honorary professor at the University of Montreal (Université de Montréal) in Quebec (Canada) and Dean of the Department of Social Work, Health and Media. She has also been chairwoman of the Richard Wagner Association in Magdeburg since 2021 and a (Catholic) member of the Protestant University Advisory Board. Since May 2022, Manuela Schwartz is the project leader of the German Jordanian University (GJU)http://www.gju.edu.jo/content/about-gju-687 under the governance of the DAAD and the Federal Ministry of Education and Research.

== Publications ==
- Wagner-Rezeption und französische Oper des Fin de Siècle. Untersuchungen zu Vincent d’Indys Fervaal. (Berliner Musik Studien. 10) Studiopunkt Verlag, Sinzig 1999, ISBN 3-89564-053-0 (Zugl.: Berlin, Techn. Univ., Diss., 1995).
- with Stefan Keym (ed.): Pluralismus wider Willen? Stilistische Tendenzen in der Musik Vincent d’Indys. Olms, Hildesheim 2002, ISBN 3-487-11722-3.
- with Horst Weber (ed.): Quellen zur Geschichte emigrierter Musiker 1933–1950. Vol. 1: Kalifornien. K. G. Saur, Munich 2003, ISBN 3-598-23746-4, as eBook ISBN 978-3-11-095143-1.
- as ed.: Vincent d’Indy et son temps. Mardaga, Sprimont 2006, ISBN 2-87009-888-X.
- with Sabine Meine (ed.): Der Musiksalon. Beiträge des Symposiums "Salons des späten 19. und frühen 20. Jahrhunderts – Räume für Musik in Großstädten Europas und Amerikas", organisiert im Rahmen der Jahrestagung der Gesellschaft für Musikforschung, Leipzig 2008. In Die Tonkunst, 2010/1, ISSN 1863-3536, pp. 3–67 (with contributions by Sabine Meine, Manuela Schwartz, Inga Mai-Groote, Horst Weber, Myriam Chimènes and a preface by Beatrix Borchard; Inhalt und Leseprobe online).
- with Eike Rathgeber, Christian Heitler (ed.): Conrad Ansorge. Ein Pianist des Fin de Siècle in Berlin und Wien.. Böhlau, Viena/Cologne/Weimar 2017, ISBN 978-3-205-20307-0.
