= Jan Blockx =

Belgian composer, pianist and teacher

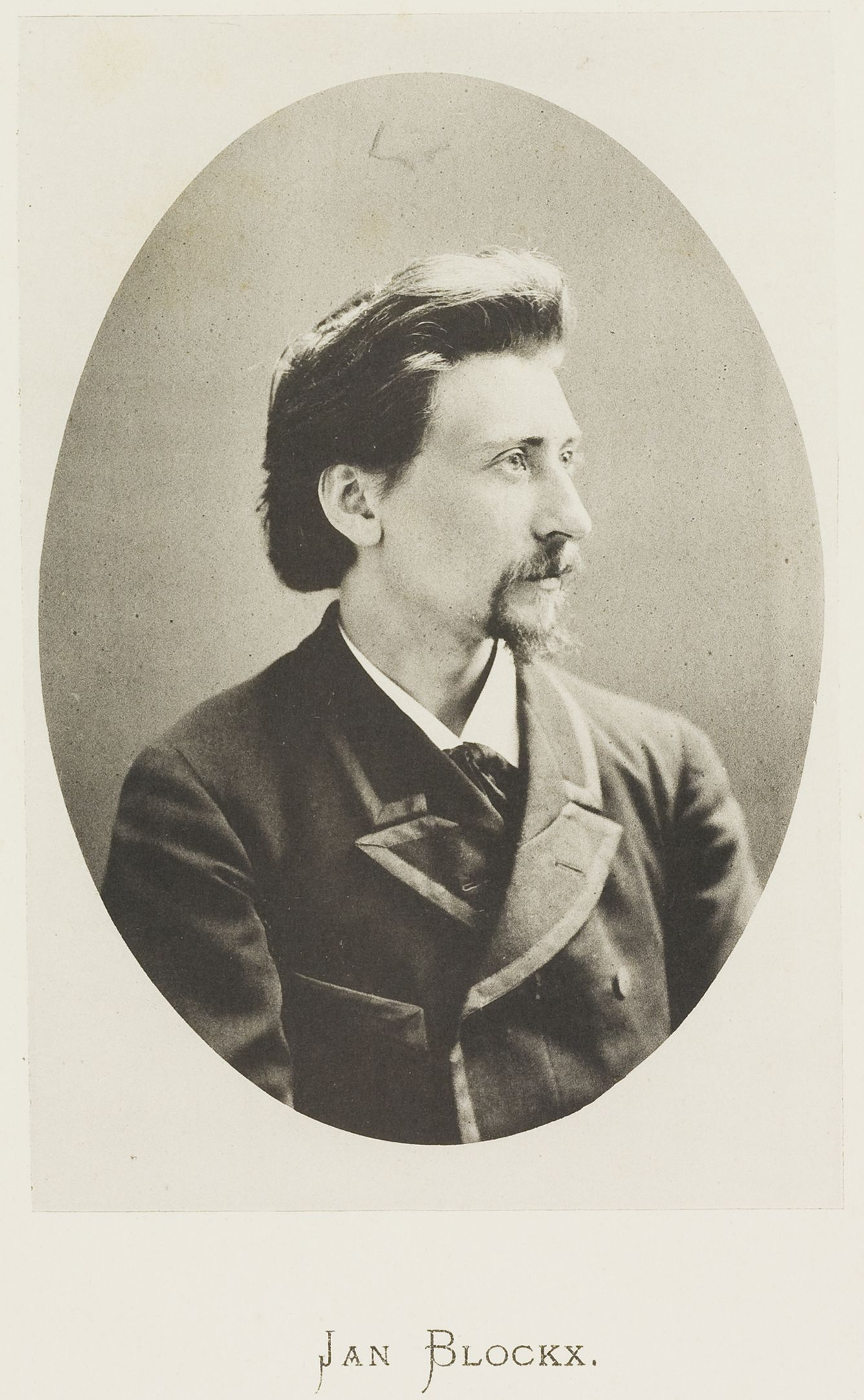
Jan Blockx

Jan Blockx (25 January 1851 – 26 May 1912) was a Belgian composer, pianist and teacher. He was a leader of the Flemish nationalist school in music.

== Biography ==
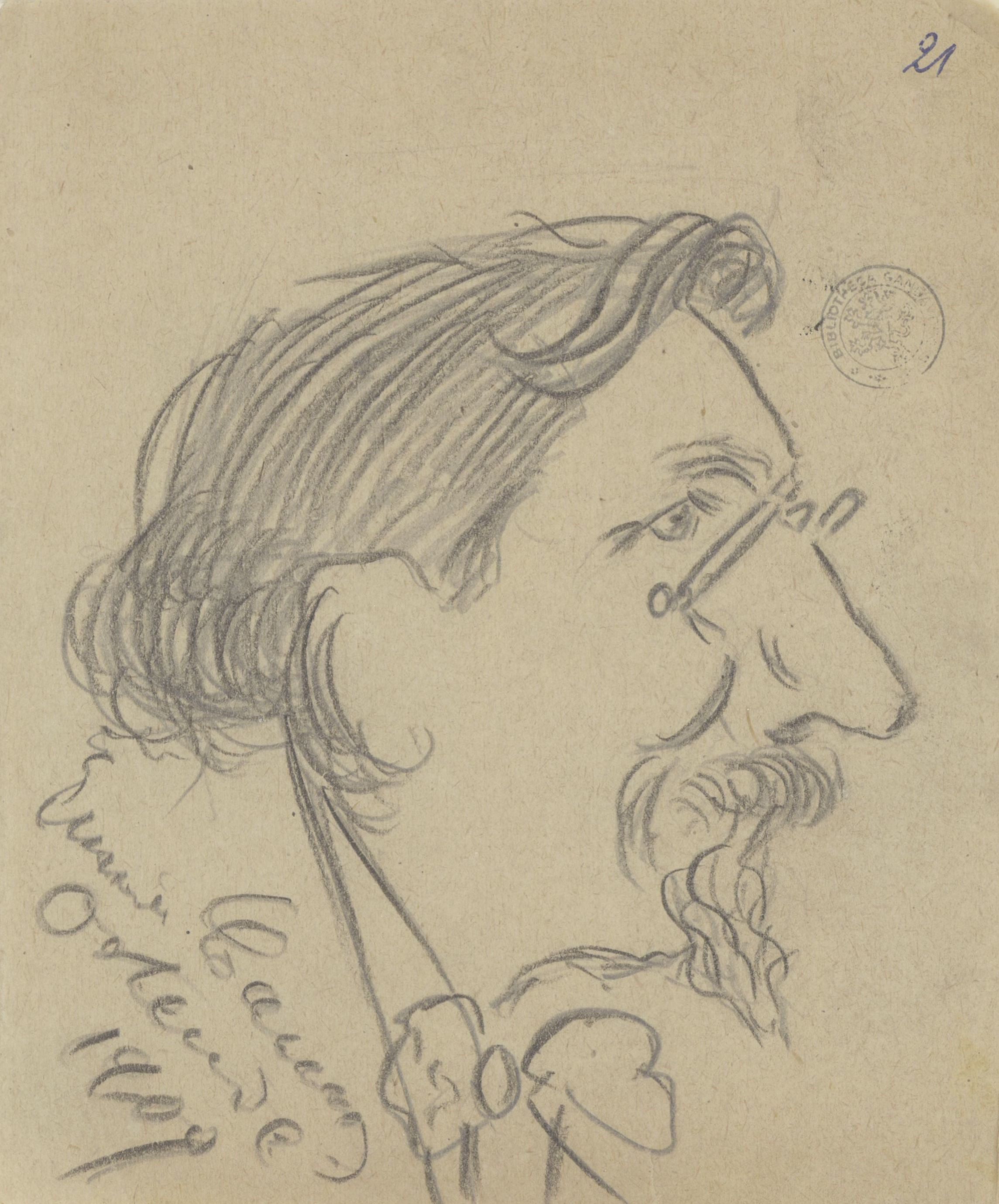
Portrait of Jan Blockx drawn by Enrico Caruso (1909, Ghent University Library)

Born in Antwerp, Blockx studied the piano with Frans Aerts, the organ with Joseph Callaerts and composition with Peter Benoît at the Antwerp Conservatory. When he was still a student he wrote some songs, in Flemish, which became popular. However, his musical education studies were quite irregular, and he was essentially self-taught. Later he studied with Carl Reinecke at Leipzig. Despite the fact that he was Benoit's favorite pupil, Blockx wanted to make his own way in life, independent of his teacher and the Flemish Movement. Unlike Benoit, Blockx never intended his works to have the educational, uplifting effect that was typical for the Flemish Movement.

This caused tensions between student and master: despite the fact that Blockx's work helped to spread Flemish music across the Belgian borders and even saved the Vlaamse Opera from bankruptcy, Blockx received a lot of complaints from his fellow Flemish composers for publishing his works in French and through the Parisian music publisher Heugel.

In 1886 Blockx became a teacher at his Antwerp alma mater and when Benoît died in 1901, Blockx succeeded him as director (a decision that was much contested by his colleagues despite his international reputation). He died of a stroke in Kapellenbos, near Antwerp, in 1912.

== Works ==
Opera
Iets Vergeten (Forgot something)- Libretto: Victor Alexis dela Montagne. World premiere in Nederlandsch Lyrisch Toneel in Antwerp in 1877
Thyl Uylenspiegel - performed for the first time in Brussels on 18 January 1900. The three-act opera is set during the Dutch revolt against the Spaniards between 1568 and 1573. It includes Flemish folk dances.
Maître Martin - Libretto: Eugène Landoy and Ernst Theodor Amadeus Hoffmann. World premiere in Théâtre-Royal de la Monnaie in 1892
Rita - Libretto: Nestor de Tiere. World premiere in Vlaamse Opera in Antwerp in 1895.
De Herbergprinses (The Inn Princess) - Libretto: Nestor de Tière. World première in Nederlandsch Lyrisch Toneel in Antwerp on 18 October 1896
De Bruid der Zee (The Bride of the Sea) - Libretto: Nestor de Tière. World premiere in Vlaamse Opera in Antwerp on 30 November 1901.
De Kapel (The Chapel) - Libretto: Nestor de Tière. One-act opera. World premiere in Vlaamse Opera in Antwerp on 7 November 1903.
Baldie - Libretto: Nestor de Tière. World premiere in Vlaamse Opera in Antwerp on 25 January 1908.Later he rewrote Baldie and called it Liefdelied (premiere 6 January 1912).

Ballet
Milenka

Pantomime
St Nicholas

Overture
Rubens and many other works.

Cantatas
Jubelgam
De Klokke Roelandt (The Clock Roelandt)
Het Vaderland (The Fatherland)
Die Scheldezang (Those Scold Singing)
Feest in der Lande (Party in the Country)
Vredesang (Peace)
Op den Stroom (On the Streem)
Het Droom van't Paradies (The Dream of Paradies)

Symphonic poems
Kermisdag (Fun Fair Day)
Symfonisch Drieluik (Symphonic Trilogy).
