= Jacques Joseph Coiny =

French engraver (1761–1809)

Jacques-Joseph, Jacques Joseph or Joseph Coiny (19 March 1761 – 28 May 1809) was a French engraver.

== The Aretin or Collection of Erotic Postures ==
His best-known work remains his 20 engravings of erotic poses for Augustine Carracci's The Aretin or Collection of Erotic Postures, published by Pierre Didot in Paris in 1798.

Its title refers to the supposed but impossible collaboration between Agostino Carracci (1557–1602) and Pietro Aretino (1492–1556) on a collection of erotic images and verse entitled I Modi, but it was not based on their work.

Instead, Coiny's works seem to have been inspired by the erotic poses in 'The Loves of the Gods' executed in Antwerp at the start of the 17th century in burin by Pieter de Jode I (1570–1634). This theory is one of at least two theories that each describe what images Augustine Carracci's The Aretin or Collection of Erotic Postures was based on. In effect, Coiny seems to have had a set of six anonymous prints, but it is difficult to say precisely which.

"L'Arétin" in the title probably does not specifically refer to Pietro Aretino and his original poems for I Modi – by the mid 17th century, an "Arétin" referred to any work reproducing pornography using mythological scenes.

== Other works and pupils ==
Coiny's other works include engravings of battle paintings by Louis-François Lejeune. His pupils included Théodore Richomme and his son Joseph Coiny won the Prix de Rome for engraving in 1816.
