= Joseph Coiny =

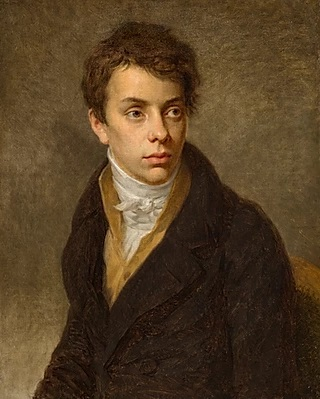
Joseph Coiny

Joseph Coiny (1795, Paris-1829) was a French engraver. He was the son of the engraver Jacques Joseph Coiny. He won the Prix de Rome for engraving in 1816.

== Biography ==
Joseph Coiny was born on September 3, 1795, in Paris. He was the son of engraver Jacques Joseph Coiny, with whom he began his studies, before becoming a pupil of François-Louis Gounod and Bervic.

He won the Prix de Rome in engraving in 1816.

Among his works are The Creation of Eve, based on Michelangelo, and numerous portraits.

Joseph Coiny died on August 1, 1829, in his hometown.

== External references ==
- BNF: Œuvre de Joseph Coiny
- Artprice.com: Joseph COINY (1795-1829)
