= Le Jardin du Paris =

Le Jardin du Paradis is an opera in four acts by Alfred Bruneau to a libretto by Robert de Fiers and Gaston Arman de Caillavet after Hans Christian Andersen. It premiered at the Opéra de Paris 29 October 1923 and ran for 27 performances.
