= L'Ouragan (opera) =

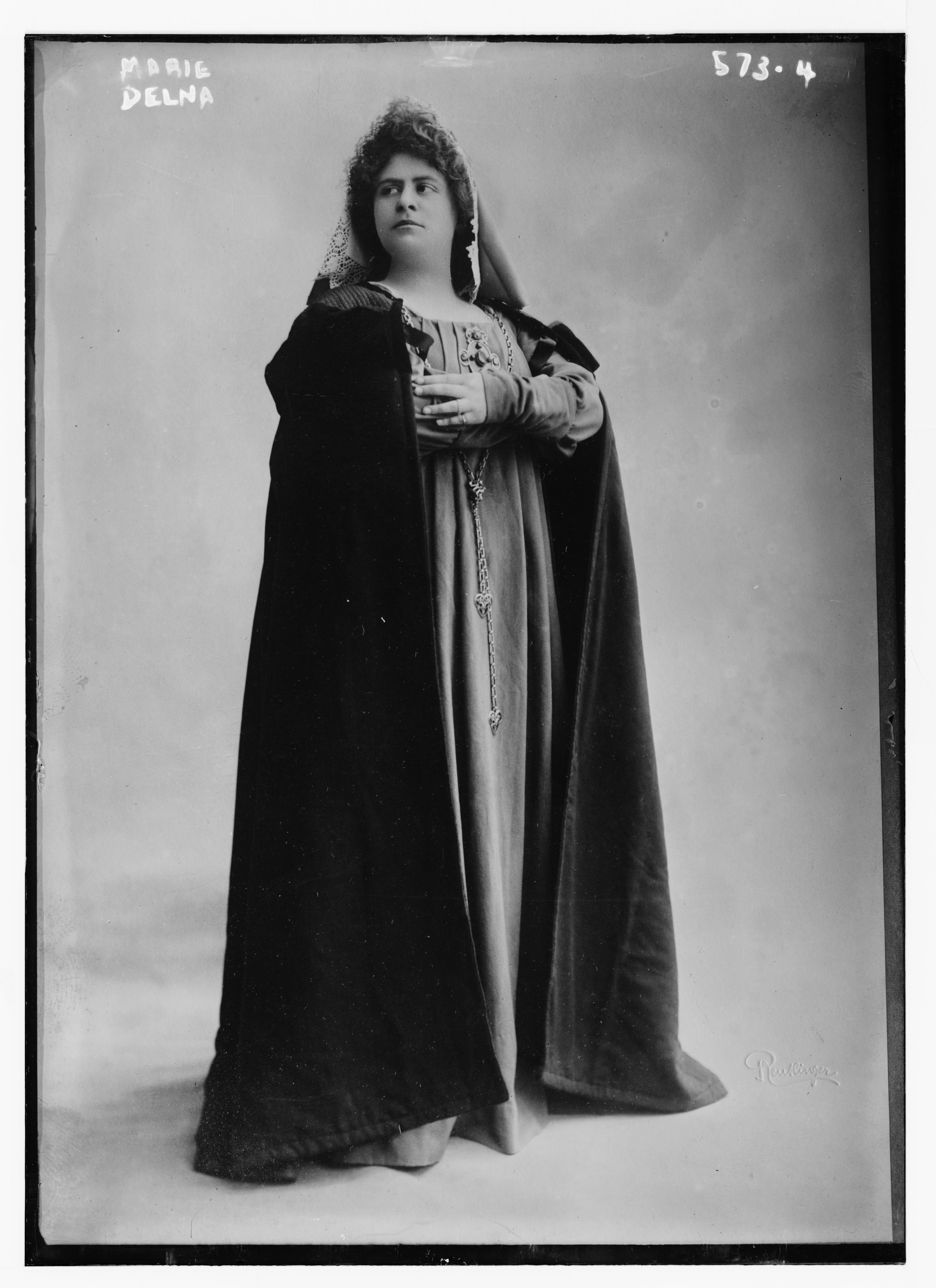
Marie Delna as Marianne

L'Ouragan is a 1901 opera by Alfred Bruneau to a libretto by Émile Zola.

== Recording ==
- Gisele Desmoutiers, Camille Mauranne, Berthe Monmart, Pierre Gianotti, Nadine Sauterreau, Orchestre de la Radio Lyrique de Paris, Eugene Bigot 1957
