= Alfred Bruneau =

French composer (1857–1934)

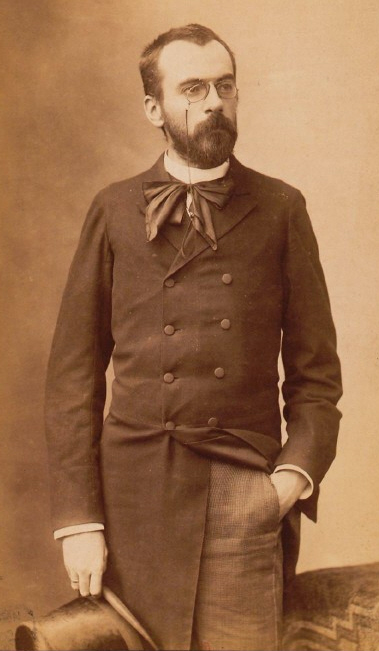
Alfred Bruneau, c. 1895, Bibliothèque nationale de France.

Louis Charles Bonaventure Alfred Bruneau (3 March 1857 – 15 June 1934) was a French composer who played a key role in the introduction of realism in French opera.

== Life ==
Born in Paris, Bruneau studied the cello as a youth at the Paris Conservatory and played in the Pasdeloup Orchestra. He soon began to compose, writing a cantata, Geneviève de Paris, while still a young man. In 1884, his Ouverture héroïque was performed, followed by the choral symphonies Léda (1884) and La Belle au bois dormant (1886). In 1887, he produced his first opera (9 June 1887, théâtre du Château-d'Eau), Kérim.

In 1888, Bruneau met Émile Zola, beginning a two-decade-long collaboration. Bruneau's 1891 opera Le Rêve was based on the Zola story of the same name, and in the coming years Zola would provide the subject matter for many of Bruneau's works, including L'attaque du moulin (1893). Zola himself wrote the libretti for the operas Messidor (1897) and L'Ouragan (1901). Other works influenced by Zola include L'Enfant roi (1905), Naïs Micoulin (1907), Les Quatres journées (1916), and Lazare (produced posthumously in 1954). Other operatic works by Bruneau contained themes by Hans Christian Andersen (Le Jardin du Paris in 1923) and Victor Hugo (Angelo, tyran de Padoue in 1928). Bruneau's orchestral works show the influence of Wagner. His other works include his Requiem (1888) and two collections of songs, Lieds de France and Chansons à danser.

Bruneau was decorated with the Legion of Honor in 1895. He died in Paris.

== Bibliography ==
- Arthur Hervey: Alfred Bruneau (London, 1907)
- James Ross: '"Messidor": Republican Patriotism and the French Revolutionary Tradition in Third Republic Opera'; in: Barbara Kelly (ed.): 'French Music, Culture and National Identity, 1870-1939' (Rochester, N.Y., 2008), pp. 112–130; ISBN 978-1-58046-272-3
- Steven Huebner: "Alfred Bruneau and Émile Zola" and "L'Attaque du moulin", in: French Opera at the Fin de Siècle (Oxford, 1999), pp. 395–425; ISBN 0-19-816280-4
- Manfred Kelkel: Naturalisme, Vérisme et Réalisme dans l'opéra (Paris, 1984); ISBN 2-7116-4253-4
- Viking Opera Guide, ed. Holden (1993)
