= List of compositions by Édouard Lalo =

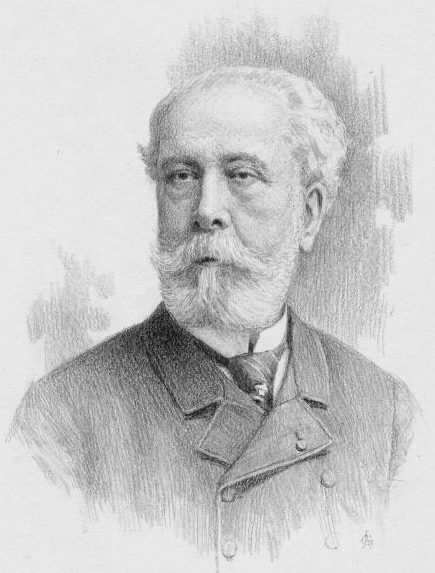
Édouard Lalo in 1891 (engraving by Richard Paraire)

This is a list of compositions of Édouard Lalo.

== Piano ==
=== Piano solo ===
- Sérénade pour piano

=== Piano, four hands ===
- La mère et L'enfant: two pieces for piano four hands

== Chamber music ==
=== Violin and piano ===
- Fantasie Originale, Op.1
- Allegro maestoso in C minor, Op.2
- 2 Impromptus, Op.4
- 2 Impromptus, Op.8♭*Violin Sonata "Grand Duo Concertant" in D major, Op.12 (1852)
- Soirées parisiennes: trois morceaux de caractère, Op.18
- Guitare in B minor, for voice (or violin) and piano (or orchestra) Op.28
- Arlequin in G major, esquisse-caractéristique, for violin (or cello) and piano
- Introduction et Scherzo, from the ballet "Namouna" (c.1884)
- Sérénade, from the ballet "Namouna" (arranged by A.Bachmann, c.1905)

=== Cello and piano ===
- Chanson villageoise, Op.14/1
- Serenade, Op. 14/2
- Allegro in B minor, Op.16
- Cello Sonata in A minor (1856)
- Chants Russes (arrangement of second movement of "Concerto russe" Op.29)
- Arlequin in G major, esquisse-caractéristique, for cello (or violin) and piano

=== Piano trio ===
- Piano Trio No.1 in C minor, Op. 7 (1849/50)
- Piano Trio No.2 in B minor (c.1852)
- Piano Trio No.3 in A minor, Op.26 (1880)

=== String quartet ===
- String Quartet in E♭ major, Op.19
- String Quartet in E♭ major, Op.45 (Revised 1884 from the Op.19 quartet, originally composed 1855)

=== Piano quintet ===
- Piano Quintet "Grand Quintette" in A♭ major (1862/3)

== Orchestral ==
=== Symphonies ===
- Symphony in G minor (1885–86)

=== Piano and orchestra ===
- Piano Concerto in F minor (1888–89)

=== Violin and orchestra ===
- Violin Concerto (No.1) in F major, Op.20 (1873)
- Symphonie espagnole (Violin Concerto No.2) in D minor, Op.21 (1874)
- Fantaisie norvégienne (Violin Concerto No.3) (1878)
- Concerto russe (Violin Concerto No.4) in G minor, Op.29 (1879)
- Guitare in B minor, Op.28 (c.1877)
- Romance-Sérénade (1879)
- Introduction et Scherzo, from the ballet "Namouna" (c.1884)
- Fantaisie-ballet, from the ballet "Namouna" (1885)

=== Cello and orchestra ===
- Cello Concerto in D minor (1877)

=== Other ===
- Scherzo for Orchestra in D minor
- Rapsodie norvégienne (reinstrumentation of "Fantaisie norvégienne", 1879)
- Divertissement for Orchestra (taken from opera Fiesque)
- Aubade-Allegretto pour dix instrument or petit orchestre
- Allegro symphonique Op.27 (based on Op.16)
- Namouna Rhapsody No.1
- Namouna Rhapsody No.2
- Valse de la cigarette, from "Namouna"
- Scènes de Savonarole, unpublished opera scenes (?)

== Opera ==
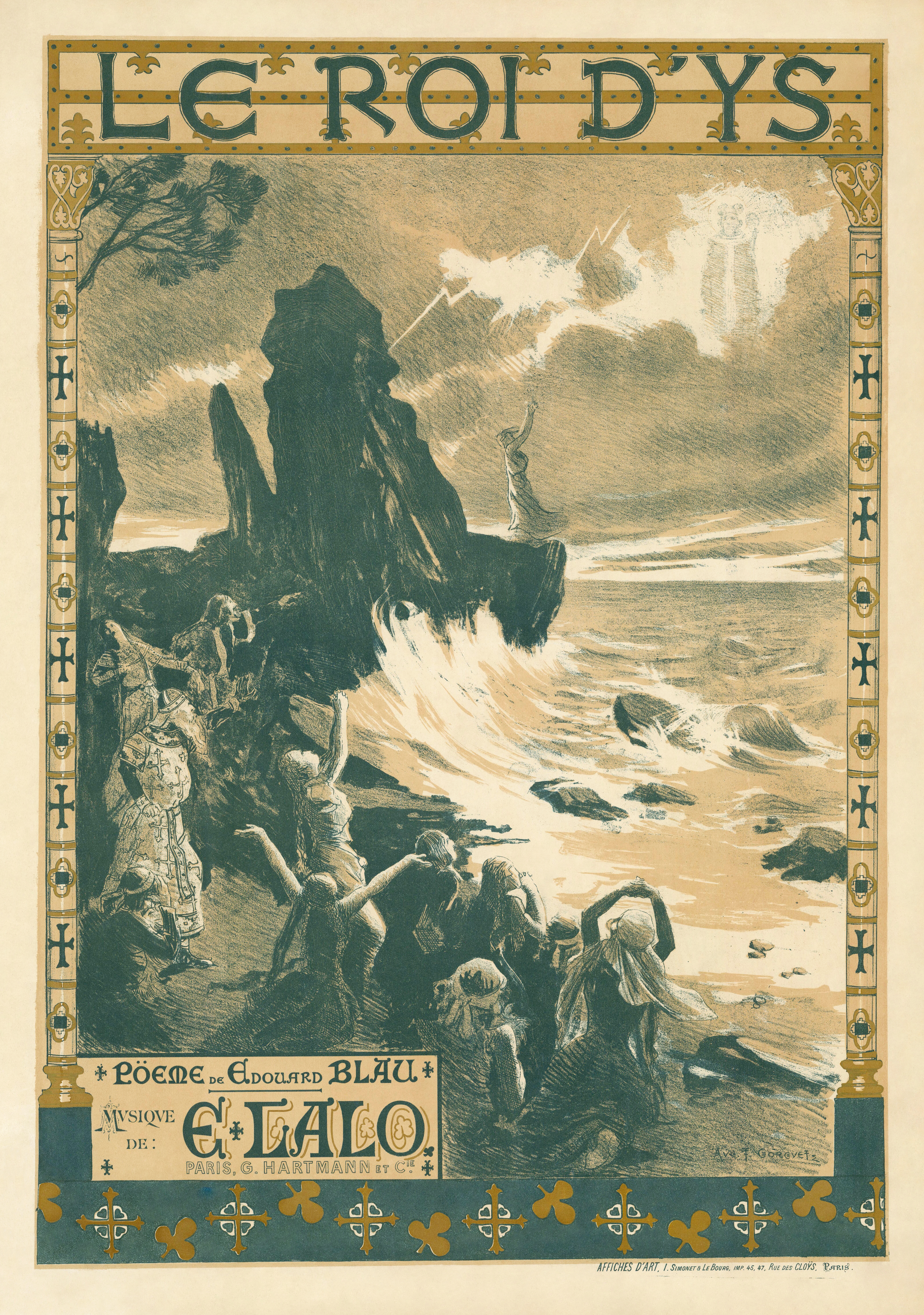
Poster for Le roi d'Ys

- Fiesque (The Genoese Conspiracy) (1866–68), (grand opera in 3 acts, C. Beauquier, after Schiller); world premiere concert performance: Le Festival de Radio France, Montpellier, France, July 2006; first stage performance: National Theater Mannheim, Mannheim, Germany, 16 June 2007. The UK premiere of Fiesque was performed by University College Opera at The Bloomsbury Theatre, London in March 2008.
- Le roi d'Ys (The King of Ys) (1875–88, full score n.d.), (opera in 3 acts, E. Blau), f.p. Opéra Comique (Favart), Paris, 7 May 1888.
- La Jacquerie (The Jacquerie Revolt) (1891–92) (opera in 4 acts, Blau & S. Arnault) (Act I finished by Lalo, completed posthumously by Arthur Coquard), f.p. Monte Carlo, Monaco, 9 March 1895.

== Ballet ==
- Namouna (1882) (book by Charles-Louis-Etienne Nuitter & Petipa), f.p. Opéra, Paris, 6 Mars 1882.
- Néron (Nero) (1891) (pantomime in 3 acts, P. Millier), f.p. Hippodrôme, Paris, 28 March 1891. (Pastiche based on Fiesque and other scores)

== Mélodies ==
- 3 mélodies (Musset)
- L'ombre de Dieu
- Adieu au désert
- Six romances populaire
- Le novice
- 6 mélodies, Op. 17 (Victor Hugo)
- Ballade à la lune
- Humoresque
- Aubade
- Souvenir
- 5 chants (Lamartine, Laprade, Silvestre)
- 6 mélodies (Musset, Gautier, Theuriet)
- Marine
- Chant Breton
- Dansons!, Op. 35
