= Léon Jehin =

French composer of Monaco's national anthem (1853–1928)

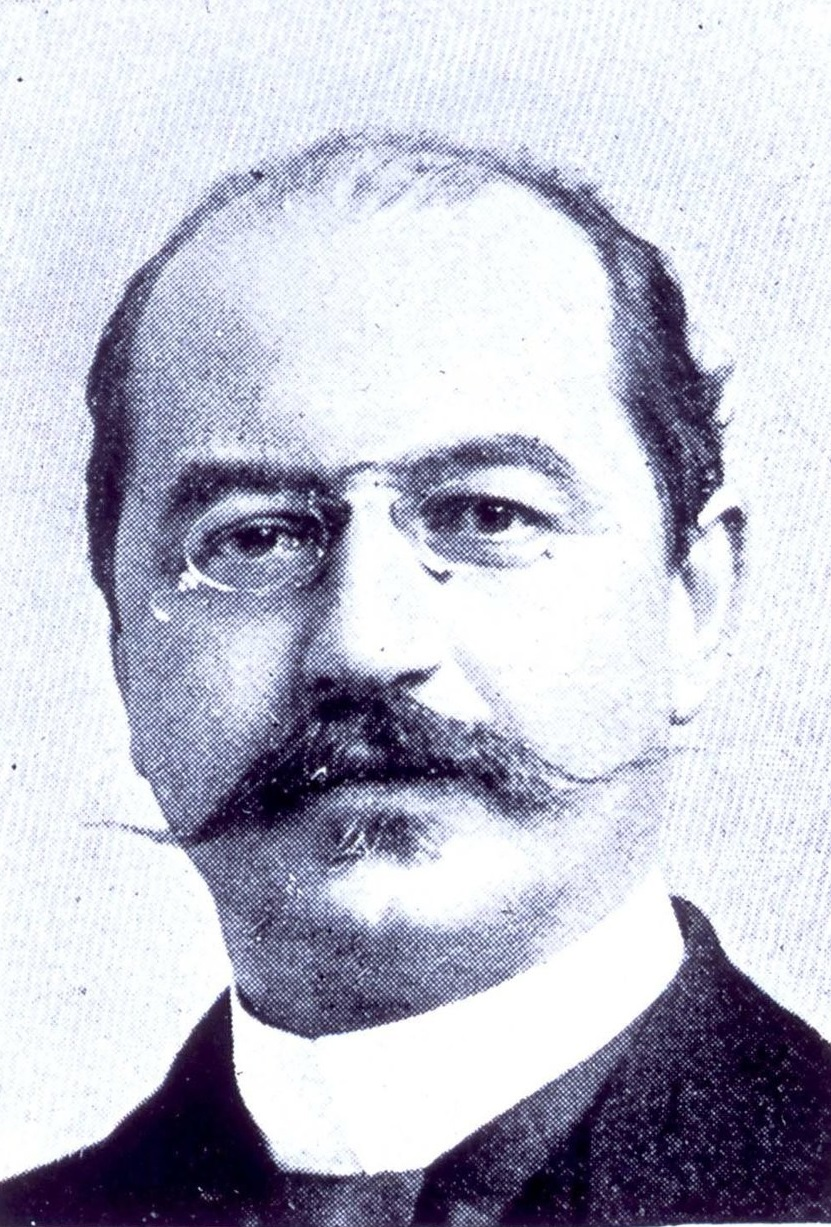
Jehin

Léon Jehin (17 July 1853 – 14 February 1928) was a conductor and composer, especially associated with the opera house in Monte Carlo. Jehin composed the national anthem of Monaco.

== Life and career ==
Jehin was born in Spa, Belgium. He studied at the conservatoire in Liege and then in Brussels. He was a violinist at La Monnaie in the Belgian capital and conducted at Anvers, Aix-les-Bains, and the Royal Opera House. In 1889, when he was an assistant conductor in Brussels, he succeeded Arthur Steck as the conductor of the Monte Carlo Opera in Monaco, a position he held until his death. His first performance there was of Mireille by Charles Gounod.

In addition to conducting the main repertoire at the Monte Carlo opera, he conducted the premieres of the following operas:

- Hulda (Franck) 8 March 1894
- La jacquerie (Édouard Lalo and Arthur Coquard) 9 May 1895
- Ghiselle (Franck) 30 March 1896
- Messaline (Isidore de Lara) 21 March 1899
- Le jongleur de Notre-Dame (Massenet) 18 February 1902
- Chérubin (Massenet) 14 February 1905
- L'ancêtre (Saint-Saëns) 24 February 1906
- Don Procopio (Bizet) 10 March 1906
- Thérèse (Massenet) 7 February 1907
- Don Quichotte (Massenet) 19 February 1910
- Déjanire (Saint-Saëns) 14 March 1911
- Roma (Massenet) 17 February 1912
- Pénélope (Fauré) 4 March 1913
- Cléopâtre (Massenet) 23 February 1914
- Béatrice (Messager) 21 March 1914
- Amadis (Massenet) 1 April 1922

In 1889 he married the mezzo-soprano Blanche Deschamps, with whom he had worked in Brussels.

In 1910, at La Monnaie, Jehin conducted Don Quichotte with the premiere cast and the Monte Carlo orchestra, as well as Ivan le terrible (premiere), and Le vieil aigle by Raoul Gunsbourg. He died in Monaco, aged 74. In 1953, a centennial concert was held in his memory in the Monte Carlo Casino.

== Compositions ==
Jehin's compositions include a Hymne à la Charte for soloists, chorus, and orchestra (Monte-Carlo, 1889), Scherzo symphonique (1902), Intermezzo for horn and orchestra (1909), a Marche Inaugurale (for the opening of the Musée Océanographique, 1909), and a Suite symphonique (1921).
