= La jacquerie =

- Opera by Édouard Lalo
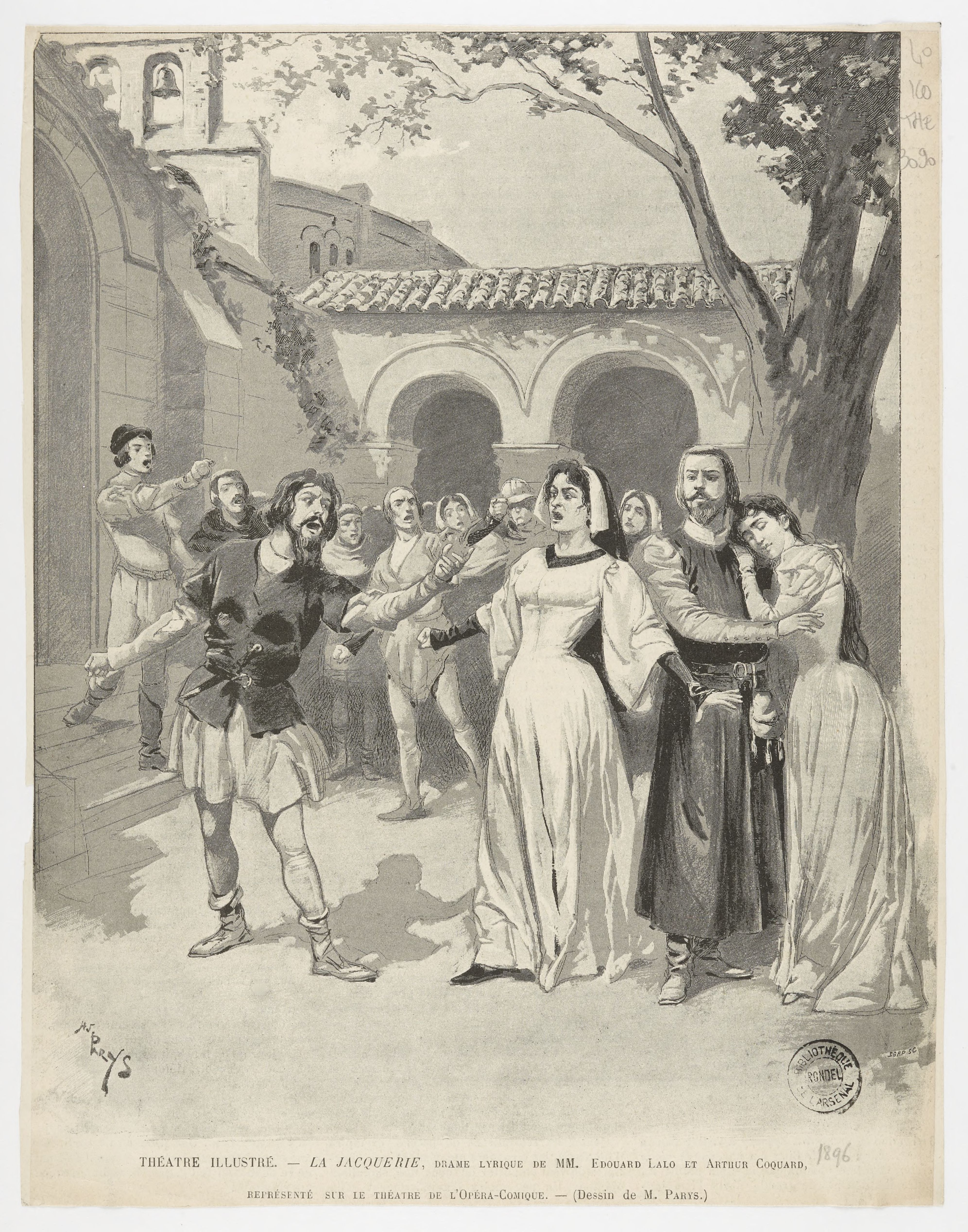
- Scene from Act 4 of the premiere production
- Librettist: Édouard Blau; Simone Arnaud
- Language: French
- Based on: the play La Jaquerie by Prosper Mérimée
- Premiere: 9 March 1895; Opéra de Monte-Carlo, Monaco

La jacquerie is a four-act opera commenced by Édouard Lalo in 1889 to a libretto by Édouard Blau and Simone Arnaud, based on the 1828 play of the same name by Prosper Mérimée. The opera was unfinished when Lalo died in 1892, and it was completed by Arthur Coquard. The first performance was at the Opéra de Monte-Carlo on 9 March 1895.

== Creation ==
La jacquerie would have been Lalo's third opera (following Fiesque (1868) and Le roi d'Ys (1888)). Lalo died after having completed only the first act. Coquard, a pupil of César Franck, was requested by the director of the Monte-Carlo Opera, Raoul Gunsbourg, to compose the rest. Alexandre Dratwicki notes that the opera bears traces both of Richard Wagner and of Giacomo Meyerbeer (in particular the latter's Les Huguenots.)

== Roles ==
Role	Voice type	Premiere cast, 9 March 1895 Conductor: Léon Jehin
Blanche de Sainte-Croix	soprano	Amélie Loventz
Jeanne	mezzo-soprano	Blanche Deschamps-Jéhin
Robert	tenor	Henri Jérôme
Guillaume	baritone	M. Bouvet
Le Comte de Sainte-Croix	baritone	M. Ucchetto
Le Sénéchal	bass	M. Lafon
Le Baron de Savigny	tenor	M. Declozens
Chorus (nobles, peasants, nuns)

== Synopsis ==
There are four acts, each of about 20 minutes. The opera is set in 1358, during the Jacquerie uprisings, in the village of Saint-Len de Cérent. Robert is in love with the aristocratic Blanche. Seeking to protect her from the mob he is wounded by them and dies in Blanche's arms.

== Performances ==
After its premiere in Monaco the opera was performed at Aix-les-bains in September and at the Opéra-Comique in Paris in December 1895. A critic wrote of it that the music was "small, but noisy". After this, the opera appears to have been ignored for over a century, but was given some performances in France in 2015.

== Recording ==
With Véronique Gens (Blanche de Sainte-Croix), Nora Gubisch (Jeanne), Charles Castronovo (Robert), Boris Pinkhasovich (Guillaume), Jean-Sébastien Bou (Le Comte de Sainte-Croix), Patrick Bolleire (Le Sénéchal), Enguerrand de Hys (Le Baron de Savigny). Choeur de Radio France, Orchestre Philharmonique de Radio France, conducted by Patrick Davin. Released 2016. CD Ediciones Singulares Cat:ES1023.
