= Symphony No. 3 (Saint-Saëns) =

1886 symphony with organ by Camille Saint-Saëns

- Organ
- by Camille Saint-Saëns
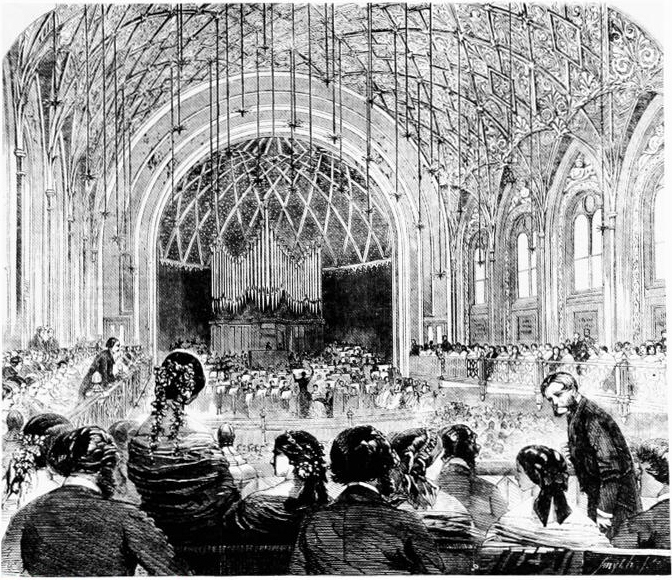
- St James's Hall, London, where Saint-Saëns conducted the premiere of his third symphony
- Key: C minor
- Composed: 1886
- Dedication: To the memory of Franz Liszt
- Movements: 2 (4)
- Scoring: Organ and orchestra

Premiere
- Date: 19 May 1886
- Location: St James's Hall, London
- Conductor: Camille Saint-Saëns
- Performers: Philharmonic Society Orchestra

The Symphony No. 3 in C minor, Op. 78, was completed by Camille Saint-Saëns in 1886 at the peak of his artistic career. It is popularly known as the Organ Symphony, since, unusually for a symphony of the late-Romantic period, two of the four movements use the pipe organ. The composer inscribed it as: Symphonie No. 3 "avec orgue" (with organ).

The symphony was commissioned by the Royal Philharmonic Society (then called simply the Philharmonic Society) in England, and the first performance was given in London on 19 May 1886, at St James's Hall, conducted by the composer. After the death of his friend and mentor Franz Liszt on 31 July 1886, Saint-Saëns dedicated the work to Liszt's memory.

The composer seemed to know it would be his last attempt at the symphonic form, and he wrote the work almost as a type of "history" of his own career: virtuoso piano passages, brilliant orchestral writing characteristic of the Romantic period, and the sound of the organ suitable for a cathedral or large concert halls (which were typically equipped with the instrument). Saint-Saëns noted: "I gave everything to it I was able to give. What I have here accomplished, I will never achieve again." Although Saint-Saëns was asked, following the resounding success of the symphony at its French premiere in 1887, to compose another symphony, he would never again return to the genre.

The Organ Symphony was the first of a spate of symphonic works by leading French composers. Édouard Lalo's Symphony in G minor was composed shortly after the London premier of Saint-Saëns' third (between August and November 1886), and premiered in February 1887 at the Concerts Lamoureux. (Note: Lalo's earlier Symphonie espagnole from 1875, despite its name, is actually a violin concerto.) Also in 1886, Vincent d'Indy wrote his Symphony on a French Mountain Air, while César Franck composed his Symphony in the summer and autumn of 1887. (Note: Since both d'Indy and Franck were "French Wagnerians", the idea of a symphony as a musical response to Wagner's influence does not appear to have been decisive.) Later examples include Ernest Chausson's Symphony in B-flat, written in 1891, and Paul Dukas' Symphony in C composed in 1896.

== History ==
=== Background ===
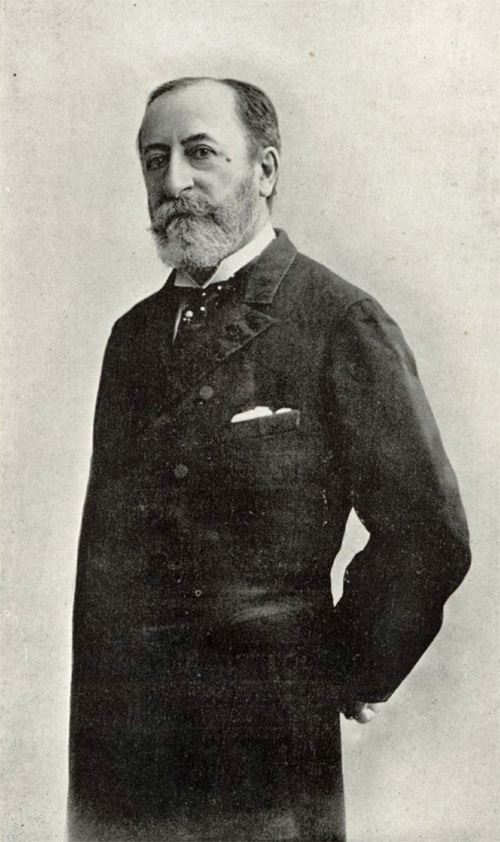
Camille Saint-Saëns ca. 1880

On July 4, 1885 the directors of the Philharmonic Society agreed to commission a new, specifically French orchestral work, preferring Charles Gounod, with Léo Delibes, Jules Massenet, and Saint-Saëns as backup candidates. While the fate of petitions to these other composers remains unclear (if indeed they were ever despatched), the following year the Society arranged to bring Saint-Saëns to London as piano soloist in a concerto of his choice (Beethoven's fourth concerto), and he requested that his little-performed A-minor second symphony also be programmed. The society responded by requesting "some symphonic work expressly for next season", to which Saint-Saëns expeditiously agreed, responding in a letter dated August 25, 1885 "without making a formal commitment, I can promise you that I will make every effort to respond to your wish, and to write a new symphony for the sake of the Philharmonic Society." Based on correspondence between Saint-Saëns and both his publisher Durand and the Philharmonic Society's honorary secretary, Francesco Berger, composition of the new symphony was concentrated in the first months of 1886. The autograph score indicates that it was finished by April of that year.

Saint-Saëns' decision to compose an actual symphony in response to the Philharmonic Society's request was unusual. First, almost thirty years had passed since the forty-nine year old composer had last written a symphony (in 1859), and his reputation as a concert composer derived principally from his piano concertos and symphonic poems. Second, the Society's interest in an orchestral or symphonic work by a French composer would have generally precluded an actual symphony since, as a genre, it had been largely ignored by French composers. While symphonies were regularly performed in Parisian concert halls, appearing in more than half of the "Grands concerts" series that were comprised by the orchestral societies of Jules Pasdeloup, Édouard Colonne, and Charles Lamoureux, almost all were by Austro-German and Nordic composers, especially those of Beethoven, Mendelssohn, and Schumann. French symphonic composers of the late eighteenth and early nineteenth century, such as Gossec, Leduc, or Méhul, were virtually unknown by the later nineteenth century. Symphonic efforts by later French composers, including those by Gounod and the early symphonies by Saint-Saëns himself, were very rarely performed, while the youthful symphony of Bizet would remain unknown until 1933. Rare exceptions, such as the 1869 premiere of Bizet's Roma Symphony by Pasdeloup at his Concerts populaires series, were not warmly received by Parisian concertgoers.

Both Jann Pasler and Andrew Deruchie view Saint-Saëns choice to compose a symphony as "a direct response to ... Wagnerism in France". In the period prior to his writing the symphony, Saint-Saëns had warned French composers against adopting Wagnerian techniques and ideas, not for their lack of merit or aesthetic value, but instead for their fundamental incompatibility with the French character and French sensibilities, exhorting: "young musicians, if you wish to be something, remain French!" In 1871, Saint-Saëns and Romain Bussine had founded the Société nationale de musique specifically to showcase French music by organising both orchestral and chamber music concerts featuring French composers. By 1885, however, Saint-Saëns found himself increasingly marginalised within the Société Nationale. Vincent d'Indy and Henri Duparc, both disciples of the Belgian composer, César Franck, and enthusiastic proponents of Wagnerism, took control and opened the Société Nationale's programming to non-French, and especially German music. In Saint-Saëns' view, they were a "Caesarean [i.e. César Franck] and Wagnerian coterie" who had turned the Société Nationale into a "closed salon, unrelated to the intentions of its founders".

It has therefore been suggested that, for Saint-Saëns, the symphony, in its form, represented "an appropriate vehicle for a musical response" to growing Wagnerism in France "by pursuing ... the very genre that, according to Wagner and at least some of his French advocates, had mandated the music drama after exhausting itself with Beethoven". and that the symphony was an opportunity "to deliver a classical response to the concerns of Wagner and French Wagnerians". Saint-Saëns himself did not ascribe a motivation to his decision to pen a symphony, beyond the interest in the genre that might be inferred from his request to have his earlier A-minor symphony programmed.

=== Composition ===
Saint-Saëns likely started working on the symphony in the late summer of 1885, but was at the same time busy composing what would prove one of his most popular works, The Carnival of the Animals. In a correspondence from February 1886, he wrote to his publisher Durand:

I am in the process of perpetrating a vast composition for the coming Mardi Gras [i.e. The Carnival of the Animals]. It is all one score. I have only the Finale to write. Fourteen pieces! You ask me whether I would do better to work on my symphony. You are right, a hundred times right, but [The Carnival of the Animals] is so amusing. (Note: The juxtaposition of Saint-Saëns composing simultaneously a work of serious dramatic intensity while also writing a light-hearted one has been frequently noted.)

Original sketches for the symphony indicate that Saint-Saëns originally wrote the opening theme of the symphony in the key of B minor. An early draft of the second theme was scored in C major, with a subsequent revision to its final form and the measures following (mm 102–140) also scored in C major and C minor, ultimately the final key of the work. Thus, the sketches of the extended exposition suggest that Saint-Saëns remained in some doubt as to the final key of the symphony, a conflict which he revealed in a letter to Berger: "this devil of a symphony has risen a half-tone; it did not want to remain in B minor: it is now in C minor." The shift from B to C minor meant that the "new symphony, with its cyclic thematic design, triumphant major-mode finale, and seamlessly linked movements, ... would invite comparison to the nineteenth century's ultimate model, Beethoven's Fifth". Like Beethoven's fifth symphony, the Organ Symphony, which proceeds from an agitated C minor opening to a rousing C major conclusion recalls the idea of a passage from adversity to triumph. Deruchie has argued that Saint-Saëns sought to infuse this "narrative design and the broad formal layout he inherited from previous symphonists with compositional procedures that had matured in other genres, notably the symphonic poem", highlighting the "eclecticism" of the work, notably in its unusual instrumentation (organ and piano) and "timbres and styles foreign to the [symphonic] genre".

It has been commonly noted that the opening theme of the symphony recalls the "Dies irae" by using the first five pitches of the well-known medieval chant. Given the dedication "to the memory of Franz Liszt", who died in 1886, it has been suggested that Saint-Saëns made intentional use of the motif to suggest the "resurrection and eternity" of Liszt. As various scholars have pointed out, however, the original dedication was intended "as a homage" to Franz Liszt the man, and not the memory, since his death occurred between the London premiere of the work and its eventual publication. In a letter dated June 19, 1886, Liszt wrote to Saint-Saëns, acknowledging both the intended dedication and "the success of the symphony in London". In Fallon's view, the work is non-programmatic and the coincidence of pitches with the "Dies irae" insignificant. In Deruchie's analysis, Saint-Saëns may have intended the idea of resurrection linked to the "Dies irae" with the renewal of the symphonic genre itself. In a 1918 letter to Pierre Adjutant, Saint-Saëns wrote "if a symphony could claim the honor of renewing the symphonic genre, it would be my symphony in C minor, on account of its unusual division and its use of the organ."

However, in the extensive program notes he prepared for the London premiere, while Saint-Saëns drew attention to novel features of his new work, noting its cyclic features and the unusual scoring for keyboard instruments and expanded woodwind and brass sections, which he suggested were a reflection of how "symphonic works should now be allowed to benefit [from] the progress of modern instrumentation", nowhere does he make mention of the "Dies irae", nor any programmatic intent behind the work.

Saint-Saëns gave the 182-page autograph score of the Organ symphony to the Bibliothèque nationale in September 1918, a few years before his death in 1921.

=== Reception and performance history ===
==== Premiere ====
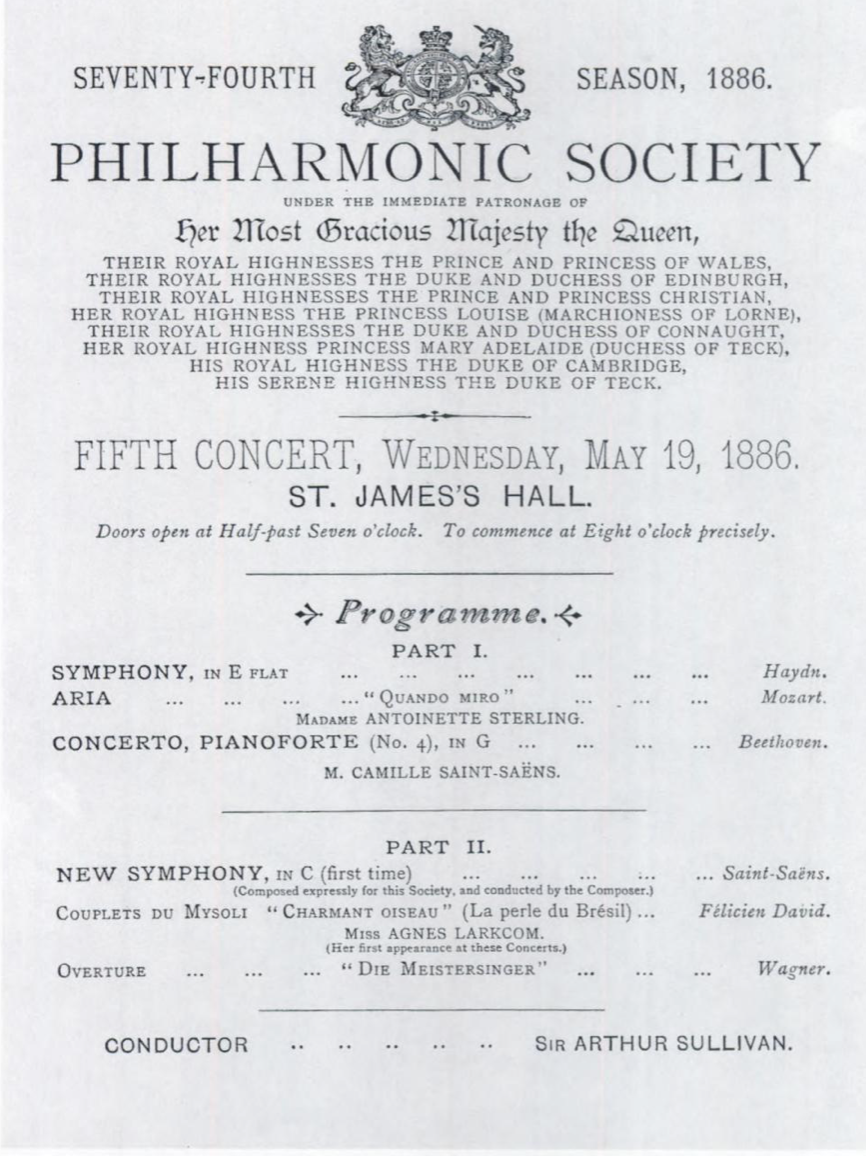
Philharmonic Society concert programme of 19 May 1886

The premiere, conducted by Saint-Saëns himself, took place at the Philharmonic Society's concert of 19 May 1886, at St James's Hall, London. In the opening half of the concert, Saint-Saëns was the soloist in Beethoven's Fourth Piano Concerto, with Arthur Sullivan conducting. In the second half, in keeping with the Society's tradition of inviting composers to perform their own works, Saint-Saëns himself conducted the performance of his new symphony. For his efforts, Saint-Saëns received an honorarium of £30. (Note: Saint-Saëns original request for an honorarium of £40 received the following response from Berger (the honorary secretary): "With regard to the terms named by you, perhaps you will be good enough to take into consideration that the Philharmonic Society is not a private speculation with the object of making money; – that it is an art institution carried on by Artistes here for the benefit of Artistes of all nations; – that all the receipts are spent upon the Concerts; and that the Directors receive no remuneration for their trouble and labour. All the great Artistes who have appeared at these Concerts have been generous in their arrangements, and you may, upon reflection, be willing to imitate their example, and treat this Society of Artistes like a Brother Artist, consenting to a somewhat smaller Honorarium, say of 30 pounds?")

Critical response to the London premiere was muted. In a brief notice in the London Standard, the reviewer indicated that he would need to hear the piece again to form an opinion.

The next performance of the symphony was its premiere in Germany, which took place in August 1886 in Aachen, at a concert organized by Fritz Wenigmann that featured an all Saint-Saëns programme, including the Rhapsodie d'Auvergne (in which Saint-Saëns was the soloist). The symphony took up the second half of the concert and was warmly received.

The French premiere, at a 9 January 1887 concert of the Société des Concerts, produced a much more enthusiastic response. Public response "was unprecedented for a new work", and the second performance a week later was similarly warmly received. Ambroise Thomas lobbied the committee of the Société for a third hearing of the work, arguing that the symphony was "powerful and exceptionally noteworthy, and given the invasion of German music, it would be well to offer another performance of this work that so honours the French school." A third programming of the work was indeed arranged and held on 13 March 1887.

==== Subsequent performances ====
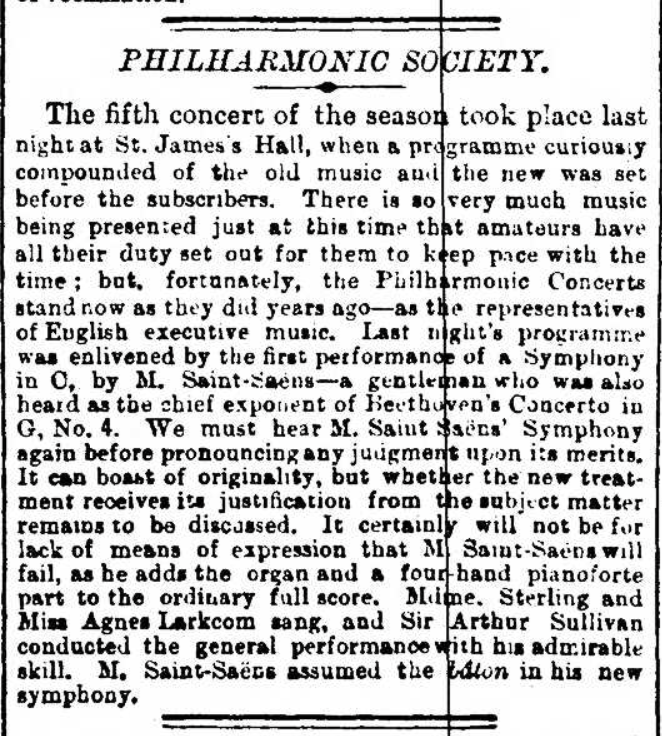
Concert review, May 20, 1886 London Standard

The United States premiere was given on 19 February 1887, conducted by Theodore Thomas, at the Metropolitan Opera House, New York City.

A notable performance of the symphony took place on June 2, 1913, where it was the featured work at a Jubilee Festival Concert held at Queen's Hall in Saint-Saëns' honour. The composer was in attendance (he performed a concerto by Mozart, the only work on the program not by him), where Alexander Mackenzie delivered an encomium at the concert declaring he had "led the advance of French music in every branch, and you are justly acknowledged today to be its most exalted and most gifted representative".

In May 1915, Saint-Saëns traveled to San Francisco as France's Official Representative to the Panama–Pacific International Exposition. He attended a performance of the Symphony No. 3 at the 3,782 seat Festival Hall. Karl Muck conducted the San Francisco Symphony. The composer was given a standing ovation at the performance, which was also attended by composer John Philip Sousa. Saint-Saëns composed another piece especially for the occasion called "Hail California", which included Sousa's famous band.

== Instrumentation ==
The symphony is scored for large orchestra comprising 3 flutes (1 doubling piccolo), 2 oboes, cor anglais, 2 clarinets, bass clarinet, 2 bassoons, contrabassoon, 4 horns, 3 trumpets, 3 trombones, tuba, timpani, triangle, cymbals, bass drum, piano (two and four hands), organ, and strings.

Saint-Saëns' use of keyboard instruments – piano (scored for both two and four hands at various places) and the organ – are unusual additions to the orchestration for a late-Romantic symphony. Following Saint-Saëns' own explanation provided in the program notes he wrote for the London premiere, the decision to include both organ and piano keyboard in the instrumentation stemmed principally from his desire to innovate upon the traditional symphonic scoring practice. Mendelssohn had included the organ in his second symphony, "Lobgesang", but that work is a symphonic cantata, while Vincent d'Indy's Symphonie sur un chant montagnard français, which includes piano concertante, was only begun after the premiere of the Organ symphony. This instrumentation "had not previously factored in an established symphony".

Saint-Saëns had appeared as the organ soloist in Bach's A minor Prelude and Fugue at a Philharmonic Society concert programmed on July 2, 1879 (where he also performed his second piano concerto), and it is possible that the presence of this instrument in the concert hall propelled him to include the organ. The instrument he had played at that concert was removed in 1882, replaced by a new organ made by Bryceson Brothers & Ellis, a fact of which Saint-Saëns was unaware. This new instrument had a different configuration and it has been suggested that the opening organ chords of the Maestoso finale would have been "disappointingly ineffective" as a result.

== Structure and analysis ==
The symphony has two movements:

1. Adagio – Allegro moderato – Poco adagio
2. Allegro moderato – Presto – Maestoso – Allegro

Although the symphony contains the normal four-movement structure (and many recordings divide it in this manner), Saint-Saëns wrote it as a two movement work. In the program notes that he prepared for its London premiere, he wrote:

This symphony, like its author's fourth Pianoforte Concerto, and Sonata for Piano and Violin, is divided into two movements. Nevertheless, it contains, in principles, the four traditional movements; but the first, arrested in development, serves as an Introduction to the Adagio, and the Scherzo is linked by the same process to the Finale.

A typical performance of the symphony lasts about 35 minutes. The symphony makes cyclic use of its thematic material, derived from fragments of plainsong, as a unifying device; each melody appears in more than one movement. Saint-Saëns also employs Liszt's method of thematic transformation, so that these subjects evolve into different guises throughout the symphony.

=== I. Adagio – Allegro moderato – Poco adagio ===
After its slow introduction, the first movement leads to a theme of Mendelssohnian (or Schubertian) character, followed by a second subject of a gentler cast, with various secondary themes played in major, and soon after repeated in minor forms; chromatic patterns play an important role in both movements. This material is worked out in fairly classical sonata-allegro form, and gradually fades to a quieter mood, which becomes a slightly ominous series of plucked notes in cello and bass, ending on a G pitch, followed by a slow and soft sustained A♭ note in the organ, resolving into the new key of D♭ major for the poco adagio section of the movement. This evolves into a dialogue between organ and strings, recalling the earlier main theme of the movement before the recapitulation. The movement ends in a quiet morendo.

=== II. Allegro moderato – Presto – Maestoso – Allegro ===
The second movement opens with an energetic string melody, which gives way to a presto version of the main theme, complete with extremely rapid scale passages in the piano.

The Maestoso is introduced by a full C major chord in the organ:

Piano four-hands is heard at the beginning with the strings, now playing the C major evolution of the original theme. The theme is then repeated in powerful organ chords, interspersed with brass fanfares. This well-known movement is considerably varied, including as it does polyphonic fugal writing and a brief pastoral interlude, replaced by a massive climax of the whole symphony characterised by a return to the introductory theme in the form of major scale variations.

== Performances ==
The symphony was performed by the BBC Symphony Orchestra at the 2009 BBC Proms season as the finale to a concert celebrating the 800th anniversary of the University of Cambridge, as the composer was awarded an honorary doctorate by the university in 1893. In the 2011 season, it was performed again by the BBC National Orchestra of Wales, and in 2013, it returned to the BBC Proms, this time with Paavo Järvi conducting the Orchestre de Paris. 2021 saw another return with Sir Mark Elder conducting The Hallé. On December 7th, 2024, the Orchestre philharmonique de Radio France performed it, conducted by Gustavo Dudamel, at the reopening of the Notre-Dame de Paris after a 2019 fire that severely damaged the cathedral.

Several performances by organist Anna Lapwood have brought attention to the Finale as featured on YouTube for the Opus Klassik 2024 and the September 2024 Concert at Royal Albert Hall.

== Recordings ==
External audio
- Performance by E. Power Biggs (organ) and Eugene Ormandy conducting the Philadelphia Orchestra in 1963

The symphony continues to be a frequently performed and recorded part of the standard repertoire. One of the most renowned recordings is by Charles Munch leading the Boston Symphony Orchestra, with Berj Zamkochian at the organ. Eugene Ormandy and the Philadelphia Orchestra recorded the Symphony No. 3 several times, with Virgil Fox, E. Power Biggs, and Michael Murray as the organists.

In 2006, the Ondine label recorded Olivier Latry performing the symphony at the inaugural concert of the Fred J. Cooper Memorial Organ in Verizon Hall, with Christoph Eschenbach conducting the Philadelphia Orchestra. Ondine released the recording in 2007 on SACD in 5.0 surround sound. Another well-regarded recording of the work is the Mercury Records "Living Presence" recording made in 1957 with the Detroit Symphony Orchestra under Paul Paray with Marcel Dupré on organ. It has been reissued on CD as Mercury #432719-2. BBC Radio 3 Record Review "Building a Library" recommended the Deutsche Grammophon recording with the Chicago Symphony Orchestra under Daniel Barenboim; uniquely, the organ used was over 3000 miles away, in Chartres Cathedral played by Gaston Litaize. Simon Preston made a recording in 1986 with James Levine conducting the Berlin Philharmonic for Deutsche Grammophon. In 2021, Thierry Escaich made a recording with Jean-Jacques Kantorow conducting the Orchestre Philharmonique Royal de Liège (Complete symphonies). 2 SACD BIS. Diapason d'or. The same year Olivier Latry made a new recording with Cristian Măcelaru conducting the Orchestre National de France (complete symphonies). 3 CD Warner classics. 5 Diapasons.

== Uses in popular culture ==
The entire main theme of the Maestoso was later adapted and used in the 1977 pop-song "If I Had Words" by Scott Fitzgerald and Yvonne Keeley. The Maestoso movement is also included as the final piece of music in the soundtrack for the film Impressions de France, which plays in the France Pavilion at Epcot at the Walt Disney World Resort. The song and the symphony were used as the main theme in the 1995 family film Babe and its 1998 sequel Babe: Pig in the City and can be heard in the 1989 comedy film How to Get Ahead in Advertising.

The piece is also featured in the Blue Stars Drum and Bugle Corps 2008 show "Le Tour: Every Second Counts" in the finale. The tune of the symphony also serves as the national anthem of the micronation of the Empire of Atlantium under the name "Auroran Hymn". Although not included in the soundtrack, the Maestoso movement can be heard along with Dvořák's 9th Symphony in Emir Kusturica's film Underground. The Maestoso also served as the opening work on Laserium's first all-classical show (and the first to have an actual plot), Crystal Odyssey. The composer Philip Sparke created a brass band test piece based on the symphony which was then assigned to Fourth Section bands for the National Brass Band Championships of Great Britain in 2010.

During the COVID-19 pandemic, as part of the BBC Proms series, the organist Jonathan Scott performed, in an empty Royal Albert Hall, his own transcription of the entire symphony for solo organ.

== Sources ==
- Bonnerot, Jean (1922). C. Saint-Saëns (1835–1921): sa vie et son œuvre (in French). A. Durand et fils.
- Cooper, Jeffrey (1981). The Rise of Instrumental Music and Concert Series in Paris, 1828–1871 (PhD thesis). Cornell University.
- Baumann, Émile (1923). Les grandes formes de la musique. L'œuvre de Camille Saint-Saèens. Paris: Ollendorff.
- Deruchie, Andrew (2013). The French Symphony at the fin de siècle: Style, Culture, and the Symphonic Tradition. Rochester, New York: University of Rochester Press. ISBN 978-1-58046-838-1. OCLC 859154652.
- Fallon, D. M. (1973). The Symphonies and Symphonic Poems of Camille Saint-Saëns (PhD thesis). Yale University.
- Flynn, Timothy (2003). Camille Saint-Saëns: A Guide to Research. New York: Routledge. ISBN 978-0-203-49491-2. OCLC 57592798.
- Foster, Myles Birket (1912). History of the Philharmonic Society of London 1813–1912. A record of a hundred years' work in the cause of music. London: John Lane.
- Herlin, Denis (2021). "'Ars Gallica': de la Société nationale de musique à l'édition des Œuvres complètes de Rameau". In Soret, Marie-Gabrielle; Engel, Laurence (eds.). Saint-Saëns: un esprit libre (in French). Paris: Éditions de la BnF. pp. 95–109. ISBN 978-2-7177-2828-6. OCLC 1237358736.
- Hervey, Arthur (1921). Sant-Saëns. London: John Lane. OCLC 868102642.
- Holoman, D. Kern (2004). The Société des concerts du conservatoire, 1828–1967. Berkeley: University of California Press. ISBN 978-0-520-23664-6. OCLC 1025219461.
- Pasler, Jann (2009). Composing the Citizen: Music as Public Utility in Third Republic France. Berkeley, California: University of California Press. doi:10.1525/california/9780520257405.001.0001. ISBN 978-0-520-25740-5. OCLC 808600746.
- Saint-Saëns, Camille (1885). Harmonie et mélodie. Paris: Calmann Lévy.
- Saint-Saëns, Camille; Aguétant, Pierre (1938). Saint-Saëns par lui-même (in French). Paris: Éditions Alsatia. OCLC 2066602.
- Smith, Rollin (1992). Saint-Saëns and the organ. Stuyvesant, New York: Pendragon Press. OCLC 1200567999.
- Strasser, Michael (March 2001). "The Société Nationale and Its Adversaries: The Musical Politics of L'Invasion germanique in the 1870s". 19th-Century Music. 24 (3): 225–251. doi:10.1525/ncm.2001.24.3.225. ISSN 0148-2076.
- Strasser, Michael Creasman (2004). Ars Gallica: the Société nationale de musique and its role in French musical life, 1871–1891 (PhD thesis). Ann Arbor, Michigan: University of Michigan. OCLC 62539748.
