= Le Rêve (opera) =

1891 opera by Alfred Bruneau

Le Rêve is an 1891 opera in 4 acts and 8 tableaux by Alfred Bruneau to a libretto by Louis Gallet based on Émile Zola's 1888 novel of the same name. It was premiered on 18 June 1891 at the Opéra-Comique (Paris) under the baton of Jules Danbé.

== Summary ==
The opera unfolds over four acts with only five characters and no chorus. These characters are Hubert, an embroiderer of church vestments; Hubertine, his wife; Angélique, their adopted daughter, whom they love as their own; and Jean d’Hautecœur, a bishop; Félicien, the bishop’s son, who is in love with Angélique and is loved by her in return.

Félicien’s mother died giving birth to him, and this loss deeply wounded Jean d’Hautecœur, who turned to religion as a refuge. Out of fear that his son might suffer the same kind of emotional pain, he insists that Félicien become a priest and refuses to let him marry.

In the first scene, we meet the innocent, mystically inclined Angélique at the Huberts’ home. She reads the Golden Legend and hears prophetic voices, like Joan of Arc, which show her glimpses of her future. She has heard that the bishop’s son is as beautiful as an angel and as rich as a king, and she begins to believe he might be the one she is destined to love. When her adoptive mother asks about her desires, she says she wants to marry a beautiful, noble prince. Their love would be pure, generous, and healing to others. She longs for deep devotion, to love him as one loves Christ. Ultimately, she wishes to never wake up from this beautiful dream but die in perfect happiness and be reborn in heaven.

Angélique dreams of a divine love suggested by mysterious voices. She soon meets Félicien, her destined beloved, and they instantly fall in love, promising eternal devotion. The story unfolds in Clos-Marie, where Félicien manages to meet Angélique's parents. The Hubert couple suspects the romance, and when they learn Félicien is the bishop’s son, they are shocked. Félicien confesses his love to Angélique and seeks his father’s approval, but the bishop refuses. Despite Angélique’s heartfelt pleas, the bishop remains unmoved, leading her to collapse in despair.

In her room, Angélique lies ill and asleep beside her unfinished work. Deceived into thinking they no longer love each other, she and Félicien reunite joyfully. They plan to flee together, but Angélique suddenly hears her guiding voices. She changes her mind, choosing a pure, spiritual love, and sends Félicien away, certain she will die.

Angélique is now dying. Félicien, desperate, begs his father for consent, hoping it might save her. The bishop remains inflexible. In anguish, Félicien confronts him, accusing him of emotional coldness and of never having loved his mother.

Félicien’s harsh words awaken both the priest and the father in the bishop. Deeply moved, he kneels, then rises to bring the last sacrament to the dying Angélique. In her room, her adoptive parents pray by her side. As the bishop begins the anointing ritual, Félicien begs him to pray for her. The bishop calls on God for a miracle. At that moment, Angélique awakens, declaring she knew she’d live until she was united with her beloved. Her dream is fulfilled, and the story ends with a hymn of thanksgiving.

== Music ==
Arthur Pougin does not think that Émile Zola’s novel provides suitable material for a lyrical opera.

He thinks "the composer pushes the purest Wagnerian traditions to their most extreme point": there are no "pieces"; "the scenes follow one another, the dialogue continues without interruption, without pause and without break, and — apart from the leitmotifs, of which there are several, of course — we never see a musical motif repeated once it has been established. Furthermore, no two voices are ever heard together, and the composer's intention to suppress the harmony of the voices is so firm that when, at times, the situation absolutely requires him to produce two voices together, he invariably has them sing in unison. Finally, he resolutely prohibits choirs; and this is so deliberate that, in the tableau of Clos-Marie, where there is a small scene of washerwomen, a scene that called for a choral ensemble in such a natural and felicitous way, he does not allow them to speak and has them dance instead of sing. Note that this is completely illogical, that the choir would have been perfectly at home there, and that nothing could replace it. But one either has principles or one does not. Let theatrical intelligence and logic perish rather than a principle!"

He finds the music often dissonant: "Dissonances are the spice, the chilli, if you like, of harmony; that is no reason to condemn us to constant red pepper." He adds that "the sense of tonality disappears almost completely, and one never knows, so to speak, what key one is in." It is therefore impossible for singers to find their place, and the composer was "often forced to support the vocal part by doubling it in the bass, which is anti-musical and produces a series of octaves with the most deplorable effect at every moment."

Finally, Bruneau's music "lacks symphonic interest".

The critic also highlights a number of qualities: the very successful use of the theme of a popular song collected by Julien Tiersot, or themes from liturgical chant, notably "at the end of the second tableau, by having invisible voices sing the theme of the Ave verum, and later by having the procession pass by to the sound of the Corpus Christi chant. "

All the performers are superb, as are the orchestra and its conductor, and the staging is very successful.

All in all, "the score of Le Rêve is a deliberately strange work, a work of fierce intransigence, designed to deliberately confuse the mind and ears, conceived in an absolutely arbitrary scenic and musical system, and in which a great deal of talent, very real talent, is expended to achieve a result which, I fear, is not likely to please the public very much. I am well aware that today the public is the object of contempt for some of our young musicians. But who are they working for, after all?..."

== Roles ==
Role		Première Direction : Jules Danbé
Angélique	soprano	Cécile Simonnet
Hubertine	mezzo-soprano or contralto	Blanche Deschamps-Jéhin
Félicien	tenor	Émile Engel
Jean d'Hautecœur	baritone	Max Bouvet
Hubert	bass	Eugène Lorrain
Les deux enfants de chœur	soprano and contralto	Jenny Falize et Suzanne Elven

== Sources ==
Arthur Pougin, in Le Ménestrel :
