= Ghiselle =

- Opera by César Franck
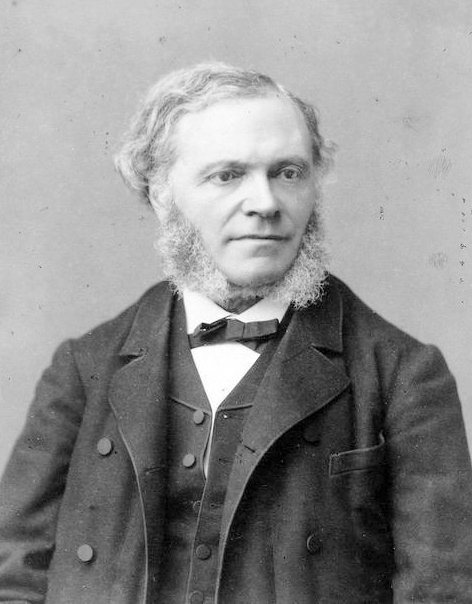
- César Franck, photographed by Pierre Petit, 1887
- Librettist: Gilbert-Augustin Thierry
- Language: French
- Premiere: 30 March 1896; Monte Carlo

Ghiselle is an opera by César Franck to a Merovingian-themed French libretto by the novelist Gilbert-Augustin Thierry, son of Amédée Thierry. The plot, set in the sixth century, while not keeping up with the "one assassination per act" of its predecessor Hulda (1886), is nonetheless rich in violent incident and ends with a double suicide.

Composition began in the fall of 1888 and the last page of the piano score bears the date 21 September 1889. Franck orchestrated the first act himself; the remainder were prepared for the posthumous premiere (in Monte Carlo) by his pupils Pierre de Bréville, Ernest Chausson, Vincent d'Indy, Samuel Rousseau and Arthur Coquard.

== Roles ==
Role	Voice type	Cast for the Monte Carlo premiere, 30 March 1896 (Conductor: Léon Jehin )
Ghiselle, an Austrasian princess	soprano	Emma Eames
Gudrune	Mezzo-soprano	Blanche Deschamps-Jéhin
Frédegonde, regent of Neustria and Ghiselle's captor	dramatic soprano	Ada Adini
Gouthram	tenor	Edmonde Vergnet
Theudébert	baritone	Léon Melchissédec
Bishop Ambrosius	bass	L. Mauzin

== Sources ==
Léon Vallas: César Franck, translated by Hubert Foss (London 1951)
