= L'ancêtre =

French opera

- drame lyrique by Camille Saint-Saëns
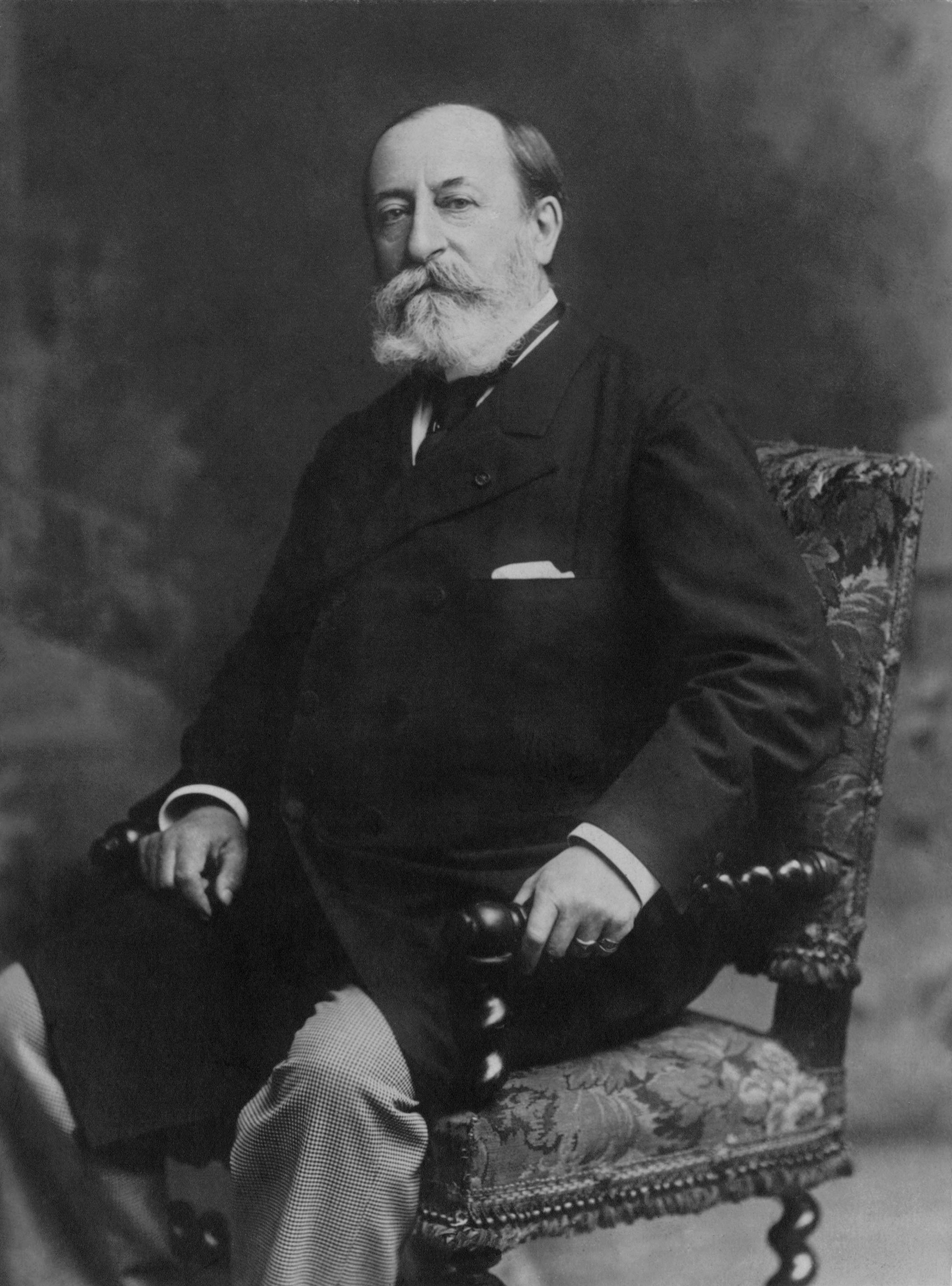
- Saint-Saëns in 1900, photographed by Pierre Petit
- Librettist: Lucien Augé de Lassus
- Language: French
- Premiere: Opéra de Monte-Carlo

L'ancêtre ("The Ancestor") is a 1905 drame lyrique in 3 acts by Camille Saint-Saëns to a libretto by Lucien Augé de Lassus (1841-1914).

The opera premiered at the Opéra de Monte-Carlo on February 24, 1906, and was directed by Raoul Gunsbourg and conducted by Léon Jehin. Celebrated soprano Geraldine Farrar created the role of Margarita. The vocal score, published in 1906 by Durand et Fils of Paris has a dedication to Albert I, Prince of Monaco.

The plot is set during the First French Empire in Corsica, which composer and librettist visited together, looking for local colour.

== Roles ==
- Raphaël, ermite ("hermit") (baritone)
- Tébaldo, de la famille de Piétra Néra ("of the Piétra Néra family") (tenor)
- Bursica, porcher, serviteur des Fabiani ("pigherder, servant of the Fabiani [family]") (bass)
- Nunciata, de la famille des Fabiani ("of the Fabiani family") (soprano)
- Margarita, sœur de lait de Vanina ("foster sister of Vanina") (soprano)
- Vanina, petite-fille de Nunciata ("granddaughter of Nunciata") (contralto)

Parents, serviteurs des deux familles Piétra Néra et Fabiani ("Parents, servants of the two families: Piétra Néra and Fabiani")

== See also ==
- Free score of L'ancêtre at the International Music Score Library Project (IMSLP)
