= Rapsodie norvégienne =

The Rapsodie norvégienne is a symphonic work by Édouard Lalo composed in 1879.

This rhapsody is a re-instrumentation of the Norwegian Fantasy for violin and orchestra, Lalo's previous score, using Norwegian folk tunes. It was first performed with great success at the Concerts Colonne (while being dedicated to Édouard Colonne, their founder) on 16 October 1879 and given again on 9 November. It is written in two movements:

1. Andantino - Allegretto
2. Presto.
