= Cécile Simonnet =

French operatic soprano

Cécile Simonnet (4 March 1863, Lille - 5 April 1921, Ravières) was a French operatic soprano.

Having obtained in Lille a first prize for singing, she entered the Paris Conservatoire in 1882, graduating in 1884 with first prize in song and opéra-comique (pupil of Bax). Simonnet made her debut in Monte-Carlo in January 1885 under Pasdeloup. Her Opéra-Comique in Paris debut was on 10 September 1885 in the title role of Lakmé. Her repertoire included Philine in Mignon, Mireille, Le Pré aux clercs, and Violetta in La Traviata.

She notably portrayed Rosenn in the premiere of Edouard Lalo's Le roi d'Ys (7 May 1888), as well as creating the roles of Angiola in Proserpine by Saint-Saëns and Angélique in Le Rêve by Bruneau.

She was singing Philine in Mignon the night of the fire at the Salle Favart on 25 May 1887.

She performed in Nice, Aix-les-Bains, London (Covent-Garden) and was engaged at the Théâtre de la Monnaie in Brussels for the 1894-95 season.
