= Chérubin =

Opera by Jules Massenet

- comédie chantée by Jules Massenet
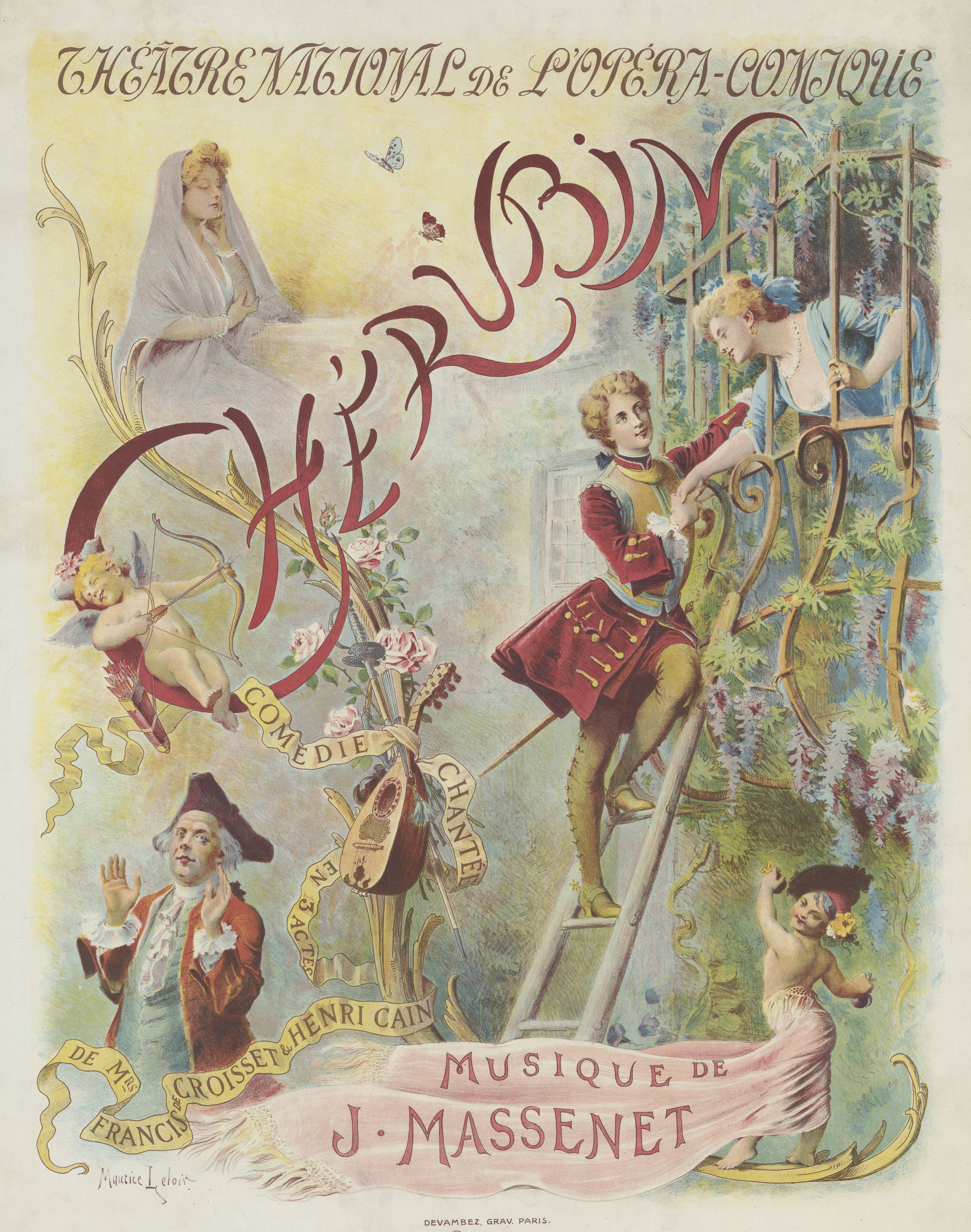
- Poster for the première of Chérubin (1905)
- Librettist: Francis de Croisset; Henri Cain
- Language: French
- Based on: Chérubin by Croisset
- Premiere: 14 February 1905; Opéra de Monte-Carlo

Chérubin is an opera (comédie chantée) in three acts by Jules Massenet to a French libretto by Francis de Croisset and Henri Cain after de Croisset's play of the same name. It was first performed at the Opéra de Monte-Carlo on 14 February 1905, with Mary Garden in the title role.

The story is a light-hearted addition to Beaumarchais' Figaro plays, the action taking place soon after that of The Marriage of Figaro, and imagines festivities in celebration of Chérubin's first military commission and seventeenth birthday. A farcical romp ensues, brought on by Chérubin lusting after each of the female characters and inspiring general confusion.

== Performance history ==
The piece has spawned a few contemporary revivals plus several recordings since 1980. The Royal Opera House in London premiered it on 14 February 1994 in a production starring Susan Graham in the title role. The performance was broadcast.

== Roles ==
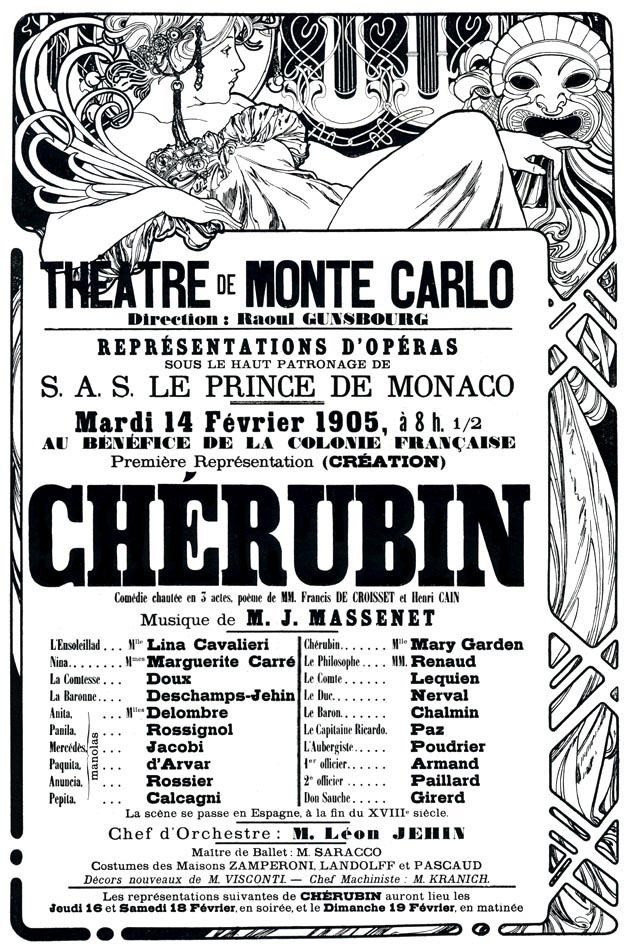
Poster of the premiere, listing cast

Role	Voice type	Premiere cast, 14 February 1905 (Conductor: Léon Jehin)
Chérubin	soprano lyrique	Mary Garden
Le Philosophe	bass	Maurice Renaud
L'Ensoleillad	soprano	Lina Cavalieri
Nina	soprano	Marguerite Giraud-Carré
Le Comte	baritone	Henri-Alexandre Lequien
La Comtesse	soprano	Doux
Le Baron	baritone	Victor Chalmin
La Baronne	mezzo-soprano	Blanche Deschamps-Jéhin
Le Duc	tenor	Nerval
Captain Ricardo	tenor trial	Paz
L'hotelier	baritone	Poudrier
Officier	bass	Krupeninck
Chorus: Manolas, Soldiers, Servants, Travellers, Gentlemen, Ladies; dancers.

== Synopsis ==
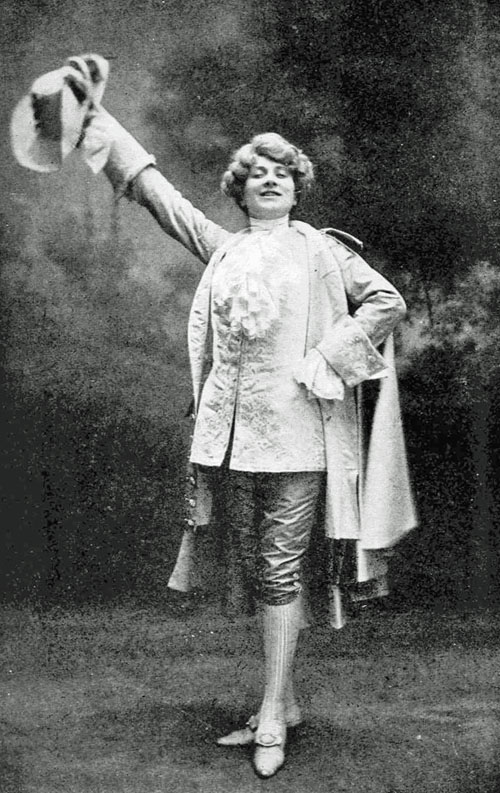
Mary Garden in the title role in the premiere

=== Act 1 ===
Chérubin, the young page of Count Almaviva, has just received a commission in the army. The Philosopher, Chérubin's teacher, announces to the servants that there will be celebrations to mark this event. The Duke and the Baron reveal that Chérubin has invited the famous Spanish dancer L'Ensoleillad to the party. Nina, the Countess's maid, confesses to the Philosopher that she loves Chérubin.

Chérubin arrives, greeting the men, kissing the hands of the women, and secretly slipping a love letter to the Countess. When the guests leave to celebrate, Chérubin tells the Philosopher that he is in love with both L'Ensoleillad and the Countess. Suddenly, the Count storms in and threatens to kill Chérubin because he just discovered the secret love letter from the page to the Countess. Nina saves the page's life when she is able to recite all the verses of the love letter and claims that it was really written to her. Stupefied but calmed down, the Count apologizes to the Countess and they return to the banquet. The Philosopher remains to hear Chérubin proclaim once again that he loves both L'Ensoleillad and the Countess.

=== Act 2 ===
At an inn not far from the Count's castle, arriving travelers argue with the Innkeeper about securing rooms for the night, complaining about the low quality of the facilities. Even the Countess and the Baroness are not happy with what they have received. Soon officers arrive and want to celebrate Chérubin's recent commission. When Chérubin arrives, he flirts with the mistress of Captain Ricardo, and Ricardo challenges Chérubin to a duel. The sudden arrival of L'Ensoleillad postpones the duel, but not for long. Ricardo and Chérubin begin to fight, when the Philosopher intervenes and arranges a truce. The officers leave. Chérubin successfully seduces L'Ensoleillad.

Chérubin stands outside L'Ensoleillad's balcony, which is next to the balconies of the Countess and the Baroness, and serenades her. Each of the three women thinks that Chérubin's song is really addressed to her, and each drops him a keepsake. The Duke, the Count, and the Baron discover that Chérubin is pursuing their wives, and become furious. They come out of hiding and challenge Chérubin to give them satisfaction. Chérubin flees.

=== Act 3 ===
Outside the inn, Chérubin prepares for the three duels awaiting him, and writes his last will. The Philosopher arrives and gives him a practical lesson on different fighting techniques, but is interrupted by the Innkeeper, who is horrified to see the combat. The Countess and the Baroness come from the inn seeking Chérubin, determined to discover whom he was serenading last night. He confesses to them that it was really L'Ensoleillad he was serenading. Satisfied with the explanation, the Count and the Baron then call off their respective duels, but Chérubin finds himself heartbroken when he sees L'Ensoleillad leaving the inn in glory and not even acknowledging him.

Finally, when Nina arrives and tells Chérubin she is going to enter a convent because he doesn't love her as much she loves him, Chérubin realizes the mistakes he has made, and that she is the right woman for him. He convinces her to stay with him because it is she whom he truly loves. The Duke also cancels his duel with Chérubin when the page announces to him and to all his love for Nina.

== Noted arias ==
- Act 1 – Chérubin: "Je suis gris!" ("I am drunk!")
- Act 1 – Nina: "Lorsque vous n'aurez rien à faire" ("When you have nothing to do")
- Act 3 – L'Ensoleillad: "Vive amour qui rêve, embrasse, et fuit" ("Long live love that dreams, embraces, and flees")

== Recordings ==
- Chérubin, with Frederica von Stade, June Anderson, Samuel Ramey and Dawn Upshaw, conducted by Pinchas Steinberg (RCA 09026-60593-2, 1991). For details, see here.
- Chérubin, with Patrizia Ciofi, Michelle Breedt, Paul Curron conducting Orchestra and Chorus Teatro Lirico di Cagliari, Dynamic 2006 DVD live performance.
