= Alain Altinoglu =

French conductor (born 1975)

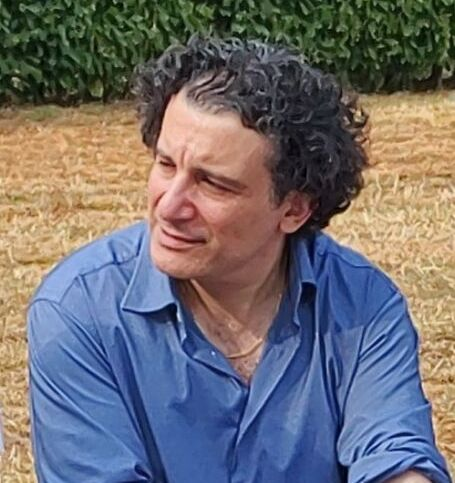
- Altinoglu at Rheingau Musik Festival, 2023
- Born: 9 October 1975 (age 51); Paris, France
- Education: Conservatoire de Paris
- Occupations: Conductor; Academic teacher
- Organizations: Conservatoire de Paris; La Monnaie; Frankfurt Radio Symphony
- Spouse: Nora Gubisch
- Awards: Ordre des Arts et des Lettres
- Website: www.alainaltinoglu.com/home.html

Alain Altinoglu (Note: French: Alain Altinoglu; Western Armenian: Ալէն Ալթինողլու, romanized: Alēn Altʻinoghlu; Armenian: Ալեն Ալթինօղլու, romanized: Alen Altʻinōghlu) (born 9 October 1975) is a French conductor of Armenian descent, and an academic teacher. He is chief conductor of both the La Monnaie opera in Brussels and the Frankfurt Radio Symphony. He teaches at the Conservatoire de Paris. He conducted performances and recordings of rarely played operas, such as Massenet's Thérèse and Lalo's Fiesque, and of new music including Pascal Dusapin's Perelà uomo di fumo.

== Life and career ==
Altinoglu was born in Paris to an Armenian family who were originally from Istanbul. In Istanbul, the Armenian surname Altunyan was turkified to Altinoglu. Altinoglu studied music at the Conservatoire National Supérieur de Musique et de Danse de Paris. After finishing his studies at the Conservatoire, Altinoglu joined the school's faculty and became director of the conducting class there in 2014.

Altinoglu conducted a concert performance of Lalo's neglected first opera Fiesque in 2006, with Roberto Alagna in the title role, Michelle Canniccioni as Léonore, Béatrice Uria-Monzon as Julie, Franck Ferrari as Verrina, the Radio Latvia Choir and Orchestra of Montpellier on 27 July 2006; a recording of it was released in 2011 by DG. He conducted a concert performance of Bernard Herrmann's opera Wuthering Heights with the Opéra Orchestre national Montpellier for Radio France in 2010, which was released as CD in 2011.

Altinoglu first appeared as a guest conductor with La Monnaie in 2011, conducting a production of Massenet's Cendrillon. In September 2015, La Monnaie announced the appointment of Altinoglu as its next music director, effective January 2016; it was his first formal post with an opera house. In December 2019, La Monnaie announced the extension of Altinoglu's contract through 2025. In August 2025, La Monnaie announced a further extension of Altinoglu's contract as its music director through 2031.

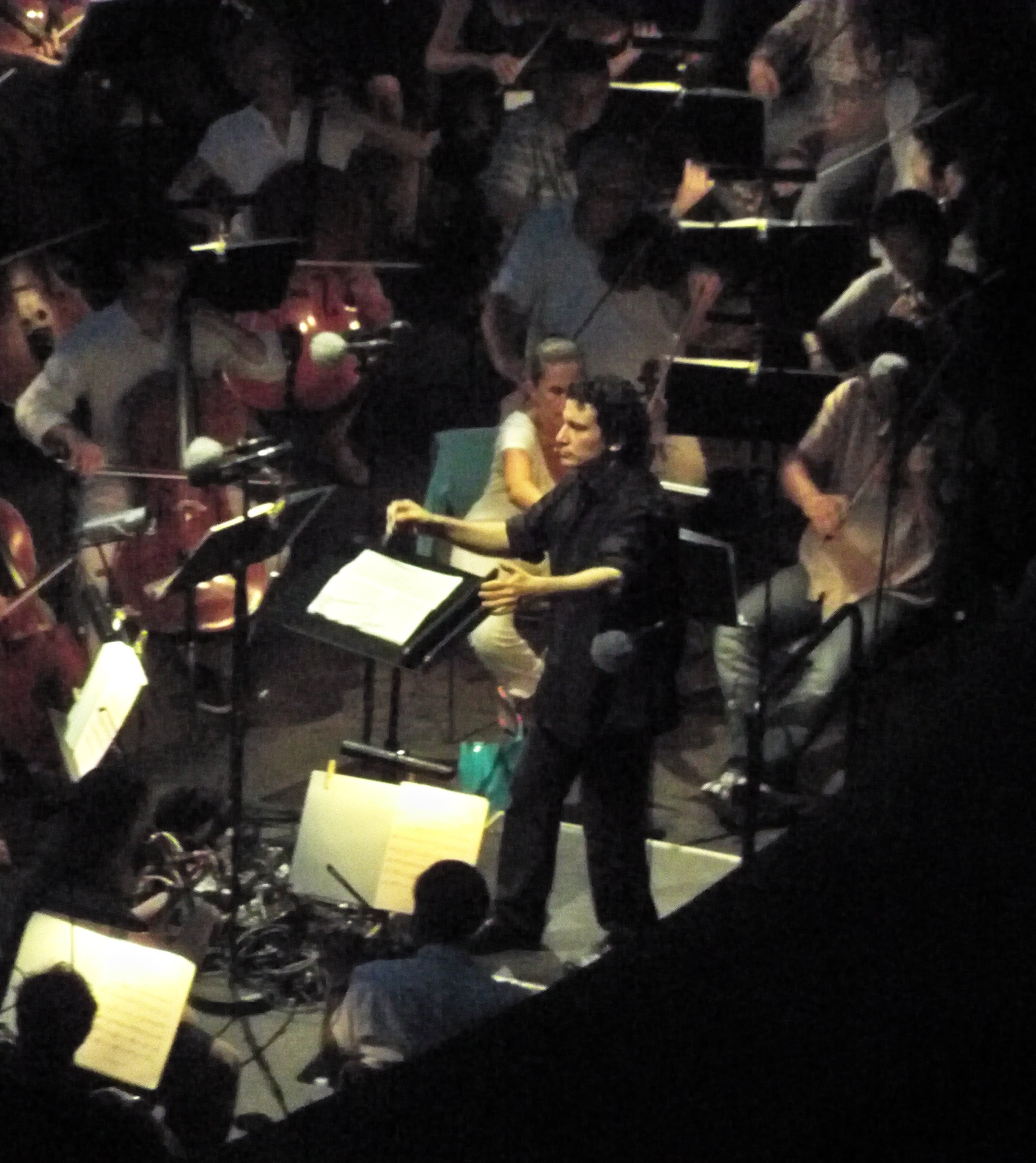
Conducting Verdi's Un ballo in maschera in Chorégies d'Orange in 2013

Altinoglu conducted a concert revival of Massenet's Thérèse on 21 July 2012 at the Festival de Radio France et Montpellier, with Nora Gubisch, Charles Castronovo and Étienne Dupuis in the leading roles, which resulted in a recording released in 2013. At the Bayreuth Festival, he conducted the 2015 performances of Lohengrin in the production by Hans Neuenfels.

In August 2019, Altinoglu first guest-conducted the Frankfurt Radio Symphony (hr-Sinfonieorchester). In December 2019, the hr-Sinfonieorchester announced the appointment of Altinoglu as its next chief conductor, effective with the 2021/22 season, with an initial contract of three seasons, as his first chief conductor position with a symphony orchestra. In May 2023, the Hessischer Rundfunk announced an extension of Altinoglu's contract as the orchestra's chief conductor through the 2027–2028 season. The orchestra has traditionally played the opening concert of the Rheingau Musik Festival at Eberbach Abbey, where Altinoglu has presented French music, such as Gounod's St. Cecilia Mass with the MDR Rundfunkchor in a live-streamed concert in 2025.

Altinoglu is the music director of Festival International de Colmar since 2022.

Altinoglu is married to the mezzo-soprano Nora Gubisch. The couple perform in recital together, and have recorded commercially together. Altinoglu has also made other recordings on CD and on DVD, including Pascal Dusapin's Perelà uomo di fumo, and Honegger's Jeanne d'Arc au bûcher. He recorded Khachaturian's Piano Concerto and Prokofiev's Third Piano Concerto with Nareh Arghamanyan and the Berlin Radio Symphony Orchestra in 2015.

== Awards ==
- 2023 Officier of the Ordre des Arts et des Lettres
- 2025 International Opera Awards Best conductor

== Notes ==
Cultural offices
| Preceded by Ludovic Morlot | Music Director, La Monnaie; 2016–present | Succeeded by incumbent |
