= Symphony in G minor (Lalo) =

The Symphony in G minor was Édouard Lalo’s final original orchestral composition. It was composed in 1885–86. (There were two earlier symphonies composed by Lalo, believed destroyed). It was premiered on 7 February 1887 in Paris at the Concerts Lamoureux under Charles Lamoureux.

It is a classically constructed romantic symphony with the composer’s Latin roots present in the melodies and orchestration. There are four movements with 28 minutes duration:

1. Andante – Allegro non troppo
2. Vivace
3. Adagio
4. Allegro

The instrumentation is two flutes, two oboes, two clarinets, two bassoons, four horns, two trumpets, three trombones, tuba, timpani, and strings. The full score was published by G. Hartmann in 1888, and brought out as a Heugel et Cie imprint in 1900 as plate 1820 (Heugel having purchased Hartmann in 1891). Xavier Leroux also made a four hand piano version, published by Heugel as plate 1795.

== Music ==
In a letter of 7 March 1887 to author and Wagner enthusiast Adolphe Jullien responding for information on the symphony, Lalo stated his belief in pure music over descriptive music:

It appears that you personally wish to have some information regarding the thought which predominates in my symphony. Alas, I am going to scandalize you! I had no literary thought in the sense that you mean. When I write a composition to words, I become a slave to what convention terms the verities of musical expression, according to a given text. But when I write music without a literary text, I have before and about me only the domain of sounds, melodic and harmonic. For a musician, this immense field possesses in itself, aside from all literature, its poems and its dramas. As to my Symphony, I have presented the master phrase in a brief introduction, as you have been kind enough to remark; it predominates in the first movement, and I recall it in the others whenever my poetic or dramatic musical intentions (do not laugh!) make its intervention seem necessary to me.

Lalo’s symphony was called one of the "happiest" of French symphonies in a 1925 article in The Musical Quarterly. Lalo’s is from the same period that produced three other notable French symphonies: Saint-Saëns Symphony No. 3 "Organ Symphony", d'Indy’s Symphony on a French Mountain Air, and Franck’s Symphony in D minor. Lalo's work was neglected until Thomas Beecham "discovered" it and conducted it regularly. In the United States, only the New York Philharmonic amongst major symphony orchestras performed the work up to 1970 (that sole performance being in 1931).

A 1961 review of the first major recording (Beecham’s made in 1959 at the Salle Wagram in Paris) disparaged the composition as "not very rewarding. Both matter and manner are dull and undistinguished, without the sparkle and melodic charm of the popular Symphonie Espagnole". A 1976 review of Antonio de Almeida’s recording suggests that "the cyclic theme does bear an unfortunately close resemblance to the opening of the Brahms B-flat Piano Concerto, in a way that Lalo surely did not intend". This review finds the second movement the most cohesive of the four and "wonderfully scored", suggesting Bizet's Symphony in C as the "closest equivalent".

== Discography ==
Conductor	Orchestra	Recorded
George Sebastian	Orchestra des Concerts Colonne	1953?
Thomas Beecham	Orchestre National de la Radiodiffusion Française	1959
Antonio de Almeida	Orchestre National de l'Opéra de Monte-Carlo	1974
Yondani Butt	Royal Philharmonic Orchestra	1989?
Giancarlo Andretta	Basler Sinfonie-Orchester	1994
Nikos Athinäos	Brandenburgisches Staatsorchester Frankfurt	1995
Kees Bakels	Malaysian Philharmonic Orchestra	2001
