= Nora Gubisch =

French operatic mezzo-soprano (born 1971)

Nora Gubisch (born Paris, 1971) is a French operatic mezzo-soprano. She is married to the pianist and conductor Alain Altinoglu.

== Discography ==
- Jules Massenet : "Thérèse". Altinoglu, Castronovo, Dupuis
- Maurice Ravel : Mélodies. Piano : Alain Altinoglu (Naîve)
- Henri Duparc : Mélodies. Piano : Alain Altinoglu (Cascavelle)
- Michael Tippett : A Child of Our Time. Staatskapelle Dresden, Sir Colin Davis
- Pascal Dusapin : Perelà. Orchestre national de Montpellier. Graham-Hall, Perraud, Juipen, direction : Alain Altinoglu (Naïve)
- Jacques Offenbach : Die Rheinnixen. Beczala, Jenis, Orchestre National de Montpellier. direction : Friedemann Layer (Accord Universal)
- Kodály : Háry János. Gérard Depardieu, Layer (Accord Universal)
- Humperdinck : Königskinder : Jonas Kaufmann, Roth, Sala, Armin Jordan (Accord Universal)
- Thierry Escaich : Les Nuits hallucinées : Orchestre National de Lyon, Jun Märkl (Accord Universal)
- Nora Gubisch – Folk Songs. Falla: Siete canciones populares españolas. Obradors: Aquel sombrero de monte el vito. Enrique Granados: La Maja dolorosa; El mirar de la Maja. El tra la la y el punteado. Berio: Folk song. Brahms: 2 Gesänge für eine Altstimme mit Bratsche und Pianoforte op. 91; Wiegenlied op. 49 Nr. 4. Nora Gubisch, Alain Altinoglu Naive, 2013
