= Le roi d'Ys =

1888 opera by Édouard Lalo

- Opera by Édouard Lalo
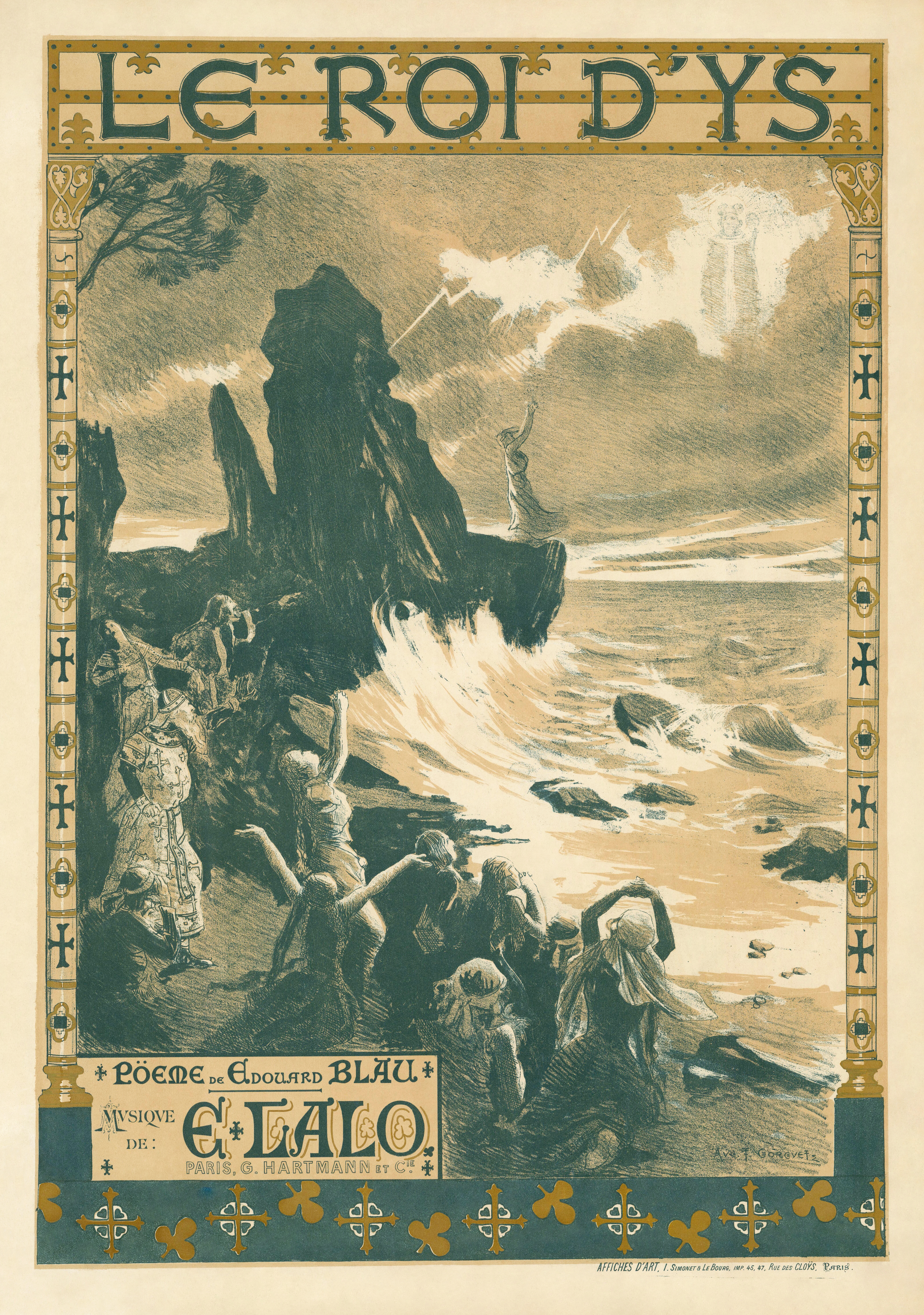
- Poster for the opera's premiere
- Librettist: Édouard Blau
- Language: French
- Premiere: 7 May 1888; Théâtre Lyrique, Paris

Le roi d'Ys (The King of Ys) is an opera in three acts and five tableaux by the French composer Édouard Lalo, to a libretto by Édouard Blau, based on the old Breton legend of the drowned city of Ys. That city was, according to the legend, the capital of the kingdom of Cornouaille.

The opera was premiered on 7 May 1888 by the Opéra-Comique at the Théâtre Lyrique on the Place du Châtelet in Paris. Apart from the overture, the most famous piece in the opera is the tenor's aubade in act 3, "Vainement, ma bien-aimée" ("In vain, my beloved").

Lalo was known outside France primarily for other work, but within France Le roi d'Ys was his most recognized work. His first version of the opera was widely rejected during the 1870s, but the revised work met with great success the following decade, becoming his most successful work for the stage.

== Performance history ==
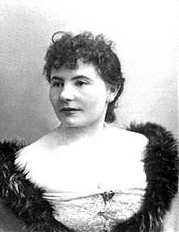
Blanche Deschamps-Jéhin who sang Margared in the world premiere of Le roi d'Ys

Lalo composed Le roi d'Ys between 1875 and 1878 (drafting the entire opera, in its first version, in 1875). His interest in the folklore of Brittany was prompted by his wife, the contralto Julie de Maligny, who was of Breton origin. The role of Margared was originally written for her.

Getting the opera staged proved difficult, however. It was turned down by the Théâtre Lyrique in 1878, and by the Opéra de Paris in 1879, although extracts were heard in a concert with Julie as Margared. Lalo undertook a revision of the work in 1886, and it was finally premiered by the Opéra-Comique in the Salle du Châtelet, Paris, on 7 May 1888 to great success. Within a year of its premiere, Le roi d'Ys had reached its 100th performance there.

It was transferred to the Paris Opéra in January 1941 after 490 performances over the half-century. The opera also enjoyed considerable success in Europe, with first performances in Geneva in November 1888, Amsterdam in December 1888, Antwerp and Brussels in February 1889, and Rome in March 1890. Soon after its 1888 premiere, the libretto was translated into Dutch, German, Italian, Czech, Russian, and Romanian. The first performance in England took place at London's Royal Opera House on 17 July 1901.

The work received its American premiere at the French Opera House in New Orleans on 23 January 1890, but it was not until 1922 that it was staged at the Metropolitan Opera. The Metropolitan premiere starred Rosa Ponselle as Margared, Beniamino Gigli as Mylio, and Frances Alda as Rozenn. With declining interest in romantic and lyric operas after World War I, however, when works of such previously popular composers as Massenet or Reyer suffered, the opera received tepid reviews and ran for just six performances.

Le roi d'Ys has only been sporadically revived in the last 60 years. There was a concert performance of the work in 1985 by the Opera Orchestra of New York, conducted by Eve Queler and more recently one by the American Symphony Orchestra conducted by Leon Botstein at New York's Avery Fisher Hall in October 2008. One of the most recent fully staged versions was the October 2007 production at the Théâtre du Capitole, Toulouse, directed by Nicolas Joël and conducted by Yves Abel with Sophie Koch, Inva Mula, Charles Castronovo, Franck Ferrari and Paul Gay in the leading roles. The Toulouse production was also performed in the National Center for the Performing Arts in Beijing in April 2008 conducted by Michel Plasson, with a French and Chinese cast. On 2 February 2008, NPR aired the opera with Paul Gay in the title role of The King of Ys. Lalo was known outside France primarily for his Symphonie espagnole (1874), but within France he was recognized almost solely for this subsequent opera. In March 2026 a new production from Olivier Py was premiered at the Opéra national du Rhin with great success.

== Roles ==
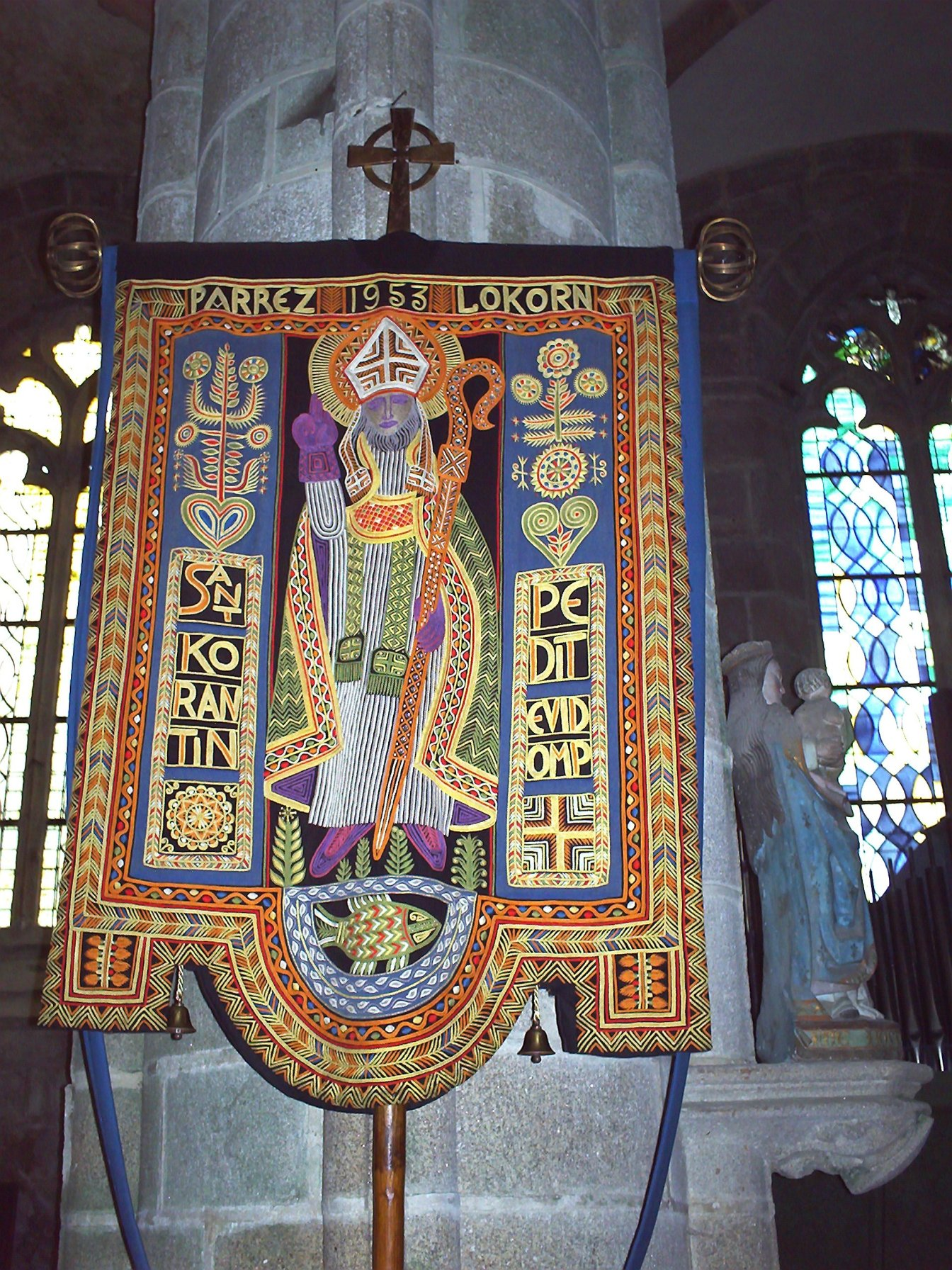
Banner of St Corentin in the parish church of Locronan

Roles, voice type, premiere cast
Role	Voice type	Premiere cast, 7 May 1888 Conductor: Jules Danbé
The King of Ys	bass-baritone	Cobalet
Margared, the King's daughter	mezzo-soprano	Blanche Deschamps-Jéhin
Rozenn, the King's daughter	soprano	Cécile Simonnet
Prince Karnac	baritone	Max Bouvet
Mylio, a knight	tenor	Jean-Alexandre Talazac
Jahel, the King's herald and master of the palace	baritone	Boussac
St. Corentin	bass	René Fournets
People, soldiers, gentlemen, priests, horsemen, ladies and followers

== Synopsis ==
Time: The Middle Ages
Place: The city of Ys on the coast of Brittany

=== Act 1 ===
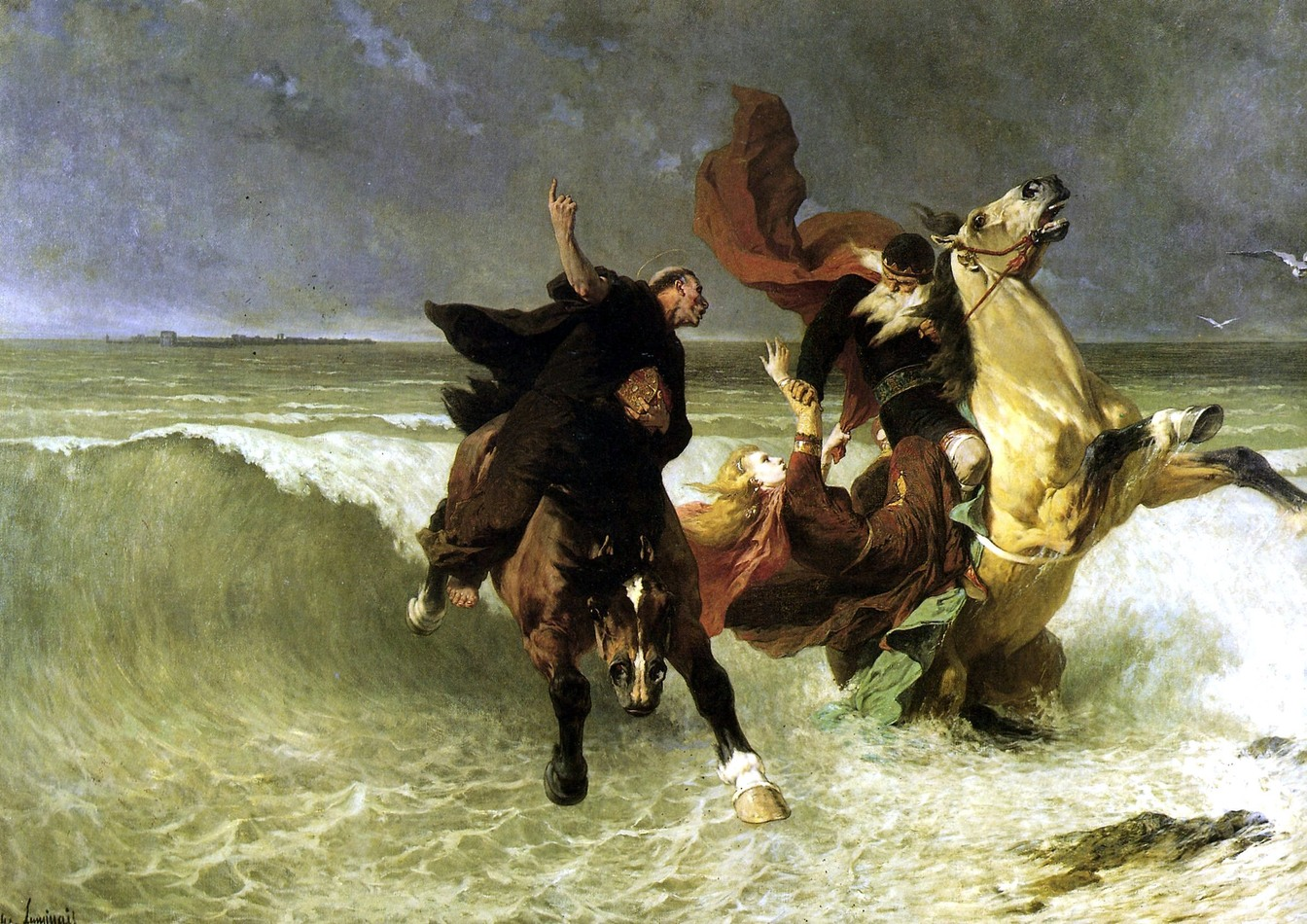
Flight of King Gradlon (the King of Ys), by Évariste Vital Luminais, 1884.

As part of a peace agreement, Margared, the daughter of the King of Ys, is betrothed to Prince Karnac, a former enemy of the city. During the celebrations she confesses to her sister Rozenn that she really loves someone who sailed away years ago "on the same ship that carried away Mylio", Rozenn's childhood friend and her beloved. But Margared is actually riddlingly referring to Mylio himself, and she is convinced that Mylio returns her love. During her wedding ceremony she learns that Mylio has unexpectedly returned and refuses to go ahead with the marriage. Karnac curses Ys and threatens vengeance.

=== Act 2 ===
Margared discovers that Mylio actually loves Rozenn and overhears the King promising Rozenn's hand to Mylio when he returns victorious from combat with Karnac. She is overcome with jealousy. Mylio indeed returns victorious, attributing his success to the support of the city's patron saint, St Corentin. On seeing the defeated Karnac, Margared offers to join him in seeking revenge. The statue of St Corentin warns her to repent, but she ignores him and plans to give Karnac the keys to the sluice gates that protect the city from the sea.

=== Act 3 ===
Aubade: "Vainement, ma bien-aimée"
Recorded in 1927, sung by Joseph Rogatchewsky, Élie Cohen conducting the Opéra-Comique

During the wedding ceremony of Mylio and Rozenn, Margared's resolve begins to waver. However, Karnac re-ignites her jealousy and desire for revenge, and they head for the sluices. The King notices Margared's absence from the ceremony and is troubled. Margared returns and announces to all that Ys is doomed — Karnac has opened the sluices. Mylio kills Karnac but too late to save the city which is now being engulfed by waves. Half of its citizens are drowned and the remainder are terrified. Margared, stricken with remorse, tells them that the ocean demands a sacrifice and hurls herself into the sea from a high rock. Upon her death, St Corentin appears and calms the waves thereby saving the city.

== Recordings ==
- 1943: Le roi d'Ys Germaine Cernay, Ginette Guillamat, Gaston Micheletti, Georges Ravoux, Paul Gaudin, Lucien Lovano, Choirs & Orchestra of Radio National, Désiré-Émile Inghelbrecht (CD Gesamtaufnahme Historische ton Dokumente).
- 1957: Le roi d'Ys Janine Micheau, Rita Gorr, Henri Legay, Jean Borthayre, Orchestra of Radiodiffusion Française/André Cluytens (Pathé/EMI)
- 1973: Le roi d'Ys Andréa Guiot, Jane Rhodes, Alain Vanzo, Robert Massard, Orchestra of Radiodiffusion Française/Pierre Dervaux (Chant du monde)
- 1988: Le roi d'Ys Barbara Hendricks, Delores Ziegler, Eduardo Villa, Marcel Vanaud, Orchestra of Radiodiffusion Française/Armin Jordan (Erato)
- 2008: Live video recording on DVD, Opéra Royal de Wallonie, Patrick Davin (conductor) - Jean-Louis Pichon (Stage director)
  Cast: Giuseppina Piunti, Guylaine Girard, Sébastien Guèze, Eric Martin-Bonnet - Dynamic 2014

The Act III aria Vainement, ma bien aimee, often labeled simply as Aubade, was widely recorded as an excerpt during the 78 RPM era. Aside from Joseph Rogatchewsky, whose recording appears above, some of the singers who committed it to record during the period were Agustarello Affre (Odeon X 97680), Colin O'More (Aeolian Vocalion A 24002), Ralph Errolle (Edison Diamond Disc 82560-L), Lucien Muratore (Pathé 54007), Richard Crooks (in RCA Victor set M 585), Beniamino Gigli (Victor 66070 acoustic, RCA Victor 12-0767-B from HMV D.B.6366 electric), Edmond Clément (Victor 74264), David Devriès (Victor 70021), Charles Rousselière (Pathé 4711), and Jules Gautier (Pathé 2-minute wax cylinder 477).

The overture was recorded a number of times in the 1920s and 30s by French conductors, including Philippe Gaubert, Albert Wolff, Gabriel Pierné, and Gustave Cloëz, as well as the Italian Piero Coppola, who made a specialty of French music. The first American recording was by Pierre Monteux with the San Francisco Symphony in 1942. It was recorded in stereo in 1956 by Mercury Records with Paul Paray conducting the Detroit Symphony Orchestra; initially released on LP, the recording has been reissued by Philips Records on CD. John Steane, writing in the Gramophone, described the performance as having "an ideal balance between hazy impressionism and stormy strife. This Overture is a striking example of sea and romantic legend music—a high-quality swashbuckler—with memorable solos for clarinet and cello (beautifully done here)." A more recent recording of the overture by Yan Pascal Tortelier and the BBC Philharmonic, which was included on a Chandos CD with Lalo's Violin Concerto, was also given high praise by the 2008 Gramophone Classical Music Guide as "certainly the finest account since Paray's old Mercury version."

== Influence ==
The character Rozenn is included in the graphic novel adaptation of the Legend of Ys, The Daughters of Ys (2020), by M. T. Anderson and Jo Rioux. The novel follows the perspectives of Rozenn and her sister, Dahut, leading to the events of the destruction of the city.
