= Fiesque =

French opera

- Opera by Édouard Lalo
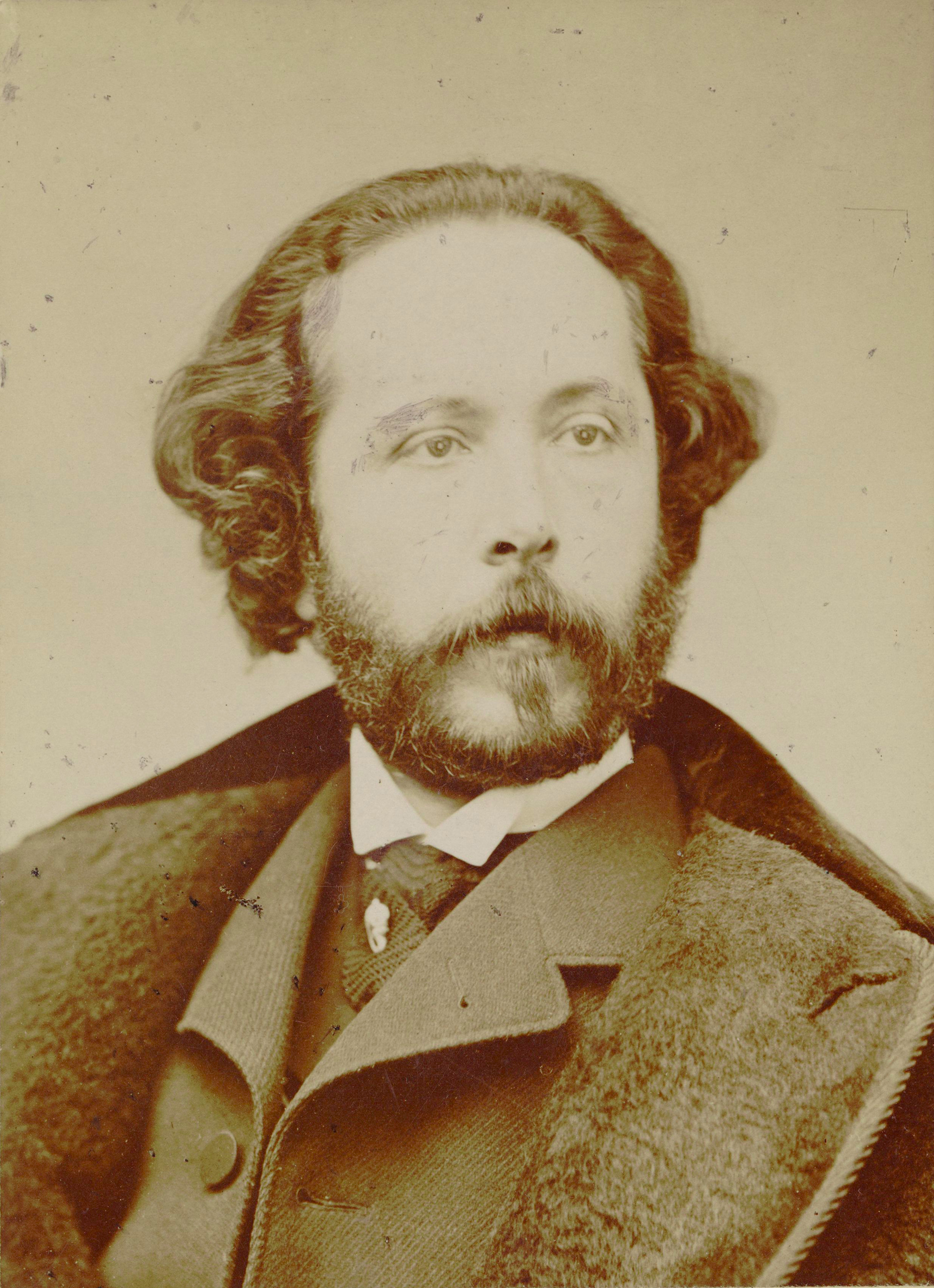
- Édouard Lalo, the opera's composer
- Librettist: Charles Beauquier
- Language: French
- Based on: the play Die Verschwörung des Fiesco zu Genua by Friedrich Schiller
- Premiere: 16 June 2007 (composed 1868); Nationaltheater, Mannheim

Fiesque (The Genoese Conspiracy) is an opera in three acts by the French composer Édouard Lalo. The libretto, by Charles Beauquier, is based on Schiller's 1784 play, Die Verschwörung des Fiesco zu Genua, an account of the conspiracy in 1547 led by Giovanni Luigi Fieschi against the ruling Doria family. Although completed in 1868, it was not staged until 16 June 2007 when it premiered at the Nationaltheater in Mannheim.

== Background and performance history ==
Lalo composed the opera between 1866 and 1868 as his entry in a government sponsored competition. It came third and was never staged in Lalo's lifetime. He re-used almost all of the score in several of his later works.

Fiesque had its first staged performance at the Nationaltheater, Mannheim on 16 June 2007. The concert premiere took place on 27 July 2006 at the Festival de Radio France et Montpellier with Roberto Alagna in the title role. The UK premiere took place on 10 March 2008, in a production by University College Opera.

== Synopsis ==
Place: Genoa, Italy
Time: 1547.

=== Act 1 ===
Fiesque’s palace, an evening party

Leonore, Fiesque’s wife, confides that her marriage is in ruins: she has seen her husband with another woman. Fiesque’s enemy, (Gianettino Doria), instructs the assassin Hassan to murder Fiesque. Fiesque declares his love for the princess Julie Doria, Gianettino’s sister. Verrina, Fiesque’s old friend and ally, worries that Fiesque has gone off the rails and now prizes pleasure above his country’s honour. Hassan accosts Fiesque but Fiesque easily overpowers him. Hassan, fearful for his life, offers to do anything Fiesque asks, and Fiesque instructs him to mix with the townspeople and report what they are saying about the Dorias.

=== Act 2 ===
Scene 1: A crowded market place

Hassan plies the townspeople with drink and incites gossip. Verrina enters and whips the public up into a frenzy of rebellion.

Scene 2: A chamber in Fiesque’s palace

Fiesque reflects on a dream he had the night before: the image of his wedding day was shattered by visions of him being crowned Doge and celebrated by crowds of adoring subjects. Leonore arrives, worn down by the tension in her marriage. Fiesque reassures her that within two days she will have proof of his enduring love for her. Hassan enters and recounts to the audience the events of the market place. He reports that Julie has engaged him to poison Leonore; he will betray her intentions to Fiesque and have twice the money! Verrina visits Fiesque at home with the painter Romano and the activists Borgonino and Sacco. He wants to test whether Fiesque is still committed to rebelling against the Dorias or if he has become concerned only with his own pleasure. To test this Verrina brings a painting of the death of Virginius to see if it elicits a reaction in Fiesque. By the end of the scene Verrina’s confidence in Fiesque is restored, and the building blocks for the revolution set in place.

=== Act 3 ===
Scene 1: A vault in Fiesque’s palace

Borgonino organises an underground gathering of Fiesque’s supporters to plan the revolution. Leonore tries to soothe her own anxiety and sense of foreboding. She hears a woman approaching and hides. Julie enters and sings about the pleasures of being a coquette, but eventually confesses her genuine love for Fiesque. Fiesque arrives and begins an impassioned love scene with Julie. At its climax, however, Fiesque reveals his fidelity to Leonore, and denounces Julie for being guilty of intent to murder. Fiesque and Leonore are reunited; Julie swears vengeance, but Fiesque has her captured.

Scene 2: The port of Genoa

The sacking of Genoa, and victory for the Fieschi: the Dorias are overthrown. Fiesque is made ruler of Genoa and Leonore begs Fiesque’s forgiveness for mistrusting him. Fiesque invites Verrina to join in the celebrations, but Verrina is reluctant, troubled by Fiesque's display of ambition and taste for celebrity. Verrina pleads with Fiesque to renounce his regal trappings in favour of leading a true republic, but Fiesque makes light of Verrina’s concerns. Eventually, disillusioned by the change in his friend and fearful for the future of the country, Verrina kills Fiesque.

== Recordings ==
- Roberto Alagna (Fiesque), Michelle Canniccioni (Léonore), Béatrice Uria-Monzon (Julie), Franck Ferrari (Verrina), Radio Latvia Choir, Orchestra of Montpellier, conducted by Alain Altinoglu. A recording of the 27 July 2006 concert performance. DG, 2011.
- An aria was recorded by Iris Hendrickx (as Léonore), on a French Opera Arias recital, with Patrick Fournillier conducting the Orchestra sinfonica di Milano Giuseppe Verdi, in September 2017, released by Centaur Records in July 2018.
