= Cello Concerto (Lalo) =

1876 composition by Édouard Lalo

- by Édouard Lalo
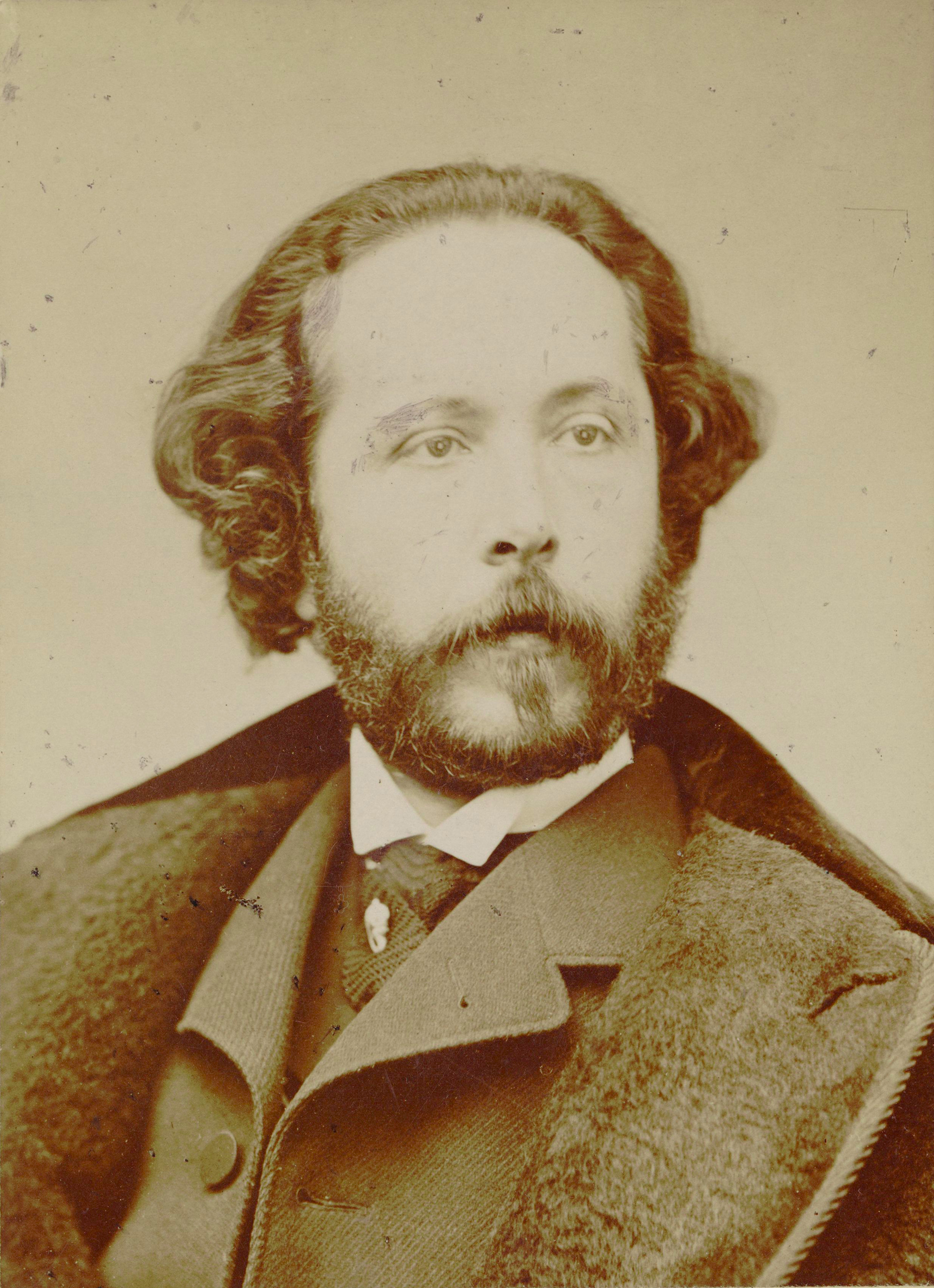
- Lalo in 1865
- Key: D minor
- Opus: 129
- Composed: 1876
- Movements: 3

Premiere
- Date: 1877
- Location: Cirque d'Hiver, Paris
- Performers: Adolphe Fischer

Édouard Lalo wrote his Cello Concerto in D minor in 1876, in collaboration with the Belgian cellist Adolphe Fischer (1847–91). The cello concerto was premièred the following year at the Cirque d'Hiver in Paris with Fischer as soloist.

== Form ==
The concerto is written in three movements:

1. Prelude, lento – Allegro maestoso
2. Intermezzo, andantino con moto – Allegro presto – Andantino – Tempo I
3. Introduction, andante – Allegro vivace

The first movement opens lento, then moves into an allegro maestoso, which continues throughout the rest of the movement. The opening has several measures of orchestral music before the solo cello enters with an ad lib theme that is played three times. This leads into the fast section, which features many fast and aggressive arpeggios, and quick and relentless sixteenth notes.

The second movement starts with a slow andantino section, then progresses into a lively allegro presto. The music returns to the andantino tempo. Before the end of the second movement, the allegro presto returns. The solo cello ends on pizzicato chords with the orchestra.

The solo cello opens with a slow andante in the third movement; the orchestra joins in and then takes over. The music becomes a lively rondo marked allegro vivace, the cello solo returning with a forceful entry into the rondo theme. The main theme is based on the D major scale and a quick fall down. The rest of the movement continues at allegro vivace tempo. The solo cello ends with a very fast scale that lands on a C sharp trill that resolves to the tonic.

== Instrumentation ==
Scored for solo cello, 2 flutes, 2 oboes, 2 clarinets, 2 bassoons, 4 horns, 2 trumpets, 3 trombones, timpani, and strings.
