= Blanche Deschamps-Jéhin =

French opera singer

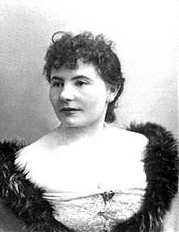

Blanche Deschamps-Jéhin (also Marie Blanche Deschamps-Jehin) (18 September 1857, Lyon - June 1923, Paris) was a French operatic contralto who had a prolific career in France from 1879-1905. She possessed a rich-toned and flexible voice that had a wide vocal range. She sang in numerous world premieres throughout her career, most notably originating the title role in Jules Massenet’s Hérodiade in 1881.

== Biography ==
Deschamps-Jehin studied singing in Lyon and Paris before making her professional opera début in the title role of Ambroise Thomas's Mignon at La Monnaie (1879) in Brussels. She continued to sing at that opera house for the next several years, notably portraying the title role in the world premiere of Jules Massenet’s Hérodiade (1881) and Uta in the world premiere of Ernest Reyer’s Sigurd (1884).

Deschamps-Jehin joined the roster at the Opéra-Comique in Paris in the mid-1880s, singing there for more than a decade. While there, she notably portrayed Margared in the world premiere of Edouard Lalo's Le roi d'Ys (1888), Madame de la Haltière in the world premiere of Massenet’s Cendrillon (1899) and the Mother in the world premiere of Gustave Charpentier's Louise (1900). She also occasionally performed at the Opéra de Monte-Carlo where she sang the title role in the first performance of César Franck’s Hulda (1894) and created the Baroness in the world premiere of Massenet’s Chérubin (1905). In 1891 she made her first appearance at the Paris Opéra as Léonor in Gaetano Donizetti's La favorite, later singing Fidès in Giacomo Meyerbeer's Le prophète, Amneris in Verdi's Aida, Hedwige in Rossini's William Tell, Delilah in Camille Saint-Saëns's Samson et Dalila, Gertrude in Ambroise Thomas's Hamlet, Ortrud, Fricka, and Véronique in the first performance of Alfred Bruneau’s Messidor (1897). Her repertory also included Carmen, Azucena, Brangäne and Erda.
