= Arthur Coquard =

French composer and music critic

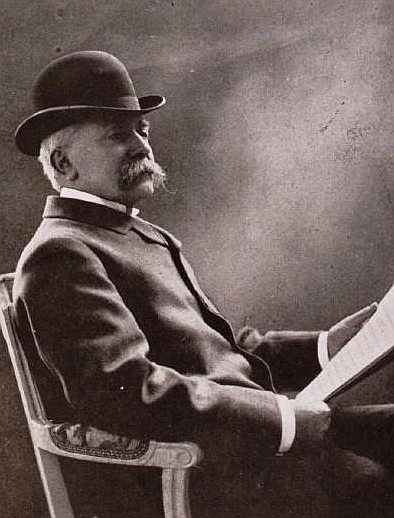
Arthur Coquard

Arthur Coquard (26 May 1846 – 20 August 1910) was a French composer and music critic.

He studied composition with César Franck, and was a music critic for Le Monde and L'Echo de Paris. He served as director of the Institut National des Jeunes Aveugles (National Institute for Blind Children) from 1891–99.

Coquard completed Edouard Lalo's opera, La jacquerie (1895). He also wrote the opera Jahel (1899) and the comic opera La troupe Jolicoeur (1902).

He won a prize from the Académie des Beaux-Arts for his publication De la musique en France depuis Rameau. His most popular musical work was his setting of Haï Luli, which was included in several major anthologies of French songs.
