= Symphonie espagnole =

1875 work for violin and orchestra by Édouard Lalo

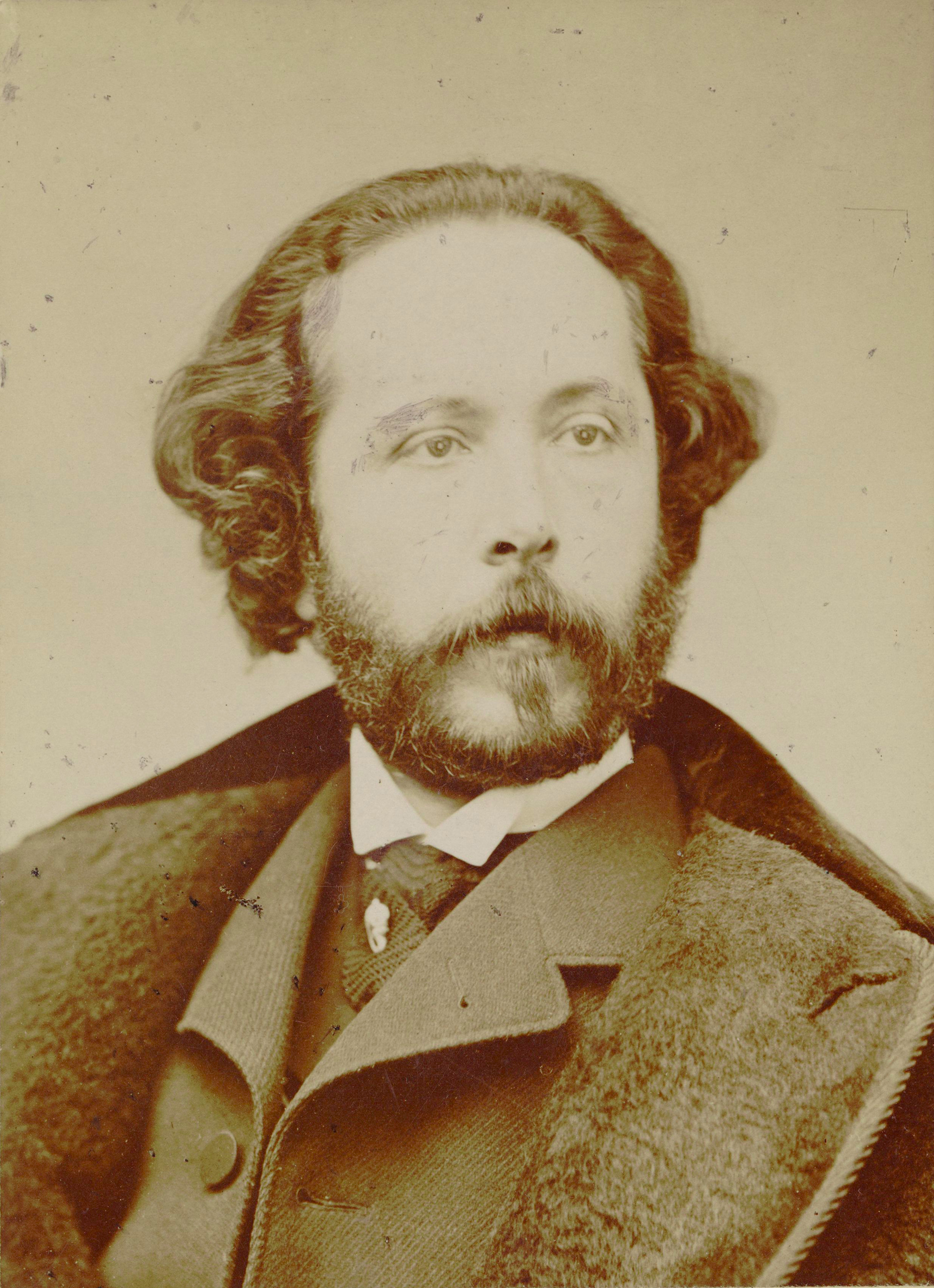
Édouard Lalo in 1865

The Symphonie espagnole in D minor, Op. 21, is a work for violin and orchestra by Édouard Lalo.

== History ==
The work was written in 1874 for violinist Pablo Sarasate, and premiered in Paris on February 7, 1875.

Although called a "Spanish Symphony" (see also Sinfonia concertante), it is considered a violin concerto by musicians today. The piece has Spanish motifs throughout, and launched a period when Spanish-themed music came into vogue. (Georges Bizet's opera Carmen premiered a month after the Symphonie espagnole.)

The Symphonie espagnole is one of Lalo's two most often played works, the other being his Cello Concerto in D minor.

The orchestra consists of a piccolo, 2 flutes, 2 oboes, 2 clarinets, 2 bassoons, 4 horns, 2 trumpets, 3 trombones, timpani, snare drum, triangle, harp, and strings.

== Structure ==
The piece has five movements:

1. Allegro non troppo
2. Scherzando: Allegro molto
3. Intermezzo: Allegretto non troppo
4. Andante
5. Rondo: Allegro

A typical performance runs just over half an hour. One of the shorter recordings, conductor Eugene Ormandy's 1967 recording with the Philadelphia Orchestra, featuring violinist Isaac Stern, runs 32 minutes and 43 seconds. It was common practice until the middle of the 20th century for performances of the work to omit the Intermezzo, leaving a four-movement work that more closely reflected the traditional structure of a symphony.

In 2026, the New York City Ballet premiered a ballet, also called "Symphonie Espagnole," choreographed by Tiler Peck to the 5-movement version of Lalo's score.

== Influence on Tchaikovsky ==
The Symphonie espagnole had some influence on the genesis of Tchaikovsky's Violin Concerto in D major. Other Russian composers like Glinka had travelled to Spain, starting a vogue among young Russian composers for the bolero and Spanish subjects. Tchaikovsky loved Mozart's "Don Giovanni" (set in Seville), heard Bizet's "Carmen" during its opening run in 1876, and later played castanets during a performance of Rimsky-Korsakov's "Capriccio Espagnol" in 1887, as reported by cellist Yulian Poplavsky, who knew Tchaikovsky at the time.

In March 1878, Tchaikovsky was staying at Nadezhda von Meck's estate at Clarens, Switzerland, while recovering from the breakdown of his disastrous marriage and his subsequent suicide attempt. His favourite pupil (and allegedly his lover), the violinist Iosif Kotek, shortly arrived from Berlin with a lot of new music for violin. His collection included the Symphonie espagnole, which he and Tchaikovsky played through to great delight. This gave Tchaikovsky the idea of writing a violin concerto, and he immediately set aside his current work on a piano sonata and started on the concerto on 17 March. With Kotek's technical help, the concerto was finished by 11 April.
