= Raoul Gunsbourg =

Opera director, impresario, composer and writer

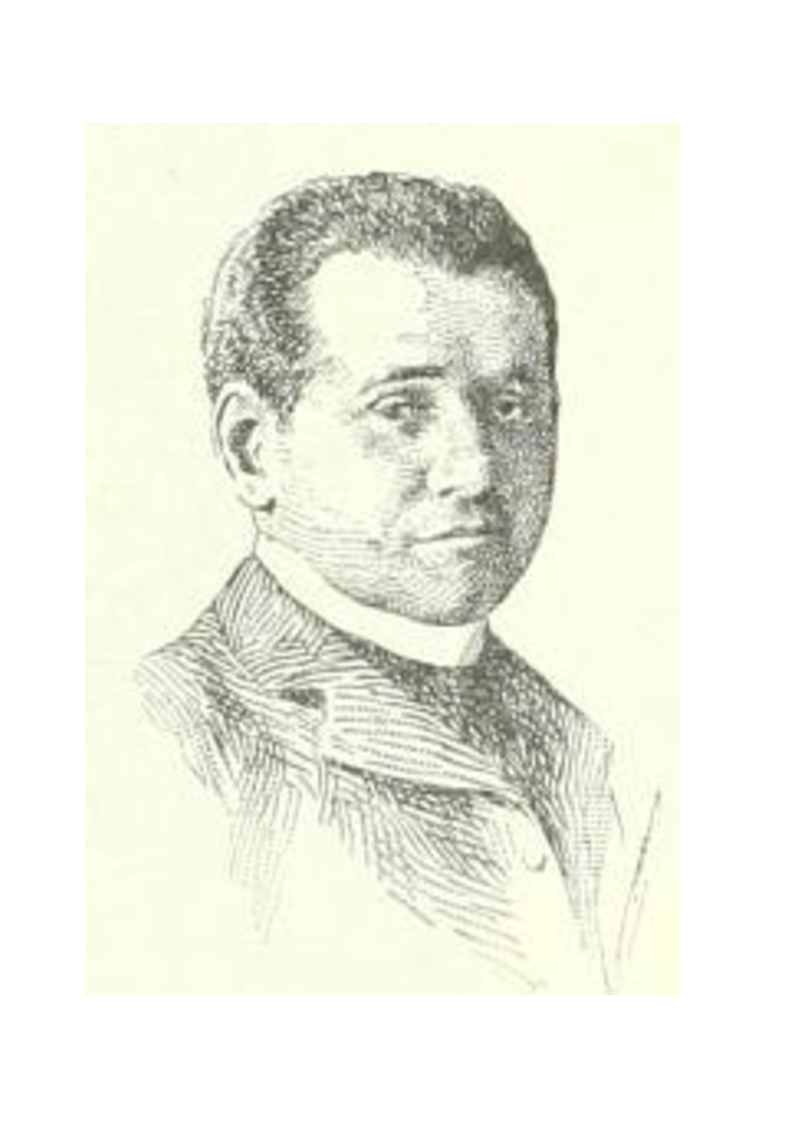
Raoul Samuel Gunsbourg

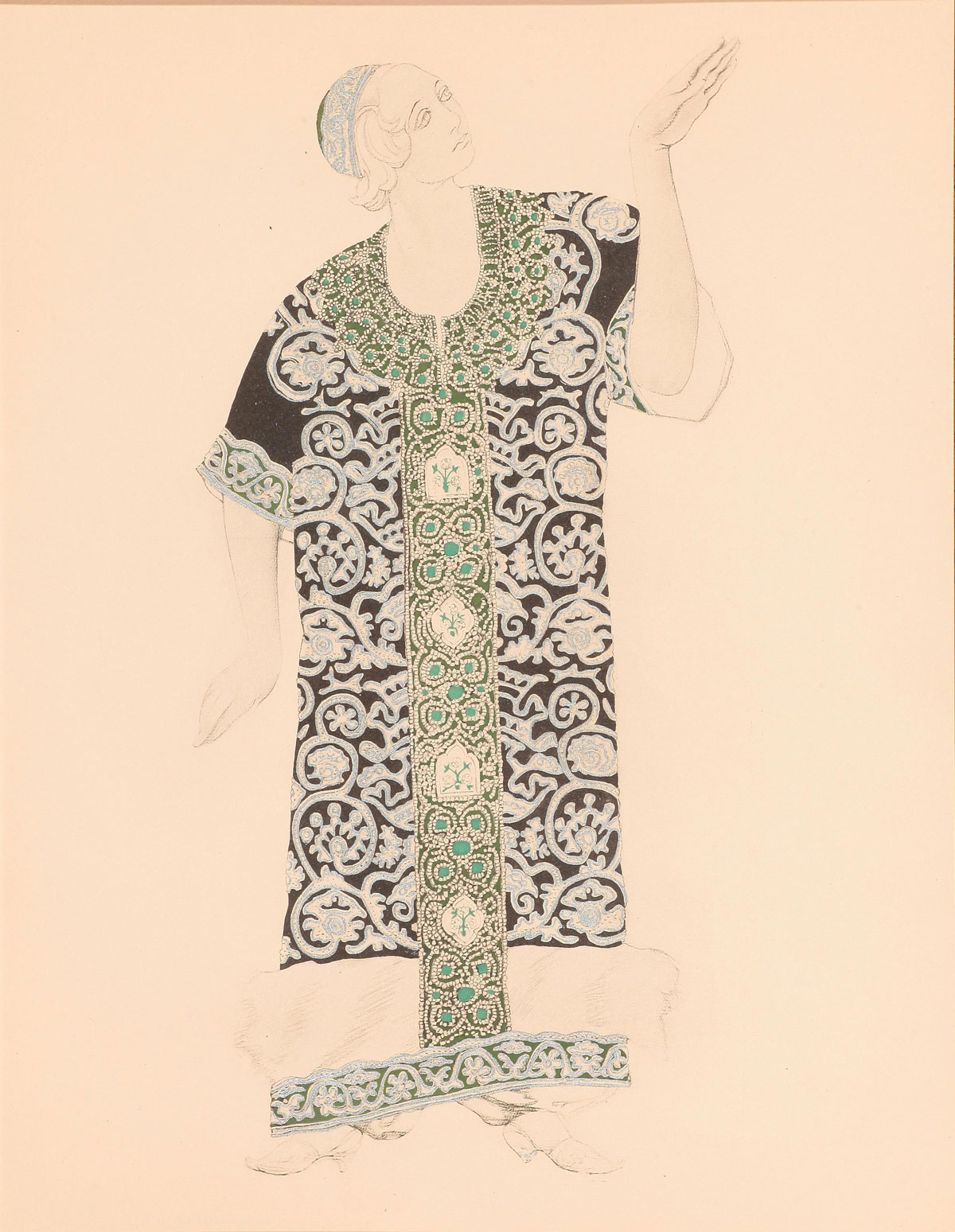
Costume design for "Ivan le Terrible" by Léon Bakst (1911)

Raoul Samuel Gunsbourg (January 6, 1860, in Bucharest – May 31, 1955, in Monte Carlo) was a Jewish-Romania-born opera director, impresario, composer and writer. Gunsbourg is best known for being the longest-serving director of the Opéra de Monte-Carlo, where his career spanned almost six decades.

Raoul Gunsbourg acquired his musical education and its comprehensive knowledge in language and literature as a self-taught person. He attended Medical School in Bucharest which he finished in 1875. In 1877-78 he served as a medic in the Russian army during the Russian-Turkish war. In 1881-83 he created and managed the Gunsbourg's French Opera Stage in Moscow and St. Petersburg. In Moscow Gunsbourg met German composer Richard Wagner. After returning to France, Gunsbourg directed the Grand Théâtre de Lille during the 1888/89 season and the Opéra de Nice in 1889-91.

In 1892, on recommendation by Tsar Alexander III of Russia, Gunsbourg was invited by Princess Alice, an American wife of Albert I, Prince of Monaco, to serve as the director of the Opéra de Monte-Carlo. Empowered by Princess Alice's encouragement and support, Gunsbourg transformed the Opéra de Monte-Carlo into a world-class cultural venue. He was the first opera director to stage Berlioz's La damnation de Faust, which was considered at that time more as an oratorio than an opera, in his theatre on February 18, 1893.

Gunsbourg's work in Monte Carlo was briefly interrupted during World War II. Assisted by members of the French Resistance, Gunsbourg fled to nearby Switzerland, escaping arrest and possible execution by the Nazis who occupied Monaco in 1943 and began the deportation of the Jewish population. After the war was over, Gunsbourg returned to Monaco where he continued directing the Opéra de Monte-Carlo until 1951.

== Stage works (operas) ==
- Le Vieil Aigle (The Old Eagle), 1 act (premiered February 13, 1909, in Monte Carlo)
- Ivan le Terrible, 3 acts (October 20, 1910, in Brussels, Théâtre de la Monnaie)
- Venise, 3 acts (March 8, 1913, in Monte Carlo)
- Maître Manole, 3 acts (March 17, 1918, in Monte Carlo)
- Satan, 9 tableaux (March 20, 1920, in Monte Carlo)
- Lysistrata, 3 acts (February 20, 1923, in Monte Carlo)
- Les Dames galantes de Brantome, 5 scenes (together with M. Thiriet and H. Tomasi) (February 12, 1946, in Monte Carlo)

== See also ==
- Gunsbourg, Raoul (1860-1955)
- Raoul Gunsbourg
- Kobbe's Complete Opera Book on Gunsbourg
- Zwischen Petersburg und Monte Carlo by Raoul Gunsbourg
- Free scores by Raoul Gunsbourg at the International Music Score Library Project (IMSLP)

== Sources ==
- Kelly, Barbara L. (2001). "Gunsbourg, Raoul". Grove Music Online.
