= Édouard Lalo =

French composer (1823–1892)

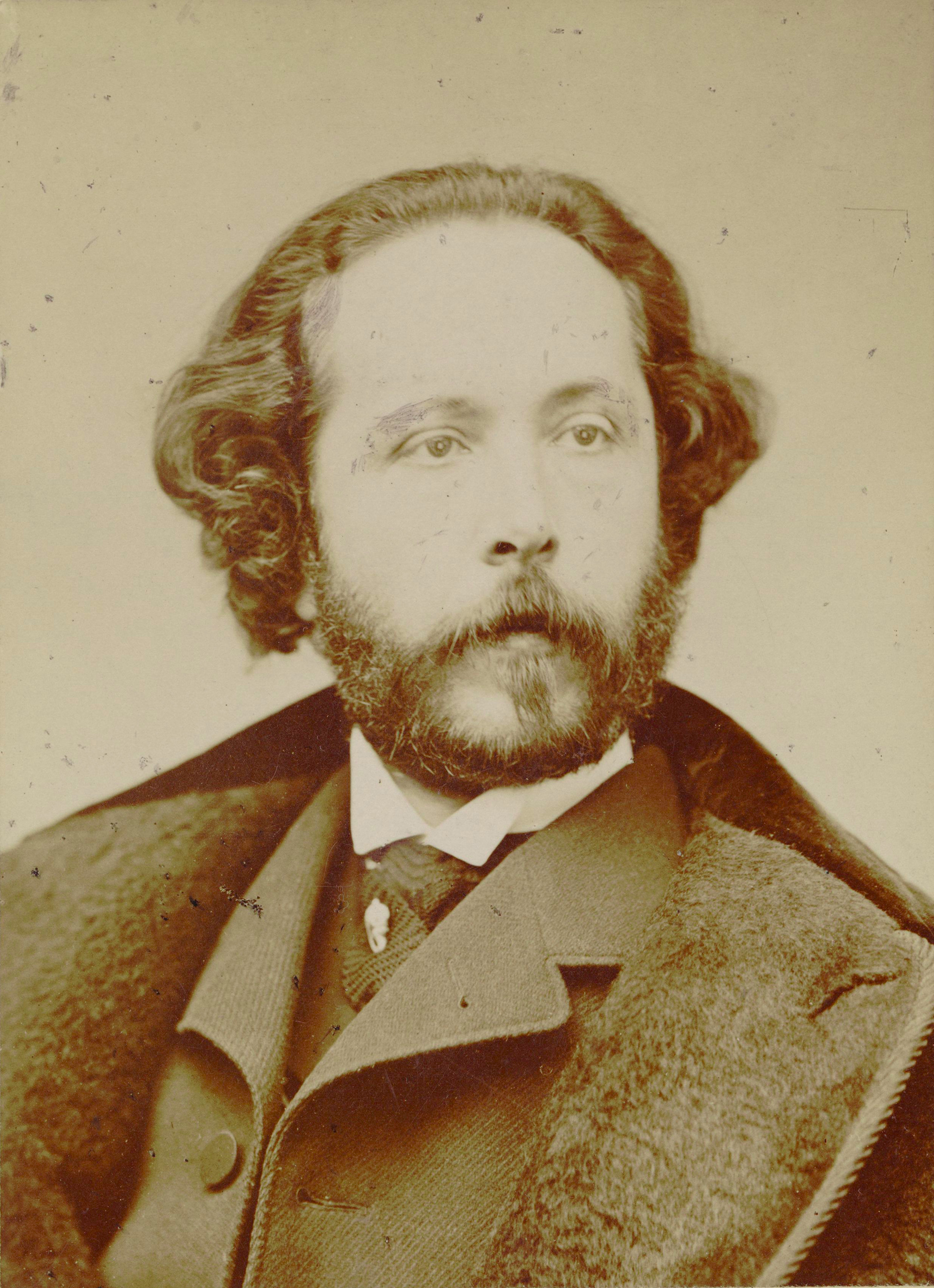
- Photograph of Lalo, c. 1865
- Born: 27 January 1823; Lille, France
- Died: 22 April 1892 (aged 69); Paris, France
- Works: List of compositions

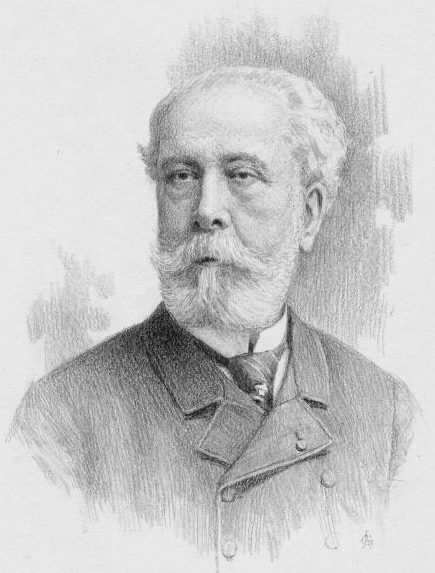
Lalo in 1891 (engraving by Richard Paraire)

Édouard-Victoire-Antoine Lalo (27 January 1823 – 22 April 1892) was a French composer, violist, violinist, and academic teacher. His most celebrated piece is the Symphonie espagnole, a five-movement concerto for violin and orchestra that remains a popular work in the standard repertoire.

== Biography ==
Lalo was born in Lille, in the northernmost part of France. He attended the conservatoire in that city in his youth. Beginning at age 16, he studied at the Paris conservatoire under François Antoine Habeneck.

For several years, Lalo worked as a string player and teacher in Paris. In 1848, he joined with friends to found the Armingaud Quartet, in which he played the viola and later, second violin. His earliest surviving compositions are songs and chamber works. Two early symphonies were destroyed.

In 1865, Lalo married Julie Besnier de Maligny, a contralto from Brittany. She encouraged Lalo's early interest in opera and led him to compose works for the stage, most notably the opera, Le roi d'Ys. Despite their originality, these works were never really popular and incurred criticism for being "too progressive" and "Wagnerian". This reception led Lalo to dedicate most of his career to the composition of chamber music, which was gradually coming into vogue in France, as well as to composing works for orchestra.

Lalo's distinctive style has earned him a degree of popularity. Symphonie espagnole for violin and orchestra still enjoys a prominent place in the repertoire of violinists. The Cello Concerto in D minor is revived occasionally. His Symphony in G minor was a favourite of Sir Thomas Beecham and has occasionally been championed by later conductors.

His music is notable for its strong melodies and colourful orchestration, with a Germanic solidity that distinguishes him from other French composers of his era. Such works as the Scherzo in D minor, one of his most colourful pieces, embody his distinctive style and strong expressive bent.

Le Roi d'Ys, an opera based on the Breton legend of Ys, is Lalo's most complex and ambitious creation. (This same legend inspired Claude Debussy's "La cathédrale engloutie".) Le Roi d'Ys was not initially considered performable and was not staged until 1888, when Lalo was 65 years old.

Lalo became a member of the Legion of Honour in 1873. He died in Paris in 1892, leaving several unfinished works, including his opera, La jacquerie, which was completed by Arthur Coquard. He was interred at the Père Lachaise Cemetery.

Lalo's son Pierre (6 September 1866 – 9 June 1943) was a music critic who wrote for Le Temps and other French periodicals from 1898 until his death.

== References in modern culture ==
In 1962, composer Maurice Jarre used a theme from Lalo's Piano Concerto for the exotic score to Lawrence of Arabia.

English progressive rock group The Nice used a melody from Lalo's Symphonie espagnole for its recording "Diary of an Empty Day" that is found on its third album Nice. Most of the lyrics are concerned with the inability of the writer to "find words for this music".

Part of Lalo's Cello Concerto in D minor was used in the second season of Mozart in the Jungle.
