= Jacques Bizet =

French physician and businessman (1872–1922)

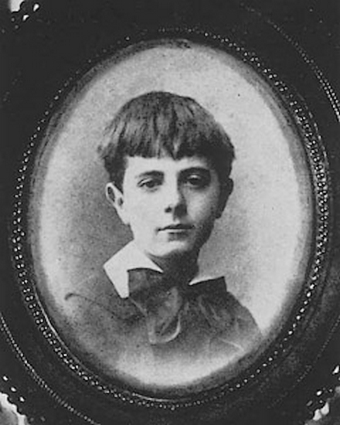
- Bizet, c. 1882
- Born: 10 July 1872; Paris, France
- Died: 3 November 1922 (aged 50); Paris, France
- Education: Lycée Condorcet; University of Paris
- Occupations: Physician; Company Director
- Spouses: Madeleine Bréguet (m. 1898; died 1900); Alice Franckel (m. 1904; div. 1919)
- Parents: Georges Bizet (father); Geneviève Halévy (mother)

Jacques Bizet (French: [ʒak bizɛ]; 10 July 1872 – 3 November 1922) was a French physician and businessman best known for his long friendship with novelist Marcel Proust. He was the son of composer Georges Bizet, who died when the boy was three and before his works gained success. His mother was Geneviève Halévy, who became known as a literary hostess of salons.

== Biography ==
Bizet was born in Paris to composer Georges Bizet and his wife Geneviève Halévy. He was named for his father's patron and his cousin and grandfather, Jacques-Fromental Halévy. He was of Portuguese-Jewish descent through his mother.

Georges Bizet died suddenly when the boy was three, and he became particularly close to his mother. About ten years later, she remarried in 1886. Her second husband was Émile Straus (1844–1929), a wealthy lawyer and passionate art collector. According to one source, when someone asked the vivacious widowed socialite why on earth she had married the ill-tempered balding attorney, she replied that it had been "the only way to get rid of him".

Geneviève Straus ran a lively literary and arts salon, which helped to stave off the depression towards which she tended. Her son seemed to have inherited that tendency. While she was hosting the salon, Jacques came to know many of the Parisian artistic and literary celebrities of the day.

His father Georges Bizet had been virtually unknown at the time of his death, but the posthumous success of his work, and in particular the huge success of his opera Carmen, meant that by the time Jacques was enrolled at an exclusive primary school, he was known as the son of a famous composer. His school followed the curriculum created by Marie Pape-Carpantier. Bizet's cousin and contemporary Daniel Halévy started at the same school at the same time: he was a large child and soon established himself as the school bully. Another student, a year senior to the cousins, but physically relatively puny, was Marcel Proust. In some ways all three boys had similar backgrounds: at a time when racial identity was becoming an issue in society, they would all have been regarded as half-Jewish. The parents of each boy had him baptised into Christian churches.

When the time came for secondary school, the cousins moved on to the prestigious Lycée Condorcet. Contemporaries who later achieved a measure of notability included Robert Dreyfus and Fernand Gregh. One year ahead, as before, was Marcel Proust. The relationships between the cousins and the future novelist were affected by Proust's curiously guileless homosexuality. He wrote a succession of letters to the cousins expressing his feelings with an openness that shocked and unsettled them. There was no sense that his feelings of attraction were ever reciprocated. The result in the immediate term seems to have been that, more than ever, Proust became a target of mocking, mistreatment and bullying by Bizet, Halévy and the gang that formed around them. In his diary entry on a poem by Proust which he perceived as homoerotic, the young Daniel Halévy confided that he thought Proust "more gifted than anyone", but the talented poet was also "young and weak, [and] not enough of a boy for us". At one point Geneviève Straus became so exasperated by Proust's homoerotic fixation on her son and his cousin, that she refused to allow the gifted young writer admission to the literary salon that doubled as her family home.

The relationship between the cousins and Proust was sustained by other, more positive ways. Proust seems to have been somewhat in awe of the cousins' family connections and social prominence. Daniel's father, Ludovic Halévy, was a versatile author and dramatist whose fame among Parisian intellectuals at the time would have been quite as great as that of composer Georges Bizet. As a teenager Proust may already have become aware of how he could make use of the physical, psychological and behavioural traits of his school contemporaries and their family members in his future novels. For their part, Halévy and Bizet were awed by Proust's precocious and formidable talent. Their family backgrounds predisposed them to a love for literature: they were not without their own ambitions in that respect.

By the time the boys left school, they had stopped the bullying. As adults the three were each destined to inhabit the same haute-bourgeois milieu of Parisian intellectuals: the friendship between Marcel Proust and Jacques Bizet would endure. Before that, while still at school Halévy and Bizet teamed up to found two small-scale literary reviews, Revue Verte and Revue Lilas. Proust and Gregh joined in with the projects. Three years later Fernand Gregh founded another review magazine, Le Banquet, which was published monthly between March 1892 and March 1893. Leading members of the twentieth-century literary establishment were among the contributors, including Gaston Arman de Caillavet, Robert de Flers, Daniel Halévy and Marcel Proust. Another contributor, Léon Blum, later became Prime Minister of France. Jacques Bizet wrote a number of the articles. The sudden closure of Le Banquet after only a year came as a surprise. Bizet wrote several subsequently forgotten theatre pieces, influenced by the plays of Pierre de Marivaux and Oscar Wilde.

=== Beginning of medical studies ===
By the end of 1893, however, while still rebutting the unwanted advances of his friend Marcel Proust, Bizet had distanced himself from the literary scene. He enrolled at the University of Paris as a medical student. Daniel Halévy (1872–1962) developed as an essayist-historian.

The study of medicine did not cause Bizet entirely to break away from the world of the arts. During his second and, as matters turned out, final student year, he joined with Jacques-Émile Blanche to set up a shadow play review. By this time Proust's exclusion from Geneviève Straus's salon had long since been rescinded. Proust was among the "men of letters" who frequented her home. According to several commentators, there he found a rich pool of characters from who he would draw for his novels, without much modifying their habits and features.

In the increasingly politicised atmosphere of the times, the liberal members of the salon were ardently pro-Dreyfus. Their hostess was half-Jewish, and her husband was Jewish, and rumored to be an illegitimate or natural half-brother to the Rothschild brothers. Like Proust, Bizet signed the famous pro-Dreyfus petition which appeared in Le Temps on 15 January 1898, in response to Émile Zola's incendiary open letter under the headline "J'Accuse...!", which had been published in L'Aurore two days earlier.

The heightened political and social polarisation provoked by the Dreyfus affair was followed by a decline in popularity for the salon of Émile Straus. People avoided being seen in the company of those who had taken an opposite position in the affair. A few years later, in 1902, Bizet was provoked into challenging dramaturge André Picard to a duel. A tragic denouement was narrowly avoided.

=== Bizet and the auto industry ===
Meanwhile the motor industry was booming. In 1903 France remained the world's leading automaker, producing 30,124 cars (nearly 49% of the world total) as against 11,235 cars produced in the USA. Bizet joined the bandwagon, becoming a director of "Taximètres Unic de Monaco", a substantial taxi business that had been founded by the Rothschilds. Proust became one of the company's most devoted customers, taking long taxi trips into the Normandy countryside. It provided the backdrop for some of his best known novels. As a result, Proust came to know Alfred Agostinelli, who in 1913 exchanged the life of a taxi driver for a job as Proust's secretary-stenographer. Some sources indicate that in making the appointment, Proust decided mostly on romantic considerations. Proust scholars consider Agostinelli to be the model for the character of "Albertine", who features prominently in several volumes of "À la recherche du temps perdu".

Bizet also worked with Paris automobile manufacturer Georges Richard, who was extensively funded by the Rothschilds. According to one source, Bizet ran a dealership selling cars for Richard. In 1905 the two men teamed up (with others) to launch Unic cars. Through Georges Richard, Bizet met industrialist Jules Salomon.

In 1909 Salomon left to set up business independently of Richard: Bizet joined with him to establish the automobile manufacturer known as Le Zèbre. Salomon was the engineer-entrepreneur while Bizet was the principal source of funds for the enterprise.

Over the next few years Bizet became increasingly irascible. In 1912, he had a duel with Count Hubert de Pierredon after they had a violent confrontation, but neither caused the other lasting damage.

Two years later, after the outbreak of the Great War, Bizet served as a military physician at the Saint-Martin Hospital. Later during the war he managed a munitions factory.

== Personal life ==
On 1 June 1898 Jacques Bizet had married a distant cousin, Madeleine Camille Breguet, in Paris. She died on 15 October 1900 while undergoing an operation by surgeon-gynecologist Samuel Jean de Pozzi. (He was a former lover of Bizet's mother.)

Several years later Bizet married again in 1904, to Alice Franckel. She had also been married before. Born in Hamburg, at some time she moved to Paris. In 1919 the Bizet couple divorced without having children.

According to at least one source, Bizet had been crushed emotionally by the loss of his father and disruption of his early family life. During his final years he became an alcoholic and morphine addict. He committed suicide, fatally shooting himself, ostensibly over matters involving his mistress. As it happened, a couple of weeks later, his longtime friend Marcel Proust died of illness.
