= Roma Symphony (Bizet) =

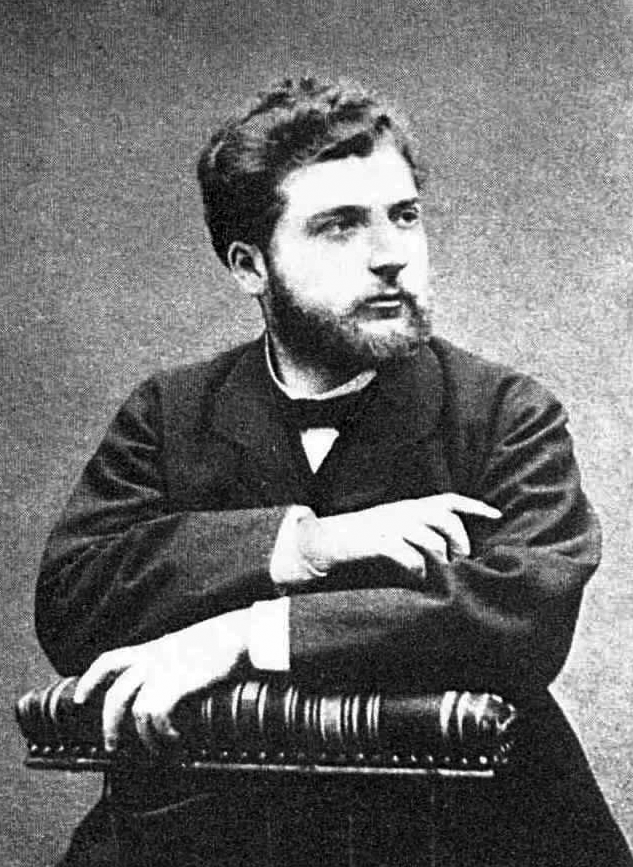
Georges Bizet photographed in about 1860

The Fantaisie symphonique in C, called Souvenirs de Rome, is the second of Georges Bizet's symphonies. Unlike his First, also in C major and written quickly at the age of 17, Souvenirs de Rome took more than a decade to compose: he began it at age 22, had largely finished it at 33, but was never fully satisfied, revising it repeatedly, and he died at 36 years of age without having reached a definitive version. All four of its movements were performed during Bizet's lifetime, but not on the same occasion; not until 1875 was the full work in its last revision premiered. Perhaps because of Bizet's dissatisfaction, Souvenirs de Rome is often described as "unfinished", but is a complete work and fully scored.

== Background ==
Bizet won the Prix de Rome in 1857, which allowed him to spend the following two years studying free of charge at the French Academy in Rome, followed by a year studying in Germany. He never went to Germany, but stayed in Rome until July 1860. Rather than returning to Paris straight away, he did some touring through Italy, seeing places he had not visited in his earlier travels in 1858 and 1859. In Rimini he first planned a symphony with each of the four movements dedicated to a different Italian city – Rome (opening movement), Venice (Andante), Florence (Scherzo) and Naples (finale). He may have made some early sketches at this time. When he got to Venice he learned that his mother was seriously ill, so he returned home immediately.

By 1861, he had written the Scherzo, still generally considered the best movement of the work. It was performed privately in November 1861, and received a public performance on 11 January 1863, conducted by Jules Pasdeloup at the Cirque Napoléon, at which Camille Saint-Saëns was present. It was poorly performed and provoked a hostile reaction from many concert subscribers. Nevertheless, it was given another performance on 18 January at the Société Nationale des Beaux-Arts, and this time received a much more positive reaction.

By 1866, he had written his first version of the complete work, in which the first movement was a Theme and Variations, but he was dissatisfied and set about undertaking a total revision. In 1868, he revised it yet again. Three movements of the revised score, minus the Scherzo, were performed on 28 February 1869, under the title Fantaisie symphonique: Souvenirs de Rome, again conducted by Pasdeloup. The movements were given the programmatic titles Une chasse dans la Forêt d'Ostie, Une Procession and Carnaval à Rome (this was the movement meant to depict Naples). But Bizet was still not happy, and proceeded to revise it once more. By 1871, he seems to have dropped work on his revisions, being focused on other projects.

The full symphony in its latest known version was premiered after his death, in 1875. The work was published in 1880 as Roma, and it probably incorporates some of his changes made in 1871.

== Title ==
In form, the work stands somewhere between a symphony and a symphonic suite. Grove's Dictionary says: "It is not sufficiently explicit for programme music and too carelessly constructed for an abstract symphony". Despite Bizet's description of it as a "symphony", it has often been classified in reference works as a suite. In some sources, it is even numbered as "Symphonic Suite No. 3". Another reason for the alternative title is that his earlier symphony was in the same key, C major, and it was believed by some that calling his second symphonic venture a suite would be less confusing. However, this renaming could only have occurred after 1935 (60 years after Bizet's death), when the very existence of his first symphony, the Symphony in C, was made known to the world for the first time.

== The work ==
Roma is a very uneven work. The Scherzo is usually singled out as its best movement, full of liveliness and grace. The outer movements contain both brilliance and academic pedantry, and the slow movement is not generally well regarded, sometimes being described as "ponderous and boring". However, Gustav Mahler thought highly enough of Roma to conduct the Vienna premiere in 1898–99, and to expose American audiences to it on his 1910 tour. Its actual United States premiere was on 11 November 1880 at the Metropolitan Concert Hall, conducted by Theodore Thomas. The New York Times critic of the time said that, while there was much in the work to admire, it was crude in arrangement and had an air of incompleteness about it.

== Structure ==
The four movements of Roma are:

1. Andante tranquillo, leading to an Allegro agitato (C major)
2. Scherzo – Allegretto vivace (A♭ major)
3. Andante molto (F major)
4. Allegro vivacissimo (Finale).

The work takes about 31 minutes to play.

== Recordings ==
It has been recorded a number of times, under conductors such as Sir Thomas Beecham, Lamberto Gardelli, Louis Frémaux, Michel Plasson, Jean-Claude Casadesus, Enrique Batiz and Fuat Mansurov.

The Finale has sometimes been recorded separately, under the title "Carnaval", or "Carnaval à Rome".
