= Georges Bizet =

French composer (1838–1875)

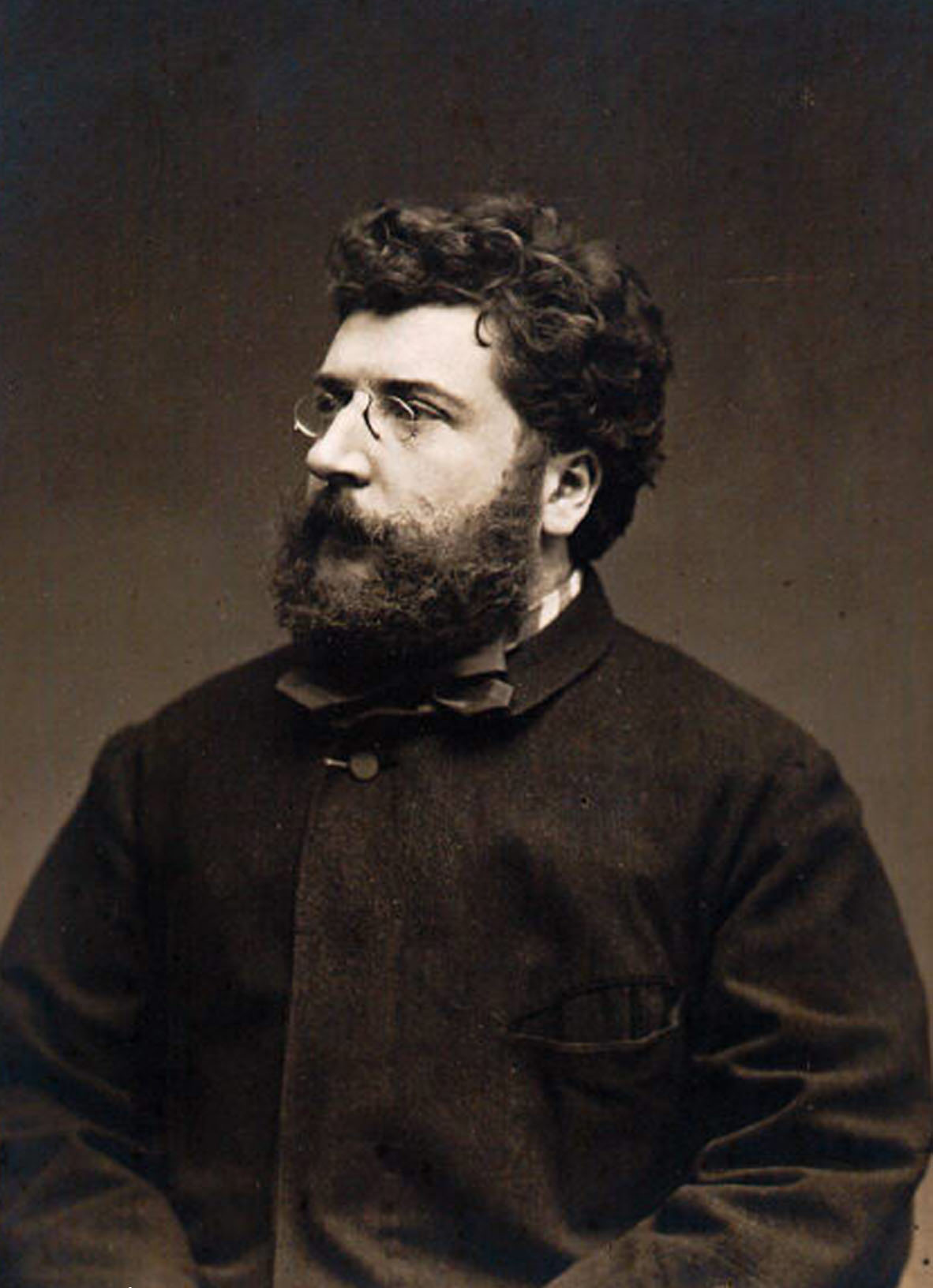
Bizet photographed by Étienne Carjat (1875)

Georges Bizet (Note: Pronunciation: UK: /ˈbiːzeɪ/ BEE-zay, US: /biːˈzeɪ/ bee-ZAY; French: [ʒɔʁʒ(ə) bizɛ]) (né Alexandre César Léopold Bizet; 25 October 1838 – 3 June 1875) was a French composer of the Romantic era. Best known for his operas in a career cut short by his early death, Bizet achieved few successes before his final work, Carmen, which has become one of the most popular and frequently performed works in the entire opera repertoire.

During a brilliant student career at the Conservatoire de Paris, Bizet won many prizes, including the prestigious Prix de Rome in 1857. He was recognised as an outstanding pianist, though he chose not to capitalise on this skill and rarely performed in public. Returning to Paris after almost three years in Italy, he found that the main Parisian opera theatres preferred the established classical repertoire to the works of newcomers. His keyboard and orchestral compositions were likewise largely ignored; as a result, his career stalled, and he earned his living mainly by arranging and transcribing the music of others. Restless for success, he began many theatrical projects during the 1860s, most of which were abandoned. Neither of his two operas that reached the stage in this time—Les pêcheurs de perles and La jolie fille de Perth—were immediately successful.

After the Franco-Prussian War of 1870–1871, during which Bizet served in the National Guard, he had little success with his one-act opera Djamileh, though an orchestral suite derived from his incidental music to Alphonse Daudet's play L'Arlésienne was instantly popular. The production of his final opera, Carmen, was delayed because of fears that its themes of betrayal and murder would offend audiences. After its premiere on 3 March 1875, Bizet was convinced that the work was a failure; he died of a heart attack three months later, unaware that it would prove a spectacular and enduring success.

Bizet's marriage to Geneviève Halévy was intermittently happy and produced one son. After his death, his work, apart from Carmen, was generally neglected. Manuscripts were given away or lost, and published versions of his works were frequently revised and adapted by other hands. He founded no school and had no obvious disciples or successors. After years of neglect, his works began to be performed more frequently in the 20th century. Later commentators have acclaimed him as a composer of brilliance and originality whose premature death was a significant loss to French musical theatre.

== Life ==
=== Early years ===
==== Family background and childhood ====
Georges Bizet was born in Paris on 25 October 1838. He was registered as Alexandre César Léopold, but baptised as "Georges" on 16 March 1840, and was known by this name for the rest of his life. His father, Adolphe Bizet, had been a hairdresser and wigmaker before becoming a singing teacher despite his lack of formal training. He also composed a few works, including at least one published song. In 1837, Adolphe married Aimée Delsarte, against the wishes of her family who considered him a poor prospect; the Delsartes, though impoverished, were a cultured and highly musical family. Aimée was an accomplished pianist, while her brother François Delsarte was a distinguished singer and teacher who performed at the courts of both Louis Philippe and Napoleon III. François Delsarte's wife Rosine, a musical prodigy, had been an assistant professor of solfège at the Conservatoire de Paris at the age of 13. At least one author has suggested that Aimée was from a Jewish family, but this is not substantiated in any of Georges' official biographies.

Georges, an only child, showed early aptitude for music and quickly picked up the basics of musical notation from his mother, who probably gave him his first piano lessons. By listening at the door of the room where Adolphe conducted his classes, Georges learned to sing difficult songs accurately from memory and developed an ability to identify and analyse complex chordal structures. This precocity convinced his ambitious parents that he was ready to begin studying at the Conservatoire even though he was still only nine years old (the minimum entry age was 10). Georges was interviewed by Joseph Meifred, the horn virtuoso who was a member of the Conservatoire's Committee of Studies. Meifred was so struck by the boy's demonstration of his skills that he waived the age rule and offered to take him as soon as a place became available.

==== Conservatoire ====
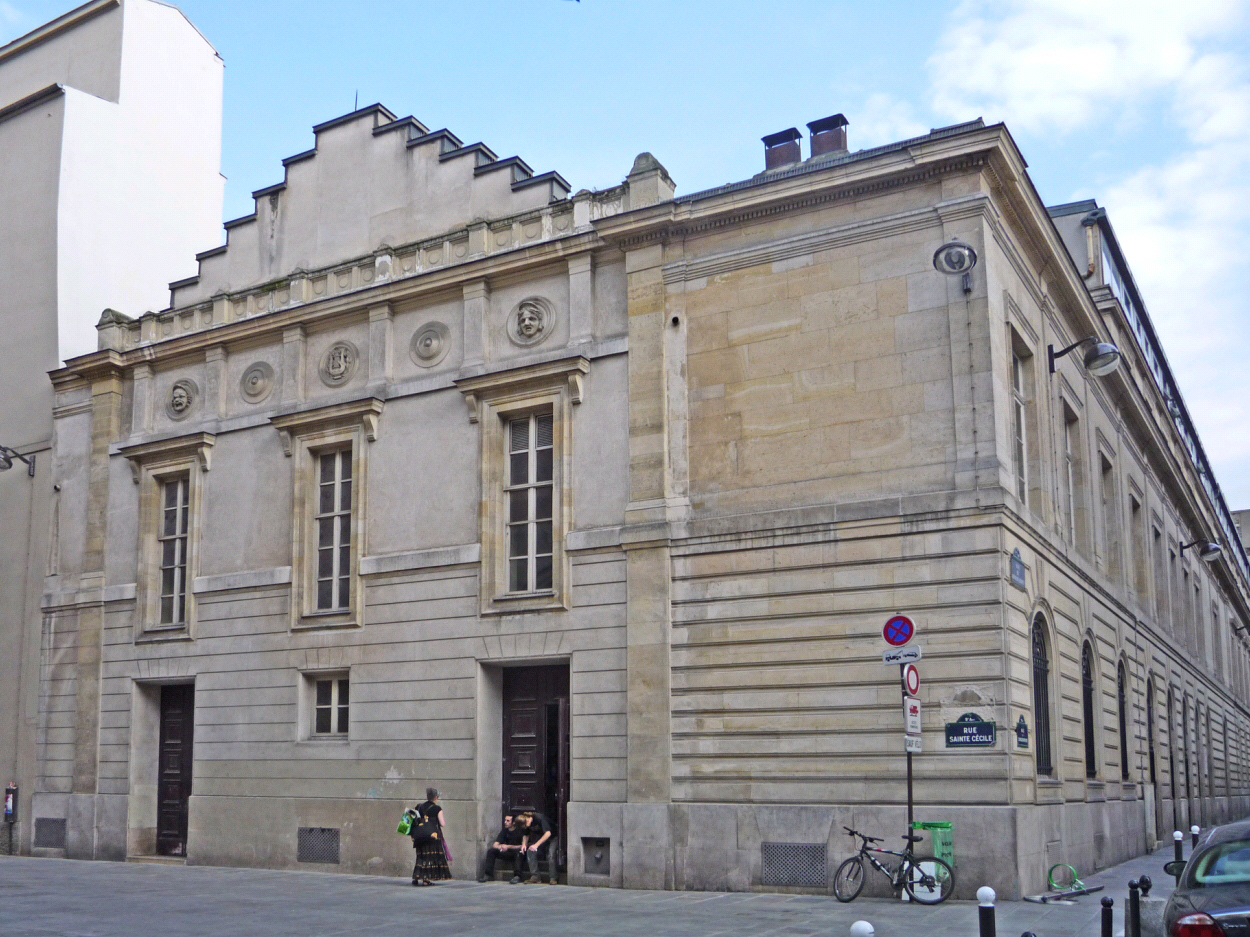
Part of the Paris Conservatoire, where Bizet studied from 1848 to 1857 (photographed in 2009)

Bizet was admitted to the Conservatoire on 9 October 1848, two weeks before his 10th birthday. He made an early impression; within six months he had won first prize in solfège, a feat that impressed Pierre-Joseph-Guillaume Zimmerman, the Conservatoire's former professor of piano. Zimmerman gave Bizet private lessons in counterpoint and fugue, which continued until the old man's death in 1853. Through these classes, Bizet met Zimmerman's son-in-law, the composer Charles Gounod, who became a lasting influence on the young pupil's musical style—although their relationship was often strained in later years. He also met another of Gounod's young students, the 13-year-old Camille Saint-Saëns, who remained a firm friend of Bizet's. Under the tuition of Antoine François Marmontel, the Conservatoire's professor of piano, Bizet's pianism developed rapidly; he won the Conservatoire's second prize for piano in 1851, and first prize the following year. Bizet would later write to Marmontel: "In your class one learns something besides the piano; one becomes a musician".

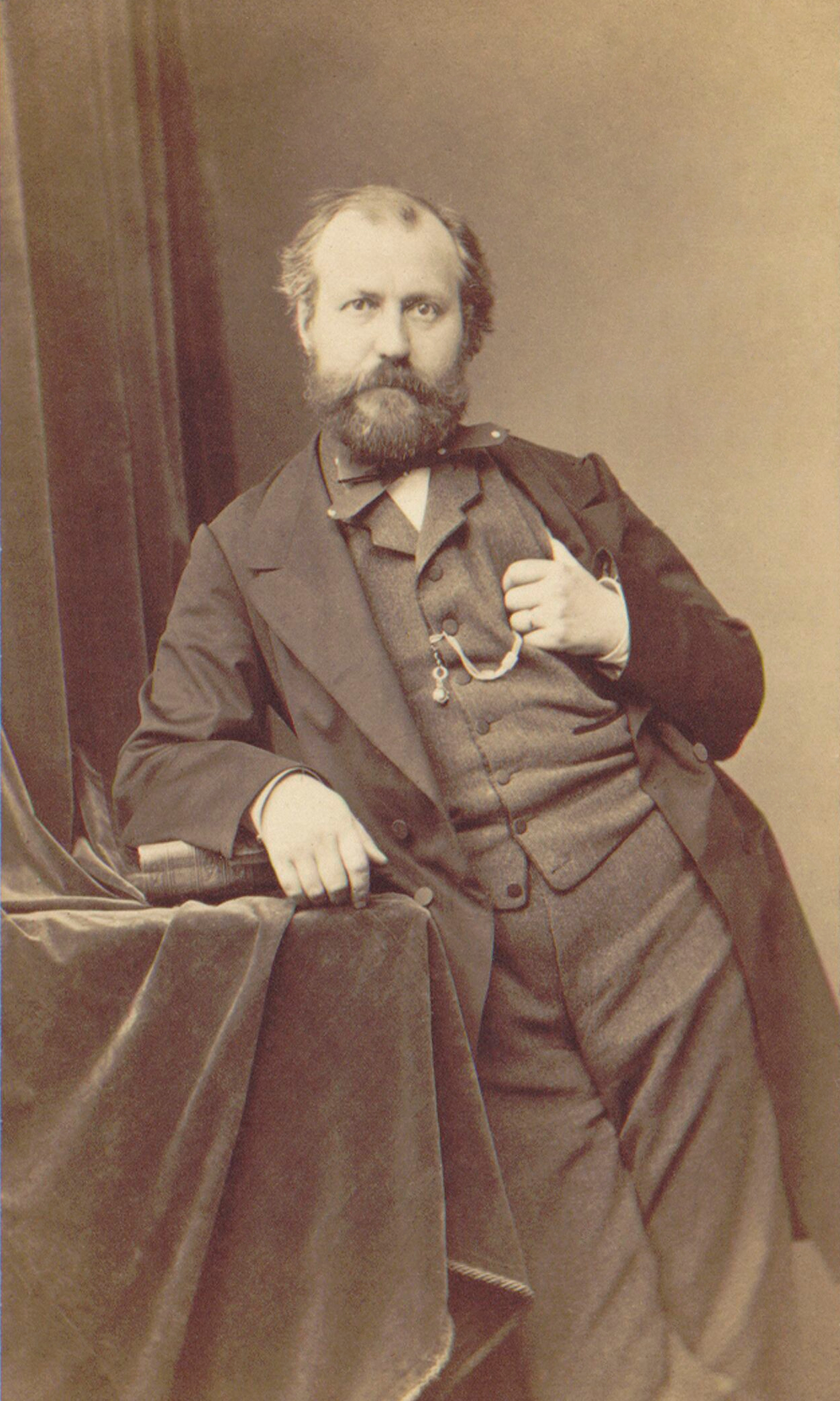
Charles Gounod, a mentor and inspiration to Bizet in the latter's Conservatoire years

Bizet's first preserved compositions, two wordless songs for soprano, date from around 1850. In 1853, he joined Fromental Halévy's composition class and began to produce works of increasing sophistication and quality. Two of his songs, "Petite Marguerite" and "La Rose et l'abeille", were published in 1854. In 1855, he wrote an ambitious overture for a large orchestra, and prepared four-hand piano versions of two of Gounod's works: the opera La nonne sanglante and the Symphony in D. Bizet's work on the Gounod symphony inspired him, shortly after his seventeenth birthday, to write his own symphony, which bore a close resemblance to Gounod's—note for note in some passages. Bizet never published the symphony, which came to light again only in 1933, and was finally performed in 1935.

In 1856, Bizet competed for the prestigious Prix de Rome. His entry was not successful, but nor were any of the others; the musician's prize was not awarded that year. After this rebuff, Bizet entered an opera competition which Jacques Offenbach had organised for young composers, with a prize of 1,200 francs. The challenge was to set the one-act libretto of Le docteur Miracle by Léon Battu and Ludovic Halévy. The prize was awarded jointly to Bizet and Charles Lecocq, a compromise which years later Lecocq criticised on the grounds of the jury's manipulation by Fromental Halévy in favour of Bizet. (Note: Lecocq wrote: "Bizet's score was not bad, but rather heavy, and he failed with almost all of the little couplets I was able to bring off". Mina Curtiss suggests that this pique reflected Lecocq's general disappointment with a career in which theatrical success largely eluded him.) As a result of his success, Bizet became a regular guest at Offenbach's Friday evening parties, where among other musicians he met the aged Gioachino Rossini, who presented the young man with a signed photograph. (Note: Although Bizet was initially flattered to be part of Offenbach's circle, and relished the contacts he made at the Friday gatherings, he became resentful of the hold which the older composer had established over French musical theatre, and grew contemptuous of his music. In a letter to Paul Lacombe in 1871 Bizet refers to "the ever-increasing invasion of that infernal Offenbach", and dismisses Offenbach's work as "trash" and "this obscenity".) Bizet was a great admirer of Rossini's music, and wrote not long after their first meeting that "Rossini is the greatest of them all, because like Mozart, he has all the virtues".

For his 1857 Prix de Rome entry, Bizet, with Gounod's enthusiastic approval, chose to set the cantata Clovis et Clotilde by Amédée Burion. Bizet was awarded the prize after a ballot of the members of the Académie des Beaux-Arts overturned the judges' initial decision, which was in favour of the oboist Charles Colin. Under the terms of the award, Bizet received a financial grant for five years, the first two to be spent in Rome, the third in Germany and the final two in Paris. The only other requirement was the submission each year of an "envoi", a piece of original work to the satisfaction of the Académie. Before his departure for Rome in December 1857, Bizet's prize cantata was performed at the Académie to an enthusiastic reception.

=== Rome, 1858–1860 ===
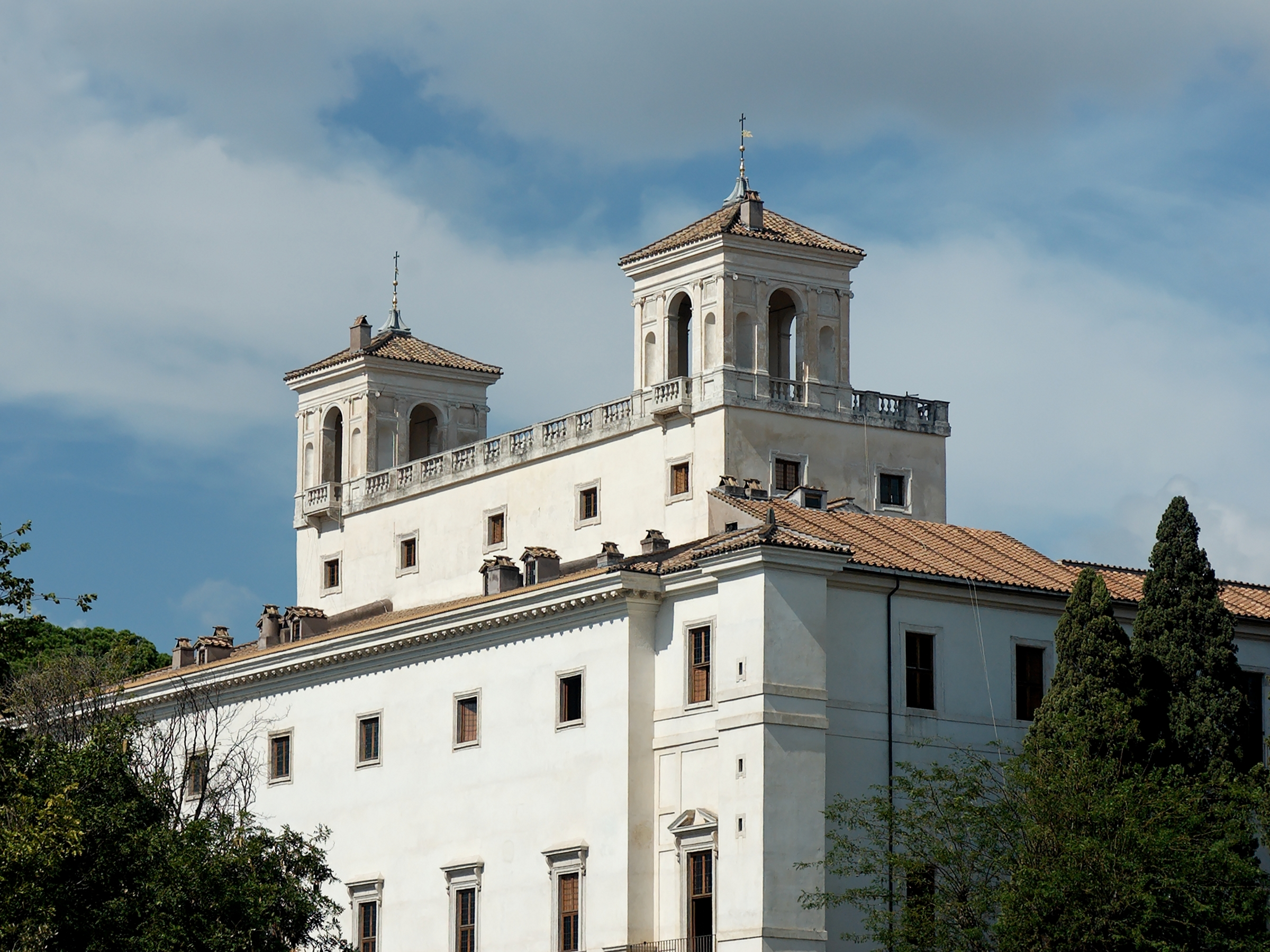
The Villa Medici, the official home of the French Académie in Rome since 1803

On 27 January 1858, Bizet arrived at the Villa Medici, a 16th-century palace that since 1803 had housed the French Académie in Rome and which he described in a letter home as "paradise". Under its director, the painter Jean-Victor Schnetz, the villa provided an ideal environment in which Bizet and his fellow-laureates could pursue their artistic endeavours. Bizet relished the convivial atmosphere, and quickly involved himself in the distractions of its social life; in his first six months in Rome, his only composition was a Te Deum written for the Rodrigues Prize, a competition for a new religious work open to Prix de Rome winners. This piece failed to impress the judges, who awarded the prize to Adrien Barthe, the only other entrant. Bizet was discouraged to the extent that he vowed to write no more religious music. His Te Deum remained forgotten and unpublished until 1971.

Through the winter of 1858–59, Bizet worked on his first envoi, an opera buffa setting of Carlo Cambiaggio's libretto Don Procopio. Under the terms of his prize, Bizet's first envoi was supposed to be a mass, but after his Te Deum experience, he was averse to writing religious music. He was apprehensive about how this breach of the rules would be received at the Académie, but their response to Don Procopio was initially positive, with praise for the composer's "easy and brilliant touch" and "youthful and bold style".

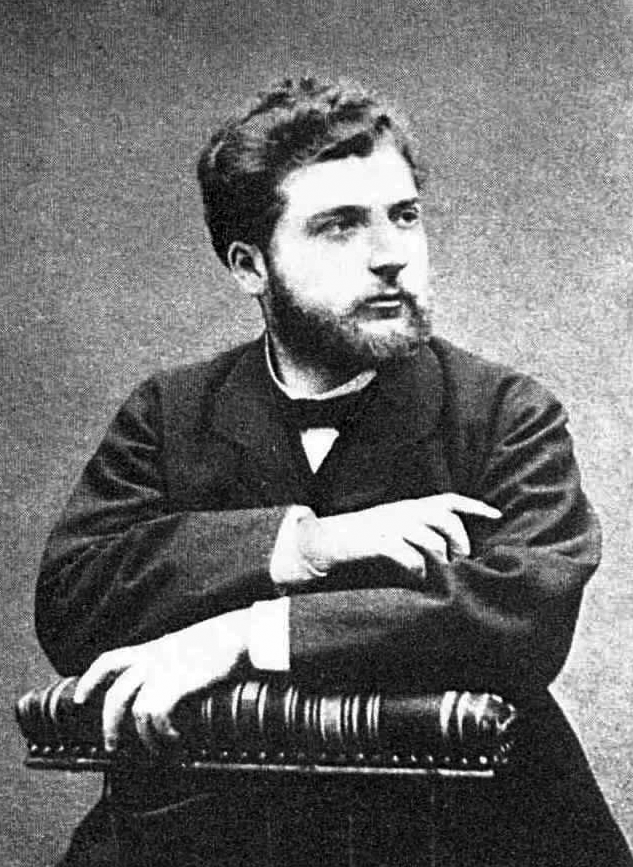
Georges Bizet photographed in about 1860

For his second envoi, not wishing to test the Académie's tolerance too far, Bizet proposed to submit a quasi-religious work in the form of a secular mass on a text by Horace. This work, entitled Carmen Saeculare, was intended as a song to Apollo and Diana. No trace exists, and it is unlikely that Bizet ever started it. A tendency to conceive ambitious projects, only to quickly abandon them, became a feature of Bizet's Rome years; in addition to Carmen Saeculare, he considered and discarded at least five opera projects, two attempts at a symphony, and a symphonic ode on the theme of Ulysses and Circe. After Don Procopio, Bizet completed only one further work in Rome, the symphonic poem Vasco da Gama. This replaced Carmen Saeculare as his second envoi, and was well received by the Académie, though swiftly forgotten thereafter.

In the summer of 1859, Bizet and several companions travelled in the mountains and forests around Anagni and Frosinone. They also visited a convict settlement at Anzio; Bizet sent an enthusiastic letter to Marmontel, recounting his experiences. In August, he made an extended journey south to Naples and Pompeii, where he was unimpressed with the former but delighted with the latter: "Here you live with the ancients; you see their temples, their theatres, their houses in which you find their furniture, their kitchen utensils..." Bizet began sketching a symphony based on his Italian experiences, but made little immediate headway; the project, which became his Roma symphony, was not finished until 1868. On his return to Rome, Bizet successfully requested permission to extend his stay in Italy into a third year, rather than going to Germany, so that he could complete "an important work" (which has not been identified). In September 1860, while visiting Venice with his friend and fellow-laureate Ernest Guiraud, Bizet received news that his mother was gravely ill in Paris, and made his way home.

=== Emergent composer ===
==== Paris, 1860–1863 ====
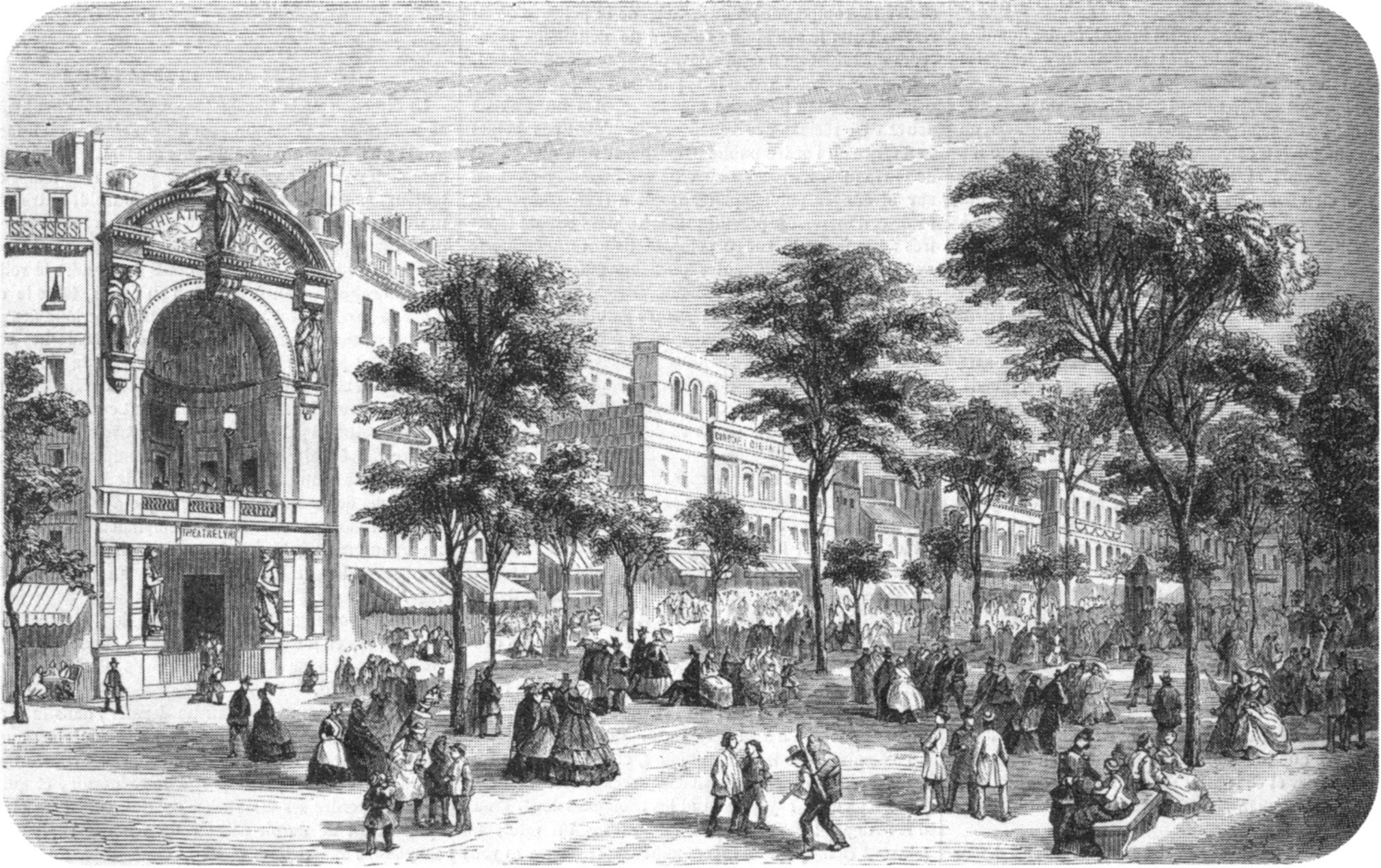
The Théâtre Historique in Paris, one of the homes of the Théâtre Lyrique company, pictured in 1862

Back in Paris with two years of his grant remaining, Bizet was temporarily secure financially and could ignore for the moment the difficulties that other young composers faced in the city. The two state-subsidised opera houses, the Opéra and the Opéra-Comique, (Note: The name "Opéra-Comique" does not imply literal "comic opera" or opera buffa. The most specific characteristic of Opéra-Comique productions was the replacement of sung recitative with spoken dialogue—the German singspiel model.) each presented traditional repertoires that tended to stifle and frustrate new homegrown talent; only eight of the 54 Prix de Rome laureates between 1830 and 1860 had had works staged at the Opéra. Although French composers were better represented at the Opéra-Comique, the style and character of productions had remained largely unchanged since the 1830s. A number of smaller theatres catered for operetta, a field in which Offenbach was then paramount, while the Théâtre Italien specialised in second-rate Italian opera. The best prospect for aspirant opera composers was the Théâtre Lyrique company which, despite repeated financial crises, operated intermittently in various premises under its resourceful manager Léon Carvalho. This company had staged the first performances of Gounod's Faust and his Roméo et Juliette, and of a shortened version of Berlioz's Les Troyens.

On 13 March 1861, Bizet attended the Paris premiere of Wagner's opera Tannhäuser, a performance greeted by audience riots that were stage-managed by the influential Jockey-Club de Paris. Despite this distraction, Bizet revised his opinions of Wagner's music, which he had previously dismissed as merely eccentric. He now declared Wagner "above and beyond all living composers". Thereafter, accusations of "Wagnerism" were often laid against Bizet, throughout his compositional career.

As a pianist, Bizet showed considerable skill from his earliest years. A contemporary asserted that he could have assured a future on the concert platform, but chose to conceal his talent "as though it were a vice". In May 1861 Bizet gave a rare demonstration of his virtuoso skills when, at a dinner party at which Liszt was present, he astonished everyone by playing on sight, flawlessly, one of the maestro's most difficult pieces. Liszt commented: "I thought there were only two men able to surmount the difficulties ... there are three, and ... the youngest is perhaps the boldest and most brilliant."

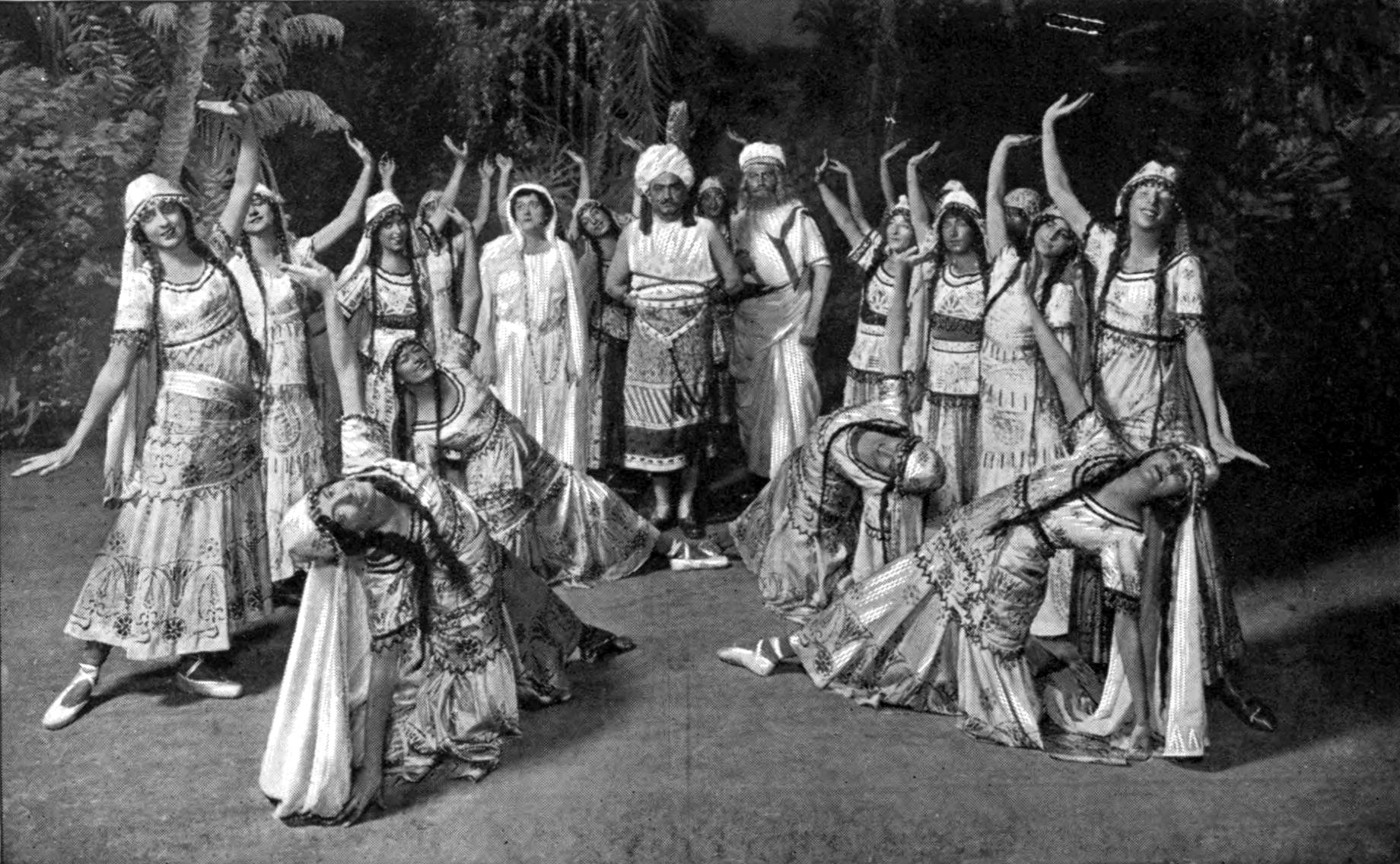
A scene from Act II of Les pêcheurs de perles

Bizet's third envoi was delayed for nearly a year by the prolonged illness and death, in September 1861, of his mother. He eventually submitted a trio of orchestral works: an overture entitled La Chasse d'Ossian, a scherzo and a funeral march. The overture has been lost; the scherzo was later absorbed into the Roma symphony, and the funeral march music was adapted and used in a later opera. Bizet's fourth and final envoi, which occupied him for much of 1862, was a one-act opera, La guzla de l'émir. As a state-subsidised theatre, the Opéra-Comique was obliged from time to time to stage the works of Prix de Rome laureates, and La guzla duly went into rehearsal in 1863. However, in April Bizet received an offer, which originated from Count Walewski, to compose the music for a three-act opera. This was Les pêcheurs de perles, based on a libretto by Michel Carré and Eugène Cormon. Because a condition of this offer was that the opera should be the composer's first publicly staged work, Bizet hurriedly withdrew La guzla from production and incorporated parts of its music into the new opera. The first performance of Les pêcheurs de perles, by the Théâtre Lyrique company, was on 30 September 1863. Critical opinion was generally hostile, though Berlioz praised the work, writing that it "does M. Bizet the greatest honour". Public reaction was lukewarm, and the opera's run ended after 18 performances. It was not performed again until 1886.

In 1862, Bizet had fathered a child with the family's housekeeper, Marie Reiter. The boy was brought up to believe that he was Adolphe Bizet's child; only on her deathbed in 1913 did Reiter reveal her son's true paternity.

==== Years of struggle ====
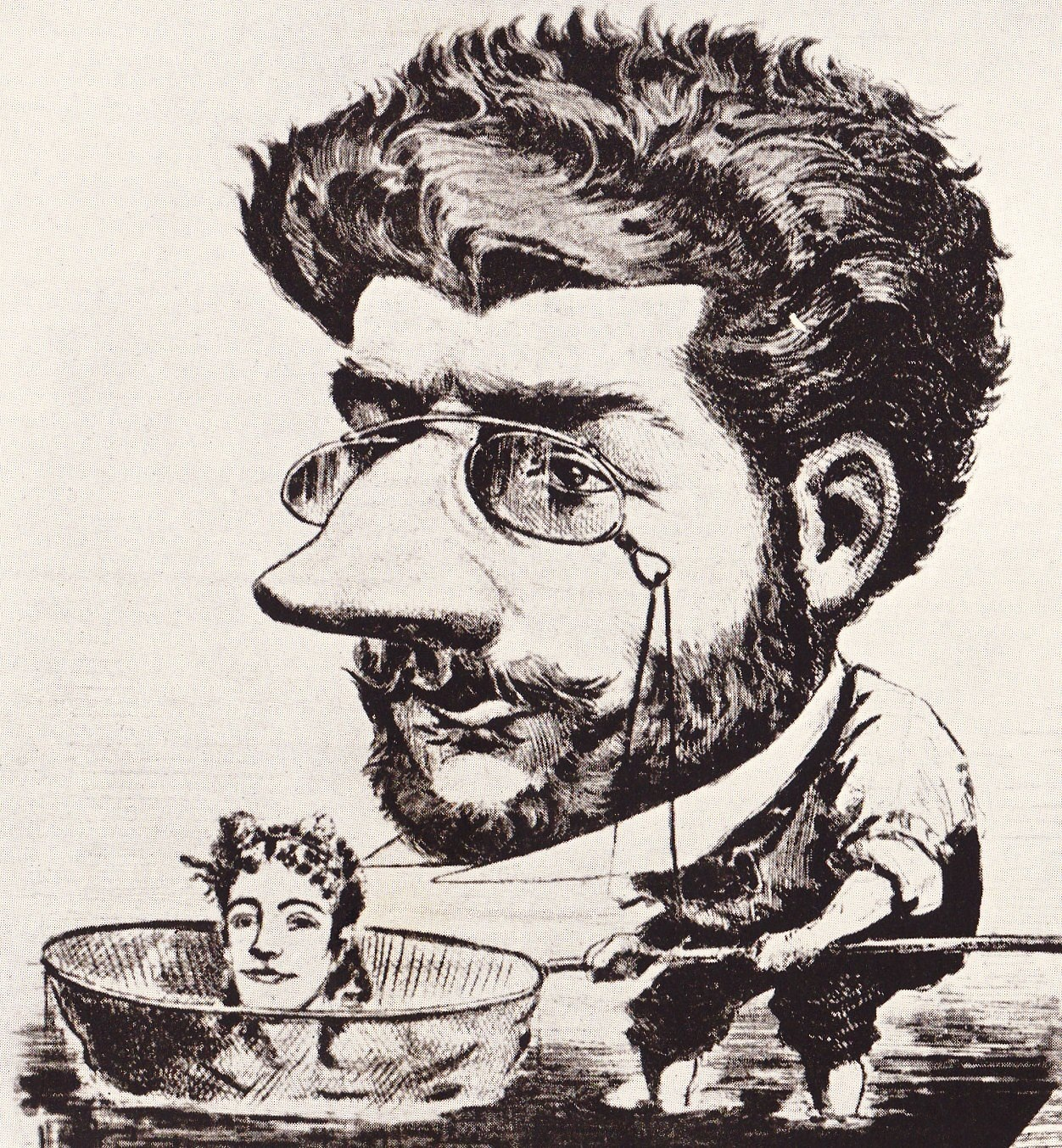
Caricature of Bizet, 1863, from the French magazine Diogène

When his Prix de Rome grant expired, Bizet found he could not make a living from writing music. He accepted piano pupils and some composition students, two of whom, Edmond Galabert and Paul Lacombe, became his close friends. He also worked as an accompanist at rehearsals and auditions for various staged works, including Berlioz's oratorio L'enfance du Christ and Gounod's opera Mireille. However, his main work in this period was as an arranger of others' works. He made piano transcriptions for hundreds of operas and other pieces and prepared vocal scores and orchestral arrangements for all kinds of music. He was also, briefly, a music critic for La Revue Nationale et Étrangère, under the assumed name of "Gaston de Betzi". Bizet's single contribution in this capacity appeared on 3 August 1867, after which he quarrelled with the magazine's new editor and resigned.

Since 1862, Bizet had been working intermittently on Ivan IV, an opera based on the life of Ivan the Terrible. Carvalho failed to deliver on his promise to produce it, so in December 1865, Bizet offered it to the Opéra, which rejected it; the work remained unperformed until 1946. In July 1866, Bizet signed another contract with Carvalho, for La jolie fille de Perth, the libretto for which, by Jules-Henri Vernoy de Saint-Georges after Sir Walter Scott, is described by Bizet's biographer Winton Dean as "the worst Bizet was ever called upon to set". Problems over the casting and other issues delayed its premiere for a year before it was finally performed by the Théâtre Lyrique on 26 December 1867. Its press reception was more favourable than that for any of Bizet's other operas; Le Ménestral's critic hailed the second act as "a masterpiece from beginning to end". Despite the opera's success, Carvalho's financial difficulties meant a run of only 18 performances.

While La jolie fille was in rehearsal, Bizet worked with three other composers, each of whom contributed a single act to a four-act operetta Marlbrough s'en va-t-en guerre. When the work was performed at the Théâtre de l'Athénée on 13 December 1867, it was a great success, and the Revue et Gazette Musicale's critic lavished particular praise on Bizet's act: "Nothing could be more stylish, smarter and, at the same time, more distinguished". Bizet also found time to finish his long-gestating Roma symphony and wrote numerous keyboard works and songs. Nevertheless, this period of Bizet's life was marked by significant disappointments. At least two projected operas were abandoned with little or no work done. (Note: Dean identifies one of these as Les Templiers, libretto by Saint-Georges and Léon Halévy. Another, title unknown, was for a libretto by Arthur Leroy and Thomas Sauvage.) Several competition entries, including a cantata and a hymn composed for the Paris Exhibition of 1867, were unsuccessful. La Coupe du Roi de Thulé, his entry for an opera competition, was not placed in the first five; from the fragments of this score that survive, analysts have discerned pre-echoes of Carmen. On 28 February 1869, the Roma symphony was performed at the Cirque Napoléon, under Jules Pasdeloup. Afterwards, Bizet informed Galabert that on the basis of proportionate applause, hisses, and catcalls, the work was a success. (Note: This performance, against Bizet's wishes, omitted the scherzo that had formed part of his third envoi. The scherzo was not included in the symphony until 1880, five years after Bizet's death.)

=== Marriage ===
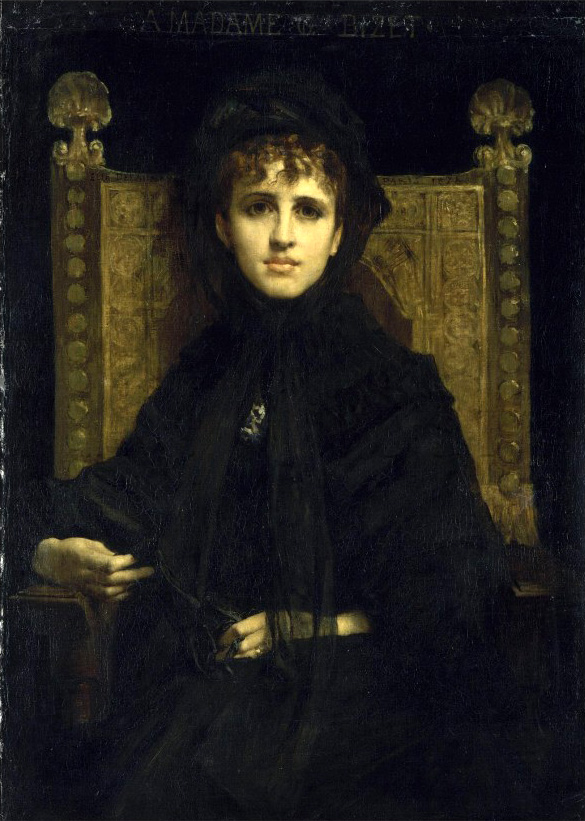
Geneviève Bizet, painted in 1878 by Jules-Élie Delaunay

Not long after Fromental Halévy's death in 1862, Bizet had been approached on behalf of Mme. Halévy about completing his old tutor's unfinished opera Noé. Although no action was taken at that time, Bizet remained on friendly terms with the Halévy family. Fromental had left two daughters; the elder, Esther, died in 1864, an event which so traumatised Mme. Halévy that she could not tolerate the company of her younger daughter Geneviève, who from the age of 15 lived with other family members. It is unclear when Geneviève and Bizet became emotionally attached, but in October 1867, he informed Galabert: "I have met an adorable girl whom I love! In two years she will be my wife!" The pair became engaged, although the Halévy family initially disallowed the match. According to Bizet they considered him an unsuitable catch: "penniless, left-wing, anti-religious and Bohemian", which Dean observes are odd grounds of objection from "a family bristling with artists and eccentrics". By summer 1869, their objections had been overcome, and the wedding took place on 3 June 1869. Ludovic Halévy wrote in his journal: "Bizet has spirit and talent. He should succeed".

As a belated homage to his late father-in-law, Bizet took up the Noé manuscript and completed it. Parts of his moribund Vasco da Gama and Ivan IV were incorporated into the score, but a projected production at the Théâtre Lyrique failed to materialise when Carvalho's company finally went bankrupt, and Noé remained unperformed until 1885. Bizet's marriage was initially happy, but was affected by Geneviève's nervous instability (inherited from both her parents), her difficult relations with her mother and by Mme. Halévy's interference in the couple's affairs. Despite this, Bizet kept on good terms with his mother-in-law and maintained an extensive correspondence with her. In the year following the marriage, he considered plans for at least half a dozen new operas and began to sketch the music for two of them: Clarissa Harlowe based on Samuel Richardson's novel Clarissa, and Grisélidis with a libretto from Victorien Sardou. However, his progress on these projects was brought to a halt in July 1870, with the outbreak of the Franco-Prussian War.

=== War and upheaval ===
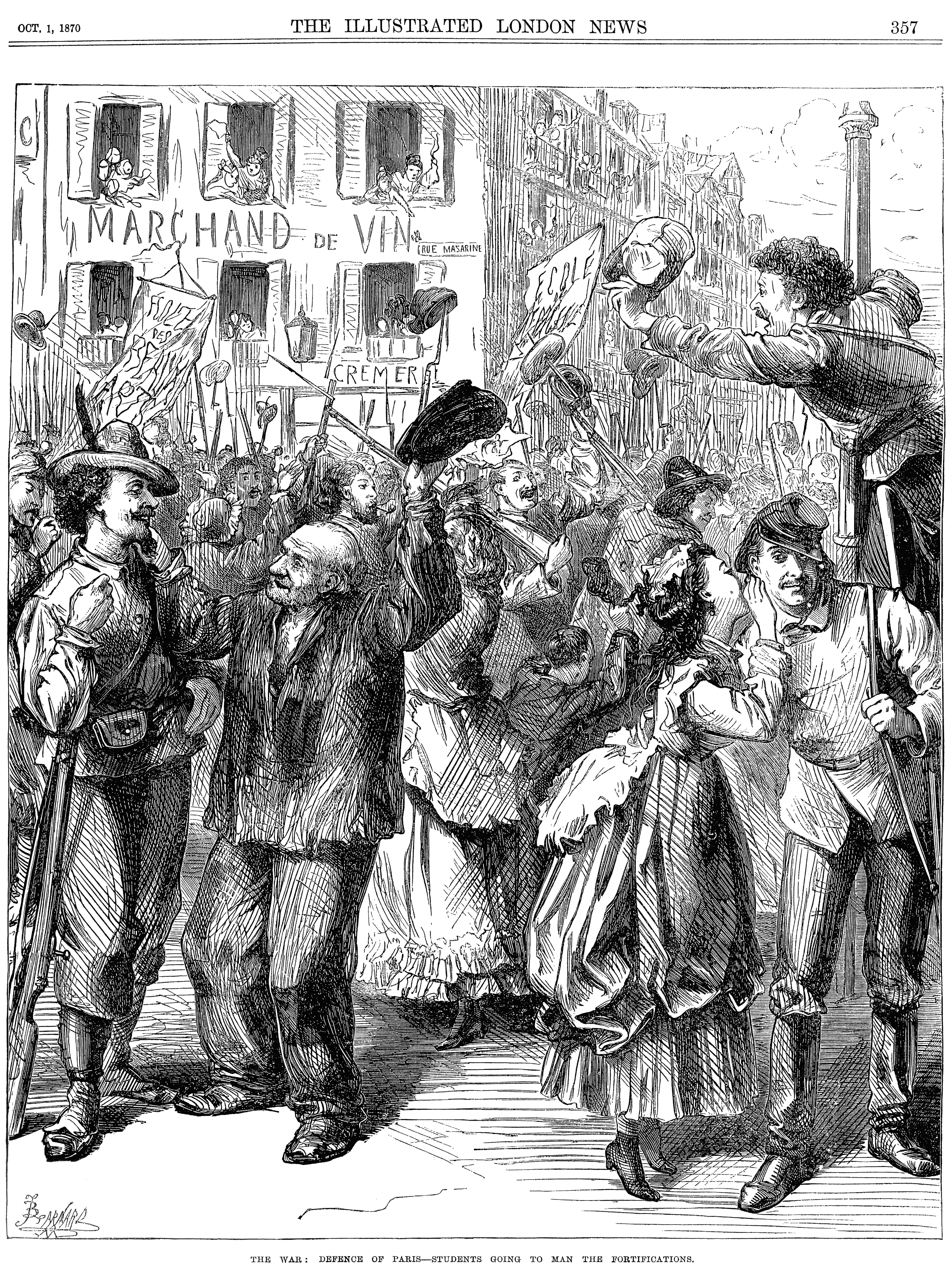
Paris during the siege, 1870–71. A contemporary English cartoon

After a series of perceived provocations from Prussia, culminating in the offer of the Spanish crown to the Prussian Prince Leopold of Hohenzollern, the French Emperor Napoleon III declared war on 15 July 1870. Initially, this step was supported by an outbreak of patriotic fervour and confident expectations of victory. Bizet, along with other composers and artists, joined the National Guard and began training. He was critical of the antiquated equipment with which he was supposed to fight; his unit's guns, he said, were more dangerous to themselves than to the enemy. The national mood was soon depressed by news of successive reverses; at Sedan on 2 September, the French armies suffered an overwhelming defeat; Napoleon was captured and deposed, and the Second Empire came to a sudden end.

Bizet greeted with enthusiasm the proclamation in Paris of the Third Republic. The new government did not sue for peace, and by 17 September, the Prussian armies had surrounded Paris. Unlike Gounod, who fled to England, Bizet rejected opportunities to leave the besieged city: "I can't leave Paris! It's impossible! It would be quite simply an act of cowardice", he wrote to Mme Halévy. Life in the city became frugal and harsh, (Note: Although there were few instances of actual starvation during the Siege, infant mortality rose considerably because of a shortage of milk. The main sources of meat were horses and domestic pets: "It has been calculated that during the entire Siege 65,000 horses, 5,000 cats and 1,200 dogs were eaten".) although, by October, there were efforts to re-establish normality. Pasdeloup resumed his regular Sunday concerts, and on 5 November, the Opéra reopened with excerpts from works by Gluck, Rossini, and Meyerbeer.

An armistice was signed on 26 January 1871, but the departure of the Prussian troops from Paris in March presaged a period of confusion and civil disturbance. Following an uprising, the city's municipal authority was taken over by dissidents who established the Paris Commune. Bizet decided that he was no longer safe in the city, and he and Geneviève escaped to Compiègne. Later, they moved to Le Vésinet where they sat out the two months of the Commune, within hearing distance of the gunfire that resounded as government troops gradually crushed the uprising: "The cannons are rumbling with unbelievable violence", Bizet wrote to his mother-in-law on 12 May.

=== Late career ===
==== Djamileh, L'Arlésienne and Don Rodrigue ====
As life in Paris returned to normal, in June 1871, Bizet's appointment as chorus-master at the Opéra was seemingly confirmed by its director, Émile Perrin. Bizet was due to begin his duties in October, but on 1 November, the post was assumed by Hector Salomon. In her biography of Bizet, Mina Curtiss surmises that he either resigned or refused to take up the position as a protest against what he thought was the director's unjustified closing of Ernest Reyer's opera Erostrate after only two performances. Bizet resumed work on Clarissa Harlowe and Grisélidis, but plans for the latter to be staged at the Opéra-Comique fell through, and neither work was finished; only fragments of their music survive. Bizet's other completed works in 1871 were the piano duet entitled Jeux d'enfants, and a one-act opera, Djamileh, which opened at the Opéra-Comique in May 1872. It was poorly staged and incompetently sung; at one point the leading singer missed 32 bars of music. It closed after 11 performances, not to be heard again until 1938. On 10 July Geneviève gave birth to the couple's only child, a son, Jacques.

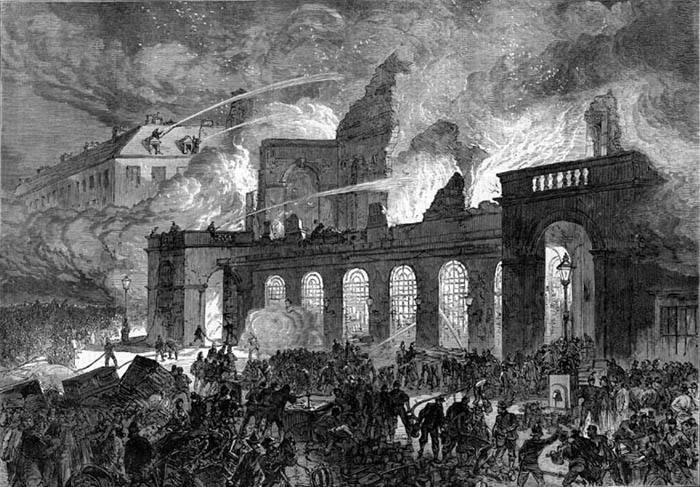
The Opéra, destroyed by fire, 29 October 1873

L'Arlesienne Suite no. 1, first movement (excerpt)

Bizet's next major assignment came from Carvalho, who was now managing Paris' Vaudeville theatre and wanted incidental music for Alphonse Daudet's play L'Arlésienne. When the play opened on 1 October, the music was dismissed by critics as too complex for popular taste. However, encouraged by Reyer and Massenet, Bizet fashioned a four-movement suite from the music, which was performed under Pasdeloup on 10 November to an enthusiastic reception. (Note: A second L'Arlésienne suite was prepared by Guiraud and performed in 1879, four years after Bizet's death. This is generally known as L'Arlésienne suite No. 2.) In the winter of 1872–73, Bizet supervised preparations for a revival of the still-absent Gounod's Roméo et Juliette at the Opéra-Comique. Relations between the two had been cool for some years, but Bizet responded positively to his former mentor's request for help, writing: "You were the beginning of my life as an artist. I spring from you".

In June 1872, Bizet informed Galabert: "I have just been ordered to compose three acts for the Opéra-Comique. [Henri] Meilhac and [Ludovic] Halévy are doing my piece". The subject chosen for this project was Prosper Mérimée's short novel, Carmen. Bizet began the music in the summer of 1873, but the Opéra-Comique's management was concerned about the suitability of this risqué story for a theatre that generally provided wholesome entertainment, and work was suspended. Bizet then began composing Don Rodrigue, an adaptation of the El Cid story by Louis Gallet and Édouard Blau. He played a piano version to a select audience that included the Opéra's principal baritone Jean-Baptiste Faure, hoping that the singer's approval might influence the directors of the Opéra to stage the work. However, on the night of 28–29 October, the Opéra burned to the ground; the directors, amid other pressing concerns, set Don Rodrigue aside. It was never completed; Bizet later adapted a theme from its final act as the basis of his 1875 overture, Patrie.

==== Carmen ====
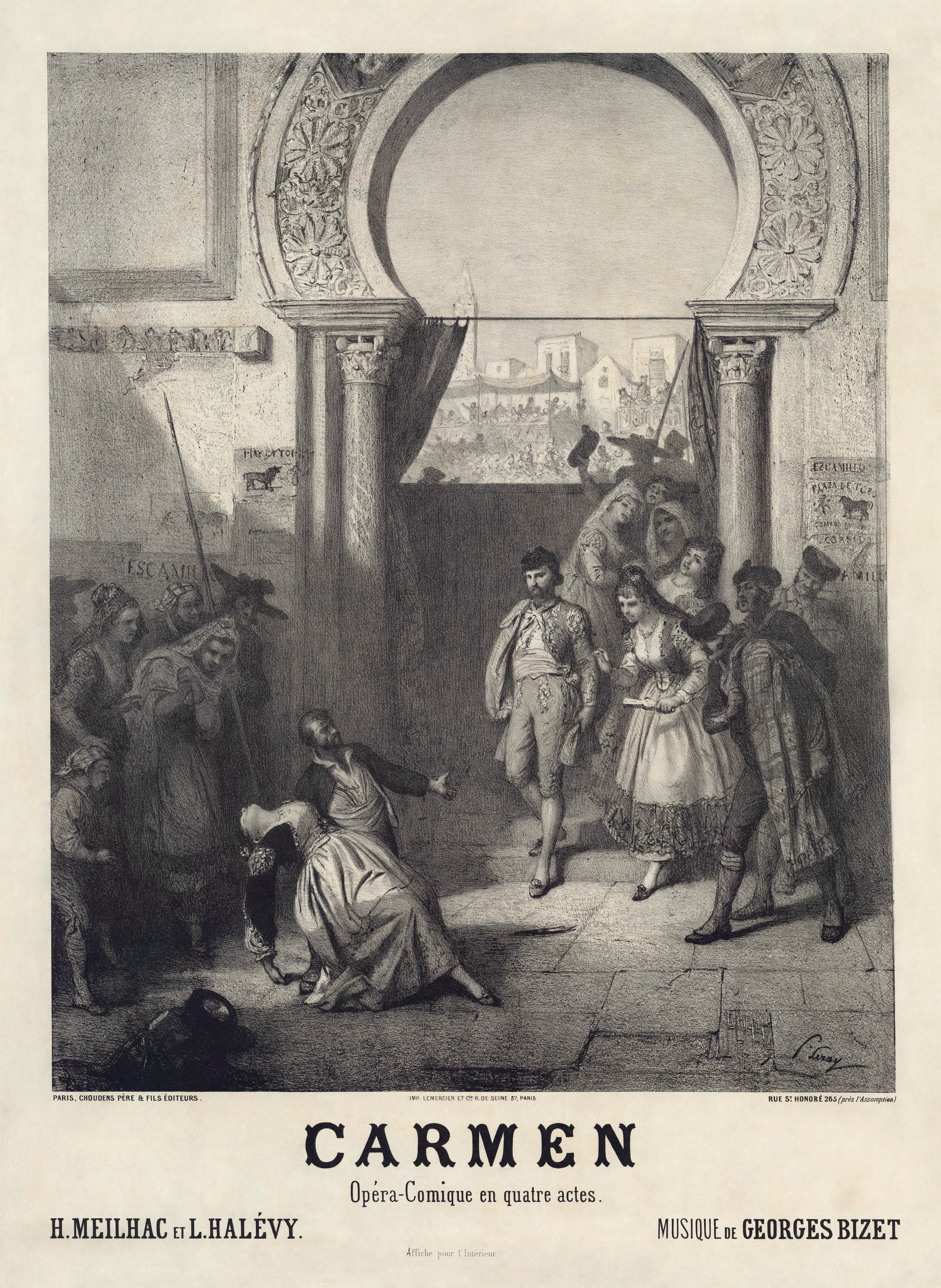
Poster from Carmen's première

Adolphe de Leuven, the co-director of the Opéra-Comique most bitterly opposed to the Carmen project, resigned early in 1874, removing the main barrier to the work's production. Bizet finished the score during the summer and was pleased with the outcome: "I have written a work that is all clarity and vivacity, full of colour and melody". The renowned mezzo-soprano Célestine Galli-Marié (known professionally as "Galli-Marié") was engaged to sing the title role. According to Dean, she was as delighted by the part as Bizet was by her suitability for it. There were rumours that he and the singer pursued a brief affair; his relations with Geneviève were strained at this time, and they lived apart for several months.

When rehearsals began in October 1874, the orchestra had difficulties with the score, finding some parts unplayable. The chorus likewise declared some of their music impossible to sing and were dismayed that they had to act as individuals, smoking and fighting onstage rather than merely standing in line. Bizet also had to counter further attempts at the Opéra-Comique to modify parts of the action which they deemed improper. Only when the leading singers threatened to withdraw from the production did the management give way. Resolving these issues delayed the first night until 3 March 1875 on which morning, by chance, Bizet's appointment as a Chevalier of the Legion of Honour was announced.

Among leading musical figures at the premiere were Jules Massenet, Camille Saint-Saëns, and Charles Gounod. Geneviève, suffering from an abscess in her right eye, was unable to be present. The opera's first performance extended to four-and-a-half hours; the final act did not begin until after midnight. Afterwards, Massenet and Saint-Saëns were congratulatory, Gounod less so. According to one account, he accused Bizet of plagiarism: "Georges has robbed me! Take the Spanish airs and mine out of the score and there remains nothing to Bizet's credit but the sauce that masks the fish". (Note: The acknowledged Spanish melodies are the Habanera, which uses a popular tune by Sebastián Iradier, and the entr'acte to Act 4 which is based on an aria from Manuel Garcia's opera El criado fingido.) Much of the press comment was negative, expressing consternation that the heroine was an amoral seductress rather than a woman of virtue. Galli-Marié's performance was described by one critic as "the very incarnation of vice". Others complained of a lack of melody and made unfavourable comparisons with the traditional Opéra-Comique fare of Auber and Boieldieu. Léon Escudier in L'Art musical called the music "dull and obscure ... the ear grows weary of waiting for the cadence that never comes". There was, however, praise from the poet Théodore de Banville, who applauded Bizet for presenting a drama with real men and women instead of the usual Opéra-Comique "puppets". The public's reaction was lukewarm, and Bizet soon became convinced of its failure: "I foresee a definite and hopeless flop".

=== Illness and death ===
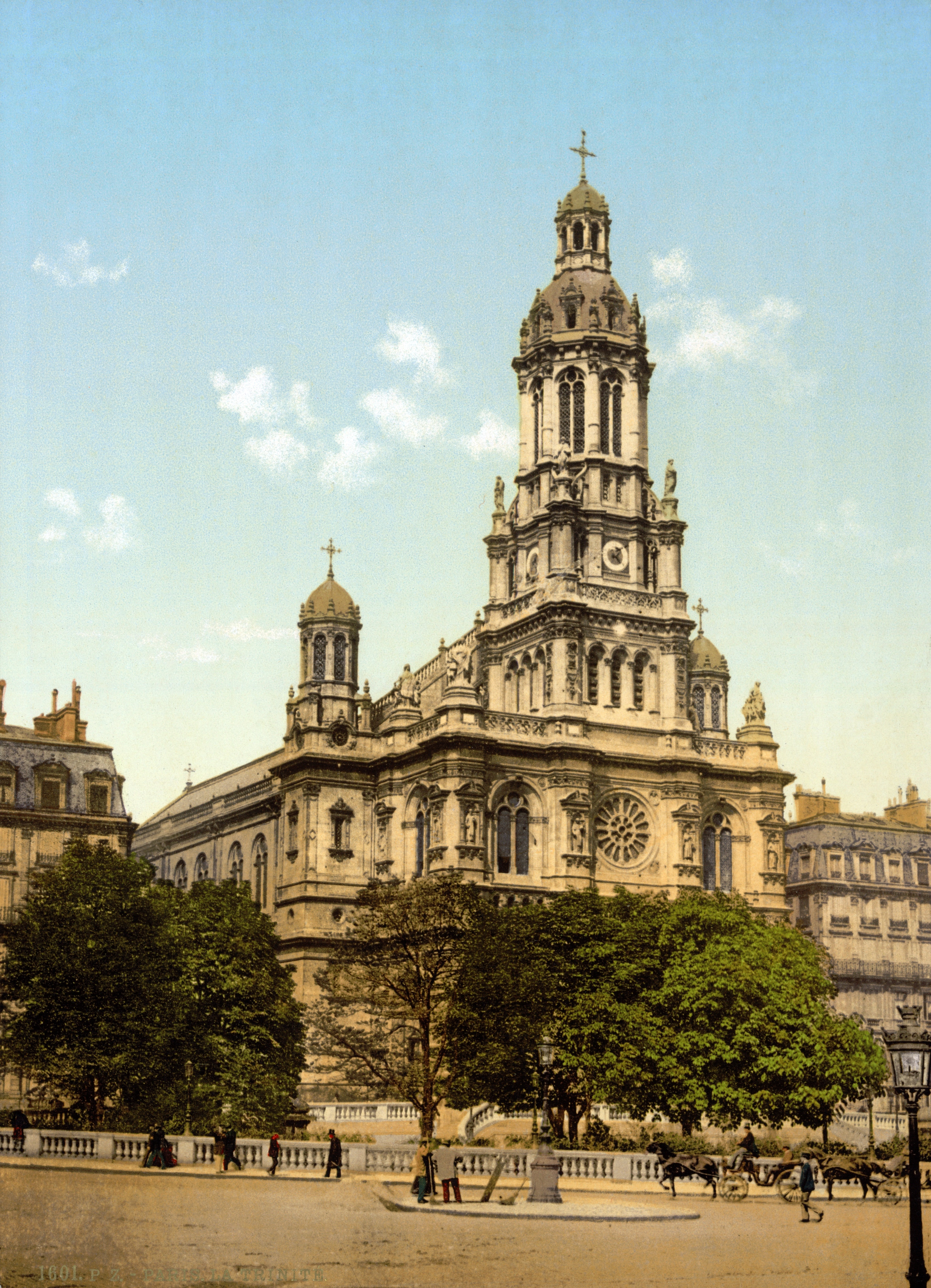
Église de la Sainte-Trinité, Paris, where Bizet's funeral service was held on 5 June 1875

For most of his life, Bizet had suffered from a recurrent throat complaint. A heavy smoker, he may have further undermined his health by overwork during the mid-1860s, when he toiled over publishers' transcriptions for up to 16 hours a day. In 1868, he informed Galabert that he had been very ill with abscesses in the windpipe: "I suffered like a dog". In 1871, and again in 1874, while completing Carmen, he had been disabled by severe bouts of what he described as "throat angina", and suffered a further attack in late March 1875. At that time, depressed by the evident failure of Carmen, Bizet was slow to recover and fell ill again in May. At the end of the month, he went to his holiday home at Bougival and, feeling a little better, went for a swim in the Seine. On the next day, 1 June, he was afflicted by high fever and pain, which was followed by an apparent heart attack. He seemed temporarily to recover, but in the early hours of 3 June, his wedding anniversary, he suffered a fatal second attack. He was 36 years old.

The suddenness of Bizet's death, and awareness of his depressed mental state, fuelled rumours of suicide. Although the exact cause of death was never settled with certainty, physicians eventually determined the cause as "a cardiac complication of acute articular rheumatism". (Note: This opinion was recorded by a physician, Eugène Gelma of the University of Strasbourg, many years after Bizet's death.) News of the death stunned the Paris musical world, and because Galli-Marié was too upset to appear, that evening's performance of Carmen was cancelled and replaced with Boieldieu's La dame blanche.

More than 4,000 people were present at the funeral on 5 June, at the Église de la Sainte-Trinité, just to the north of the Opéra. Adolphe Bizet led the mourners, who included Gounod, Thomas, Ludovic Halévy, Léon Halévy and Massenet. An orchestra, under Jules Pasdeloup, played Patrie, and the organist improvised a fantasy on themes from Carmen. At the burial which followed at the Père Lachaise Cemetery, Gounod gave the eulogy. He said that Bizet had been struck down just as he was becoming recognised as a true artist. Towards the end of his address, Gounod broke down and was unable to deliver his peroration. After a special performance of Carmen at the Opéra-Comique that night, the press, which had almost universally condemned the piece three months earlier, now declared Bizet a master.

== Music ==
=== Early works ===
Bizet's earliest compositions, chiefly songs and keyboard pieces written as exercises, give early indications of his emergent power and his gifts as a melodist. Dean sees evidence in the piano work Romance sans parole, written before 1854, of "the conjunction of melody, rhythm and accompaniment" that is characteristic of Bizet's mature works. Bizet's first orchestral piece was an overture written in 1855 in the manner of Rossini's Guillaume Tell. Critics have found it unremarkable, but the Symphony in C of the same year has been warmly praised by later commentators who have made favourable comparisons with Mozart and Schubert. In Dean's view, the symphony has "few rivals and perhaps no superior in the work of any composer of such youth". The critic Ernest Newman suggests that Bizet may at this time have thought that his future lay in the field of instrumental music, before an "inner voice" (and the realities of the French musical world) turned him towards the stage.

=== Orchestral, piano and vocal works ===
After his early Symphony in C, Bizet's purely orchestral output is sparse. The Roma symphony over which he laboured for more than eight years compares poorly, in Dean's view, with its juvenile predecessor. The work, says Dean, owes something to Gounod and contains passages that recall Weber and Mendelssohn. However, Dean contends that the work suffers from poor organisation and an excess of pretentious music; he calls it a "misfire". Bizet's other mature orchestral work, the overture Patrie, is similarly dismissed: "an awful warning of the danger of confusing art with patriotism".

The musicologist Hugh Macdonald argues that Bizet's best orchestral music is found in the suites that he derived from the 12-movement Jeux d'enfants for piano four-hands (1871) and the musique de scène for Daudet's play L'Arlésienne (1872): Jeux resulted in the Petite suite of 1873, which has five movements (Marche—Berceuse—Impromptu—Duo—Galop), while the musique de scène resulted in two suites, one from the year of the premiere compiled by Bizet (Prélude—Menuet—Adagietto—Carillon) and the other from 1879 compiled posthumously by Guiraud (Pastorale—Intermezzo—Menuet—Farandole). According to Macdonald, in all three Bizet demonstrates a maturity of style that, had he lived longer, might have been the basis for future great orchestral works.

Bizet's piano works have not entered the concert pianist's repertoire and are generally too difficult for amateurs to attempt. The exception is the above-described Jeux d'enfants duet suite; here Bizet avoids the virtuoso passages that so dominate his solo music. The early solo pieces bear the influence of Chopin; later works, such as the Variations chromatiques or the Chasse fantastique, owe more to Liszt.

Most of Bizet's songs were written in the period 1866–68. Dean defines the main weaknesses in these songs as an unimaginative repetition of the same music for each verse, and a tendency to write for the orchestra rather than the voice. Much of Bizet's larger-scale vocal music is lost; the early Te Deum, which survives in full, is rejected by Dean as "a wretched work [that] merely illustrates Bizet's unfitness to write religious music."

=== Dramatic works ===
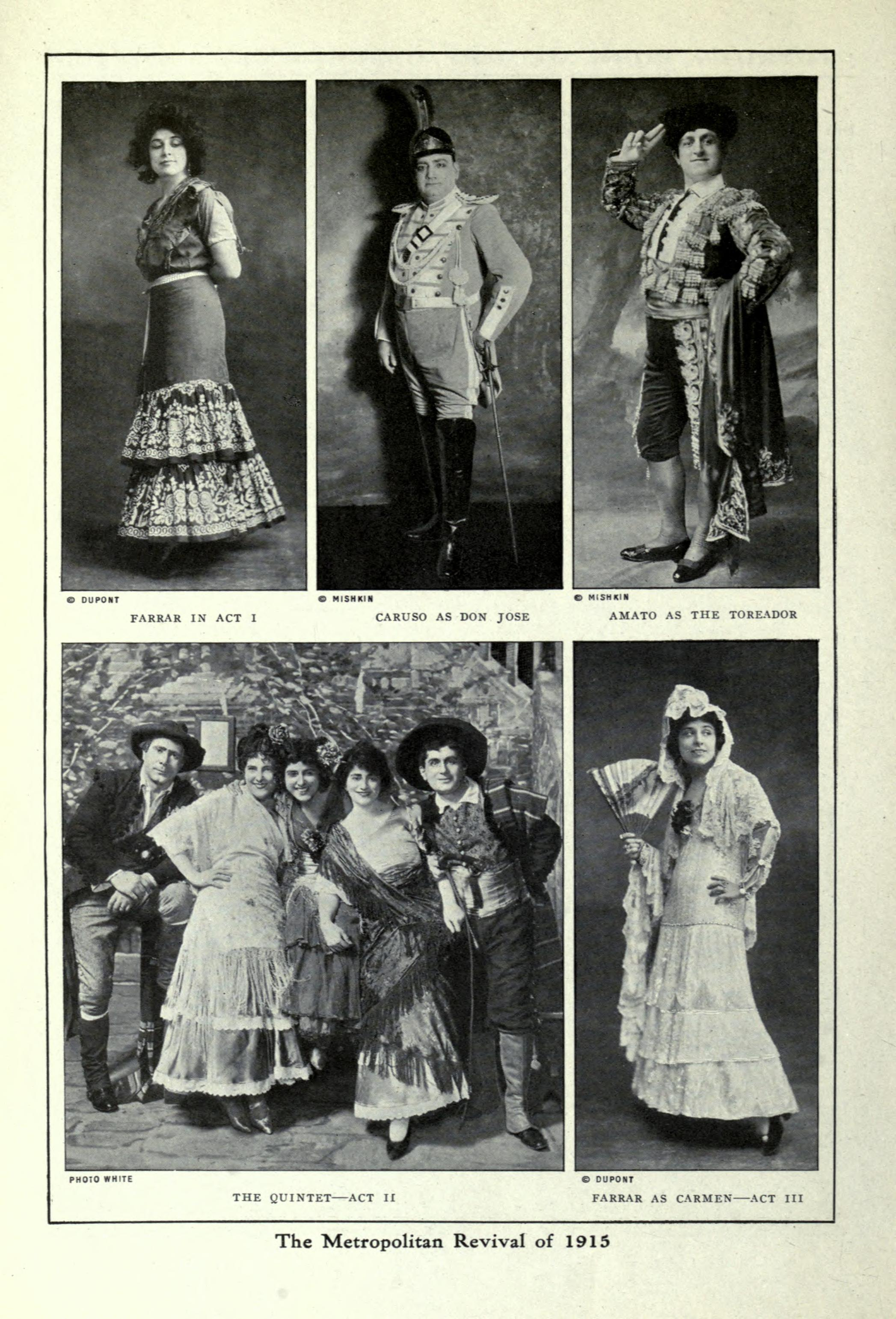
Publicity shots for the Carmen revival at the Metropolitan Opera, New York, in January 1915, with Enrico Caruso and Geraldine Farrar. Caruso is centre in the upper row, Farrar top left and bottom right.

Bizet's early one-act opera Le docteur Miracle provides the first clear signs of his promise in this genre, its sparkling music including, according to Dean, "many happy touches of parody, scoring and comic characterisation". Newman perceives evidence of Bizet's later achievements in many of his earliest works: "[A]gain and again we light upon some touch or other in them that only a musician with a dramatic root of the matter in him could have achieved." Until Carmen, however, Bizet was not essentially an innovator in the musical theatre. He wrote most of his operas in the traditions of Italian and French opera established by such as Donizetti, Rossini, Berlioz, Gounod, and Thomas. Macdonald suggests that, technically, he surpassed all of these, with a feeling for the human voice that compares with that of Mozart.

In Don Procopio, Bizet followed the stock devices of Italian opera as typified by Donizetti in Don Pasquale, a work which it closely resembles. However, the familiar idiom is interspersed with original touches in which Bizet's fingerprints emerge unmistakably. In his first significant opera, Les pêcheurs de perles, Bizet was hampered by a dull libretto and a laborious plot; nevertheless, the music in Dean's view rises at times "far above the level of contemporary French opera". Its many original flourishes include the introduction to the cavatina Comme autrefois dans la nuit sombre played by two French horns over a cello background, an effect which in the words of analyst Hervé Lacombe, "resonates in the memory like a fanfare lost in a distant forest". While the music of Les pêcheurs is atmospheric and deeply evocative of the opera's Eastern setting, in La jolie fille de Perth, Bizet made no attempt to introduce Scottish colour or mood, though the scoring includes highly imaginative touches such as a separate band of woodwind and strings during the opera's Act III seduction scene.

From Bizet's unfinished works, Macdonald highlights La coupe du roi de Thulé as giving clear signs of the power that would reach a pinnacle in Carmen and suggests that had Clarissa Harlowe and Grisélidis been completed, Bizet's legacy would have been "infinitely richer". As Bizet moved away from the accepted musical conventions of French opera, he encountered critical hostility. In the case of Djamileh, the accusation of "Wagnerism" was raised again, as audiences struggled to understand the score's originality; many found the music pretentious and monotonous, lacking in both rhythm and melody. By contrast, modern critical opinion as expressed by Macdonald is that Djamileh is "a truly enchanting piece, full of inventive touches, especially of chromatic colour."

Ralph P. Locke, in his study of Carmen's origins, draws attention to Bizet's successful evocation of Andalusian Spain. Grout, in his History of Western Music, praises the music's extraordinary rhythmic and melodic vitality, and Bizet's ability to obtain the maximum dramatic effect in the most economical fashion. Among the opera's early champions were Tchaikovsky, Brahms, and particularly Wagner, who commented: "Here, thank God, at last for a change is somebody with ideas in his head." Another champion of the work was Friedrich Nietzsche, who claimed to know it by heart; "It is music that makes no pretensions to depth, but it is delightful in its simplicity, so unaffected and sincere". By broad consent, Carmen represents the fulfilment of Bizet's development as a master of music drama and the culmination of the genre of opéra comique.

== Legacy ==
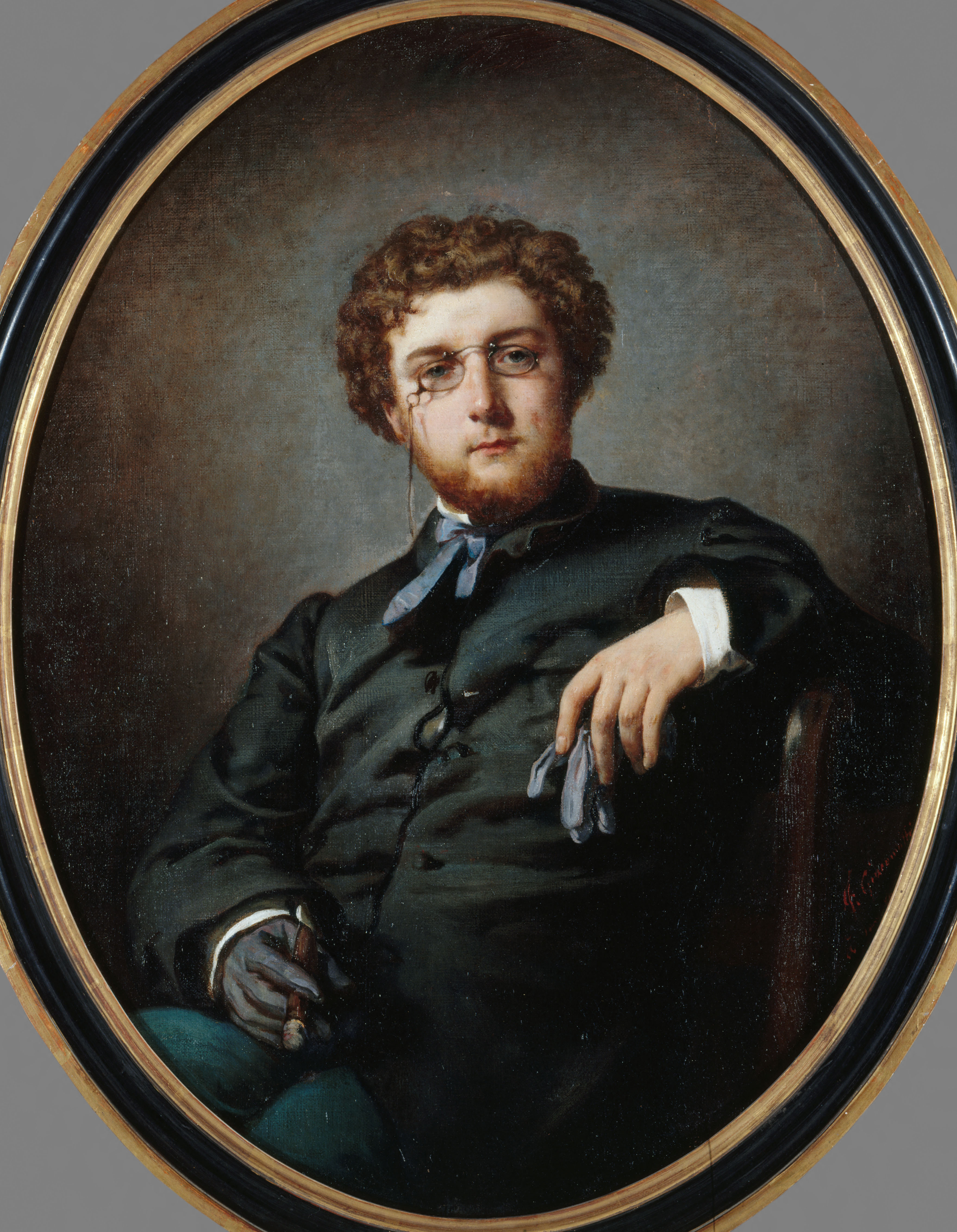
Georges Bizet by Félix-Henri Giacomotti (c. 1865)

After Bizet's death, many of his manuscripts were lost; works were revised by other hands and published in these unauthorised versions so that it is often difficult to establish what is authentic Bizet. Even Carmen was altered into grand opera format by the replacement of its dialogue with recitatives written by Guiraud, and by other amendments to the score. The music world did not immediately acknowledge Bizet as a master and, apart from Carmen and the L'Arlésienne suite, few of his works were performed in the years immediately following his death. However, the 20th century saw increased interest. Don Procopio was revived in Monte Carlo in 1906; an Italian version of Les pêcheurs de perles was performed at the Metropolitan Opera in New York on 13 November 1916, with Caruso in the leading tenor role, and it has since become a staple at many opera houses. After its first performance in Switzerland in 1935, the Symphony in C entered the concert repertory and has been recorded by, among many others, Sir Thomas Beecham. Excerpts from La coupe du roi de Thulé, edited by Winton Dean, were broadcast by the BBC on 12 July 1955, and Le docteur Miracle was revived in London on 8 December 1957 by the Park Lane Group. Vasco da Gama and Ivan IV have been recorded, as have numerous songs and the complete piano music. (Note: Numerous recordings of these works are available.) Carmen, after its lukewarm initial Paris run of 45 performances, became a worldwide popular success after performances in Vienna (1875) and London (1878). It has been hailed as the first opera of the verismo school, in which sordid and brutal subjects are emphasised, with art reflecting life—"not idealised life but life as actually lived".

The music critic Harold C. Schonberg surmises that, had Bizet lived, he might have revolutionised French opera; as it is, verismo was taken up mainly by Italians, notably Puccini who, according to Dean, developed the idea "till it became threadbare". (Note: In his 1958 biography of Puccini, Edward Greenfield calls the association of Puccini with verismo "misleading", stating that he chose his subjects on pragmatic principles of maximum audience appeal.) Bizet founded no specific school, though Dean names Chabrier and Ravel as composers influenced by him. Dean also suggests that a fascination with Bizet's tragic heroes—Frédéri in L'Arlésienne, José in Carmen—is reflected in Tchaikovsky's late symphonies, particularly the B minor "Pathetique". Macdonald writes that Bizet's legacy is limited by the shortness of his life and by the false starts and lack of focus that persisted until his final five years. "The spectacle of great works unwritten either because Bizet had other distractions, or because no one asked him to write them, or because of his premature death, is infinitely dispiriting, yet the brilliance and the individuality of his best music is unmistakable. It has greatly enriched a period of French music already rich in composers of talent and distinction."

In Bizet's family circle, his father Adolphe died in 1886. Bizet's son Jacques killed himself in 1922 after an unhappy love affair. Jean Reiter, Bizet's elder son, had a successful career as press director of Le Temps, became an Officer of the Legion of Honour, and died in 1939 at the age of 77. In 1886, Geneviève married Émile Straus, a rich lawyer; she became a famous Parisian society hostess and a close friend of, among others, Marcel Proust. She showed little interest in her first husband's musical legacy, made no effort to catalogue Bizet's manuscripts and gave many away as souvenirs. She died in 1926; in her will, she established a fund for a Georges Bizet prize, to be awarded annually to a composer under 40 who had "produced a remarkable work within the previous five years". Winners of the prize include Tony Aubin, Jean-Michel Damase, Henri Dutilleux, and Jean Martinon.

== Sources ==
- Curtiss, Mina (1959). Bizet and his World. London: Secker & Warburg. OCLC 505162968.
- Dean, Winton (1965). Georges Bizet: His Life and Work. London: J.M. Dent & Sons. OCLC 643867230.
- Dean, Winton (1980). "Bizet, Georges (Alexandre César Léopold)". In Sadie, Stanley (ed.). The New Grove Dictionary of Music and Musicians. Vol. 2. London: Macmillan. ISBN 0-333-23111-2.
- Dent, Edward J. (1934). "Opera". In Bacharach, A. L. (ed.). The Musical Companion. London: Victor Gollancz. OCLC 500218960.
- Greenfield, Edward (1958). Puccini: Keeper of the Seal. London: Arrow Books. OCLC 654174732.
- Grout, Donald Jay; Palisca, Claude V. (1981). A History of Western Music (Third ed.). London: J.M. Dent & Sons. ISBN 0-460-04546-6.
- Lacombe, Hervé (2001). The Keys to French Opera in the Nineteenth Century. Berkeley: University of California Press. p. 132. ISBN 0-520-21719-5.
- Locke, Ralph P. (2009). "Spanish Local Color in Bizet's Carmen". In Fauser, Annegret; Everist, Mark (eds.). Music, Theatre and Cultural Transfer: Paris 1830–1914. Chicago: The University of Chicago Press. ISBN 978-0-226-23926-2.
- McClary, Susan (1992). Georges Bizet: Carmen. Cambridge, UK: Cambridge University Press. ISBN 0-521-39897-5.
- Neef, Sigrid, ed. (2000). Opera: Composers, Works, Performers (English ed.). Cologne: Könemann. ISBN 3-8290-3571-3.
- Newman, Ernest (1954). More Opera Nights. London: Putnam. OCLC 462366584.
- Osborne, Charles (1992). The Complete Operas of Wagner. London: Victor Gollancz. ISBN 0-575-05380-1.
- Roberts, David, ed. (2005). The Classical Good CD & DVD Guide. London: Haymarket Consumer. ISBN 0-86024-972-7.
- Schonberg, Harold (1975). The Lives of the Great Composers, Volume I. London: Futura Publications. ISBN 0-86007-722-5.
- Schonberg, Harold (1975). The Lives of the Great Composers, Volume II. London: Futura Publications. ISBN 0-86007-723-3.
- Steen, Michael (2003). The Life and Times of the Great Composers. London: Icon Books. ISBN 978-1-84046-679-9.
- Warrack, John; West, Ewan (1992). The Oxford Dictionary of Opera. Oxford: Oxford University Press. ISBN 0-19-869164-5.
