= Robert Dreyfus =

French writer and journalist

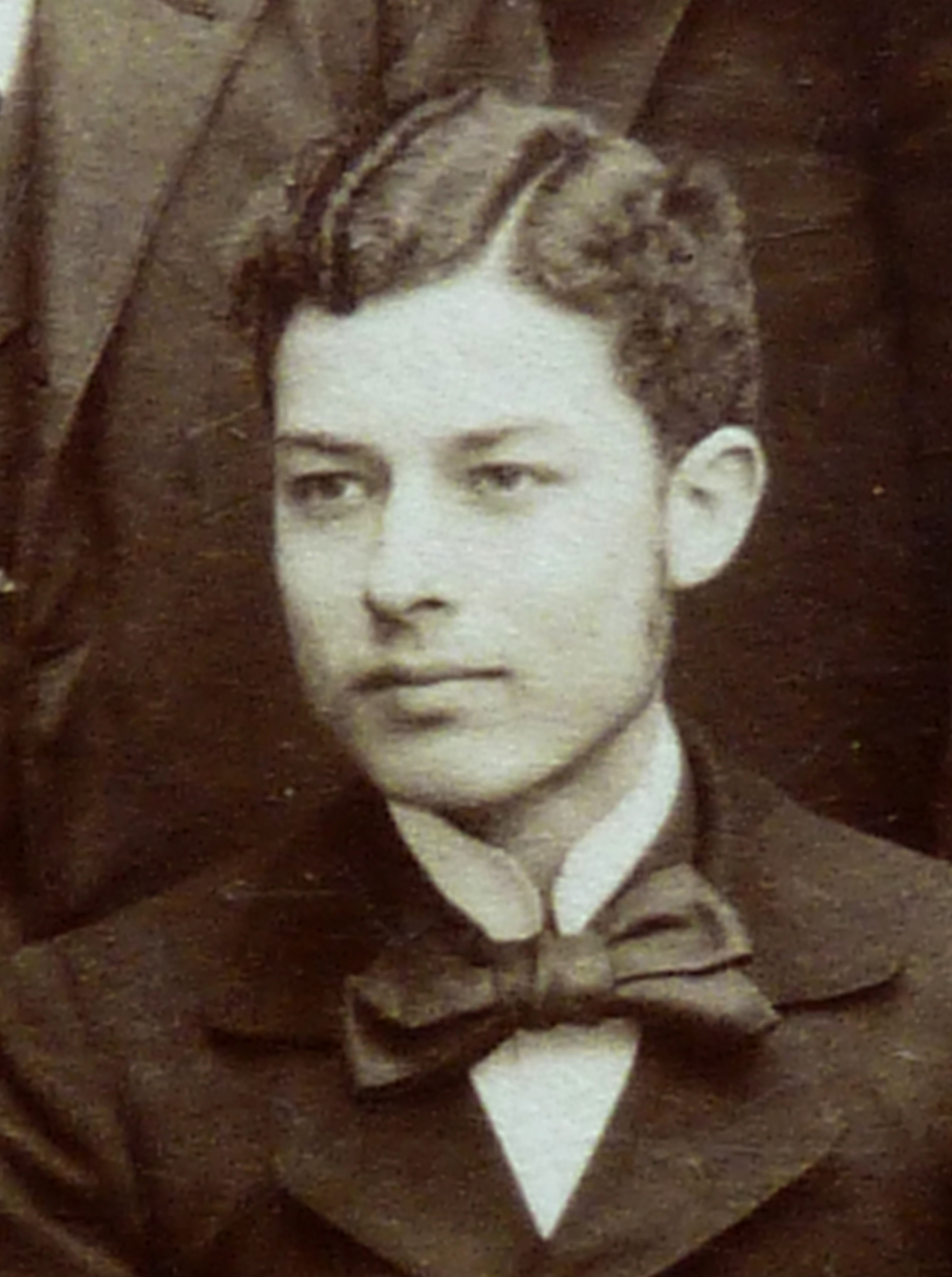
- ca. 1890
- Born: Robert Jean Dreyfus; 13 March 1873; Paris 9, France
- Died: 17 June 1939 (aged 66); Paris 9, France
- Occupations: Writer-intellectual; Journalist; Wartime government official with possible links to the intelligence services
- Known for: his friendship with and endless loyalty to Marcel Proust

Robert Dreyfus (13 March 1873 - 17 June 1939) was a French writer and journalist who wrote for Le Figaro. During World War I, between January 1916 and February 1919, he was employed in the Ministry of Foreign Affairs, working in the ministry's "diplomatic information service" where he compiled a valuable body of documentation concerning the workings of the Austro-Hungarian empire. His contributions earned him a knighthood in 1920.

A century later, however, it is not for his incisive journalism, nor for his achievements in one of the more self-effacing corners of the Foreign Ministry that he is remembered, but for his loyalty to his childhood playmate and school near-contemporary, Marcel Proust. They began their correspondence while still at school, since poor health kept Proust away from the classroom for much of the time. The correspondence continued at least till 1920 and the friendship was lifelong. Dreyfus, confident that his friend's burgeoning literary reputation would endure, carefully preserved the letters he received from the great man. After Proust died his reputation in literary circles and more general continued to grow, and Dreyfus produced a book of his own, "Souvenirs sur Marcel Proust, accompagné de lettres inédites", quoting extensively from hitherto unpublished letters in his possession. In France, and among francophone scholars round the world, these published "memories" still serve as a valuable and oft cited source of information.

== Biography ==
Robert Jean Dreyfus was born during the traumatic aftermath of the Franco-Prussian War in Paris 9, an Arrondissement in the heart of the city known for the number of theatres in it, including the city's new Opera House. In 1888 he enrolled at the prestigious Lycée Condorcet (secondary school), indicating that he was born into circumstances of at least moderate affluence. Marcel Proust would later recall the atmosphere at the school as resembling a "a Lilliputian Cénacle". Dreyfus was fifteen when he joined the school. Marcel Proust had been eleven when he had become a pupil back in 1883. Proust was older by slightly less than two years. Nevertheless, within the circle which included them both Proust later identified Dreyfus as one of his three most intelligent school friends. On Thursday afternoon children from the well-to-do families of the 8th and 9th arrondissements would meet up to play in the Jardins des Champs-Élysées (park) or the Parc Monceau. In his book Dreyfus identified some of the group members: Marcel Proust, Jacques Bizet, Daniel Halévy, Maurice Herbette, Paul Bénazet, Léon Brunschvicg, Louis de La Salle and Jean de Tinan. Sometimes they were joined for these Thursday afternoon social sessions in the park by some of the girls, such as Antoinette et Lucie Faure, Gabrielle Schartz or the sisters Nelly and Marie de Benardaky. (Note: L'auteur décrit les scènes de jeux et les deux fillettes d'origine russe sans les nommer: «Je me souviens pourtant de deux sœurs, élégantes, grandes et belles. dont l’aînée inspirait au tendre Marcel une prédilection passionnée, et, comme elles étaient d'origine étrangère et fort du grand monde... »)

Proust was a sickly child much of whose school career was spent ill at home. This is given as an explanation for the two schoolboys having embarked on their regular exchange of correspondence in 1888, while both were still enrolled as pupils at the same school. They would continue to exchange letters till 1920 and Dreyfus, confident in his friend's future fame, kept all the letters he received. Marcel Proust died in 1922, and four years later Richard Dreyfus published "Souvenirs sur Marcel Proust, accompagné de lettres inédites", a very personal book containing his memories of years and adolescence spent in the company of his friend, based on, and incorporating extensive extracts from, hitherto "unpublished letters".

During 1892/93 Dreyfus teamed up with Proust, their friend Daniel Halévy and other members of the group among the alumni of the Lycée Condorcet, to produce "Le Banquet", a (not quite) monthly literary magazine that survived for precisely one year. Most of the publication's leading contributors were older than Dreyfus. Something that they all seem to have shared was a passionate respect for Marcel Proust's overbearing literary abilities, though not all would be as constant as Dreyfus in terms of not falling out with their literary idol over the decades that followed. The publication's failure was probably down to "financial issues", according to Dreyfus. Proust himself was still suffering from poor health, and seems to have been less committed to the project than some of the others, since he was by this time enrolled at the "École libre des sciences politiques" (ELSP) where he was enrolled as what one source describes as "an intermittent law student", taught by Albert Sorel and Henri Jean Baptiste Anatole Leroy-Beaulieu. (Proust later switched to the Sorbonne where he studied Literature with Henri Bergson: it was in respect of his literature studies that in 1895 Proust would receive his "licencié ès lettres" degree.)

During the early years of the twentieth century Dreyfus contributed a number of essays to "Cahiers de la Quinzaine", a (not quite) bimonthly journal. One of these essays, published in 1905, won him a prize in 1906 from the Académie Française. The prize-winning piece, running to more than 500 pages, concerned the "life and prophecies of the Count of Gobineau (1816-1882)". During the middle and later years of the twentieth century it became customary among scholars to view Gobineau as a precursor of toxic race theories used to justify the holocaust, but Dreyfus produced his own study a generation before Hitler took power in Germany, and in the context of the times, at least in the judgment of Hannah Arendt, "there is nothing to prevent perfectly respectable intellectuals, such as Robert Dreyfus or Thomas Mann, from taking this [self-proclaimed] 'descendant of Odin' seriously .... Long before that humanly incomprehensible blend of the horrible and the ridiculous that our [twentieth] century carries as its hallmark, the ridiculous had [seemingly] lost the power to kill".

War broke out officially (where the French government was concerned) at the start of August 1914. Dreyfus, now aged 41, was mobilised in Albi, joining with of Reynaldo Hahn, who was another member of the circle of Proust admirers, and was just one year younger than Dreyfus. Albi was considered a relatively safe posting, far from the German armies invading from the north. Their commanding officer there was a man known to Proust. The man's sister was a singer at the Opéra-Comique in Paris. A few months later, in defiance of Proust's urgent entreaties, in November 1914 Hahn, having become very bored and frustrated with the lack of action in Albi, insisted on being redeployed to another regiment, closer to the frontline: Dreyfus did not. Soon afterwards Dreyfus took work as a newspaper reporter with the Paris-based mass-circulation newspaper, Le Figaro.

Sources indicate that Dreyfus remained with Figaro as a "staff reporter" for a number of years. It seems not to have been a very full-time job, however. In January 1916 he entered government service, joining the "diplomatic information section" at the Ministry of Foreign Affairs. Paperwork in support of an honour which he subsequently received is somewhat elliptical in describing what he did to earn it, but his ministry work appears to have involved compiling and analysing a large amount of information about the Austro-Hungarian empire, which was one of the two principal powers fighting against France through the duration of the 1914-18 war. Sources indicate that his work at the ministry came to an end during February 1919, a few months after the war ended. However, the existence in ministry records of a confidential report he submitted on a trip undertaken to Vienna in November 1921 indicates that he was still somehow involved in international negotiations involving the future of the strategically important Austrian Southern Railway Company (which had to be broken up in response to frontier changes between Austria and Italy mandated at Versailles) as late as 1921.
