= Paul Lacombe (composer) =

French composer and pianist

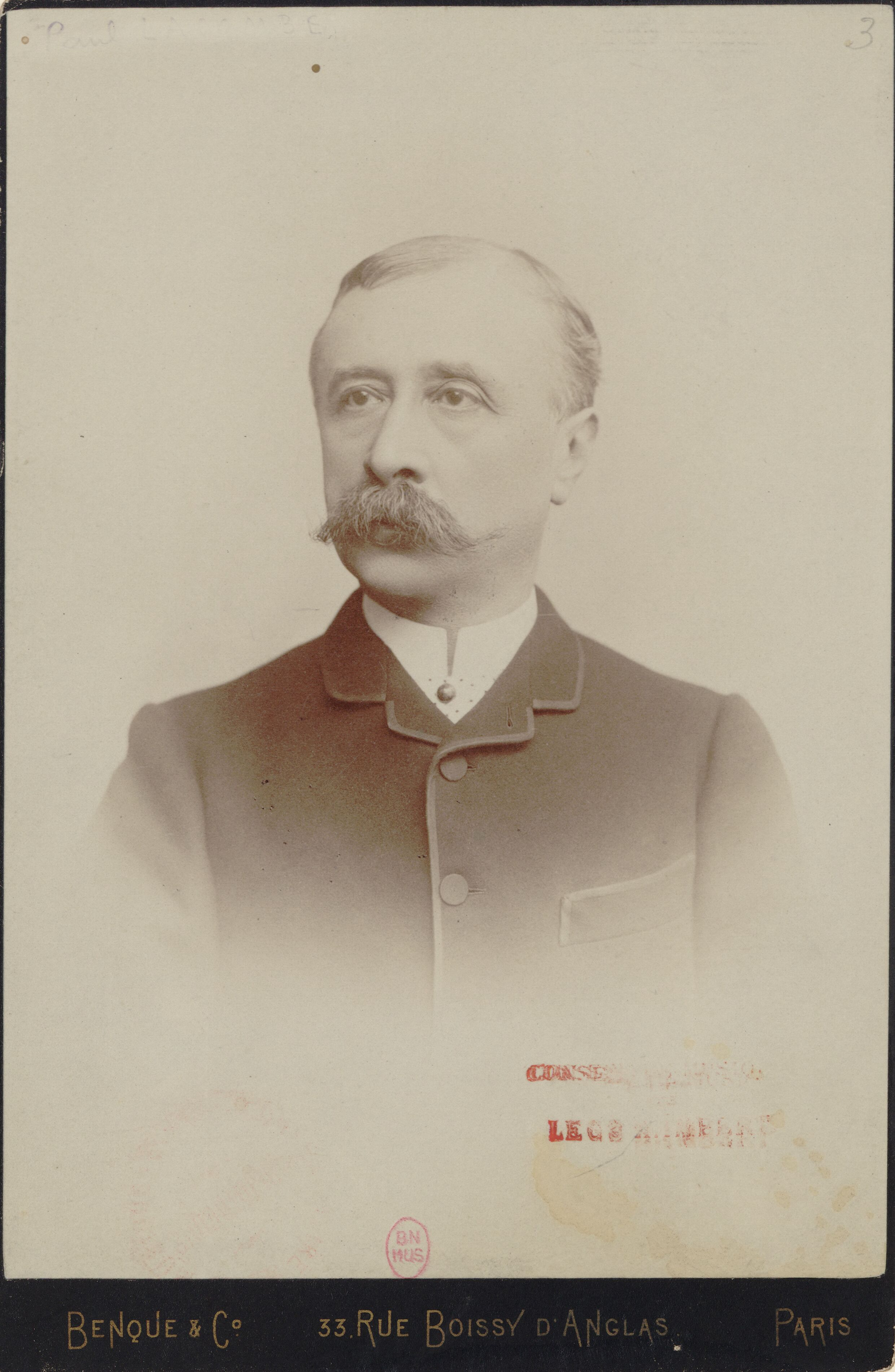
Paul Lacombe, 1897

Paul Lacombe (11 July 1837 – 4 June 1927) was a Languedocien (French) composer and pianist.

== Biography ==
Paul Lacombe was born in Carcassonne into a wealthy family of linen merchants. Initial music lessons were at the piano with his mother and he later studied voice, fugue, harmony and counterpoint with François Teysseyre (1821–1887), an alumnus of the Conservatoire de Paris who opened the first music school in Carcassonne in 1851.

Lacombe was an admirer of the music of Georges Bizet, particularly the opera The Pearl Fishers. In 1866 he began a correspondence with Bizet and asked him to help with his composition. Bizet accepted, and for two years, from 1866 to 1868, compositional advice and corrections were exchanged via post. A real friendship developed between the two as Bizet realized the enthusiasm of his student. In 1871, Lacombe was a founding member of the Société Nationale de Musique. Bizet promoted Lacombe's music among his Parisian peers, and was responsible for a performance of Lacombe's Violin Sonata, Op. 8, by Pablo de Sarasate and Élie-Miriam Delaborde. Having shown excellent compositional control in a study for quartet, Bizet wrote to Lacombe in 1867 encouraging him to write a symphonic work. Lacombe produced the Ouverture symphonique, Op. 22, which was premiered in 1876, a performance Bizet never heard due to his untimely death the previous year. Lacombe went on to write Suite pastorale, Op. 31 (1878), a work praised by Édouard Lalo, and two Prix-de-la-société-des-compositeurs-winning symphonies: No. 1 in B-flat minor, Op. 30 (1879) and No. 3 in A, Op. 48 (1887). Due to efforts made by Bizet, his music was played regularly at the Concerts Colonne and Pasdeloup.

Though Lacombe's music was well appreciated among fellow composers and musicians, it never gained a widespread popularity as he was not willing to leave his hometown of Carcassonne for Paris. A prolific composer with more than 150 works, his only significant popular success came in 1890 with the Aubade printanière, Op. 37. Throughout he retained a sense of classical form and melody, but explored contemporary (i.e. Impressionistic) harmonies in his later works. His compositional style presents, aside from its clean and solid craftsmanship, an amiable and appealing character, but with no particular originality. In addition to symphonic works, Lacombe composed a large volume of piano music, concertante works, chamber music and some 120 songs, many of which remain in manuscript. Recordings of his three piano trios, and the Méditation pour violon et piano, Op 124 of 1906, were released on the Dutton Epoch label in 2021, the first in a series.

In 1901, Lacombe was appointed under the sponsorship of Camille Saint-Saëns to the Académie des Beaux-Arts, who awarded him the Prix Chartier for his chamber music in 1887. He was made a Chevalier of the Légion d'honneur in 1902.

Lacombe died in Carcassonne in 1927. In 1929, the city erected a monument in his memory on the street that bears his name, and honored him in June 1984 through a major exhibition and concert.

Paul Lacombe has sometimes been confused with fellow composer Paul Lacôme d'Estalenx (1838–1920). Some of Lacôme's scores, including in operettas La fille de l'air and Les quatre filles Aymon, were published as composed by "Paul Lacombe".

== Selected works ==
Symphonies

- Symphony No. 1 in B♭ minor, Op. 30 (1879); awarded Prix de la Société des compositeurs in 1879
- Symphony No. 2 in D major, Op. 34 (1882)
- Symphony No. 3 in A, Op. 48 (1887); awarded Prix de la Société des compositeurs in 1887

Orchestral

- Ouverture symphonique, Op. 22 (1876)
- Suite pastorale, Op. 31 (1878)
- Ouverture dramatique
- Aubade printanière, Op. 37 (1884)
- Sérénade catalane, Op. 39 (published 1890)
- Intermède-Gavotte, Op. 43 (1880)
- Ronde languedocienne for chamber orchestra, Op. 44 (1884); also for piano
- Sérénade d'automne for string orchestra, Op. 47 (1887)
- Scène au camp, Op. 49 (1886)
- Marche élégiaque, Op. 50 (1892)
- Parade hongroise, Op. 53 (1892); also for piano
- Promenade sous bois, Op. 54 (1892); also for piano
- Aubade aux mariés, Op. 56 (1892)
- Chanson gasconne, Op. 60 (1893); also for piano
- Sous le balcon (Beneath the Balcony), Sérénade for chamber orchestra, Op. 62 (1893)
- Printemps joyeux, Op. 67; also for piano
- Ballade: Impressions d'avril (1895)
- Intermède for string orchestra, Op. 74 (1895)
- Sous les étoiles, Marche-Nocturne for chamber orchestra, Op. 78 (1896); also for piano
- Rapsodie sur des airs du pays d'Oc in E major, Op. 128 (1906)
- Dernière aubade, Op. 137 (1910); also for piano
- Marche dernière, Op. 150 (1918)
- Dialogue sentimental, Op. 151 (1917); also for piano
- Cortège religieux in E major

Concertante

- Concerto for horn and orchestra (c. 1875?)
- Divertissement for piano and orchestra, Op. 40 (1885); awarded Prix de la Société des compositeurs in 1885
- Sérénade d'automne for flute, oboe, string orchestra and horn (ad libitum), Op. 47 (1891)
- Rapsodie for violin and orchestra, Op. 51 (1891); also for violin and piano
- Suite for piano and orchestra, Op. 52 (1896)
- L'amour for cello and chamber orchestra, Op. 77
- Concerto en ré for piano and orchestra
- Concerto No. 2 for piano and orchestra

Chamber music

- Sonata No. 1 in A minor for violin and piano, Op. 8 (1868)
- 3 Morceaux de fantaisie for cello and piano, Op. 10
- Piano Trio No. 1 in G major, Op. 12 (1870)
- 4 Morceaux for violin and piano, Op. 14
- Sonata No. 2 in F minor for violin and piano, Op. 17 (c.1873)
- 3 Airs de ballet for violin or cello and piano
- Rapsodie for violin and piano (or orchestra), Op. 51 (1891)
- Berceuse for violin and piano, Op. 77 (1895)
- Suite No. 2, 4 Morceaux for violin and piano, Op. 88 (1897)
- Piano Trio No. 2, Op. 90 (1898)
- Sérénade humoristique, Trio for violin, cello and piano, Op. 93 (1898)
- Sonata No. 3 for violin and piano, Op. 98
- Sonata for cello and piano, Op. 100 (1902)
- Piano Quartet in C minor, Op. 101 (1904)
- 6 Pièces for violin and piano, Op. 107
- Méditation for violin and piano, Op. 124 (1906)
- Aubade à Ninon for violin and piano, Op. 125
- Morceau de fantaisie in D major for viola and piano, Op. 133 (1909)
- Piano Trio No. 3 in A minor, Op. 134 (1909)
- Chanson d'Espagne for cello and piano, Op. 142

Piano

- Remembrance, Op. 3
- Absence et retour, 2 Romances sans paroles, Op. 5
- 5 Morceaux caractéristiques, Op. 7 (1966)
- 4 Pièces for piano 4-hands, Op. 9 (1869)
- 2 Idylles: Caprice chromatique et gavotte, Op. 11 (1869)
- Nocturne et Impromptu, Op. 13
- Suite No. 1 in A minor, Op. 15
- Arabesques, Op. 16
- Études en forme de variations, Op. 18 (1875)
- Caprice-Polka in E♭ major, Op. 21 (1876)
- 5 Feuilles d'album, Op. 23 (1876)
- Ballade, Op. 24
- 2 Impromptus, Op. 26
- Aquarelles, 4 Pièces faciles, Op. 27
- Esquisses et souvenirs, Fantaisies en forme de valses, Op. 28 (1878)
- Élégies, Op. 32
- 6 Études, Op. 33 (1880)
- 3 Airs de ballet, Op. 35
- Nocturne et valse lent, Op. 36
- Aubade printanière, Op. 37 (1884); also orchestrated
- Intermède de concert, Op. 38 (1887)
- Valse, Op. 41
- Ronde languedocienne, Op. 44 (1884); also orchestrated
- Impromptu No. 4, Op. 46
- Marche élégiaque, Op. 50
- Parade hongroise, Op. 53 (1892); also orchestrated
- Promenade sous bois in F major, Op. 54 (1892); also orchestrated
- Laendler, Op. 55
- Intimités, Op. 57
- Chanson gasconne, Op. 60 (1893); also orchestrated
- 2 Valses, Op. 61
- Suite No. 2, Op. 64 (1894)
- Printemps joyeux, Op. 67; also orchestrated
- Impromptu No. 5, Op. 71
- Danse basque à cinq temps, Op. 72 (1895)
- 2 Pièces, Op. 74 (1895)
- Sous les étoiles, Marche-nocturne, Op. 78 (1896); also orchestrated
- Pages improvisées, Op. 79 (1896)
- Suite No. 3, Op. 80 (1896)
- Promenade matinale, Op. 81 (1896)
- Toccatina in A major, Op. 85 (1897)
- Adoration, Op. 86
- Valse, Op. 91
- Valse humoresque, Op. 95 (1898)
- Vieux airs (1899)
- Petite valse, Op. 102 (1900)
- Prélude et étude de concert, Op. 105 (1903)
- 4 Études à Francis Planté, Op. 109 (1903)
- Danse d'Aïnhara, Airs du pays basque, Op. 110
- Feuilles volantes, Pièces brèves, Op. 112 (1904)
- 6 Morceaux de danse en forme de mazurka, Op. 114 (1905)
- Impromptu No. 6, Op. 118
- Suite de valses, Op. 120 (1906)
- 2 Romances sans paroles, Op. 126
- Aria et sarabande, Op. 130
- Dernière aubade, Op. 137 (1910); also orchestrated
- Petits préludes, Op. 140 (1911)
- Marche dernière, Op. 150 (1917)
- Dialogue sentimental, Op. 151 (1917); also orchestrated
- Impromptu No. 7
- Petite suite (1921)

Vocal

- Les crépuscules for voice and piano; words by Charles Fuster (1866–1929)
- Bruyère jolie for voice and piano (1894); words by J. Dejean
- Les ailes du rêve for voice and piano (1897); words by Charles Fuster
- La chanson des cigales, Petits poèmes chantés for 3 female voices; words by Marguerite de Baure
- Nuit d'été, Duo for soprano and mezzo-soprano (1902); words by Marguerite de Baure
- Aubade for voice and piano; words by Jean Lahor
- Aubade printanière for voice and piano

=== Recordings ===
- Aurore: Dialogue Sentimental, op. 151. Da Vinci Classics C00517 (2022)
- Lalo, Lacombe & Tombelle: Cello Sonatas: Cello Sonata in A major. Atma Classique ACD22873 (2022)
- Thomas Jensen Legacy, Vol. 7: Aubade printanière, op. 37. Danacord DACOCD917 (2022)
- Piano Trios: No. 1 in G, op. 12; No. 2 in E, op. 90; No. 3 in A, op. 134; Méditation pour violon et piano, op. 124. Dutton Epoch CDLX7388 (2021)
- Chamber Music: Piano Quartet in C minor, op. 101 (1904); Cello Sonata in A major, op. 100; Violin Sonata No 3 in G major, op. 98. Dutton Epoch CDLX7397 (2022)
- Orchestral Works: Rapsodie sur des airs du Pays d’Oc, op. 128; Suite for piano and orchestra, op. 52; Concerto for horn and orchestra; Symphony No. 2 in D major, op. 34. Dutton Epoch CDLX7413 (2024)

== Sources ==
- Paul Lacombe website: Société des Amis de Paul Lacombe (in French)
- Fétis, François-Joseph (1880). Biographie universelle des musiciens et bibliographie générale de la musique, Supplément et Complément, Tome 2. Paris: Firmin-Didot et Cie. p. 58. (in French)
- Martial Andrieu (2013). Paul Lacombe, le testament musical d'un grand symphoniste français. Musique et patrimoine.
