= Geneviève Halévy =

French salon hostess (1849–1926)

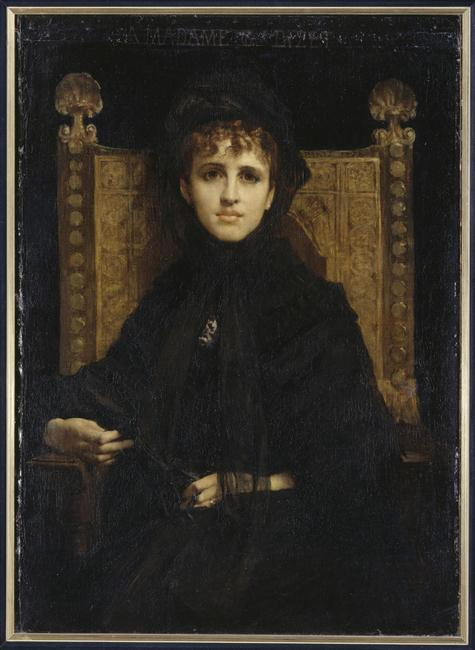
Portrait of Halévy by Jules-Élie Delaunay, now in the Musée d'Orsay (1878)

Marie-Geneviève Raphaëlle Halévy-Bizet-Straus (26 February 1849 – 22 December 1926) was a French salonnière who was the wife of composer Georges Bizet. She inspired Marcel Proust as a model for the Duchesse de Guermantes in his novel À la recherche du temps perdu (1913).

== Life ==
Geneviève Halévy was born in Paris into a Sephardi Jewish family of Portuguese descent as the youngest daughter of composer Jacques-Fromental Halévy and his wife Léonie (née Rodrigues-Henriques). Geneviève Halévy's youth was sad: She lost her father when she was 13 years old, her elder sister when she was 15 years old, and her mother suffered from periods of mental instability. In 1869, Halévy married Georges Bizet, a pupil of her father. Two years later in 1871 she gave birth to their son Jacques. In school he became a friend of Marcel Proust.

Bizet died suddenly of a heart attack in 1875. A year later, Geneviève and Élie-Miriam Delaborde, a close friend of both her and her late husband and a composer like him, signed a marriage contract. However, they never went through with the marriage. Some scholars have speculated that Geneviève and Delaborde were having an affair during her marriage to Bizet.

Geneviève Bizet moved with her son to live with her uncle, Léon Halévy. She opened a salon for her cousin Ludovic Halévy, where she helped him in receiving the artistic society of the time. This was known as Ludovic's Thursdays (Les jeudis de Ludovic). After a few years, she opened her own salon where distinguished society members, such as Baron and Baronness Alphonse de Rothschild, Comtesse Potocka, Duchesse de Richelieu, and Comtesse de Chevigné (née de Sade, another model for the Duchesse de Guermantes) could meet with writers and intellectuals such as Guy de Maupassant, Henri Meilhac, Georges de Porto-Riche, Paul Bourget, Paul Hervieu, Joseph Reinach, and her cousin Ludovic.

In 1886, Geneviève Bizet married lawyer Émile Straus, an acquaintance of the Rothschild family. Her salon became increasingly fashionable: She received Robert de Montesquiou and his cousin Comtesse Greffulhe, painters and journalists. Many supporters of Dreyfus socialized at Mme Straus's salon, including Marcel Proust, who was one of the first intellectuals to sign a petition in L'Aurore at the time of the Dreyfus Affair. After the Affair, the salon became less prominent.

After 1910, Mme Straus became increasingly depressed, and removed herself from society. Her son Jacques Bizet committed suicide in 1922. A few weeks later, Proust died. Geneviève Straus died in 1926 in Paris, aged 77.

== Sources ==
- Jacob, Andrée (1991). Il y a un siècle, quand les dames tenaient salon (in French). Paris: Ed. Arnaud Seydoux. ISBN 2-905429-05-4.
- Painter, George Duncan (1959). Marcel Proust: a biography. London: Chatto & Windus. OCLC 13398363.
