= Halevi =

Halevi, HaLevi, ha-Levi or Halévy (Hebrew: הלוי, lit. '"the Levi" or "the Levite"') means an Israelite man descended patrilineally from the tribe of Levi. Notable people identified as HaLevi include:

- Rabbi Abraham ben David ha-Levi
- Rabbi Aaron Abba ben Johanan ha-Levi
- Rabbi Aharon HaLevi (1235 – c. 1290; Hebrew: אהרן הלוי)
- Adolf Abraham Halevi Fraenkel
- Dana Elazar-HaLevi, Israeli children's writer
- Daniel Halévy, French historian
- David haLevi, multiplle persons
- Efraim Halevy (אפרים הלוי; born 1934)
- Élie Halévy, French philosopher and historian
- Élie Halévy (Chalfan), French Hebrew poet and author
- Rabbi Eliezer ben Joel HaLevi
- Fromental Halévy, French composer
- Geneviève Halévy, French salonnière, daughter of Fromental Halévy and wife of Georges Bizet.
- Herzl Halevi, Major General, Israel Defence Forces, Director of Israeli Military Intelligence.
- Ilan Halevi (1943–2013), French-Israeli Jewish pro-Palestinian journalist and politician
- Joseph Halévy, French Orientalist (Hebraist) and traveller
- Léon Halévy, French author and dramatic writer; brother of Jacques François Fromental Halévy
- Ludovic Halévy, French dramatist
- Moses Isaac Ha-Levi Horowitz
- Odelya Halevi, Israeli actress
- Rabbi Samuel Neta HaLevi
- Shai Halevi, Israeli computer scientist
- Tzachi Halevy (born 1975), Israeli film and television actor and singer
- Rabbi Yehuda Halevi (יהודה הלוי)
- Rabbi Yihya Yitzhak Halevi (1867–1932), Yemenite Rabbi and President of Rabbinic Court
- Rabbi Yitzhak HaLevi Herzog
- Rabbi Yitzhak Isaac Halevy Rabinowitz, Jewish historian, and founder of the Agudath Israel organization.
- Rabbi Yitzhak HaLevi ben Mordechai Raitzes, Polish Rabbi
- Rabbi Yosef Zvi HaLevy (1874–1960), Israeli rabbi
- Yossi Klein Halevi (יוסי קליין הלוי; born 1953), American author, journalist and researcher of Israeli culture
- Rabbi Zerachiah ha-Levi of Girona (1115–1186)
- Saadia Kobashi (1904–1990), the Levite Yemenite Jewish leader who signed the Israeli Declaration of Independence using the name "Saadia Kobashi HaLevi".

== Fictional characters ==
- Louise Halévy, a character in Mobile Suit Gundam 00
