= Le dilettante d'Avignon =

1829 opéra comique by Fromental Halévy

- Opéra comique by Fromental Halévy
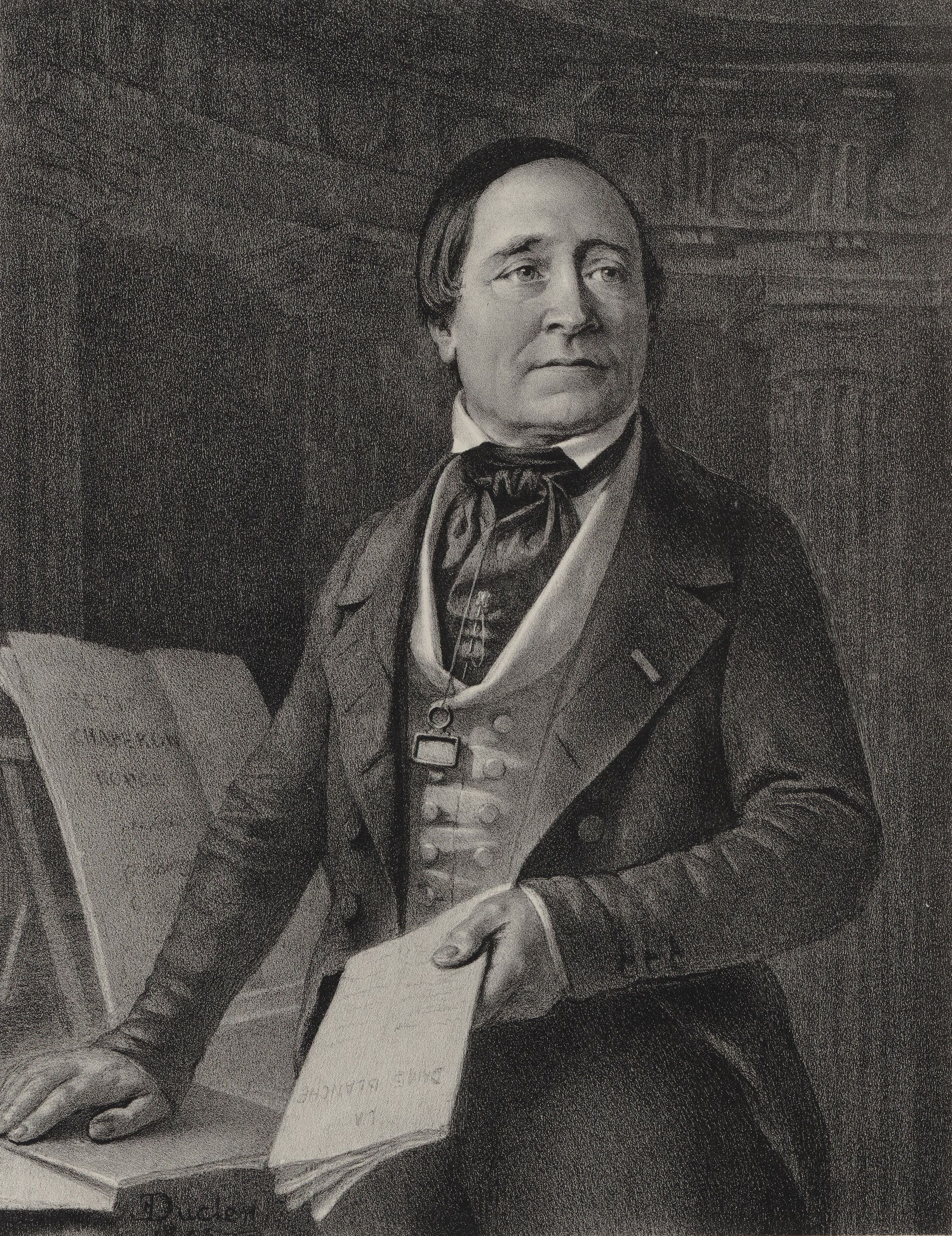
- Louis Ponchard, who created the role of Imbroglio
- Librettist: Léon Halévy
- Language: French
- Premiere: 7 November 1829; Opéra-Comique, Paris

Le dilettante d'Avignon (English: The Dilettante of Avignon) is an 1829 opéra comique in one act by Fromental Halévy, to a libretto by his brother Léon Halévy, based on an uncompleted work by François-Benoit Hoffmann. It was the composer's first popular success, since it was his first venture into opera after the relative failure in the previous year of Clari.

== Composition history ==
Léon Halévy was offered the uncompleted libretto of Le dilettante by Hoffmann's son. He developed it into a witty satire on Italian music, and the work was premiered at the Opéra-Comique on 7 November 1829. The libretto contains some sly fun about the composer; like the imposter 'Imbroglio', Fromental Halévy himself was a graduate of the Prix de Rome, and was at the time of the premiere a 'chef du chant' (singing director), in this case at the Paris Opéra.

It was well received by the critics, becoming the composer's first popular success, running for 119 performances. Moreover, the publisher Maurice Schlesinger was impressed by it, published the score and took Halévy into his stable.

== Roles ==
Role	Voice type	Premiere cast, 7 November 1829 (Conductor: )
Maisonneuve, known as 'Casanova', director of the Avignon theatre	bass	Fargueil
Élise, his daughter, known as 'Corinaldi'	soprano	Marie Casimir
Marianne, his niece, known as 'Marinetta'		Monsel
Dubreuil, singing director, known as 'Imbroglio'	tenor	Louis Ponchard
Valentin, actor		Boulard
Zuccherini, premier tenor	tenor	Belnie
Ribomba, comic singer		St. Ange
Poverino, a soprano singer		Jamain
Amateurs, dilettantes, theatre chorus		

== Synopsis ==
Place: The foyer of a theatre in Avignon
Time:

The charlatan director 'Casanova' (in fact a Frenchman) claims to love only Italian music. In fact he is musically illiterate and cannot speak Italian. Having sacked his French musicians he calls for an audition by some 'Italian' singers (who are the same French singers in disguise). The singing director at the theatre, also posing as an Italian, is enamoured with the daughter of 'Casanova'. Eventually all is revealed, and everyone agrees that the best thing would be to use the best points of both the French and Italian traditions.

== Recordings ==
- Le dilettante d'Avignon Michel Piquemal 2CD 2019
