= Victor Rifaut =

French composer

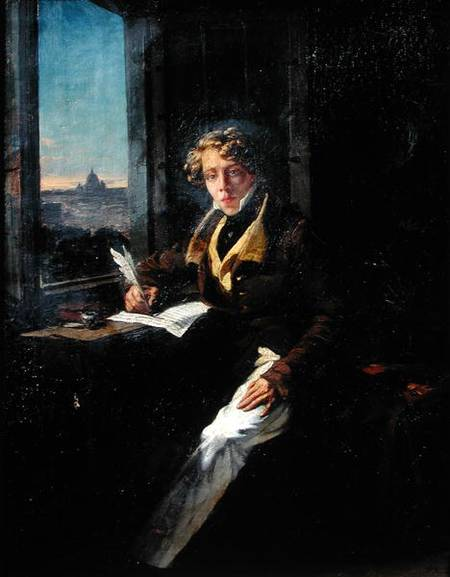
Portrait of Victor Rifaut, in Rome in 1822, by Joseph-Désiré Court (musée des Beaux-Arts de Rouen).

Victor Rifaut (11 January 1799 – 2 March 1838) was a French musician of the first half of the 19th century specialising in opéra comique. A composer of the second order, he rubbed shoulders with masters of the genre such as Auber and Adolphe Adam and often collaborated with them.

== Life ==
Rifaut was born in Paris: his father, Pierre Rifaut, double bass at the Orchestre de l'Opéra, gave him his first music lessons before he entered the Conservatoire de Paris at the age of 13 in 1811. There he studied solfeggio and piano, then harmony and composition, and obtained a First Prize for harmony in 1814.

In 1820, competing for the Prix de Rome, he obtained a Second Grand Prize for composition with the cantata Sophinibe. The following year, at the same competition, he won the first prize with the cantata Diane et Endymion. He stayed at the Villa Medici in Rome from 20 December 1821 to 31 December 1823, travelling to Naples, Germany and Austria. He befriended the painter Joseph-Désiré Court (1797–1865), also a winner of the Prix de Rome, who in 1822 painted a portrait of Rifaut sitting at his work table in front of an open window on a landscape of the city of Rome. This painting is still kept in the Musée des Beaux-Arts de Rouen.

On his return to Paris in 1824, he resumed his job as accompanist at the Théâtre of the Opéra-Comique before being appointed head of singing and pianist répétiteur there two years later. In 1833, after the departure of Fromental Halévy, he was invited to take the "harmony and practical accompaniment class for women at the Conservatoire de Paris", and held this position until his untimely death by illness on 2 March 1838. He died in Orléans where he had retired with his family the previous year.

On 30 August 1826, he had married Jeanne-Emélie Belloste in Paris, a singer at the Opéra-Comique known as Mme Rifaut. Mother of two children and widow at thirty, she remarried and died in 1881.

== Work ==
Rifaut composed a number of works for the Théâtre de l'Opéra-Comique between 1826 and 1837, but none was really successful and they remained forgotten. The most accomplished ("Graceful and light but wise music" writes the Journal des Demoiselles; "A rather pretty little act" writes a critic of L'Artiste: journal de la littérature et des beaux-arts) seems to have been André, ou La Sentinelle perdue, a one-act play with a libretto by Saint-Georges, performed at the Opéra-Comique on 9 December 1834, with his wife in one of the female roles.

Rifaut's musical activity is mainly notable for his role as arranger for Opéra comique works composed by Fromental Halévy (Le Roi et le batelier, one act play on a libretto by Saint-Georges, 1827), Daniel-François-Esprit Auber (La Fiancée in 1829, Le Dieu et la bayadère in 1830, Le Philtre in 1831, Gustave, ou Le Bal masqué in 1833) and Adolphe Adam (Danilowa, 3 acts, in 1830, Le Chalet in 1834, Les Chaperons blancs in 1836).
