= Élie Halévy =

French philosopher and historian (1870–1937)

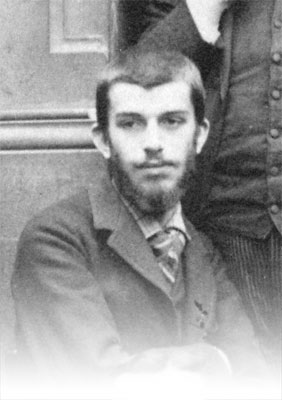
- Élie Halévy at age 19, c. 1890
- Born: 6 September 1870; Étretat, France
- Died: 21 August 1937 (aged 66); Sucy-en-Brie, France
- Relatives: Ludovic Halévy (father); Élie Halévy (great-grandfather); Louis-Hippolyte Lebas (great-grandfather); Léon Halévy (paternal grandfather); Daniel Halévy (brother); Lucien-Anatole Prévost-Paradol (uncle)

Education
- Education: École Normale Supérieure

Philosophical work
- Era: 20th-century philosophy
- Region: Western philosophy
- School: Liberalism
- Institutions: Sciences Po
- Main interests: Political philosophy, history

Élie Halévy (French: [eli alevi]; 6 September 1870 – 21 August 1937) was a French philosopher and historian who wrote studies of the British utilitarians, the book of essays Era of Tyrannies, and a history of Britain from 1815 to 1914 that influenced British historiography.

== Biography ==
Élie Halévy was born in Étretat, Seine-Maritime, where his mother had fled as the German army marched on Paris. His father was the playwright Ludovic Halévy, his brother was the historian Daniel Halévy. His family was of Jewish descent, but his parents were Protestant and he was brought up as a Protestant. Halévy grew up surrounded by musicians, scholars, and politicians. After studying at the École Normale Supérieure, he received his doctorate in philosophy in 1901 with the theses The Platonic Theory of Knowledge and The Origins of Philosophical Radicalism. The latter formed the base of his first major study, The Formation of English Philosophical Radicalism (3 vols., 1901–1904).

In an article of 1893, Halévy suggested that the great moral question of modern thought was how the abstract idea of duty could become a concrete aim of society. This question had first attracted him to the utilitarians, and he found at the core of their answer a fundamental contradiction. Utilitarianism, he said, was based on two principles: first, that the science of the legislator must bring together the naturally divergent interests of individuals in society; and, second, that social order comes about spontaneously through the harmony of individual interests. To Halévy, this exemplified two fundamental human attitudes toward the universe: the contemplation of the astronomer and the intervention of the engineer.

In 1896, Émile Boutmy invited Halévy to lecture on English political ideas at the newly founded School of Political Science, known today as the Paris Institute of Political Studies (Sciences Po). After 1900, he alternated this course with another, on the history of socialism. At the same time he helped found the Revue de métaphysique et de morale. Halévy remained at Sciences Po until his death in 1937.

Halévy's teaching led him to undertake annual trips to England, during which he became the intimate friend of many of the most important scholars and political figures of the age. He thoroughly explored the Jeremy Bentham manuscripts at Cambridge for his work on philosophical radicalism and over the years developed a deep and intensive knowledge of all the sources of 19th-century English history. In 1901 he began to work on the first volume of his masterpiece, the History of the English People in the Nineteenth Century (published from 1913 onwards). In this first volume, he described England in 1815 and sought to explain how England avoided violent social change. "If economic facts explain the course taken by the human race," he wrote, "the England of the nineteenth century was surely, above all other countries, destined to revolution, both politically and religiously." Neither the British constitution nor the Established Church was strong enough to hold the country together. He found the answer in religious nonconformity: "Methodism was the antidote to Jacobinism."

He did not write his history in chronological sequence, nor did he live to complete it. The second and third volumes of this history (1923) carried the story up to 1841. Then Halévy, profoundly moved by World War I, turned his attention to the period from 1895 to 1914. The two volumes on this period (published in 1926-1930) were written with considerable detachment, considering the immediacy of the problems he discussed. Together with Célestin Bouglé he would republish a set of Saint-Simonian lectures of the 1830, bundled in the 1924 work Doctrine de Saint-Simon.

In lectures of 1929, revised in 1936 (published in 1938; The Era of Tyrannies), Halévy argued that the world war had increased national control over individual activities and opened the way for de facto socialism. In opposition to those who saw socialism as the last step in the French Revolution, he saw it as a new organization of constraint replacing those that the Revolution had destroyed. Wallas translates:

The age of tyrannies dates from the month of August, 1914, that is to say from the time when the belligerent nations first adopted a form of social organisation which may be defined as follows:

(1) In the economic sphere, the nationalisation, on a vast scale, of all the means of production, distribution and exchange; and at the same time an appeal by the Governments to the leaders of the trade unions for support in carrying out this policy. State Socialism, therefore, is combined with syndicalist and "corporatism" elements.
(2) In the intellectual sphere, the "nationalisation of ideas" in two different forms, one negative, that is to say the suppression of all expressions of opinion which were thought to be opposed to the national interest, and the other positive. I shall call the positive aspect "the organisation of enthusiasm".

The whole of post-war Socialism is derived from this war-time organisation far more than from Marxism. The policy which it offers to men who have often been drawn to it by their distaste for and hatred of war is the continuation of war-time organisation in time of peace. That is the paradox of post-war Socialism.

In what proved to be his last work (which he did not live to complete), Halévy began to bridge the gap between 1841 and 1895 with a volume entitled The Age of Peel and Cobden (1841-1852). A liberal individualist to the last, Halévy died at Sucy-en-Brie on 21 August 1937. His publishers posthumously commissioned R. B. McCallum to contribute a supplementary essay to link this volume with the concluding ones, the whole appearing under the title Victorian Years in 1961.

== Publications ==
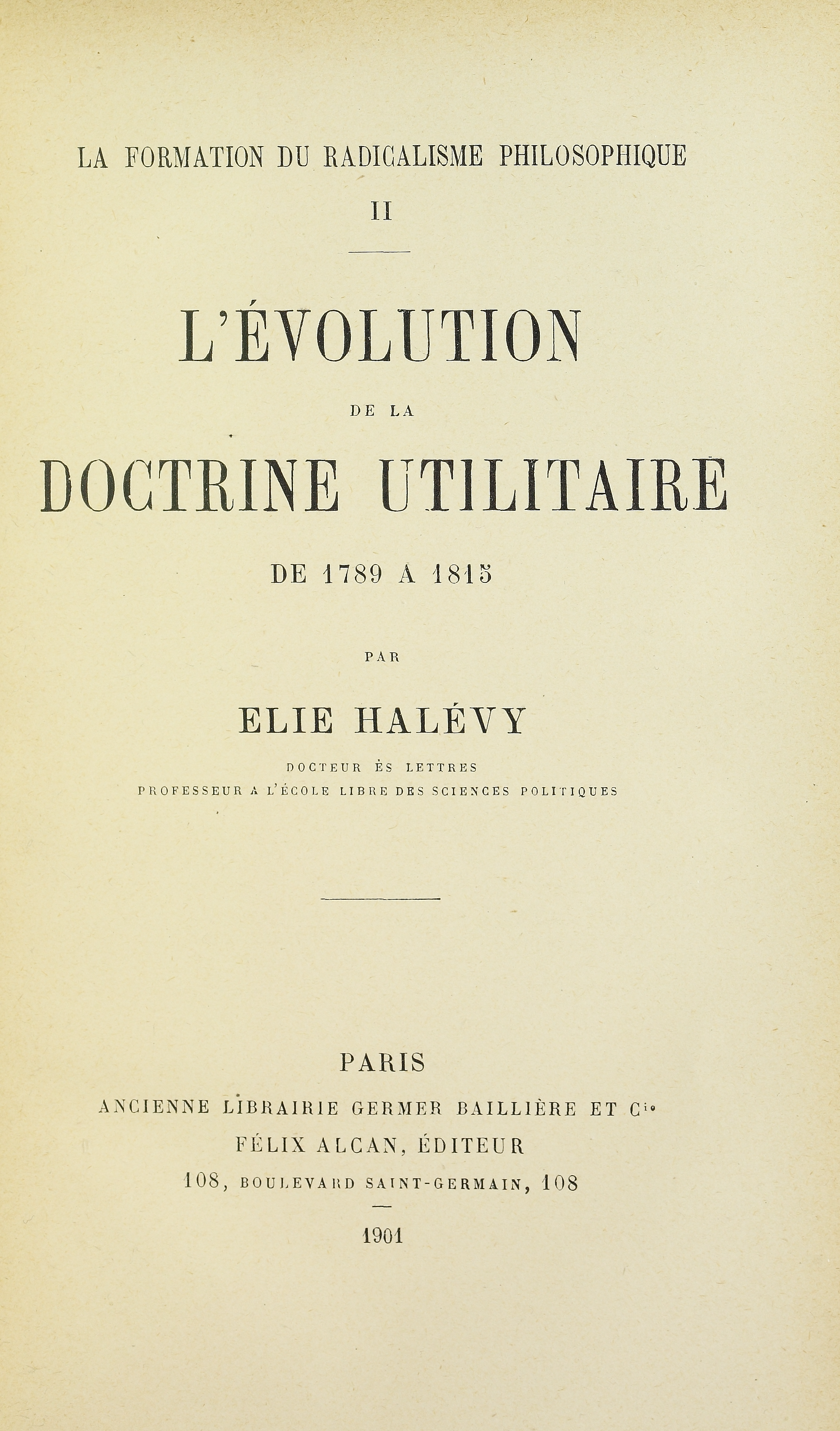
Évolution de la doctrine utilitaire, 1901

=== In French ===
Most of these are online free.

- (1896). La Théorie platonicienne des sciences. Paris: Félix Alcan.
- (1901-1904). La Formation du radicalisme philosophique. Paris: Félix Alcan.
  - (1901). La Jeunesse de Bentham 1776-1789.
  - (1901). L'Évolution de la doctrine utilitaire de 1789 à 1815.
  - (1904). Le Radicalisme philosophique.
- (1903). Thomas Hodgskin (1787-1869). Paris: Librairie Georges Bellais.
- (1913-1946). Histoire du peuple anglais au XIXe siècle.
  - (1913). L'Angleterre en 1815.
  - (1923). Du lendemain de Waterloo à la veille du Reform Bill.
  - (1923). De la Crise du Reform Bill à l'Avènement de Sir Robert Peel: 1830-1841.
  - (1946). Le Milieu du siècle: 1841-1852 (posth.)
- (1926). Épilogue 1. Les impérialistes au pouvoir: 1895-1914.
- (1932). Épilogue 2. Vers la démocratie sociale et vers la guerre: 1895-1914.
- (1938). L'Ère des tyrannies, préf. de Célestin Bouglé. (posth.)
- (1948). Histoire du socialisme européen. Paris: Gallimard (posth.)

=== Works in English translation ===
Most of these are online free.

- (1928). The Growth of Philosophic Radicalism. Translated by Morris, Mary. New York and London: The Macmillan Company and Faber & Faber. 1952. Clifton, N.J.: Kelley, 1972].
- (1930). The World Crisis of 1914–1918: An Interpretation. Oxford: Clarendon. online
- (1924–1947). History of the English People in the Nineteenth Century. Translated by E. I. Watkin (with D. A. Barker for volume one). First three volumes initially London: Fisher Unwin, later volumes and reissues London: Ernest Benn. Second revised edition 1949–1952, including "modifications and amplifications" made by Halévy before his death. online
  - (1924). England in 1815. online
  - (1926). The Liberal Awakening, 1815–1830. online
  - (1927). The Triumph of Reform, 1830–1841. online
  - (1947). The Age of Peel and Cobden, 1841–1852.
    Published posthumously. Reissued in 1951 as the Victorian Years, 1841–1895 with supplementary material by R. B. McCallum covering the gap between 1852 and 1895.
  - (1929). Imperialism and the Rise of Labour, 1895–1905. online
  - (1934). The Rule of Democracy, 1905–1914.
- (1956). Thomas Hodgskin. London: Ernest Benn, Ltd.
- (1965). The Era of Tyrannies. Essays on Socialism and War. Translated by R. K. Webb. New York and London: Doubleday and Allen Lane. 1965. With a note by Fritz Stern.

=== Selected articles ===
- Halévy, Élie (1921). "Chartism". The Quarterly Review. 236 (468): 62–75 – via Internet Archive.
- Halévy, Élie (September 1922). "Where England Stands at Present". The Living Age. 314 (4078): 569–574. hdl:2027/uiug.30112114734020 – via HathiTrust.
- Halévy, Élie (1941). "The Age of Tyrannies". Economica. 8 (29). Translated by May Wallas [in German]: 77–93. doi:10.2307/2549522. JSTOR 2549522.

== See also ==
- Historiography of the United Kingdom
