= Daniel Halévy =

French historian (1872–1962)

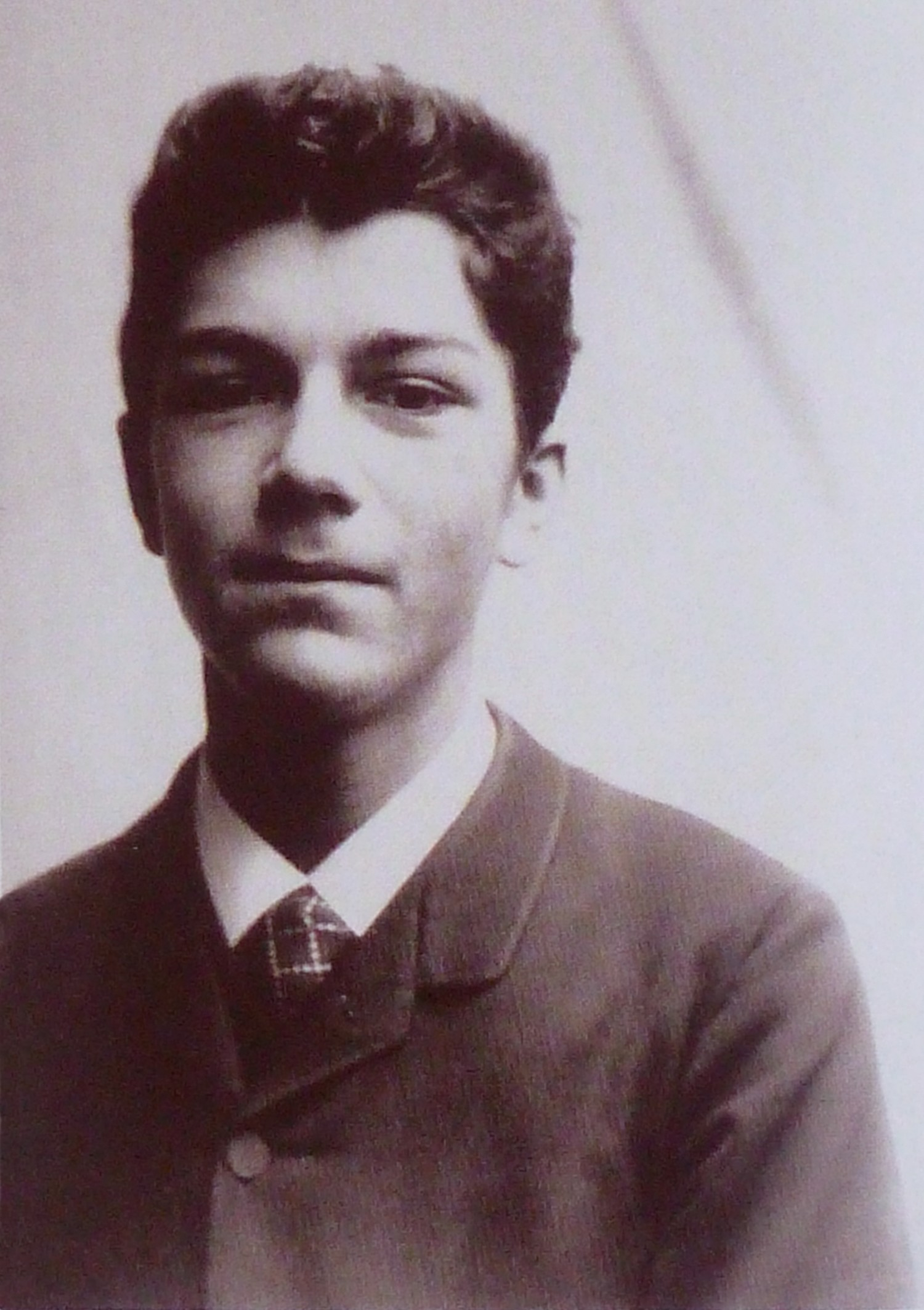
- Born: 12 December 1872; Paris, France
- Died: 4 February 1962 (aged 89); Paris, France
- Occupation: Historian
- Parent: Ludovic Halévy
- Relatives: Ludovic Halévy (father); Élie Halévy (great-grandfather); Louis-Hippolyte Lebas (great-grandfather); Léon Halévy (paternal grandfather); Élie Halévy (brother); Lucien-Anatole Prévost-Paradol (uncle)

Daniel Halévy (French pronunciation: [danjɛl alevi]; 12 December 1872 – 4 February 1962) was a French historian.

== Life ==
The son of Ludovic Halévy, Daniel was born in and died in Paris. His family was of Jewish descent, but his parents were Protestant and he was brought up as a Protestant. He studied at the Lycée Condorcet, where he became friends with Marcel Proust.

Social historians have acknowledged Halévy for his "Essai sur l'accélération de l'histoire" (Essay on the Acceleration of History), while he remains largely overlooked by literary scholars. He wrote a book, Degas parle.... (My Friend Degas in English), based on his journal notes as a teenager and man in his 20s. The book was revised and finished when he was in his late 80s. It was published in English in 1964. Edgar Degas was a close friend of Ludovic and a family friend too.

With André Spire, whom he had met in the Cooperation des Idées, he founded the Université populaire.

Despite his early stand as a pro-Dreyfusard, he later became a supporter of the political right. Following the 6 February 1934 crisis, he lost all trust in parliamentary institutions. Despite his Jewish descent, he publicly declared that following 6 February 1934 he was now a "man of the extreme right". Although he personally abhorred Italian Fascism and German National Socialism, he went on to support Marshal Philippe Pétain's Vichy regime. The radicalisation of the right wing would accelerate after the election of the Popular Front in 1936 and the Spanish Civil War (1936–39).

== Works ==
- La vie de Frédéric Nietzsche (1909)
- Vauban (1923)
- Essai sur l'acceleration de l'histoire (1948)
- Michelet (1928)
- Pays parisiens (1932), autobiographical writings on his youth
- Degas parle.... (1960), In English My Friend Degas (1964)

== Biographies ==
- Silvera, Alain. Daniel Halevy and His Times. Cornell University Press (1966)
