= Lucien-Anatole Prévost-Paradol =

French journalist and essayist

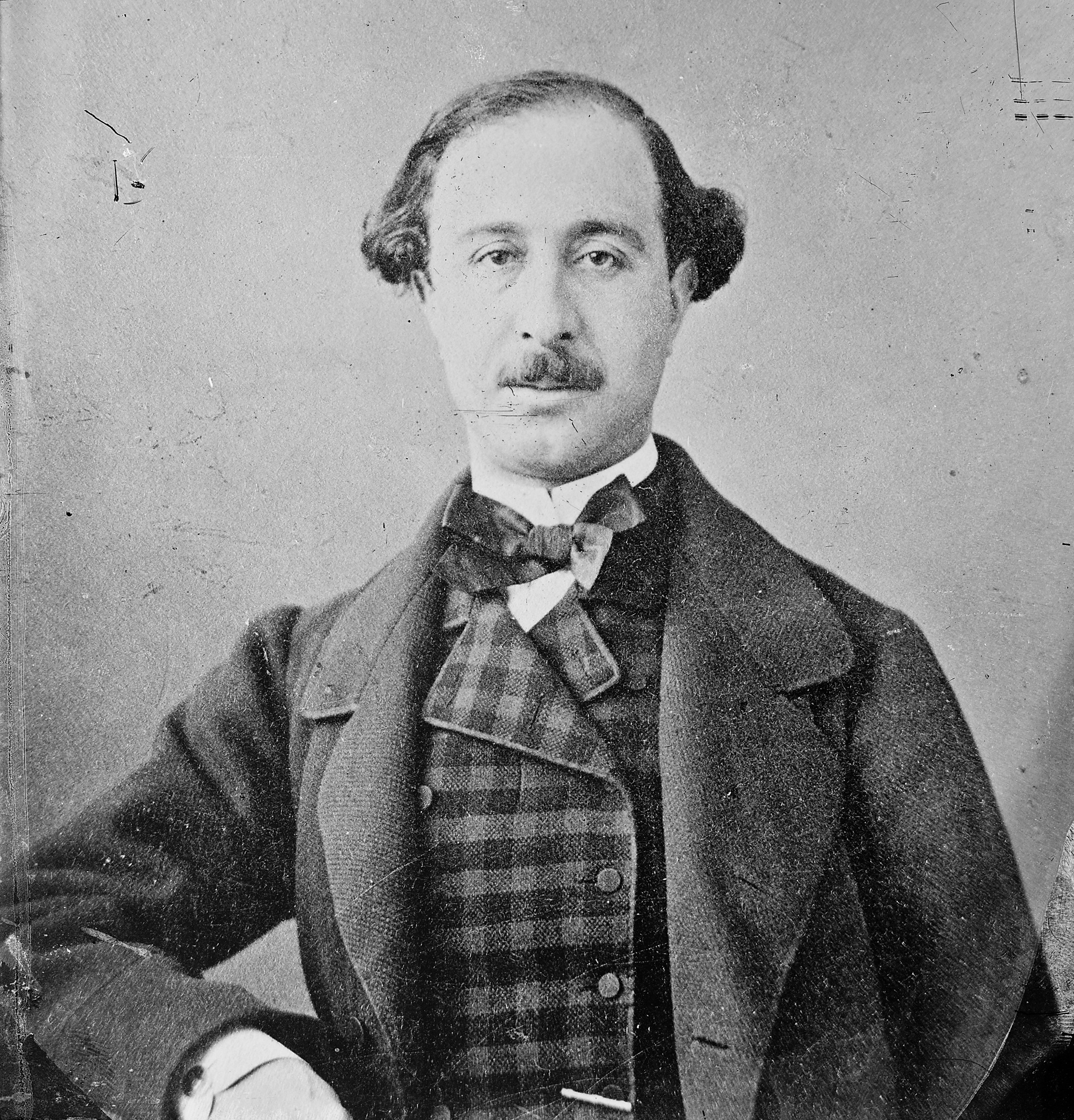
- Born: 8 August 1829; Paris, Kingdom of France
- Died: 20 July 1870 (aged 40); Washington, D.C., United States
- Education: École Normale
- Father: Léon Halévy
- Relatives: Ludovic Halévy (half-brother); Élie Halévy (paternal grandfather); Fromental Halévy (paternal uncle); Élie Halévy (nephew); Daniel Halévy (nephew)

Lucien-Anatole Prévost-Paradol (French: [lysjɛ̃ anatɔl pʁevo paʁadɔl]; 8 August 1829 – 20 July 1870) was a French journalist and essayist.

== Background ==
Prévost-Paradol was born in Paris, France, conceived through an irregular liaison between the opera singer Lucinde Paradol and the writer Léon Halévy. When Halévy later married Alexandrine Le Bas, his wife agreed to adopt the child, who was then brought up with their own children.

== Education and works ==
Prévost-Paradol was educated at the College Bourbon and entered the École Normale. In 1855, he was appointed professor of French literature at Aix. He held the post barely a year, resigning it to become a leader-writer on the Journal des débats. He also wrote in the Courrier du dimanche, and for a very short time in the Presse.

His chief works are Essais de politique et de littérature (three series, 1859–1866), and Essais sur les moralistes français (1864). He was, however, rather a journalist than a writer of books, and was one of the chief opponents of the empire on the side of moderate liberalism. He underwent the usual difficulties of a journalist under that regime, and was once imprisoned. In 1865, he was elected to the Académie française.

August Strindberg referred to him in his novel The Growth of a Soul:

Now he took to reading again. Chance brought into his hand two of "the best books which one can read." They were De Tocqueville's Democracy in America and Prévost-Paradol's The New France. The former increased his doubts as to the possibility of democracy in an uncultivated community. Written with sincere admiration for the political institutions of America, which the author holds up as a pattern for Europe, this work points out so sincerely the dangers of democracy, as to make even a born hater of the aristocracy pause.

== Death ==
He committed suicide in Washington, D.C. by gunshot. He shot himself on 11 July 1870, and died nine days later, on account of the Franco-Prussian War while serving as French ambassador to the United States.
