= Noé (opera) =

Opera by Halévy

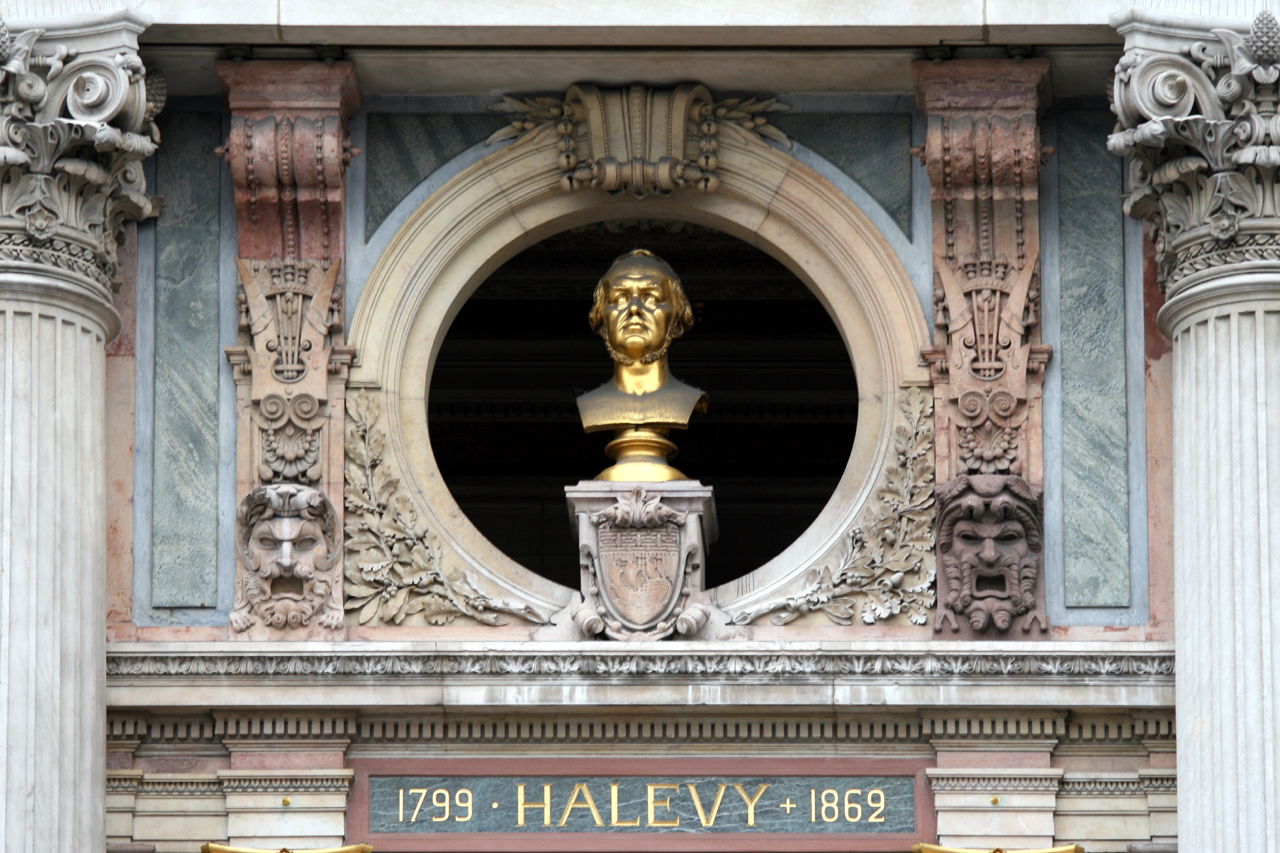
Bust of the composer

Noé (Noah) was the last opera of the composer Fromental Halévy.

The opera's libretto is by Jules-Henri Vernoy de Saint-Georges, who had written the book for the composer's first opera to reach performance, L'artisan (1827). Noé is based on the biblical story of Noah.

Halévy worked on the opera during his last years (1858–1862), but left it unfinished after the Paris Opéra, which had scheduled it for the 1860 season, decided to postpone it after seeing the score of the first four acts. It was eventually completed by Halévy's son-in-law, Georges Bizet, who however was unable to persuade any theatre to put it on. Eventually it was premiered in Karlsruhe in 1885, ten years after Bizet's own death. It is sometimes known by the title suggested by Bizet, Le déluge (The Flood).
