= Yosef Zvi HaLevy =

Israeli rabbi

Rabbi Yosef Zvi HaLevy
- יוסף צבי הלוי

Personal life
- Born: 1874 Vilijampolė, Kaunas, Lithuania, Russian Empire
- Died: March 13, 1960 (aged 86)
- Parent: Rabbi Avraham HaLevy
- Education: Slabodka yeshiva
- Occupation: Rabbi, head of the rabbinical court for Tel Aviv-Yafo

Religious life
- Religion: Judaism

Senior posting
- Awards: Israel Prize (1958)

Yosef Zvi HaLevy (Hebrew: יוסף צבי הלוי: 1874 – 13 March 1960) was an Israeli rabbi and head of the rabbinical court for Tel Aviv-Yafo.

== Biography ==
HaLevy was born in 1874 in Vilijampolė, Kaunas, Lithuania, then part of the Russian Empire, and was the son of Rabbi Avraham HaLevy. He obtained his rabbinical ordination (semicha) from Slabodka yeshiva.

He emigrated without his family to Ottoman Palestine at the beginning of 1891 and shortly thereafter married the daughter of Rabbi Naftali Herz Halevy, the Chief Rabbi of Jaffa. In 1894 (or late 1893), he moved to Jerusalem, but returned to Jaffa in about 1897.

HaLevy was later appointed to serve as the head (Av Beit Din) of the Tel Aviv Rabbinical Court.

== Awards ==
- In 1958, HaLevy was awarded the Israel Prize, in Rabbinical literature.

Halevy's grandson, Abraham Haim Halevy, was the recipient of the 2002 Israel Prize, for agriculture.

== See also ==
- List of Israel Prize recipients
- Halevy
