= Les mousquetaires de la reine (opera) =

Comic opera by Fromental Halévy

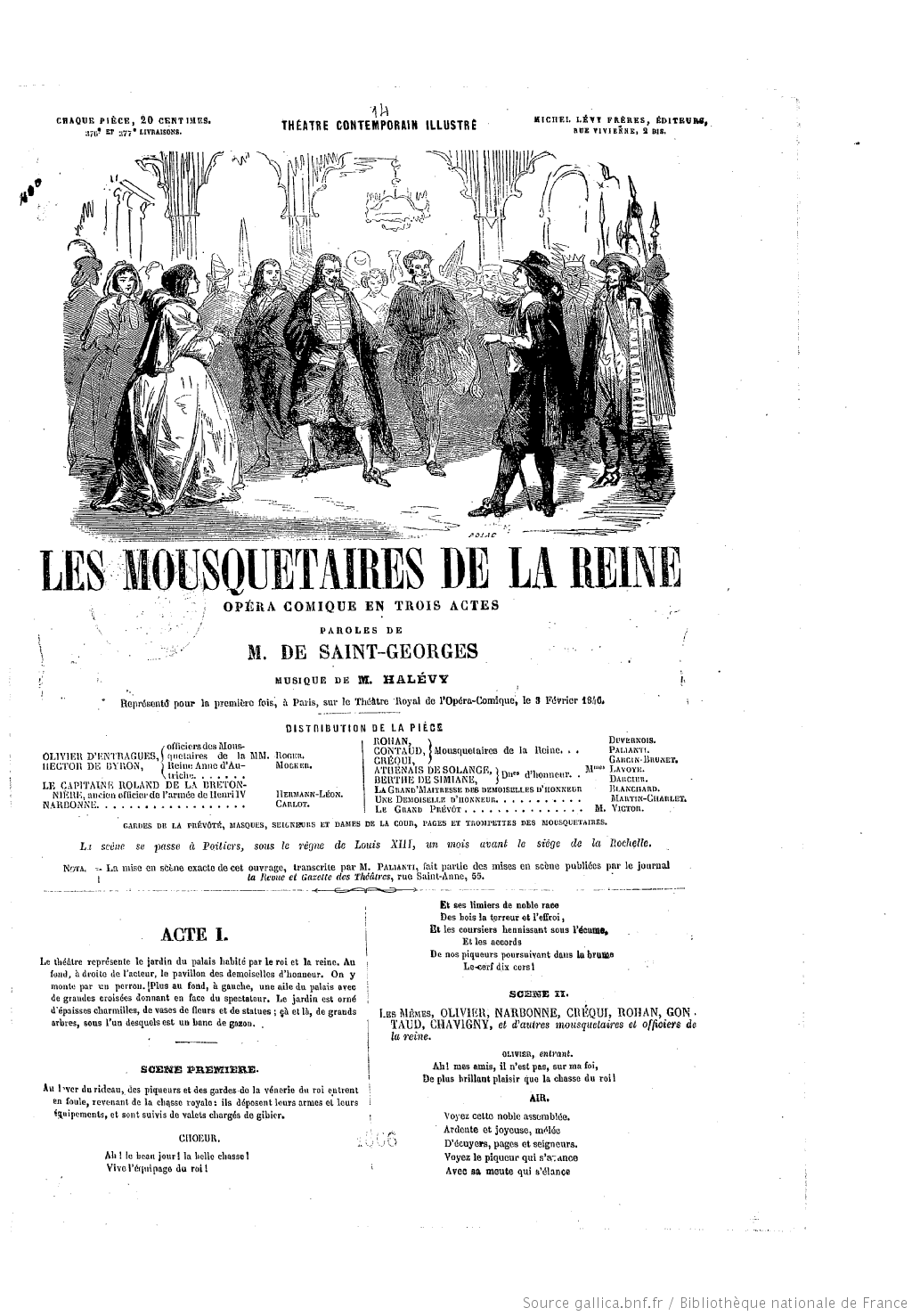

Les mousquetaires de la reine is a comic opera by Fromental Halévy that premiered at the Opéra-Comique on 3 February 1846.

== Recordings ==
- Act III: Couplets. "Enfin un jour plus doux se lève" (Olivier) Cyrille Dubois, Orchestre National de Lille and Pierre Dumoussaud, Alpha 2023
