= Loud Harp =

- Origin: Lafayette, Colorado; Provo, Utah
- Genres: Worship
- Years active: 2011–present
- Labels: Come&Live!
- Members: Asher Seevinck; Dave Wilton
- Website: loudharp.com

Loud Harp is an American Christian music worship duo from the cities of Lafayette, Colorado and Provo, Utah. Their group formed in May 2011, with Asher Seevinck and Dave Wilton. They have released two studio albums, Loud Harp in 2012, and Asaph in 2014. The second album was their breakthrough released upon the Billboard magazine charts.

== Background ==
Loud Harp was a uniting between two musicians, A Boy and His Kite's Dave Wilton from Lafayette, Colorado, and, Seafinch's Asher Seevinck from Provo, Utah. They came together in May 2011.

== Music history ==
The duo commenced as a musical entity in 2011, with their first release, Loud Harp, coming out on June 26, 2012, with Come&Live! Records. Their subsequent album, Asaph, releasing on April 8, 2014, from themselves independently. This album was their breakthrough release, upon the Billboard magazine charts, where it peaked at No. 44 on the Heatseekers Albums chart, a breaking-and-entry chart of new artists' music.

== Members ==
Current members

- Asher Seevinck
- Dave Wilton

== Discography ==
Studio albums

List of EPs, with selected chart positions
| Title | Album details | Peak chart positions |
| Title | Album details | US Heat |
|---|---|---|
| Loud Harp | Released: June 26, 2012; Label: Come&Live!; CD, digital download | – |
| Asaph | Released: April 8, 2014; Label: Loud Harp; CD, digital download, vinyl | 44 |
