= Fromental Halévy =

French composer (1799–1862)

- Born: 27 May 1799; Paris, France
- Died: 27 March 1862 (aged 62); Nice, France
- Occupation: Opera composer

Jacques-François-Fromental-Élie Halévy, usually known as Fromental Halévy (French: [fʁɔmɑ̃tal alevi]; 27 May 1799 – 17 March 1862), was a French opera composer, widely regarded in his lifetime as one of the central figures of 19th-century French music.

A student of Luigi Cherubini, he achieved his first major triumph with La Juive (1835), a cornerstone of the grand opéra repertoire, and which Gustav Mahler considered one of the greatest operas ever written. The 368th performance of La Juive inaugurated the new Paris opera house, the Palais Garnier, in 1875. Halévy's bust stands on the façade, with the inscription "Poésie lyrique" above it.

During the following two decades, Halévy became a leading presence on the Parisian stage, contributing more than 30 operas including grand opéra, opéra-comique, and opéra-lyrique.

In contemporary newspapers, critics celebrated Halévy for uniting melodic invention with learned craftsmanship. Reporters cited Halévy as the leader of the French school; the greatest French musician of the modern dramatic school; and (with Daniel Auber) the most important French composer of serious opera since Jean-Philippe Rameau.

Many of his works were mainstays of the Opéra and Opéra-Comique for decades. L'Eclair (1835) was performed more than 200 times until 1899; La Reine de Chypre (1841) 152 times by 1879; Les Mousquetaires de la Reine (1846) 200 times by 1865; and Le Val d'Andorre, his second-most popular work after La Juive, 334 times.

Other notable successes included Le Dilettante d'Avignon (1829): 119 performances in Paris; La Tentation (1832): 102 performances; La Fée aux Roses (1849): 100 performances; and Jaguarita l'Indienne (1855), the Théâtre-Lyrique's longest running success to that point, 124 performances.

Despite much acclaim, Halévy's reputation waned after his death. By the 20th century, only La Juive remained in the repertoire.

Halévy's works have begun to re-emerge: La Reine de Chypre was revived in concert by the Palazzetto Bru Zane and awarded Gramophone's Opera Recording of the Year (2018). Other modern revivals include Charles VI (1843) in Compiègne in 2005; Clari (1828) in Zurich, 2008, with Cecilia Bartoli; La Magicienne (1858) in Montpellier, 2011; Le Dilettante d'Avignon in Avignon, 2014; L'Éclair in Geneva, and La Tempesta in Wexford, both 2022.

== Early career ==
Halévy was born in Paris, son of the cantor Élie Halfon Halévy, who was the secretary of the Jewish community of Paris and a writer and teacher of Hebrew, and a French Jewish mother. The name Fromental (meaning 'oat grass'), by which he was generally known, reflects his birth on the day dedicated to that plant: 7 Prairial in the French Revolutionary calendar, which was still operative at that time. He entered the Conservatoire de Paris at the age of nine or ten (accounts differ), in 1809, becoming a pupil and later protégé of Cherubini. After two second-place attempts, he won the Prix de Rome in 1819: his cantata subject was Herminie.

As he had to delay his departure to Rome because of the death of his mother, he was able to accept the first commission that brought him to public attention: a Marche Funèbre et De Profundis en Hébreu for three part choir, tenor and orchestra, which was commissioned by the Consistoire Israélite du Département de la Seine, for a public service in memory of the assassinated duc de Berry, performed on 24 March 1820. Later, his brother Léon recalled that the De Profundis, "infused with religious fervor, created a sensation, and attracted interest to the young laureate of the institute".

Halévy was chorus master at the Théâtre Italien, while he struggled to get an opera performed.

Halévy's first performed opera, L'Artisan (1827), though often described as a modest début, secured Halévy a publisher (Maurice Schlesinger) and launched his long association with the Parisian stage. Halévy would go on to collaborate repeatedly with the librettist (Saint-Georges), including on some of his most successful later works.

Le Roi et le batelier (1827), written for the birthday of Charles X, received 13 performances. Some praised its elegance and melody, others criticised its feeble plot and uneven musical quality.

In 1827, Halévy was appointed professor of harmony and accompaniment at the Conservatoire and replaced Hérold as maestro al cembalo at the Théâtre-Italien, where he gained his first real success with Clari (1828), a sentimental opera semiseria in Italian composed for the young Maria Malibran. The opera was revived in Zurich in 2008 by Cecilia Bartoli.

Le Dilettante d'Avignon (1829), a satire of the uncritical French adoration of Italian opera, was Halévy's first definitive success, remaining in the repertoire until 1836, and running for 119 performances. It was revived in Avignon in 2014.

1830 saw Halévy's first major contribution to the Paris Opéra: the ballet Manon Lescaut (1830), which ran for 47 performances until 1832. Attendre et courir, a collaboration with the amateur composer Henri, Vicomte de Ruolz, ran for only seven performances, due to an uninspired libretto. The most successful of his stage works for that year was La Langue musicale, set in Frederick the Great's Berlin; it ran for 30 performances. Halévy's next opera, Yella, was scheduled for the Opéra-Comique in 1832, but cancelled because of a financial crisis at the theatre.

La Tentation (1832), a five-act ballet opéra, was Halévy's most successful work to date, and his third most performed at the Paris Opéra. Based on the temptations of St. Anthony, it combined religious themes with erotic spectacle, exoticism, and elaborate stagecraft, culminating in a celestial battle. Critics were divided: some deplored its bad taste; others hailed it as a dazzling successor to Giacomo Meyerbeer's Robert le Diable (1831). Halévy's choral writing and an infernal orgy were praised. The work had 102 performances over six years, frequently revived when stars were unavailable due to its reliance on chorus, ballet, and effects rather than soloists.

Les Souvenirs de Lafleur (1833) was written as a vehicle for the great baritone Nicolas Jean-Blaise Martin, returning to the stage at the age of 67. It quickly faded from the repertoire after Martin's retirement and death four years later.

When Ferdinand Hérold died, Hálevy, his deputy as chef de chant at the Opéra, was entrusted with completing Ludovic (1833), begun before his death. Hérold left only sketches for the opening numbers; Halévy composed the majority of the opera, including the entire second act. A success both in Paris (70 performances) and Berlin, the work placed Halévy at the forefront of dramatic composers, according to Le Figaro and Le Courrier. In this year, Halévy became professor of counterpoint and fugue at the Conservatoire.

== Reputation and legacy ==
Georges de Fresny, writing in Le Monde dramatique, declared: "Halévy is the French school, as Mozart is the German school, Rossini the Italian school, Meyerbeer the Franco-German school, and Donizetti — by turns easy, suave, energetic, and tender — the intimate alliance of French and Italian formulas. M. Halévy thus represents and personifies, in the most serious sense, French musical art in our time."

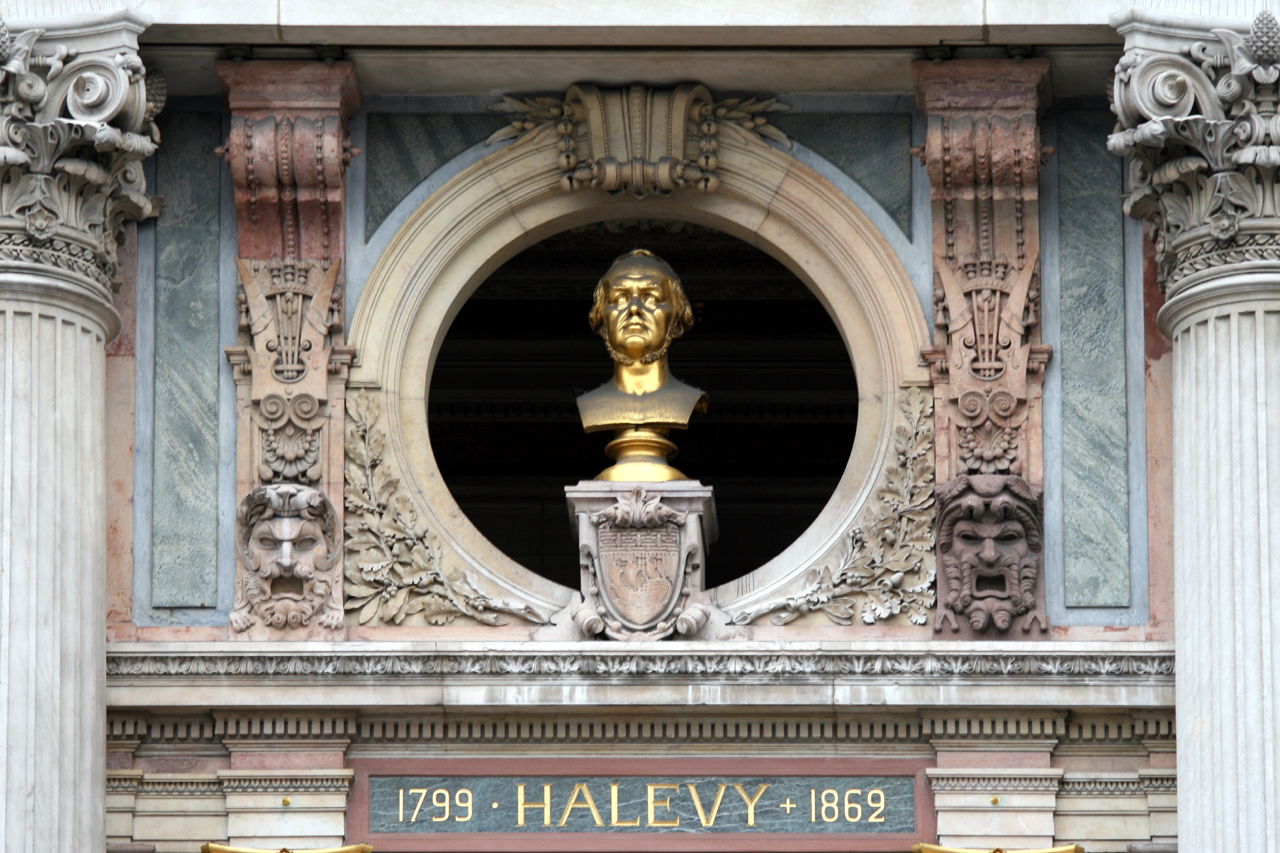
The bust of Halévy on the façade of the Palais Garnier.

Hector Berlioz praised many of Halévy's scores.

Richard Wagner held up Halévy as an example for German composers to follow, praising his avoidance of triviality, his ability to sustain unity through contrast, his sense of historical colour, and his dramatic integration of orchestra and voice: "His vocation is to write music springing from the most intimate and powerful depths of human nature." In that respect, Wagner placed Halévy among "the small number of true musicians".

Contemporary observers emphasised Halévy's fusion of scholarship and inspiration. Charles Ernest Beulé wrote that "the art of moving the feelings by sound, and of rendering through learned harmony the violence or the softness of the passions, is, par excellence, the art of Halévy." Oscar Comettant described his style as marked by a "poetic melancholy", and praised Halévy as one of the rare composers whose music adhered scrupulously to prosody and fused so intimately with poetry, character, and situation that it formed a single dramatic inspiration. Pier-Angelo Fiorentino admired his empathy and ability to enter into the emotions of his characters. J.J. Debillemont praised him as the most original genius of all French opera composers, combining erudition with heartfelt expression.

Félix Clément likened Halévy to Jean Racine: "If a contemporary of Louis XIV, an admirer of the tender Racine, were to return among us, and still full of memories of the Grand Siècle, wished to find upon the modern stage the noble pathos, the lofty inspiration, the majestic structure of the dramatic masterpieces of old, it is not to the Théâtre-Français that I would send him; I would say to him: Go to the Opéra on the days when a work by Halévy is performed."

Halévy was called "the most skilful and the most conscientious of all the composers writing for the Opéra-Comique", composing music more substantial and carefully wrought than typical for the genre, combining spirited, graceful classical learning with a rare ability to express both delicate sentiment and passion. Blanchard argued that Halévy sought to found a new school of dramatic composition based on "musical eclecticism", uniting Italian melody, German harmony, and French rigour and logic, a process begun with L'Éclair.

Adolphe Adam thought Halévy possessed the quality of sensitivity to the highest degree: "No-one handles situations of the heart with as much feeling and delicacy. He is more often subtle and witty than frankly gay; or rather, his gaiety is always of such good taste that it is perhaps too delicate to be appreciated by everyone. But as soon as it is a matter of touching and moving the audience, his genius has infinite resources."

Not all assessments were favourable, however: Heinrich Heine commented that Halévy was an artist, but "without the slightest spark of genius". Edmond Le Blant described his music as laboriously constructed; and Benoît Jouvin, while admiring his intelligence and orchestration, dismissed many scores as over-elaborate 'musical algebra' rather than true inspiration. Adam thought Halévy sometimes constrained his imagination in rejecting formulaic phrases and seeking to be always original, but when inspired, his music came from the heart. Critics such as Fétis argued that, although Halévy's fellow musicians highly esteemed his music, it was often too complex for the general public, preventing him from attaining a reputation equal to his merit.

== Operas ==
Title	Genre	Acts	Libretto	Première	Notes
L'Artisan	Opéra-comique	1	Jules-Henri Vernoy de Saint Georges and Antoine-Jean-Baptiste Simonnin	Opéra-Comique, Paris, 30 January 1827	
Le Roi et le batelier	Opéra-comique	1	Jules-Henri Vernoy de Saint-Georges	Opéra-Comique, 3 November 1827	Collaboration with Victor Rifaut. 13 performances.
Clari	Opera semiseria	3	Pietro Giannone	Théatre Italien, Paris, 9 December 1828	
Le Dilettante d'Avignon	Opéra-comique	1	François-Benoît Hoffman, finished by Léon Halévy	Opéra-Comique, 7 November 1829	119 performances.
Attendre et courir	Opéra-comique	1	Henri de Tully and Fulgence de Bury, after Lafontaine.	Opéra-Comique, 27 May 1830	Collaboration with Henri, Vicomte de Ruolz. 7 performances.
La Langue musicale	Opéra-comique	1	Gabriel de Lurieu and Charles Moreau de Commagny	Opéra-Comique, 11 December 1830	30 performances.
La Tentation	Opéra-ballet	5	Hygin-Auguste Cavé and Edmond Duponchel	Opéra, Paris, 20 June 1832	Collaboration with Casimir Gide. 102 performances.
Les Souvenirs de Lafleur	Opéra-comique	1	Pierre Carmouche and Frédéric de Courcy	Opéra-Comique, 4 March 1833	
Ludovic	Drame lyrique	2	Jules-Henri Vernoy de Saint-Georges	Opéra-Comique, 16 May 1833	Completion of unfinished work by Ferdinand Hérold. 70 performances.
La Juive	Opéra	5	Eugène Scribe	Opéra, 23 February 1835	562 performances.
L'Éclair	Opéra-comique	3	Eugène de Planard and Jules-Henri Vernoy de Saint-Georges, after a short story by Ermerance Lesguillon	Opéra-Comique, 16 December 1835	214 performances until 1899.
Guido et Ginevra	Opéra	5	Eugène Scribe	Opera, 5 March 1838	Revised in 4 acts, Opéra, 23 October 1840. 33 performances.
Les Treize	Opéra-comique	3	Eugène Scribe and Paul Duport	Opéra-Comique, 15 April 1839	39 performances.
Le Shérif	Opéra-comique	3	Eugène Scribe	Opéra-Comique, 2 September 1839	14 performances.
Le Drapier	Opéra	3	Eugène Scribe	Opéra, 6 January 1840	8 performances.
Le Guitarréro	Opéra-comique	3	Eugène Scribe	Opéra-Comique, 21 January 1841	59 performances.
La Reine de Chypre	Opéra	5	Jules-Henri Vernoy de Saint-Georges, after Antoine-Vincent Arnault's tragedy Blanche et Montcassin, ou Les Vénétiens	Opéra, 22 December 1841	152 performances by 1879.
Charles VI	Opéra	5	Germain Delavigne and Jean-François Casimir Delavigne	Opéra, 15 March 1843	Revised Opéra, 4 October 1847. 61 performances by 1850; 22 at Théâtre-Lyrique.
Le Lazzarone	Opéra	2	Jules-Henri Henri de Saint-Georges	Opéra, 29 March 1844	17 performances.
Les Mousquetaires de la Reine	Opéra-comique	3	Jules-Henri Vernoy de St. Georges	Opéra-Comique, 2 February 1846	200 performances by 1865, revived 1878.
Le Val d'Andorre	Drame lyrique	3	Jules-Henri Vernoy de Saint Georges	Opéra-Comique, 11 November 1848	334 performances.
La Fée aux Roses	Opéra-comique	3	Eugène Scribe and Jules-Henri Vernoy de Saint-Georges	Opéra-Comique, 1 October 1849	100 performances.
La Tempesta	Grand Opéra	3 with a prologue	Eugène Scribe, translated into Italian by Pietro Giannone, after Shakespeare	Her Majesty's Theatre, London, 7 June 1850	First French performance, in 2 acts: Théâtre Italien, Paris, 25 February 1851.
La Dame de pique	Opéra-comique	3	Eugène Scribe, after Alexander Pushkin	Opéra-Comique, 28 December 1850	47 performances.
Le Juif errant	Opéra	5	Eugène Scribe and Jules-Henri Vernoy de Saint-Georges	Opéra, 23 April 1852	49 performances.
Le Nabab	Opéra-comique	3	Eugène Scribe and Jules-Henri Vernoy de Saint-Georges	Opéra-Comique, 1 September 1853	38 performances.
Jaguarita l'Indienne	Opéra-comique	3	Jules-Henri Vernoy de Saint-Georges and Adolphe de Leuven	Théâtre-Lyrique, 14 May 1855	124 performances.
L'Inconsolable	Opéra-comique	1	Jules-Henri Vernoy de Saint-Georges and Adolphe de Leuven	Théâtre-Lyrique, 13 June 1855	20 performances. As "Alberti".
Valentine d'Aubigny	Opéra-comique	3	Michel Carré and Jules Barbier	Opéra-Comique, 26 April 1856	23 performances.
La Magicienne	Opéra	5	Jules-Henri Vernoy de Saint-Georges	Opéra, 17 March 1858	42 performances.
Noé	Grand opéra	3	Jules-Henri Vernoy de Saint-Georges.German version by G. H. Gans zu Putlitz (Noah).	Karlsruhe, 5 April 1885	Completed by Georges Bizet.

Halévy also wrote for the ballet, provided incidental music for a French version of Aeschylus's Prometheus Bound, and wrote cantatas.

== La Juive (1835) ==
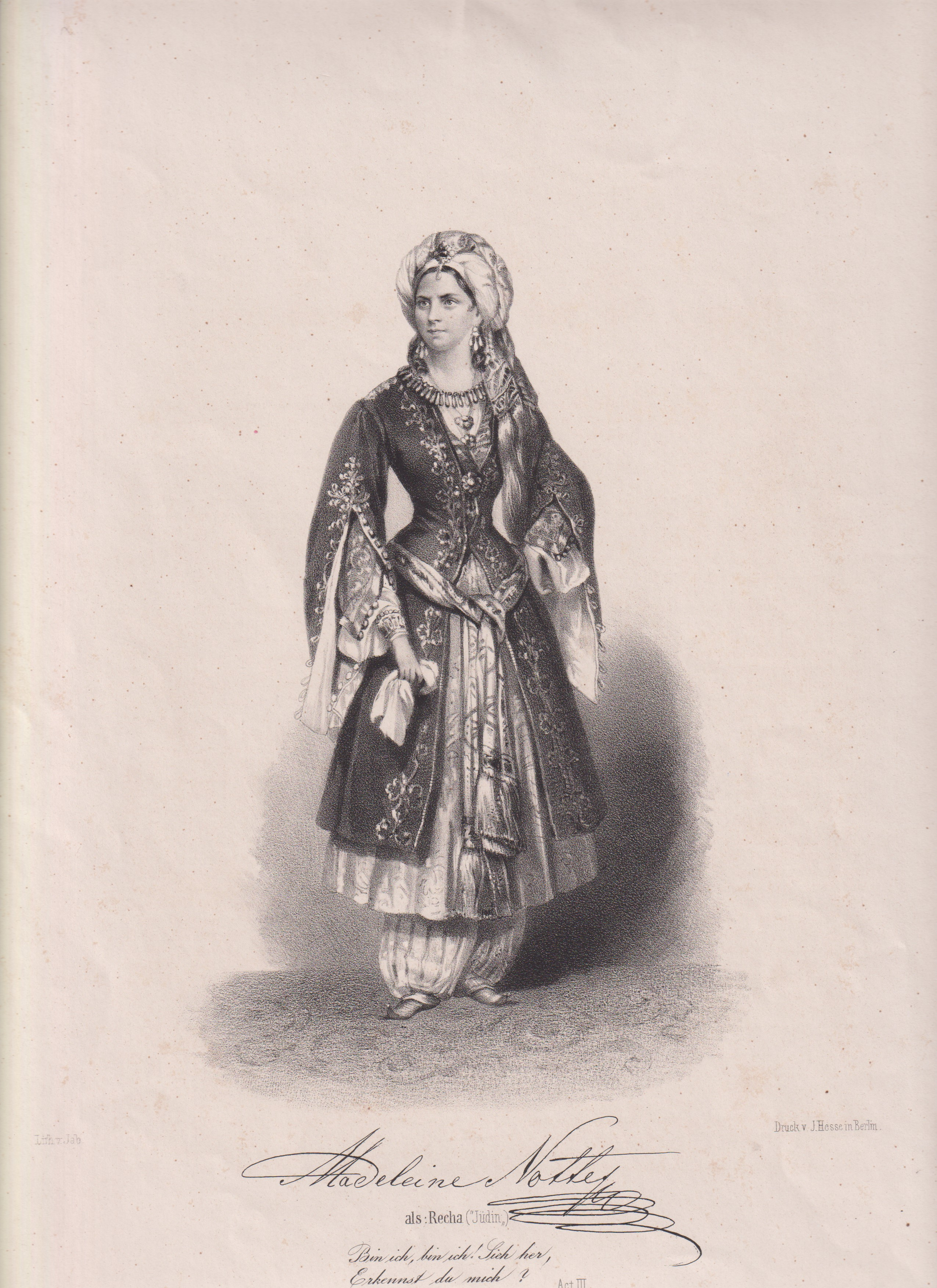
Lithograph of soprano Madeleine Nottes as Rachel in the opera "The Jewess", 1858, in the collection of the Jewish Museum of Switzerland.

With his opera La Juive, in 1835, Halévy attained his first major triumph, a significant contribution to the French repertory over the coming century. The role of Eléazar was one of the great favorites of tenors such as Enrico Caruso.

La Juive is one of the grandest of grand operas. The production was the most lavish yet seen at the Opéra, costing 150,000 francs, with elaborate mediaeval staging, a spectacular procession in Act I, and impressive celebrations in Act III. It culminates with the heroine plunging into a vat of boiling oil in Act V. Critics initially admired the spectacle more than the score, complaining of its sombre tone and lack of vocal display.

The great tenor Adolphe Nourrit's performance as Eléazar and the soprano Cornélie Falcon's as Rachel, however, gradually shifted attention to Halévy's dramatic, learned, and often moving music — especially the opera's most famous number, Eléazar's Act 4 aria "Rachel, quand du seigneur", which Nourrit himself helped shape. Its orchestral ritornello is the one quotation from Halévy that Berlioz included in his Treatise on Instrumentation, for its unusual duet for two cors anglais.

La Juive became the most frequently performed grand opéra by a French composer, staged more than 560 times in Paris. It remained in the Opéra's repertoire for nearly a century, opened the Palais Garnier in 1875, and was frequently staged across Europe and the Americas.

It earned praise from Berlioz, Wagner, Mahler, and Liszt (who wrote a piano fantasia on its themes). Mahler admired it greatly, stating: "I am absolutely overwhelmed by this wonderful, majestic work. I regard it as one of the greatest operas ever created."

After the 1930s, its prominence faded, possibly due to the Dreyfus Affair and rising anti-semitism. Revivals in the late 20th and early 21st centuries, aided by a new critical edition, have brought the opera back into the international repertoire.

== L'Éclair (1835) ==
Halévy followed the grand opéra with the opéra-comique L'Éclair (1835), written for only two sopranos and two tenors, with no bass or chorus.

The opera takes place near Boston in 1797. Lionel, a naval officer, is temporarily blinded by lightning. He is nursed devotedly by his cousin Henriette, and falls in love with her voice and kindness, but when he regains his sight, he mistakenly courts her more glamorous sister, Lucy Darbel. Eventually the truth is revealed: Lionel and Henriette are united, and another cousin, George, marries Lucy.

Despite its modest scale, L'Éclair was considered the most successful new work at the Opéra-Comique since Hérold's Pré-aux-Clercs (1832), and established Halévy as second only to Auber among French composers.

The score was praised for its grace, invention, and charm, although some questioned the absence of choruses and dramatic heft. The opening act was considered among the most remarkable ever heard at the Opéra-Comique. George's entrance aria "Des rivages d'Angleterre" and the ensuing trio "Mais à laquelle, dans ce jour" were admired for their comic verve and elegant construction. Lionel's aria "Partons, la mer est belle", which contains a sailor's touching prayer for his mother and country, was considered the principal musical success of the evening. The storm finale, combining humour and pathos, was also widely commended. Act II includes Lionel's plaintive romance "Du ciel la lumière", the quartet "Tu l'entends bien?", and George's comic couplets "J'ai fait ma philosophie à l'Université d'Oxford", which became one of the opera's most quoted lines. In Act III, Lionel's clarinet-accompanied romance was singled out as one of Halévy's most inspired inventions.

A decade after its première, Henri Blanchard praised L'Éclair as a vibrant musical comedy that illuminated a new path for opéra-comique, introducing vivid, powerful orchestration far removed from the brashness of so-called 'modern instrumentation'. "Both general audiences and artists admired the ease, movement, and abundance of melodic and harmonic ideas. For musicians, it was an artistic windfall — like discovering a drawing or painting by Decamps: full of originality, warmth, honesty, and compositional strength."

It became one of Halévy's most enduring successes, remaining in the Opéra-Comique's repertoire until 1899 (214 performances).

The opera was widely performed throughout Europe — in French, German, Polish, Czech, Russian, Italian, and Danish translations — as well as in New York and New Orleans.

L'Éclair was performed in Neuburg an der Donau in 1977 (in German), in Freiburg in 1991 (in both French and German), and in Geneva in 2022.

The tenor aria "Quand de la nuit l'épais nuage" has been recorded by several tenors, including Benjamin Butterfield, Jerry Hadley and Georges Régis.

== Guido et Ginévra (1838) ==
Guido et Ginevra, ou La Peste de Florence (1838) was Halévy's second grand opéra, with a libretto by Eugène Scribe.

The opera is set in plague-ravaged Florence in 1552. Ginévra, daughter of Cosimo de' Medici, secretly loves the young sculptor Guido, but is betrothed by her father to the Duke of Ferrara. During the wedding festivities, Ginévra collapses after donning a poisoned veil and is entombed, believed dead. She awakens in the crypt and escapes, only to be rejected by her family and husband as a ghost. Guido rescues and shelters her. In the final act, Cosimo relents and blesses their union, and the opera ends in thanksgiving and reconciliation.

The opera was widely admired for its grandeur, orchestration, and dramatic power, The opera's most celebrated numbers included Guido's Act I romance "Pendant la fête une inconnue", which contemporary critics described as the idée-mère of the entire score, a melody of ravishing sweetness and melancholy, which recurs almost as a leitmotif, and his Act III cantabile "Quand renaîtra la pâle aurore". Ginévra's crypt scene in Act III impressed audiences. Thirty years later, H. Dumont (La Comédie, 1870) praised this "sombre, dramatic, gripping" scene: "It is tragédie lyrique in all its purity. Halévy seems to have been inspired by Corneille." Act III ended with one of the most powerful finales of the Paris Opéra. Act IV contained the rousing condottieri chorus "À la mort, au pillage, ni Dieu ni chef ni lois," singled out for its vigour and orchestral sonority, and the closing love duet "Ombre chérie, ombre adorée," acclaimed for its passion and melodic beauty.

The Revue et Gazette musicale wrote: "The score of Guido et Ginévra adds a beautiful jewel to M. Halévy's crown. Standing at the crossroads of the Italian and German schools, he continues with great dignity the grand tradition of Méhul, Le Sueur and Cherubini — a tradition he has revived by infusing it with new inspiration, and of which he is now the glorious representative."

Théophile Gautier unhesitatingly placed Halévy at the head of the French school. "A brilliant imagination, profound learning, a perfect command of orchestral resources, exquisite taste in the choice of instruments, a horror of the commonplace, the finesse and distinction of his melodies — these are the eminent qualities we already noted in La Juive, and which are found even more refined and deepened in this new work."

Berlioz likewise admired this "grand and beautiful score", which he believed musicians would appreciate more than anyone. "It is a major success, and one that will surely add to the renown of the author of La Juive."

Nevertheless, the opera never achieved the popularity of La Juive, and was withdrawn after 44 performances. Critics attributed this to its sombre subject matter, anti-climactic ending, and excessive length. It was later shortened to four acts in 1840, but disappeared from the repertoire after 1841. An Italian version, arranged by Bizet, was staged at the Théâtre-Italien in 1870, and the Opéra-Populaire revived the work in French for the last time in 1879.

The opera was more favourably received outside Paris, especially in German-speaking countries, where it was performed in Berlin, Prague, Vienna, and Dresden. The last known productions were in Mannheim (1881) and Hamburg (1882).

Tenor Michael Spyres recorded Guido's arias 'Dans ces lieux' and 'Tu seras donc pour moi' (Espoir, Opera Rara, 2017).

== Les Treize (1839) ==
In 1839, Halévy wrote two opéras-comiques, Les Treize (15 April) and Le Shérif (2 September), which, according to his brother Léon, "achieved only mediocre success, despite remarkable beauties powerless to overcome libretti devoid of interest".

Les Treize, based on a libretto by Eugène Scribe and Paul Duport, received 39 performances at the Opéra-Comique. Set in an inn near Naples, the opera concerns a secret society of young noblemen, "Les Treize", who compete to seduce women. Two wager over who will win the affections of the virtuous seamstress Isella, but her lover, the innkeeper's son Gennaio, outwits them.

The plot was criticised as risqué: Félix Clément found it "almost intolerable", redeemed only by Halévy's "delicate orchestration, original rhythms, and novel accompaniments". Similarly, the Journal des beaux-arts et de la littérature felt the intrigue was bearable only because of the "graceful and witty music".

Halévy's score was admired for its sophistication, although some found it too complex for the Opéra-Comique's usual audience. Fétis observed that the instrumentation formed an integral part of the drama, so intimately connected to the vocal lines that no substitute would preserve the effect. "In some pieces, the details are so intricately arranged that the music seems to move on the point of a needle."

Monnais (Le Courrier) praised the work's blend of "knowledge and delicate wit, light verve and buffoonery", noting Halévy's "chiselled, embroidered style ... frank and full of élan," and his aversion to the commonplace. Berlioz, too, judged it one of Halévy's finest works, commending its energy and conscientious craftsmanship, though he criticised its excessive development and the heavy orchestration in comic scenes. Le Ménestrel acknowledged the work's larger-than-usual scale for the Opéra-Comique but welcomed its "perfect style, bold melodies, and elegant harmonic forms".

Critics praised the Act I introduction, which contains a boisterous drinking chorus and Gennaio's couplets "Il est dans Naples, la jolie", for their fresh cut and rhythmic ingenuity; the Act II quartet finale, which Fétis judged a "complete piece" full of wit and delicacy; and the comic serenade scene in Act III, where Halévy interwove the popular tune "Au clair de la lune", provoking laughter in the theatre.

In August 1839, Halévy succeeded Paër as professor of lyric composition at the Conservatoire.

== Le Shérif (1839) ==
Le Shérif premièred on 2 September, but was only performed 14 times.

A locked-room mystery set in London, the opera follows Sir James Turner, a zealous sheriff, who is baffled by thefts occurring in his own heavily guarded home. The cast included the soprano Laure Cinti-Damoreau as the cook, Keatt.

Critics such as Berlioz, Blanchard, the reviewers of Le Figaro and Journal des Beaux-Arts highly praised the work, but it proved too demanding for the Opéra-Comique's regular audience. It was, Monnais stated, the complete opposite of "trivial" music that sought to become rapidly popular.

Act I opens with a maritime introduction which Berlioz described as "largely drawn, of rare energy, very true in expression, well written for the voices, and of great effect". Keatt's aria "Ah! qu'une cuisinière" was praised for its mixture of dazzling vocal writing and comic fantasy; Henri Blanchard compared it to Shakespeare and Molière, Mozart and Cimarosa. The trio "Un instant, ma belle Kitty", with its cantabile "Fraîche comme une rose", was admired for its elegance and grace.

Act II contains Camilla's romance "Je vois encore la vague mugissante", of which Berlioz wrote: "There are few tender melodies as well sustained from beginning to end, and as touching, as that one." The Act II finale, built on fugal textures and quick modulations, was judged the opera's most remarkable scene, praised for beauty, comic invention, and musical science; Blanchard observed that Halévy was introducing the theatrical and musically powerful finale to the French operatic stage.

Act III included Keatt's couplets "Ma pantoufle à la main," with their prayer to St Patrick, which critics described as the "pearl" of the score, and a dramatic trio "'Mais ce jeune marin que le ciel nous amène" that Berlioz praised for its elevated sentiment. The opera concluded with a somnambulism scene; Berlioz admired its skilful orchestration and novel, unpredictable harmonic writing.

Berlioz commended the composer's attempt to push opéra-comique into new territory. "Never, indeed, has M. Halévy shown himself so abundant, so rich, and above all so original. This work has a character entirely its own. It made me feel, almost from beginning to end, that rare pleasure which bold, novel, and skillfully coordinated compositions give to musicians."

The audience, however, reacted with what Berlioz described as "a mixture of surprise and fear", likening their experience to watching a foreign-language play. Gautier considered the music too learned for the lighter genre of opéra-comique, while Monnais (in Le Courrier) noted that its meticulous detail and lack of familiar Italian conventions left some listeners fatigued and confused.

The opera was not revived in Paris, although it later appeared in Copenhagen and Prague (both in 1840) in translation.

== Le Drapier (1840) ==
Le Drapier premièred at the Opéra-Comique in January 1840. It was a failure, running for only eight performances.

The setting is 16th-century Chartres during the Wars of Religion. A student, Urbain, overhears the draper Bazu, father of the woman he loves, plotting to deliver the town to the royalists; he is condemned to death for refusing to reveal the conspiracy, but secures a last wish: to marry Jeanne. After the town falls to the king's troops, he is saved from execution by a royal amnesty.

Critics faulted Eugène Scribe's libretto, which they considered more appropriate for the Opéra-Comique. Many felt the bourgeois setting — a draper's shop with gossiping shopkeepers — and farcical scenes were ill-suited to the grandeur expected at the Opéra. It also suffered from a mixture of comedy and drama, and from clumsy prosody.

Nevertheless, some critics admired Halévy's score for its elegance, originality, and refined orchestration. However, Berlioz thought Halévy's music was cold and uninspired, although still technically masterful.

The overture was admired for its drive, although Berlioz criticised the exposed snare drum as coarse and felt the thematic material slight. Reviewers praised the score's "period colour", especially in the introduction and Jeanne's romance "Mon père l'ordonne". Act II was generally regarded as the strongest section, containing a large and dramatic duet, Urbain's aria "À mes yeux s'ouvrent les cieux" (admired by some, but judged disappointing by Berlioz), and a finale ensemble considered the best-crafted number of the opera. In Act III critics praised a comic duet and the dramatic love-duo for Jeanne and Urbain, especially Urbain's couplet "Je ne verrai pas le déclin...", while the final tableau was thought theatrically impressive.

== Le Guitarréro (1841) ==
Le Guitarréro was Halévy's first opera following his departure from the Opéra, where he had served as chef de chant since 1829. Premièred at the Opéra-Comique in January 1841, it starred tenor Gustave Roger.

The opera takes place in 17th-century Portugal during the Spanish occupation. The scheming Spanish lord Zuniga tricks the wandering troubadour Riccardo, secretly in love with the noble heiress Zarah, into impersonating her recently slain betrothed and marrying her. The impersonation unwittingly advances a plot to overthrow Spanish rule; Portugal is liberated and Riccardo ennobled.

Although critics thought Eugène Scribe's libretto was derivative, drawing on Victor Hugo's Ruy Blas and Hernani among other plays, most admired its dexterous construction and dramatic flair.

Halévy's brother Léon hailed the opera as a return to the composer's natural mode: expressing chivalric feeling with moving passion within a richly coloured score. Likewise, Richard Wagner considered Le Guitarrero "a brilliant comeback" for Halévy after "a string of worthless works".

Le Constitutionnel considered Le Guitarréro superior to L'Éclair in scale, novelty, and charm: "Halévy, too skilful a musician not to take advantage of Scribe's libretto, missed no opportunity to be tender, spirited, charming, passionate, and moving. With such variety of emotions and effects, the new score could not fail to advance from one round of applause to another until complete triumph, beginning with the overture and continuing crescendo to the end. The audience was spoiled for choice: a graceful barcarolle, a melodious duet, a lively trio, a tender cavatina, a masterly finale. Each act abounded in music, yet always in just proportion, everything in its place, order within richness. Halévy seemed to have set himself the challenge of being excellent throughout, without the slightest lapse. Beyond the merit of each part, the work displayed the rare and precious conscientiousness lacking in an age of impatience and hasty production. Well known for his learning — sometimes criticised as too academic — Halévy here showed himself at once erudite and inventive, pleasing and powerful."

Le Courrier also called the score one of Halévy's finest works, and recalled Rossini's early prediction that he would go far, now fulfilled with his position at the head of the French school.

Berlioz acknowledged Halévy's elegant style and rhythmic originality, but noted that too much plot exposition took place during musical numbers.

The most striking number in the score seems to be Zarah's Act III romance "Je connais mes devoirs... Partez, monsieur, partez", which Henri Blanchard considered equal in dramatic power to the celebrated tenor romance from Guido et Ginevra.

Meyerbeer, who saw the opera performed in Berlin, described the orchestration as "very interesting", though somewhat fragmented, and observed that while there were many melodious phrases, they often derived from rhythmic combinations. He praised Halévy's sensitivity to the text, but felt the score as a whole contained "too much marquetry", pieced together from small fragments.

The opera was performed widely across Europe in 1841–42: in French in Brussels and The Hague, and in German in Kassel, Berlin, and Leipzig. Its last-known 19th-century performance was in Italian translation in Malta in 1890.

Le Guitarrero was revived by Les Frivolités Parisiennes in 2015 at the Théâtre de la Porte Saint-Martin, Paris.

Wagner arranged several of the arias for flute, violin, viola, and cello.

== La Reine de Chypre (1841) ==
La Reine de Chypre, an opéra in 5 acts with a libretto by Saint-Georges, premièred at the Théâtre de l'Opéra (Salle le Peletier) on 22 December 1841. Halévy's most important grand opéra after La Juive, the opera was performed more than 150 times in Paris alone, and performed widely across Europe, the Americas, and even South-east Asia. Halévy's brother Léon considered the work a milestone: "Never perhaps was he more varied in rhythm, more spirited in his choruses, more melodious in pathos."

The queen of Cyprus is Catarina Cornaro, a Venetian noblewoman engaged to a French knight, Gérard de Courcy. On her wedding day, the Council of Ten force her to break off the match and wed Jacques II de Lusignan, king of Cyprus, a political alliance to bring the island under Venetian control. Gérard wrongly believes Lusignan ordered his murder, instead of saving his life, and tries to murder him; Lusignan pardons him. Two years later, Gérard, now become a Knight of Rhodes, warns Lusignan that he is being poisoned by a Venetian spy. The king recovers sufficiently to drive out the invaders, then dies; Catarina succeeds him as regent.

The press acclaimed La Reine de Chypre as a work of serious dramatic and musical weight. Le Courrier declared it was "marked from beginning to end by the stamp of an admirable talent", worthy to stand beside La Juive and continue the glory days of Meyerbeer's Robert le Diable and Les Huguenots. Berlioz praised the "vast and splendid composition", and Wagner wrote an enthusiastic review for the German press in 1841. (Wagner never showed towards Halévy the anti-Jewish animus that was so notorious a feature of his writings on Meyerbeer and Mendelssohn.) Many critics admired the orchestration and harmony, but Théophile Gautier and Adolphe Adam found the melodies less distinctive, while others found the plot hollow and missed the presence of a secondary female rôle, arguing that the plot moved too slowly.

Berlioz judged La Reine de Chypre a serious, ambitious, and artistically successful work, though one that demanded a second hearing to fully appreciate. The opera's initial reception was tepid, as listeners only noticed "a crowd of striking ideas and even entire beautiful pieces" at the second performance. "M. Halévy's music is not of the kind that can be appreciated or valued at first hearing; it possesses intimate and complex beauties, though its form does not lack grandeur, nor its expression spontaneity — qualities one only admires and loves after attentive examination." Nevertheless, he predicted that its success would at least equal that of La Juive.

Wagner arranged the vocal score. He praised La Reine de Chypre as a model of serious lyric drama, commending Halévy's ability to fuse musical invention with psychological depth and historical atmosphere. He held Halévy up as a rare composer of true tragic inspiration and saw in La Reine de Chypre a work whose example could renew German opera without sacrificing national character.

Later critics also rated the work highly. Félix Clément, in his Dictionnaire des opéras (1869), described the libretto as "a remarkable literary work... perhaps the best made of all modern opera libretti", full of "strong dramatic situations which the composer rendered with powerful expression, profound learning, and exquisite sensitivity". While Halévy's genius shone more brilliantly in certain scenes of La Juive, Clément considered La Reine de Chypre was "admirable from beginning to end, and the richest in motifs of all those [Halévy] wrote. The general character is grave, energetic, tender and pathetic."

Critics admired several numbers: the stormy Act I finale, whose stretta Berlioz considered one of the most beautiful things Halévy had written and which Wagner called a powerful masterpiece; the nocturnal gondolier chorus that opens Act II; Mocénigo's cynical couplets in Act III; the patriotic duet for Lusignan and Gérard in Act III, which Le Ménestrel called "a page that makes an epoch" and Berlioz deemed the principal piece of the score; and the quartet in Act V which Blanchard ranked among the great ensemble scenes of French grand opéra and Wagner thought sublime.

Act IV, depicting the queen's arrival in Nicosia, was regarded as one of the most spectacular triumphs of the nineteenth-century Opéra: Venetian ships, royal processions, fanfares, live cannon salutes, Roman trumpets (borrowed from Napoleon's recent funeral), and massed crowds, clerics, senators, and soldiers in dazzling costume.

Saint-Georges's libretto proved popular with other composers: Franz Lachner had set it in Munich under the title Catharina Cornaro just weeks earlier, while Donizetti, Balfe, and Pacini would all follow with their own versions.

The opera was revived regularly in Paris until 1877 (152 performances) and often in the provinces. International stagings followed in Antwerp, Brussels, New Orleans, London, New York, Buenos Aires, and even Surabaya. It was revived at the Gaîté Lyrique in 1917–18 and again at the Théâtre des Champs-Élysées in 2017 by the Palazzetto Bru Zane. Despite difficulties during the public performance, Bru Zane's studio recording won Gramophone's 2018 Opera Award.

== Charles VI (1843) ==
Charles VI, a five-act opera, with a libretto by Germain Delavigne and Jean François Casimir Delavigne, was performed at the Paris Opéra (Salle Le Peletier) on 15 March 1843; a revised version followed there on 4 October 1847.

The opera takes place in Paris and its environs in 1422, during the Hundred Years' War. France is in crisis after the defeat at Agincourt. King Charles VI, mentally unstable and manipulated by his wife Isabella of Bavaria and her lover the Duke of Bedford, has disinherited his son the Dauphin (future Charles VII) in favour of the English king. Odette, daughter of a loyal patriot, helps restore the Dauphin's rights. The opera culminates at Saint-Denis, where Odette presents the Oriflamme to the Dauphin; Charles VI dies blessing his son; and the French people acclaim their rightful king.

Henri Blanchard in the Revue et Gazette musicale hailed the opera as a "beautiful lyric tragedy" of Gluckian declamation and Meyerbeerian orchestration. Papers owned by the Escudier publishers mounted a hostile press campaign, accusing Halévy of writing in haste, producing music that was conscientious but uninspired.

The most popular pieces in the opera were the patriotic chorus "Guerre aux tyrans"; Odette and Isabelle's duet in Act 1; Isabelle's grand aria in Act 2; the Duo des Cartes; the ghost scene; Odette's romance "Chaque soir Jeanne sur la plage"; and the chansonnette in Act V "A minuit le seigneur de Nivelle". Italian music critic Filippo Filippi thought Act IV rivalled all the most colossal pages of the great masters: Act I of Wagner's Lohengrin, Act II of Beethoven's Fidelio, Act III of Spontini's La Vestale, and Acts IV of Meyerbeer's Le Prophète, Donizetti's La Favorite, and Verdi's Don Carlos.

The staging, particularly the diorama of Saint-Denis in the finale, was considered spectacular: L'Indépendant called it the most magnificent diorama ever seen at the theatre.

Charles VI was performed 61 times at the Opéra between 1843 and 1850, when it was withdrawn amid censorship concerns over its anti-English chorus (changed by decree from Guerre aux tyrans! to Vive le roi!).

Félix Clément lamented the work's absence from the stage: "Of all modern opera libretti, that of Charles VI contains the loveliest verses; its situations are dramatic and engaging. Halévy's music is full of beauties of the highest order. The whole work is such as to awaken in souls the sentiments of the purest patriotism. And yet for many years this national opera, in which we see our ancestors repelling foreign invasion, has not been heard in Paris, while on almost every other stage there has been no hesitation in perpetuating the memory of our civil discord. Our neighbours across the Channel have never carried their courtesy towards us so far as to stifle the memories of their own national history."

A revival at the Théâtre-Lyrique in 1870 gave the patriotic work new topicality during the siege of Paris, though Le Gaulois dismissed it as chauvinistic.

Charles VI retained popularity in the French provinces and abroad, with productions in Brussels (1845), The Hague (1846), New Orleans (1847), Buenos Aires (1854), Batavia (1866), Barcelona (1871), Mexico City (1882), Hamburg (1851, in German), and Milan (1876, in Italian). A Dutch version was published in 1896. The last French production of the 19th century was in Marseilles in 1901.

After a long absence, it was revived at the Théâtre Impérial de Compiègne in 2005 under Miquel Ortega.

== Le Lazzarone (1844) ==
Le Lazzarone, a two-act opera with a libretto by Saint-Georges, was performed at the Opéra on 29 March 1844.

The opera is set in Naples. Beppo, a good-natured lazzarone, rescues the charlatan Mirobolante from drowning. Mirobolante discovers that Beppo's girlfriend Baptista is the lost heiress to a fortune, but his schemes to claim her wealth for himself are foiled. Though Baptista briefly believes her sweetheart Beppo has betrayed her, she realises he has sacrificed his happiness for hers. When she comes of age, she rejects both Mirobolante and her miserly guardian Corvo, and chooses to marry Beppo instead, making his dreams of wealth come true.

Despite the novelty of casting mezzo Rosine Stoltz in travesti as Beppo, Le Lazzarone was only performed 17 times at the Opéra (14 in 1844, three in 1845). Stoltz's domination of the production — she was mistress of the Opéra's director Léon Pillet — was widely blamed for its failure. Critics accused the work of existing merely to show her in male costume, eating macaroni, dancing a tarantella, and later appearing as a drunken dragoon. Her rivalry with Julie Dorus-Gras (Baptista) was also ridiculed.

The libretto was judged too lightweight for the Opéra, and some critics thought Halévy unsuited to the buffo genre. Théophile Gautier and Clément thought Halévy too serious a composer to write convincing comedy; he was better suited to semiseria works than farce. However, Berlioz praised its brilliance and originality, and called it a work of great merit. Maurice Bourges (Revue et gazette musicale) thought it Halévy's most tuneful opera since L'Éclair, and Le Ménestrel thought Le Lazzarone one of the best two-act operas to appear for many years, if somewhat overelaborate. Heinrich Heine admired it as the work of a great artist.

== Les Mousquetaires de la Reine (1846) ==
Les Mousquetaires de la Reine, a three-act opéra comique, with a libretto by Jules-Henri Vernoy de St. Georges, was created at the Opéra-Comique (Salle Favart) on 2 February 1846.

The opera takes place during the reign of Louis XIII, and is set in Poitou on the eve of the siege of La Rochelle (1627–28). The impoverished musketeer Olivier d'Entranges secretly loves Athénaïs, Richelieu's niece, but his fellow musketeer Hector de Biron has also courted her; his anonymous letters to Athénaïs lead to her and Olivier falling out. Olivier unexpectedly inherits a dukedom and fortune, but is arrested at a masked ball for a murder he did not commit. Eventually exonerated, he discovers Hector's role in the misunderstandings; the rivals are reconciled. The opera ends with a double wedding: Olivier (promoted to captain of the guards) marries Athénaïs, and Hector marries her confidante, Berthe.

Les Mousquetaires de la Reine was the first of Halévy's run of highly successful opéras-comiques in the late 1840s. It reached 100 performances within seven months (despite a two-month break due to a singer's indisposition), and was the first opéra-comique performed without a curtain-raiser. Critics greeted it as one of the Opéra-Comique's greatest successes in recent years. The Journal des Débats praised its lively libretto and the freshness and energy of Halévy's score, while Henri Blanchard (Revue et gazette musicale) called it one of the most remarkable scores of the age, placing Halévy at the head of French musicians. Clément considered it Halévy's finest work for the Opéra-Comique: "Everything bears the stamp of his exquisite sensitivity and the distinction of his mind." Léon Halévy saw it as a powerful continuation of Charles VI and La Reine de Chypre: "A chivalric music, full of movement and pathos, on a grand scale, with varied sonorities, and which for 16 years remained the opening piece in every provincial theatre, because all the different vocal types of the lyric stage, indeed all the timbres of the human voice, converge there in a single harmonious centre."

Critics praised the overture for its verve, elegance, and brilliant orchestration, while Act I was judged charming throughout, with a succession of fresh, graceful melodies . Highlights include Oliver's romance "Mais le cerf agile", Athénaïs's florid aria "Bocage épais, légers zéphyrs", which Clément called a graceful masterpiece imbued with first love, and the sextet "Serment des chevalier", considered the act's masterpiece. Act II featured Roland's comic aria "Par la morbleu", the quartet "Mon ami les voilà", deemed the finest piece in the act, Olivier and Berthe's tender duet "Comme un bon ange", and a masked ball finale, including the quartet "Nuit charmante". Act III offered Olivier's melancholy romance "Enfin un jour plus doux se lève", a dramatic grand opéra-style duet "Trahison, perfidie", and Hector and Roland's comic duet "Saint Nicolas, ô mon patron!".

The opera remained in the Opéra-Comique's repertory until 1865, with some 200 performances, and returned briefly in 1878. It was widely staged abroad, reaching Brussels, The Hague, London, New Orleans (all in 1846), Madrid (1853), Buenos Aires (1854), Turin (1858), Rio de Janeiro (1861), Berlin (1862), Jakarta (1866), Barcelona and New York (1866), Lisbon (1878), and Mexico (1879).

It was translated into German (Berlin and Vienna, 1846; Prague, 1850; Leipzig revival, 1895), Danish (Copenhagen, 1848), Swedish (Stockholm, 1848), Russian (St Petersburg, 1855), and English (Boston, 1882; New York, 1883). In the 20th century it was revived in Marseilles (1900) and at the Gaîté Lyrique in Paris (1917–18).

== Le Val d'Andorre (1848) ==
Le Val d'Andorre, a three-act opéra comique, with a libretto by Jules-Henri Vernoy de Saint Georges, was first performed on 11 November 1848.

The opera is set in 18th-century Andorra. The orphan Rose de Mai steals money from her foster-mother Thérésa to buy her lover Stéphan's freedom from conscription, intending to repay it with a dowry promised by the goatherd Jacques Sincère. Rose is accused of theft and disgraced, and Stéphan reluctantly consents to marry the wealthy Georgette, believing himself indebted to her. In the final act, Thérésa confesses she is in fact Rose's mother. The council of elders restores Rose's honour, and she marries Stéphan.

The opera appeared in November 1848, amidst political upheaval following the abdication of Louis-Philippe and the end of the French monarchy: the Second Republic was proclaimed a week before its première, and Louis-Napoléon (later to rule as Napoléon III) was elected president a month later. According to Léon Halévy, Le Val d'Andorre saved the Opéra-Comique from financial ruin: despite revolutionary unrest, it was an immediate triumph, running for 160 performances and restoring the theatre's solvency. The Revue et Gazette musicale called it "one of the most brilliant and complete successes ever achieved at the Opéra-Comique", while Berlioz described the première as one of the most spontaneous and brilliant triumphs he had ever witnessed.

Contemporary critics hailed the work as one of Halévy's greatest achievements. Berlioz admired how Halévy's score was inseparably bound to the text, each melody faithfully conveying the passions and characters as if words and music had been conceived together. The opera, he wrote, showed Halévy at his most inspired, with distinguished melodies, lively harmonies, and some of his most delightful orchestration; few works, in his view, contained so many remarkable numbers. The libretto was one of the finest in many years, for its dramatic interest, natural situations, and skilful pacing.

Adolphe Adam considered Le Val d'Andorre Halévy's masterpiece, and praised its abundance of melodies combined with refined harmony, rich orchestration, and exquisite detail. In Adam's view, Halévy's music showed both wit and delicacy, but above all a deep sensitivity in treating situations of the heart.

Particularly admired numbers include the overture; the goat-herd's song "Voilà le sorcier"; the quartet "Savant devin"; the recruiting officer's couplets "Dans cette ferme hospitalière"; and the lot-drawing scene in Act I; Rose's romances "Marguerite qui m'invite" and "Faudra-t-il donc, pâle, éperdue"; the Act II finale, which Berlioz called a masterpiece; and the drummer's song "Allons, allons un peu de caractère" in Act III.

Le Val d'Andorre was performed 135 times at the Théâtre-Lyrique in the 1860s, interrupted by the destruction of the theatre in the Franco-Prussian War. Berlioz questioned why the Opéra-Comique management had abandoned so fine a work. "In this large-scale composition, where his collaborator had provided him with fine situations, M. Halévy's verve did not falter for an instant. Every number is remarkable in its own way; all are in a melodic style that is simple and truly expressive, accompanied with finesse and restraint. His orchestration abounds in interesting details and in accents whose energy never exceeds the point at which sonority turns into mere noise."

Le Val d'Andorre quickly spread beyond Paris. Within months, the opera appeared widely in the French provinces and abroad, often in translation. It was heard in French in Antwerp, Brussels, New Orleans (1849), London (1850); in German in Berlin and Leipzig (1849), Munich (1850), Riga (1852), Prague (1856), and Hamburg (1885); in English in London (1850) and New York (1851); in Russian in St. Petersburg (1852); in Polish in Warsaw (1852); in Italian in Milan (1876, 1885) and Genoa (1886); and in Swedish in Stockholm (1888).

It was last revived by the Opéra d'Andorra in 2022.

== La Fée aux roses (1849) ==
La Fée aux Roses was a three-act opéra-comique, with a libretto by Eugène Scribe and Jules-Henri Vernoy de Saint-Georges, first performed on 1 October 1849.

The opera takes place in Kandahar, in the kingdom of Kabul. Nérilha, a slave kept by the jealous sorcerer Atalmuc, is given a magical rose that grants wishes, but curses her if she loves another. She uses it to help her friends and is transported to an enchanted rose garden, where she and Prince Badel-Badour fall in love, although he is betrothed to the princess Bedy-el-Jamal. When Nérilha confesses her feelings, the spell breaks, and she is transformed into an old woman. In the final act, she learns that the curse can be lifted by a kiss, although she will then belong to her saviour. At Gulnare's wedding, the Prince refuses to kiss her in loyalty to his lost love, but when Bedy-el-Jamal commands it, Nérilha regains her beauty, and she marries the prince.

La Fée aux roses, Halévy's first opéra-féerie, was his third consecutive success at the Opéra-Comique. The work enjoyed 81 performances in its first year, and remained in the repertory for four more seasons, reaching 100 performances.

Critics generally praised the music if not always the libretto. P. A. Fiorentino (Le Constitutionnel) admired the score's poetry, freshness, and orchestration; and Henri Blanchard in the Revue et Gazette musicale admired its seductive colour, charming melodies, and fine harmonies; Le Ménestrel thought it showcased Halévy's style at its best, with novel harmonies and rhythms; and Berlioz found the score rich and brilliant, although perhaps too abundant. Detractors, however, accused Halévy of overproduction and artificiality: Benoît Jouvin in Le Sylphide found the music bizarre and calculated, while Edmond Le Blant in La tribune des artistes complained that Halévy wrote too much too hastily.

Act 1 includes Atalmuc's aria, "Art divin qui faisait ma gloire"; Nérilha's romance "Près de toi je crois revivre"; and the soprano trio "Désir de fille" which critics like Berlioz, Fiorentino, and Jouvin called one of Halévy's most ravishing inspirations. A comic ballet of dancing brooms, adapted from Goethe's Sorcerer's Apprentice, delighted audiences. Act II includes Nérilha's bravura aria "O suave et douce merveille!" and couplets "En dormant, en dormant", which Le Ménestrel likened to Mozart for concision and purity. Act III ends with Nérilha and the Sultan's duet, its stretta like the last rocket of a brilliant firework display (Le Corsaire)

The opera was performed in Brussels (1850) and New Orleans (1851); in German translation in Leipzig (1850); in Polish in Warsaw (1855); and in Russian in St. Petersburg (1855). Its last revivals were at the Théâtre Lyrique de la Galerie Vincenne in 1897 and in Geneva in 1898

Tulou composed a Fantaisie brillant for flute on the opéra. Stephen Preston's performance was issued on the album Flute Collection (Amon Ra CDSAR019).

== La Tempesta (1850) ==
La Tempesta, a grand opera in a prologue and three acts, with a libretto by Eugène Scribe after Shakespeare's The Tempest, was first performed at Her Majesty's Theatre, London, on 7 June 1850, conducted by Michael Balfe. It was later staged in a shortened two-act version at the Théâtre-Italien, Paris, on 25 February 1851.

The impresario Benjamin Lumley originally intended the work for Felix Mendelssohn, who declined; after his death, Lumley engaged Halévy. Lumley deliberately asked Halévy to write in the style of early 19th-century Italian opera, because London audiences were not used to the newer Verdian idiom.

The Sun praised the work as "the most beautiful grand opera and the most superb spectacle ever produced on the English lyrical stage", while the Daily News considered it Halévy's masterpiece. P. A. Fiorentino (Le Constitutionnel) judged it virile and mature. Others were less impressed: The Musical World and Henry Chorley faulted both Halévy's music and libretto, and The Morning Herald thought the score was mechanical and lacked melody. Halévy's brother Léon thought that although Caliban's role contained some beautiful passages, the opera did not have a clear colour; the work was brilliant but composite; without damaging Halévy's reputation, it added nothing to it.

La Tempesta ran for only lasted 13 performances, closing when the ballerina Carlotta Grisi (dancing the role of Ariel) left the cast. The Paris staging — performed against Halévy and Scribe's wishes — fared no better; it closed after eight performances.

La Tempesta was revived at the Wexford Festival Opera in 2022.

== La Dame de pique (1850) ==
La Dame de Pique, an opéra-comique in 3 acts, with a libretto by Eugène Scribe, after Alexander Pushkin, was first performed at the Opéra-Comique (2nd Salle Favart) on 28 December 1850. It ran for 47 performances.

The opera takes place in Russia in 1762 at the end of Peter III's brief reign. The ageing Princess Polowska, a favourite of Catherine the Great, is surrounded by three men: the disgraced officer Constantin Nelidoff; the gambler Prince Zizianow; and the freed serf Roskaw. She is believed to possess a secret for winning at cards. When Constantin defends her honour, he is condemned to the salt mines, but he regains his fortune and honour. In the last act, set at the spa of Karlsbad, Zizianow loses everything to a mysterious woman dressed as the Queen of Spades, who turns out to be the Princess's cousin in disguise, and reveals that the supposed magic was mere court deception.

Contemporary critics praised its scale, vitality, and orchestral brilliance. The Revue et Gazette musicale hailed it as "one of the most brilliant and strongest works" in the Opéra-Comique's repertoire, while Théophile Gautier described the première as a continuous ovation. L'Artiste called it a little masterpiece uniting the elegance of opéra-comique with the grandeur of serious opera: "A happy mixture of moving and sweet situations, energy and grace, passion and wit, comedy and drama, and a charming surprise for dénouement".

Reviewers admired Halévy's music. Stéphan de la Madélaine called the "magnificent score a jewel case whose smallest diamond is priceless", and Le Ménestrel judged it among the composer's most masterful works. Some dissenting critics, however, found the music overwrought. Berlioz thought the score less inspired than Halévy's earlier operas and objected to its heavy percussion, while the Revue des Deux Mondes thought it one of Halévy's worst operas, complaining of a destitution of musical ideas and overreliance on orchestral effects.

The overture was admired for its picturesque orchestration, beginning with muted strings and bells that reappear in the Act 2 mine scene. Act 2 features a duet that erupts into a turbulent miners' chorus; Henri Blanchard (Revue et Gazette musicale de Paris) thought the most remarkable piece in the score, and considered it the most energetic depiction of anger since Lesueur's La Caverne 60 years before. Other highlights included the Princess's dramatic duet with Roskaw; the Act III ensemble with the Princess's couplets "Je suis bossue", encored nightly; her nocturne love duet with Constantin, which P.-A. Fiorentino (Le Corsaire) called one of the most beautiful pieces ever heard in the theatre; and the gambling scenes in the finale, which Blanchard thought equalled or surpassed those in Boieldieu's La Dame blanche (1825).

Scribe's libretto received a mixed response. Blanchard described it as a hybrid of drama, comedy, opéra-comique, tragédie lyrique and féerie — "the most dazzling fireworks display imaginable", overflowing with wit, invention, and visual brilliance, though perhaps too intricate for the stage. However, the public was captivated by the ingenious tricks and witty details, Le Ménestrel reported. Other critics were less impressed: Léon Halévy found the libretto weak, and Félix Clément judged the plot forced and improbable.

== Le Juif errant (1852) ==
Le Juif errant, a grand opéra in 5 acts, with a libretto by Eugène Scribe and Jules-Henri Vernoy de Saint-Georges, was first performed at the Théâtre de l'Opéra (Salle Le Peletier) on 23 April 1852.

Based on the legend of the Wandering Jew, it combined biblical myth, mediaeval history, spectacular stagecraft, lavish sets, ballets (a 'Bee-Dance' featuring Marie Taglioni), and effects including electric lighting and newly invented saxtubas. Sometimes considered Halévy's most powerful grand opéra after La Juive, even one of the most powerful contemporary scores. It ran for two seasons (49 performances), but was rarely staged outside Paris (Brussels, 1854).

Set in 1190 across Antwerp, the Balkans, and Constantinople, Le Juif errant follows Ashvérus, the Wandering Jew, condemned to roam the earth without rest until the Last Judgment. He saves the infant Irène, daughter of the murdered Countess of Flanders, and entrusts her to his descendant Théodora. Twelve years later, Irène is abducted by brigands and sold to the Byzantine emperor Nicéphore, but divine intervention reveals her royal birth. Raised to the throne, she loves Théodora's brother Léon, also of Ashvérus's line. Their love defies fate, but tragedy strikes as Léon is slain. Ashvérus remains immortal, cursed to wander forever. Théophile Gautier interpreted the Wandering Jew symbolically as "humanity marching on in search of an idea".

The music was praised for its clarity, colour, and large-scale choruses. Highlights included Ashvérus's Act I romance "Ah! sur ton front de rose" and duet with Théodora; a four-bass brigands' quartet; Léon and Irène's Act IV love duet; and the vast Act V Judgement Day tableau — accompanied by trumpets, trombones, and choirs of angels and demons. However, some critics faulted orchestral excess and heavy brass.

Alphonse de Calonne (Revue contemporaine) hailed Le Juif errant as "an immense, colossal work, a poem of opera mingled with history and steeped in the fantastic", summing up all the advances of musical harmony and lyric art. Halévy, he claimed, had pushed musical science to its furthest limits, leaving future composers only fragments to glean. Scribe and Saint-Georges, too, had exhausted the possibilities of powerful dramatic situations. The production was "the ultimate limit of dazzling and fascinating through scenic marvels". Within five hours and a thousand feet of stage space, audiences beheld an apocalyptic spectacle:

"There are effects of electric light illuminating the stage; clouds that move across the sky; stars that rise or sink; new instruments that fold upon themselves twenty times before opening their wide mouths to vomit floods of harmony into the hall; the sea beating against the rocks; the moon that shines and then fades behind the clouds; the trumpets of the Last Judgment; angels traversing space; the earth that trembles; tombs opening to yield their prey to celestial justice; hell devouring the damned; heaven calling the elect.

"It is the North, it is the East, the storm, the sun, night and day; splendid palaces and imposing ruins; enchanted gardens, gushing fountains, buzzing bees — the earth, the sea, the sky, all that exists and all that one dreams, all that one sees and all that one divines, all that one can touch with a finger and all that one would not dare to imagine without terror. It is, finally, the end of ends — for everything, in the end, must end."

== Later career ==
Halévy was elected to the Institut de France in 1836. He became a leading bureaucrat of the arts, becoming Secretary of the Académie des Beaux-Arts and presiding over committees to determine the standard pitch of orchestral A, to award prizes for operettas, etc.

He became professor of composition at the Conservatoire in 1840. He had many notable students. See: List of music students by teacher: G to J#Fromental Halévy.

The artist Eugène Delacroix described Halévy's decline in his diaries (5 February 1855):

I went on to Halévy's house, where the heat from his stove was suffocating. His wretched wife has crammed his house with bric-a-brac and old furniture, and this new craze will end by driving him to a lunatic asylum. He has changed and looks much older, like a man who is being dragged on against his will. How can he possibly do serious work in this confusion? His new position at the Academy must take up a great deal of his time and make it more and more difficult for him to find the peace and quiet he needs for his work. Left that inferno as quickly as possible. The breath of the streets seemed positively delicious.

Halévy's cantata Prométhée enchaîné was premiered in 1849 at the Paris Conservatoire and is generally considered the first mainstream western orchestral composition to use quarter tones.

Halévy died in retirement at Nice in 1862, aged 62, leaving his last opera Noé unfinished. It was completed by his former student and son-in-law Georges Bizet, but was not performed until ten years after Bizet's own death.

== Halévy's family ==
Halévy's wife, Léonie (sister of Eugénie Foa) who had experienced serious mental problems during their marriage, underwent a remarkable recovery after his death and became a talented sculptor (she was 20 years younger than he.) In 1869, their daughter Geneviève married the composer Georges Bizet, who had been one of Halévy's pupils at the Conservatoire. After Bizet's death and an alliance with Élie-Miriam Delaborde, the son of Charles-Valentin Alkan, Geneviève married a banker with Rothschild connections and became a leading Parisian salonnière. Amongst the guests at her soirées was the young Marcel Proust, who used her as one of the models for the Duchesse de Guermantes in his epic In Search of Lost Time.

Halévy's brother was the writer and historian Léon Halévy, who wrote an early biography of his brother and was the father of Ludovic Halévy, librettist of many French operas, including Bizet's Carmen and Jacques Offenbach's Orpheus in the Underworld. Léon was also the father, by his mistress Lucinde Paradol, of the politician Lucien-Anatole Prévost-Paradol.
