= Le Roi et le batelier =

1827 opera

- Opéra comique by Fromental Halévy
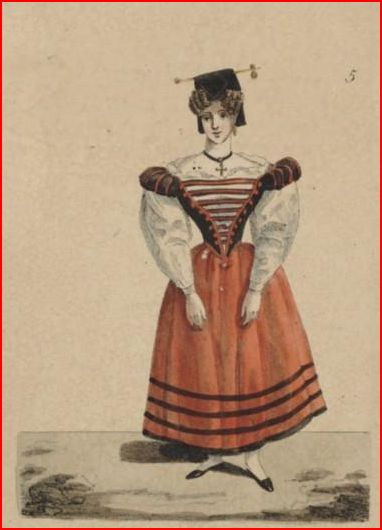
- Félicité Pradher as Georgette
- Translation: The King and the oarsman
- Librettist: Jules-Henri Vernoy de Saint-Georges
- Language: French
- Premiere: 8 November 1827; Opéra Comique, Paris

Le Roi et le batelier (The King and the oarsman) is a one-act opéra comique by Fromental Halévy and Victor Rifaut, to a libretto by Saint-Georges. It was first performed on 8 November 1827 at the Opéra Comique in Paris.

== Background ==
Le Roi et le batelier was the second of Halévy's operatic works to receive public performance. The music was written in collaboration with Victor Rifaut, who had won the Prix de Rome in 1821, two years after Halévy himself. The premiere took place on the birthday of King Charles X, and some flattering comparison of the King to the opera's hero Henri IV was obviously intended. The opera had thirteen performances, and has apparently never been revived.

A review of the original production in the English music journal The Harmonicon noted that the opera:

can boast of a number of pieces of interest, particularly the introduction, a quartet, a trio, a chorus of prisoners, and a delightful duet, excellently given by Ferréol and Mademoiselle Pradher.

== Roles ==
Role	Voice type	Premiere cast, 3 November 1827 (Conductor: - )
Henri IV		Louis-Augustin Lemonnier
Duc de Bellegarde	tenor	Lefeuillade
Claude, a boatman		Jules Vizentini
André, a soldier, engaged to Georgette		Louis Second Féréol
Gabrielle, Claude's wife		Juliette Boulanger
Georgette, Gabrielle's sister		Félicité Pradher
Chorus: Prisoners, soldiers, peasants		

== Synopsis ==
Time: 1594:
Place: Paris.

Henri IV seeks to capture Paris without resort to battle. In disguise as a Parisian soldier, he gets the oarsman Claude to ferry him across the river Seine. Pretending to smuggle supplies into the besieged city, the 'soldier' leads a convoy which in fact contains his army; Paris is thus taken peacefully and the citizens rejoice at the success of the King.
