= Clari =

1828 opera

- Opera semiseria by Fromental Halévy
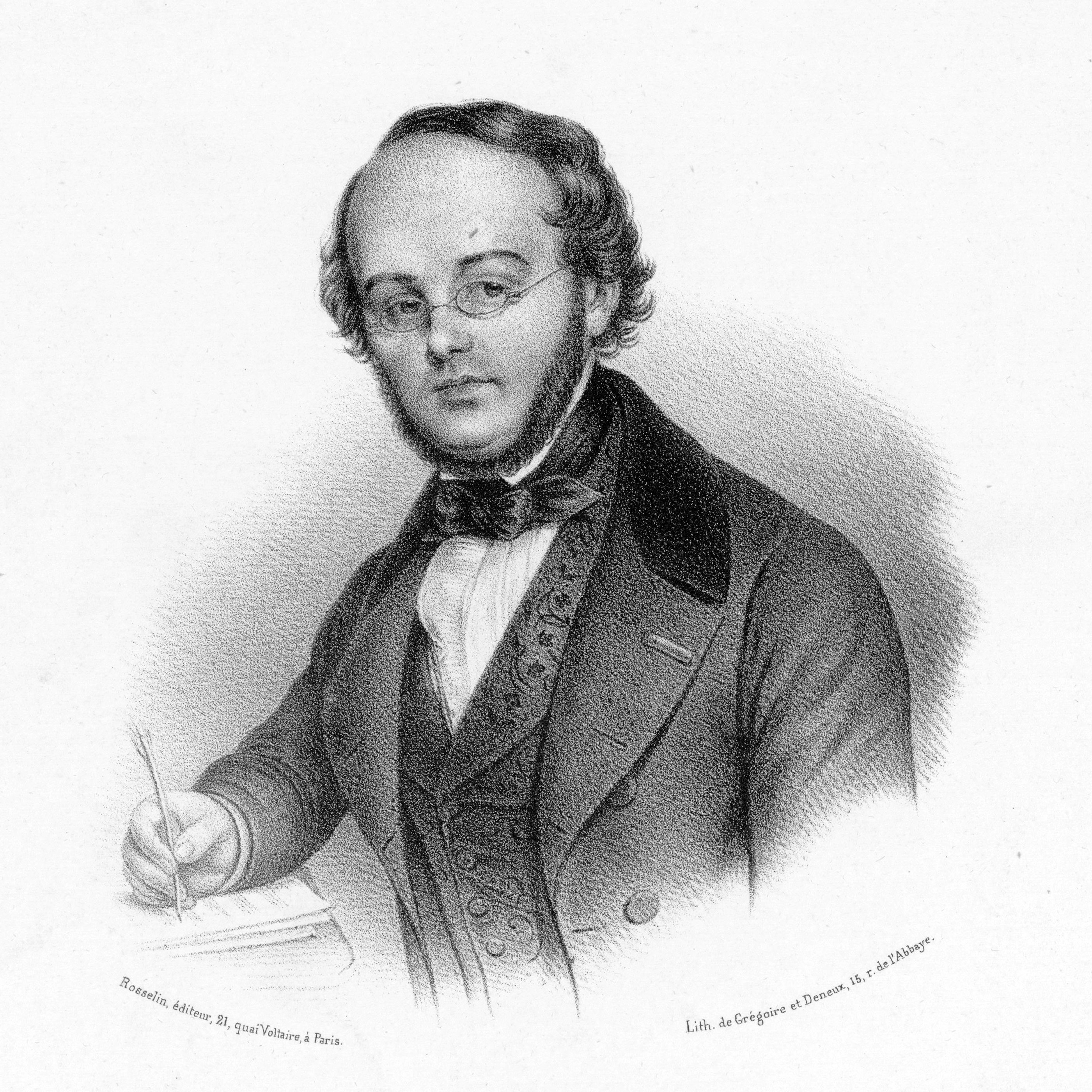
- The composer in 1825
- Librettist: Léon Halévy
- Language: Italian
- Premiere: 19 December 1828; Théâtre-Italien, Paris

Clari is an opera semiseria in three acts by Fromental Halévy, to an Italian libretto by Pietro Giannone. It was first produced at the Théâtre-Italien in Paris on 19 December 1828.

Clari was based on a popular novella, the storyline of which had already been set as an opera by Henry Bishop in London in 1823 (Clari, or the Maid of Milan – it included what came to be Bishop's most famous song, Home! Sweet Home!). There had also been a production of the story as Clari ou la promesse de mariage as a 'ballet-pantomime' in three acts at the Paris Opéra in 1820, with music by Rodolphe Kreutzer and designs by Cicéri and Louis Daguerre.

== Composition history ==
Halévy was chef de chant (vocal coach) at the Théâtre-Italien when he wrote the opera, his first in the Italian language. Clari's entrance aria in Act I, Come dolce a me favelli, had been in fact written by him in Italy some five or six years earlier as a fulfilment of his requirements when he had won the Prix de Rome.

Although Halévy was able to secure Maria Malibran for the title role, the work failed to please the public and was taken off after six performances. Fromental's brother, Ludovic, in his biography of the composer, however refers to Malibran's performance as 'so moving and dramatic'. A few further performances were given, of a revised version, in 1830.

== Performance history ==
The opera was not revived for nearly 180 years when Cecilia Bartoli took the role of Clari in a production given by the Opernhaus Zürich in 2008 in celebration of the centenary of Malibran's birth.

== Roles ==
Role	Voice type	Premiere Cast, 19 December 1828 (Conductor: - )
Clari	soprano	Maria Malibran
Il Duca (The Duke)	tenor	Domenico Donzelli
Bettina a housemaid		
Germano, servant of the Duke	bass	Carlo Zucchelli
Luca, a servant		
Alberto, Clari's father		
Simonetta, Clari's mother		
Servants, country folk, guests of the Duke

== Synopsis ==
The ingenuous country-girl Clari attracts the Duke, who installs her in his mansion as his 'cousin'. His intentions however appear to be far from marriage. Realising this, Clari, escapes back to her home, where her father berates her for shaming the family. The Duke however, realising that he truly loves her, pursues her, and all ends happily.
