= Asaph =

Asaph (Hebrew: אָסַף) is an ancient name that means "God has gathered" and may refer to:

- Asaph (biblical figure), the name of several Biblical figures
  - Psalms of Asaph
- Asaph the Jew, 6th-century Jewish physician, author of:
  - Book of Asaph
- Saint Asaph, first bishop of the diocese of Saint Asaph in Wales
  - Diocese of St Asaph
  - St Asaph, a city in North Wales
- Asaph (album)
- Asaph Hall, 19th century astronomer
- Asaph Hall Jr., son of the above
- Asaph Fipke, Canadian animator
