= Robert K. Webb =

American historian

Robert Kiefer Webb (November 23, 1922 – February 15, 2012) was an American historian.

Webb was educated at Oberlin College, taking his AB summa cum laude in 1947. He served in the United States Army Artillery during World War II, rising to master sergeant. In 1951, he received a PhD from Columbia University. In his historical works, Webb focused on Britain's avoidance of revolution during the late eighteenth and nineteenth centuries, as well as religious dissent.

In 1965, he translated Élie Halévy's Era of Tyrannies: Essays on Socialism and War into English. In 1992, he was honored with a festschrift, Religion and Irreligion in Victorian Society: Essays in Honor of R. K. Webb edited by R.W. Davis and R.J. Helmstadter.

In 1995, he was elected an Honorary Fellow of the Australian Academy of the Humanities as "the leading ally of Australian historians and the main proponent of Australian historical scholarship in the United States and, indeed, in Great Britain. His authority, integrity, great personal charm and wide acquaintance make him a powerful advocate for Australia in American and British scholarly circles."

Webb was survived by his wife Patty Webb, their daughters Emily Martin and Margaret Pressler, and six grandchildren.

== Works ==
- The British Working Class Reader, 1790–1848: Literacy and Social Tension (1955).
- Harriet Martineau: A Radical Victorian (1960).
- Halévy, Élie (1965). The Era of Tyrannies. Essays on Socialism and War. Translated by Robert K. Webb. With a note by Fritz Stern. New York and London: Doubleday and Allen Lane – via Internet Archive.
- Modern England (1968).
- (with Peter Gay), Modern Europe since 1815 (1980).
