= Pier Angelo Fiorentino =

Italian playwright, journalist and poet (1811–1864)

Pier Angelo Fiorentino (Naples, March 5, 1811 – Paris, May 31, 1864) was an Italian writer.

== Biography ==
He early published novels, poems, and dramas, including La Fornarina and Il medico di Parma. Alexandre Dumas père, while at Naples in 1835, induced him to settle in Paris, and to aid Dumas in the preparation of works relating to Italian life, some of which, especially Jeanne de Naples, were regarded as the exclusive production of Fiorentino. Fiorentino wrote French with the same facility and elegance as Italian. He went to Paris with 150 francs, and left 600,000 francs, acquired by literary labors.
