= Max Seligsohn =

Russian-born American Orientalist

Max Seligsohn (April 13, 1865 – April 11, 1923 Manhattan) was an American Orientalist, born in Imperial Russia.

Having received his rabbinical training at Slutsk, government (guberniya) of Minsk, he went in 1888 to New York City, where he studied modern languages till 1894, in which year he went to Paris to study Oriental languages, especially Semitic studies ("élève diplômé" of the École des Langues Orientales, 1897, and of the École des Hautes Études, 1900). In 1898 he was sent by the Alliance Israélite Universelle to Abyssinia to inquire into the conditions of the Falashas; but, certain difficulties arising, he was able to proceed no farther than Cairo, where he taught for eighteen months. Returning to Paris, he was invited in 1902 to go to New York to become a member of the staff of office editors of The Jewish Encyclopedia.

== Literary works ==
- "Le Diwan de Ṭarafah ibn al-'Abd" (Paris, 1900), a translation from the Arabic into French, with notes and an introduction; a French translation of "Kitab al-Raml," an Arabic work on geomancy, with preface and notes
- (with E. N. Adler) "Une Nouvelle Chronique Samaritaine," Paris, 1903
- (as contributor) "Jewish Quarterly Review" and the "Revue des Etudes Juives", mostly on Judæo-Persian literature
