= L'artisan =

Opéra comique by Fromental Halévy

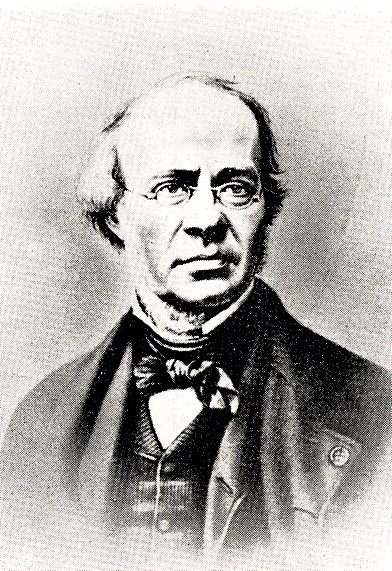
Halevy

L'artisan (The Craftsman) is an opéra comique by Fromental Halévy, to a libretto by Jules-Henri Vernoy de Saint-Georges.

L'artisan was the first of Halévy's operas to be staged (Opéra-Comique, Paris, 1827). The trivial plot is set in a shipyard in Antibes. The opera was withdrawn after 14 performances and seems never to have been revived.
