= David haLevi =

David haLevi or David Halevi may refer to:

- David HaLevi Segal
- Hayim David HaLevi
- David Halevi (born 1941) Israeli journalist and military commander
