= Madeleine Nottes =

Austrian opera and chamber prima donna

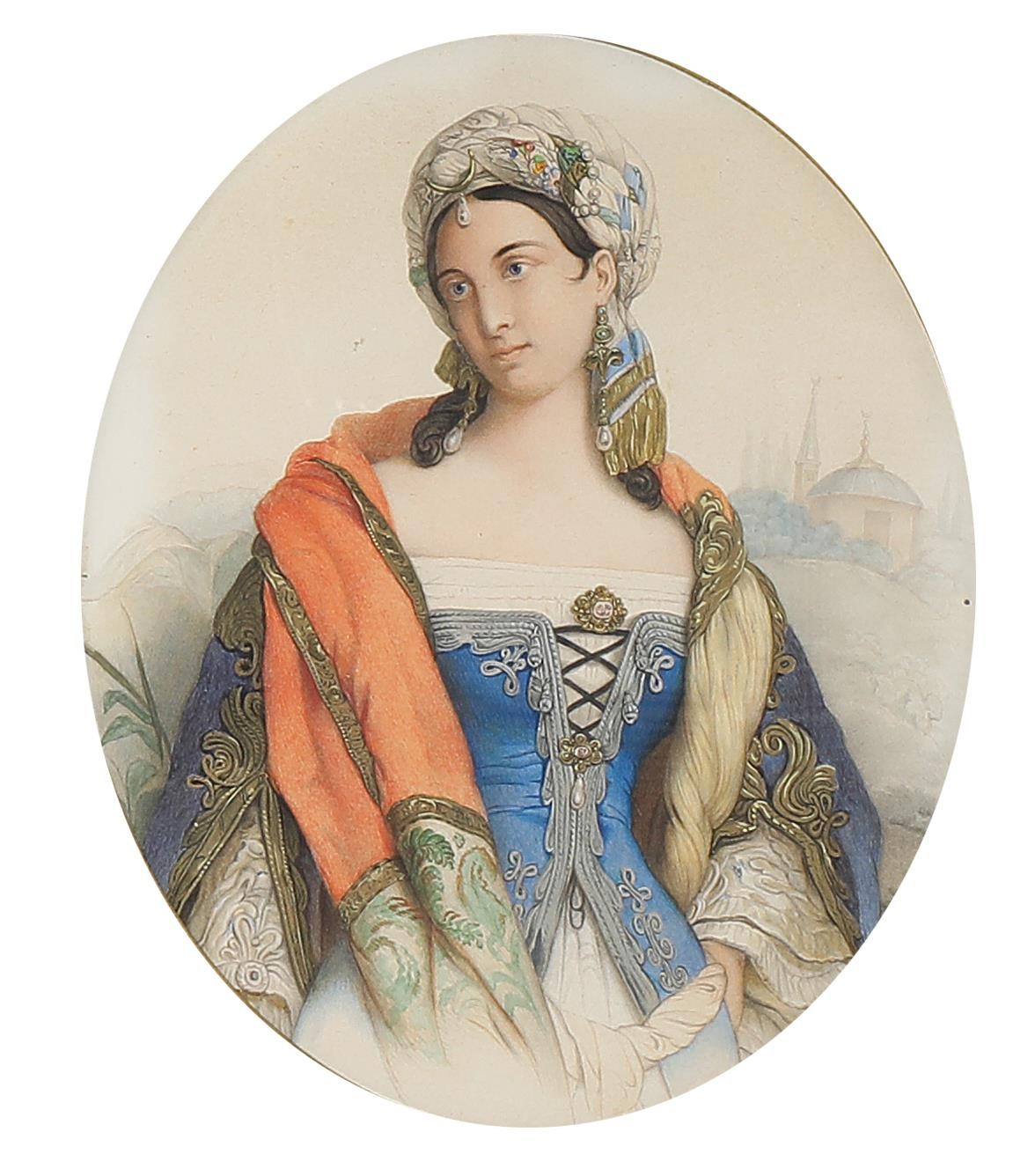
M. Nottes as Rachel in the opera La Juive ("The Jewess"), 1848

Madeleine Nottes, born Magdalene Nottes, also Magdalene Kratochwill (April 4, 1823 – May 5, 1861) was an Austrian opera and chamber prima donna.
