= Asaph (album) =

Studio album by Loud Harp
- Released: April 8, 2014
- Genre: Worship
- Length: 52:59

Asaph is the second studio album from Loud Harp. They released the album on April 8, 2014.

== Critical reception ==
Professional ratings
Review scores
| Source | Rating |
|---|---|
| Indie Vision Music | 5/5 stars |
| Worship Leader | 4.5/5 stars |

Awarding the album four and a half stars from Worship Leader, Jeremy Armstrong states, "Asaph is the freshest sound in the worship landscape." Jessica Cooper, giving the album five stars at Indie Vision Music, writes, "It’s loaded with good vibes, good sounds, good lyrics, and good…ness. It's just good." Reviewing the album for Ruminate Magazine, Chris Hess describes, "Landscapes and textures of focused, swaying, creative, joyful composition." Alex Gilvarry, indicating in a review by Slug Magazine, says, "Loud Harp comes as a breath of fresh air...The message here might be lost on some, but the power and feeling behind the delivery is enough to make anyone emotional."

== Awards and accolades ==
The album was No. 1 on the Worship Leader's Top 5 Community Funded and Indie Releases of 2014 list.

The song, "Nearness of You", was No. 10 on the Worship Leader's Top 20 Songs of 2014 list.

== Track listing ==
| No. | Title | Length |
|---|---|---|
| 1. | "(27) Take Heart" | 5:20 |
| 2. | "(08) I’m Yours" | 5:22 |
| 3. | "(73) The Nearness of You" | 5:42 |
| 4. | "(77) You Heard Me" | 5:40 |
| 5. | "(121) Ascent" | 3:29 |
| 6. | "(121) I Lift My Eyes" | 3:47 |
| 7. | "(73) My Portion Forever" | 2:06 |
| 8. | "(50) Out of Zion" | 5:20 |
| 9. | "(50) The Fire and the Flood" | 5:22 |
| 10. | "(05) Beautiful Son" | 4:16 |
| 11. | "(144) Steadfast Love" | 6:35 |
| Total length: | | 52:59 |

== Chart performance ==
| Chart (2014) | Peak position |
|---|---|
| US Heatseekers Albums (Billboard) | 44 |
