= Louis-Hippolyte Lebas =

French architect

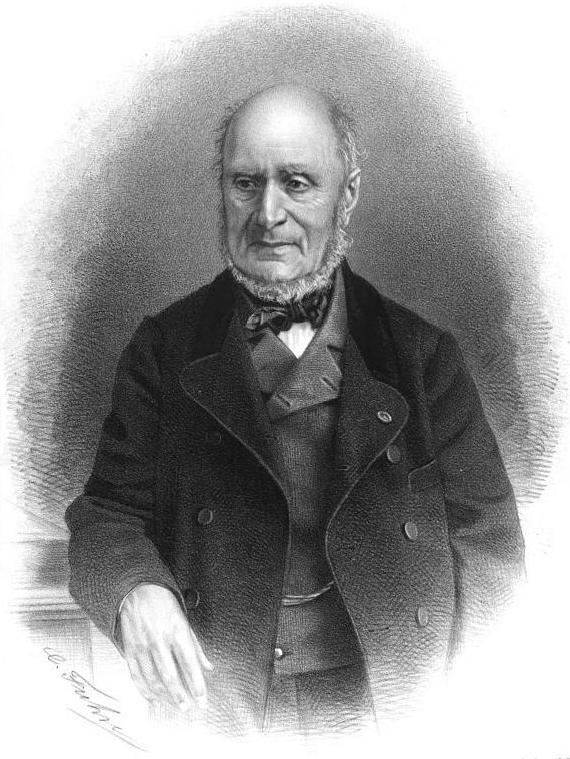
Louis-Hippolyte Lebas (c.1865)

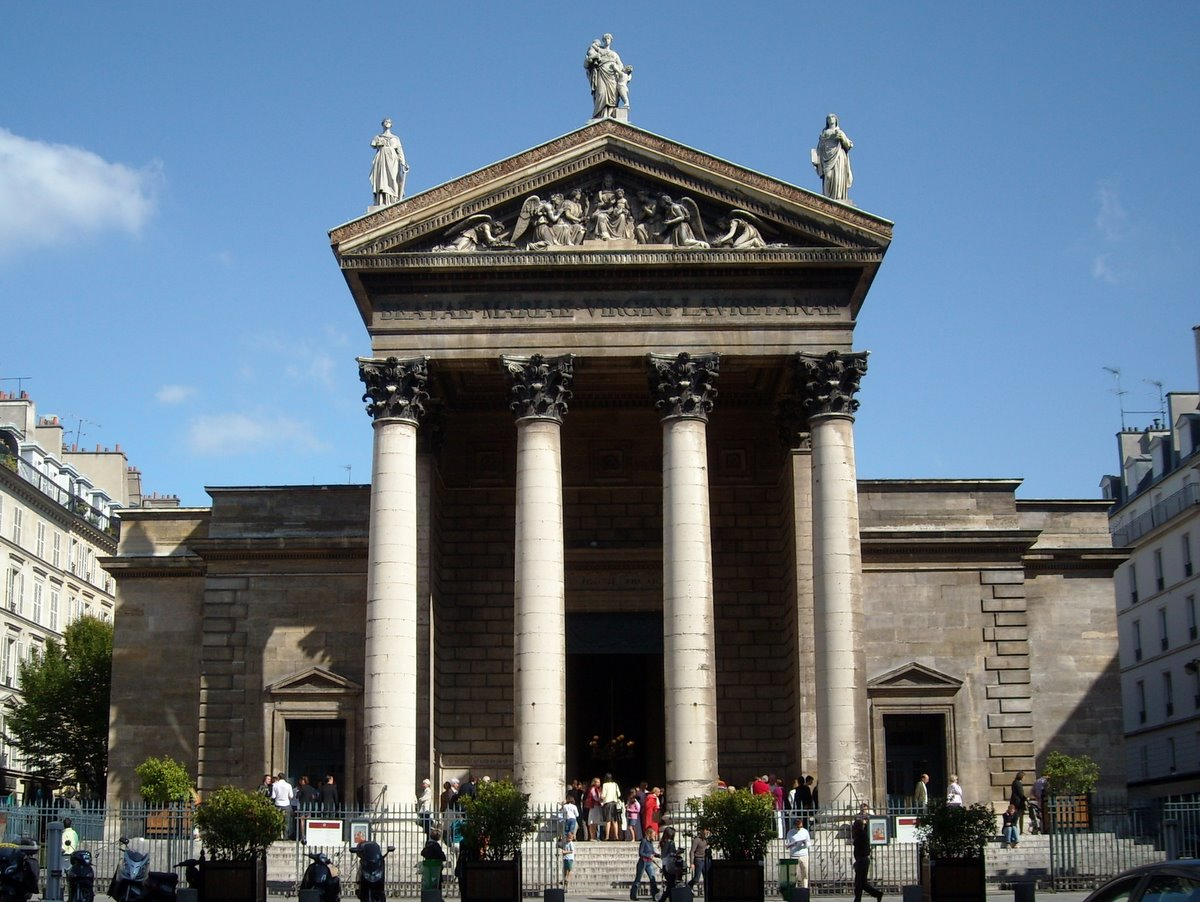
Church Notre-Dame-de-Lorette, Paris

Louis-Hippolyte Lebas (31 March 1782 in Paris – 12 June 1867 in Paris) was a French architect working in a rational and severe Neoclassical style.

== Life and career ==
He was trained in the atelier of Percier and Fontaine, the favoured architects of Napoleon. After Napoleon's exile he remained the assistant of Pierre François Léonard Fontaine, whose design for the sober Chapelle Expiatoire over the burial site of Louis XVI and Marie Antoinette he oversaw in construction (1816-1824). He also assisted Éloi Labarre (1764—1833) in completing the Palais Brongniart (1813-1826), the seat of the Paris Bourse, named after its architect, Alexandre Brongniart.

One of his best known works is the Parisian church Notre-Dame-de-Lorette for which he was commissioned in 1823 and that completed in 1836. He built the former prison of Petite Roquette, (1826-1836, demolished 1974), which was the first example in France of a progressive panoptic prison.

Lebas taught the History of Architecture at the École des Beaux-Arts, from 1840 to 1863. In this teaching role, applying the art-historical method of Johann Joachim Winckelmann to the study of historical architecture, he set a mark on several generations of young French architects.

His daughter married the historian and civil servant Léon Halévy.
