= Élie Halévy (Chalfan) =

French-Jewish author

Élie Halévy (né Ḥalfan/Chalfan), or Élie Halfon-Halévy (Fürth 1760 – Paris 5 November 1826), was a French-Jewish author who composed his works, most notably his poetry, in Hebrew. He is the father of Fromental and Léon Halévy.

== Life and work ==
Born at Fürth (in present-day Bavaria), at an early age Halévy went to Paris, where he became cantor and secretary to the Jewish Consistoire of Paris. His knowledge of the Talmud and his poetical talent earned him the esteem of many French scholars, particularly the well-known Orientalist Sylvestre de Sacy. His first poem was "Ha-Shalom", a hymn composed on the occasion of the treaty of Amiens; it was sung in the synagogue of Paris, in both Hebrew and French, on the 17th Brumaire (8 November) 1801. The poem was praised in Latin verses by Protestant pastor Marron.

In 1808, Halévy composed a prayer to be recited on the anniversary of the battle of Wagram; in 1817, with the help of some of his co-religionists, he founded the French weekly L'Israélite Français, which, however, expired within two years. To this periodical he contributed a remarkable dialogue entitled "Socrate et Spinosa" (ii.73). His Limmude Dat u-Musar (Metz, 1820) is a text-book of religious instruction compiled from the Bible, with notes, a French translation, and the decisions of the Sanhedrin instituted by Napoleon. Halévy left two unpublished works, a Hebrew-French dictionary and an essay on Æsop's fables. He attributes the fables to Solomon (comp. I Kings v. 12-13 [A. V. iv.32-33]), and thinks the name "Æsop" to be a form of "Asaph".

== Bibliography ==
- , By Isidore Singer, M. Seligsohn
  - Allgemeine Zeitung des Judentums 1839, Beiblatt No. 1;
  - Léon Halévy, in Univ. Isr. xviii. 274-276;
  - Heinrich Grätz, Gesch. 2d ed., xi. 217-218;
  - William Zeitlin, Bibl. Post-Mendels. pp. 133–134
