= Léon Halévy =

French civil servant, historian and dramatist

- Born: 4 January 1802; Paris, France
- Died: 2 September 1883 (aged 81); Saint-Germain-en-Laye, France
- Occupations: Historian, dramatist
- Spouse: Alexandrine Lebas
- Children: Ludovic Halévy; Lucien-Anatole Prévost-Paradol
- Parent: Élie Halévy
- Relatives: Jacques François Fromenthal Halévy (brother); Louis-Hippolyte Lebas (father-in-law); Élie Halévy (grandson); Daniel Halévy (grandson)

Léon Halévy (4 January 1802 – 2 September 1883) was a French civil servant, historian, and dramatist.

== Early life ==
Born to a Jewish family in Paris, Léon was the son of the writer and chazzan Élie Halévy and the younger brother of the composer Jacques François Fromenthal Halévy. He was educated at the Lycée Charlemagne.

== Career ==
Halévy became a disciple and collaborator of Saint-Simon, aiding in the foundation of his journal, Le Producteur, and writing the introduction to his work, Opinions Littéraires, Philosophiques et Industrielles, in which Olinde Rodrigues and Étienne-Martin Bailly also assisted. In 1828 he wrote a Résumé de l'histoire des Juifs modernes ("A Summary of Modern Jewish History"), one of the earliest works on this topic.

In 1831, Halévy became an assistant professor of French literature at the Ecole Polytechnique, where there was some discrimination against Jews. However he abandoned the position three years later.

In 1837, Halévy was attached to the Ministry of Public Instruction as chief of the bureau of scientific societies, and remained there until his retirement in 1853, after which he devoted the remainder of his life to literature, writing a large number of poems, translations, plays, and other works. Few of these are read today, although he was well regarded in his time. Amongst them was a biography of his brother Fromental, published after the latter's death in 1864.

== Personal life and death ==
Halévy became baptised in order to marry the daughter of the architect Louis-Hippolyte Lebas. Their son Ludovic Halévy was one of the leading librettists of mid-century France. Ludovic's own children, Élie Halévy and Daniel Halévy, were noted academics.

Another son, sired by Léon's liaison with an opera singer, was the politician Lucien-Anatole Prévost-Paradol.

Léon Halévy died, aged 81, at Saint Germain-en-Laye.

== Bibliography ==
- La Grande Encyclopédie
- Larousse, Dict.

== Sources ==
- Profile, jewishencyclopedia.com. Accessed 15 February 2024.
