= List of compositions by Georges Bizet =

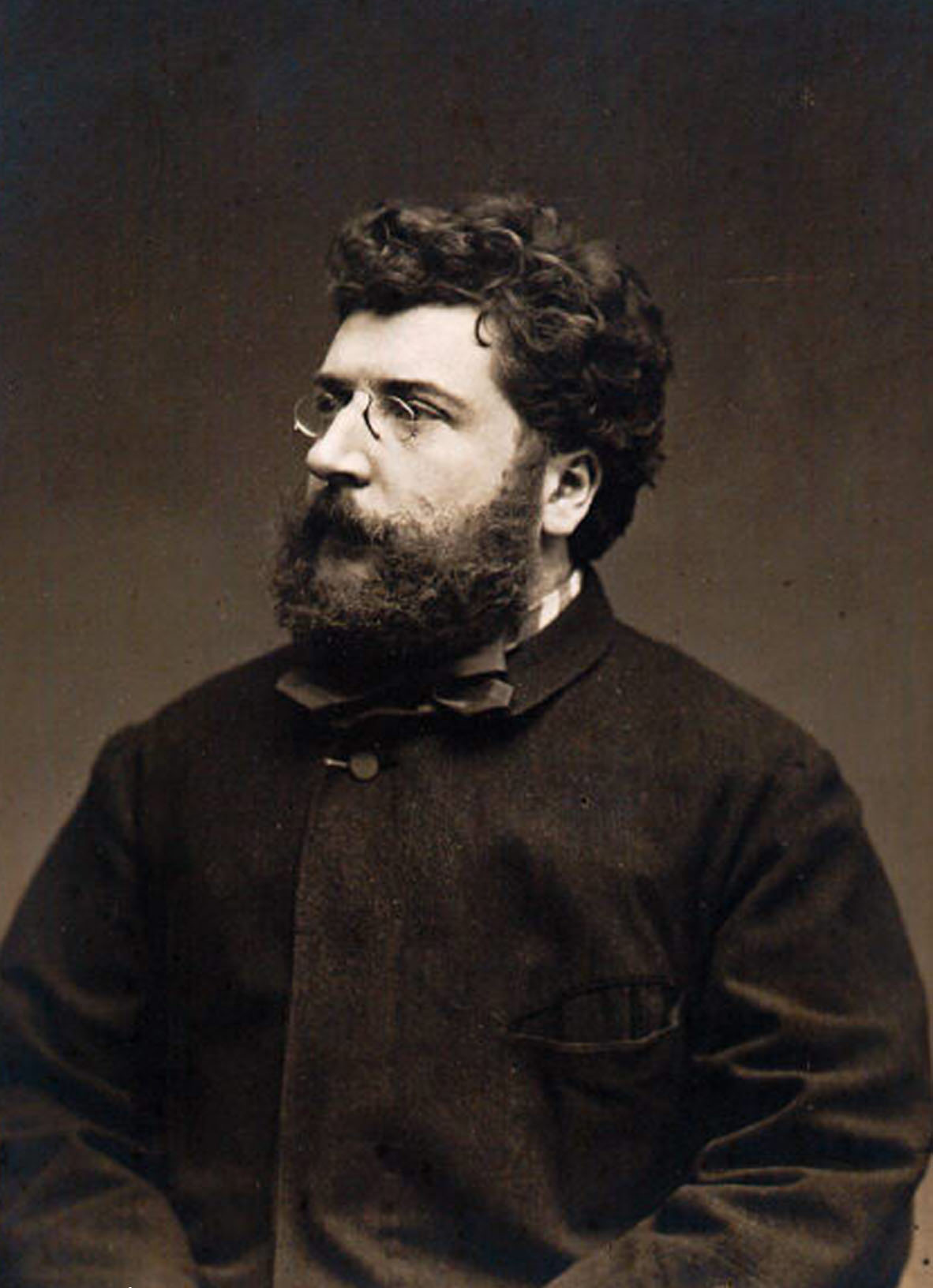
Georges Bizet in 1875

This is a list of compositions by Georges Bizet (1838–75).

== List of works ==
=== Stage works ===
Operas:

- La maison du docteur (The Physician's House), opéra comique, 1 act, (H. Boisseaux; composed either in 1852 or 1855; unperformed)
- Le docteur Miracle (Doctor Miracle, opérette, 1 act, (L. Battu & L. Halévy, after R.B. Sheridan; composed 1856; first performance: Paris, Bouffes-Parisiens, 9 April 1857)
- Don Procopio, opéra bouffe, 2 acts, (C. Cambiaggio, after L. Prividali; composed 1858–59; first performance: Monte Carlo, 10 March 1906)
- La prêtresse (The Priestess), opérette, 1 act, (P. Gille; composed ca. 1861; unperformed)
- La guzla de l'émir (The Guzla of the Amir), opéra comique, (J. Barbier & M. Carré; composed ca. 1862; unperformed)
- Ivan IV, opéra, 5 acts, (F.-H. Leroy & H. Trianon; composed ca. 1862–65; first performance: Württemberg, Mühringen Castle, 1946)
- Les pêcheurs de perles (The Pearl Fishers), opéra, 3 acts, (E. Cormon & M. Carré; composed 1863; first performance: Paris, Théâtre Lyrique, 30 September 1863)
- La jolie fille de Perth (The Fair Maid of Perth), opéra, 4 acts, (J.-H. Vernoy de Saint-Georges & J. Adenis, after W. Scott); composed 1866; first performance: Paris, Théâtre Lyrique, 26 December 1867)
- Marlbrough s'en va-t-en guerre (Marlbrough Goes to War), opérette, 4 acts, (P. Siraudin & W. Busnach; composed 1867, Act I only, lost; first performance: Paris, Théâtre de l'Athénée, 13 December 1867; the title was taken from the popular song "Marlbrough s'en va-t-en guerre")
- La coupe du roi de Thulé (The King of Thule's goblet), opéra, 3 acts, (L. Gallet & E. Blau; composed 1868–69, after his death the autograph full score was mutilated by various hands and only fragments remain; first performance: (excerpts) BBC Radio, 12 July 1955)
- Clarisse Harlowe, opéra comique, 3 acts, (Gille & A. Jaime, after S. Richardson; composed 1870–71, incomplete; unperformed)
- Grisélidis, opéra comique, 1 act, (V. Sardou; composed 1870–71, incomplete; unperformed)
- Djamileh, opéra comique, 1 act, (Gallet, after A. de Musset; composed 1871; first performance: Paris, Opéra-Comique (Favart), 22 May 1872)
- Don Rodrigue, opéra, 5 acts, (Gallet & Blau, after G. de Castro y Bellvis; composed 1872, incomplete draft; unperformed)
- Carmen, opéra comique, 4 acts, (H. Meilhac & L. Halévy, after P. Mérimée; composed 1873–74; first performance: Paris, Opéra-Comique (Favart), 3 March 1875)

Incidental music:

- L'Arlésienne (The Woman from Arles), incidental music, 3 acts (A. Daudet; composed 1872; first performance: Paris, Théâtre du Vaudeville, 1 October 1872)

=== Orchestral works ===
- Overture in A minor/A major (“Première Ouverture”), 1855
- Symphony in C major, 1855
- Fantaisie symphonique in C major (“Souvenirs de Rome”), 1868
- Ouverture dramatique “Patrie”, Op. 19, 1873
- Petite suite, orchestrations made by Bizet in 1872 of five movements from his Jeux d’enfants
- Scènes bohémiennes, an orchestral suite made by Bizet in 1874 from his opera La jolie fille de Perth
- Suite No. 1 from the above-listed incidental music for Daudet’s L’Arlésienne, compiled in 1872 by Bizet himself
- Suite No. 2 from L’Arlésienne, compiled by Guiraud in 1879 after Bizet’s death
- The two suites of music from Carmen were arranged by Ernest Guiraud, No. 1 in 1882 : Prélude—Aragonaise (Act IV Entr’acte)—Intermezzo (Act III Entr’acte)—Séguedille—Les dragons d’Alcalá (Act II Entr’acte)—Les toréadors, and No. 2 in 1887: Marche des contrebandiers—Habanera—Nocturne (Act III Air de Micaëla)—Chanson du toréador (Act II)—La garde montante (Act I)—Danse bohème

=== Works for chorus and orchestra ===
- Clovis et Clotilde (cantata), 1857
- Te Deum, 1858
- Ode Symphony Vasco de Gama (words by Louis Delâtre), 1859–60

=== Songs ===
(words by / year composed)

- L'âme triste est pareille au doux ciel (Lamartine)
- Petite Marguerite (Olivier Rolland, 1854)
- La rose et l'abeille (Rolland, 1854)
- La foi, l'esperance et la charité (de Lagrave, 1854))
- Vieille chanson (Millevoye, 1865)
- Adieux de l'hôtesse arabe (Hugo, 1866)
- Apres l'hiver (Hugo, 1866)
- Douce mer (Lamartine, 1866)
- Chanson d'avril (Bouilhet, 1866)
- Feuilles d'album (1866): "À une fleur" (de Musset), "Adieux à Suzon" (de Musset), "Sonnet" (Ronsard), "Guitare" (Hugo), "Rose d'amour" (Millevoye), "Le grillon" (Lamartine)
- Pastorale (Regnard, 1868)
- Rêve de la bien-aimée (de Courmont, 1868; dedicated to Léontine de Maësen)
- Ma vie a son secret (Arvers, 1868)
- Berceuse (Desbordes-Valmore, 1868)
- La chanson du fou (Hugo, 1868)
- La coccinelle (Hugo, 1868)
- La sirène (Mendès, 1868)
- Le doute (Ferrier, 1868)
- L'esprit saint
- Absence (Gautier)
- Chant d'amour (Lamartine)
- Tarentelle (Pailleron)
- Vous ne priez pas (Casamir Delavigne)
- Le colibri (Flan, 1868)
- Sérénade 'Oh, quand je dors' (Hugo)
- Vœu (Hugo, 1868)
- Voyage, Aubade, La nuit, Conte, Aimons, rêvons!, La chanson de la rose, Le Gascon, N'oublions pas!, Si vous aimez!, Pastel, l'abandonnée (these songs are from unidentified unfinished dramatic works)

=== Works for piano ===
- Nocturne in F major
- Variations chromatiques de concert (Chromatic Variations in Concert; orchestrated by Felix Weingartner in 1933)
- Caprice in C♯ minor
- Caprice in C major
- Chasse fantastique (The Fantastic Hunt)
- Romance sans paroles (Romance Without Words) in C major
- Thème brilliant in C
- Valse in C major
- Trois esquisses musicales (Three Musical Sketches)
- Grande valse de concert in E♭
- Marine
- Nocturne in D major
- Impromptu in E♭ major (Ends in E♭ minor)
- Moment Musicaux in F minor (Ends in F major)
- Chants du Rhin (Songs of the Rhine)
- Four préludes
- Chansons-Mélodies Romances sans Paroles: Chanson d'Avril, Extase, Méditation : Souvenir de l'Arlésienne
- Venise : Romance sans Paroles
- Jeux d'enfants (Children's Games) 12 pieces for piano duet
1. L'escarpolette (The Swing, Rêverie)
2. La toupie (The Top, Impromptu)
3. La poupée (The Doll, Berceuse)
4. Les chevaux de bois (The Hobby-horses, Scherzo)
5. Le volant (Battledore and Shuttlecock, Fantasy)
6. Trompette et tambour (Trumpet and Drum, March)
7. Les bulles de savon (Soap Bubbles, Rondo)
8. Les quatre coins (Puss in the Corner, Esquisse)
9. Colin-maillard (Blind Man's Bluff, Nocturne)
10. Saute-mouton (Leap-frog, Caprice)
11. Petit mari, petite femme (Little Husband, little wife, Duo)
12. Le bal (The Ball, Gallop)

=== Transcriptions ===
- Version for solo piano of Saint-Saëns' Piano Concerto No. 2
- Version for solo piano of the opera “Don Giovanni” by Mozart

=== Completions of others' works ===
- Fromental Halévy – Noé, opéra, 3 acts (Saint-Georges; composed 1858–62 and left unfinished at Halévy's death; completed by Bizet; first performance Karlsruhe, 5 April 1885)
