= André Heyboer =

French opera singer

André Heyboer (born in 1971 in Brive-la-Gaillarde) is a French contemporary baritone.

In 1992, he entered the Conservatoire de Toulouse. In 2005, he began a career as a baritone. Today, he performs in works from the 19th century French and Italian repertoire (Verdi, Puccini, Bizet, Massenet) without neglecting contemporary creation (La Métamorphose by Michaël Levinas).

== Biography ==
Heyboer began his musical apprenticeship at the age of eleven when he began practicing singing in the choirs of Terrasson-Lavilledieu and the Camerata Vocal of Brive. He sang Renaissance, French, Italian and German Baroque repertoires in the festivals of la Vézère, La Chaise-Dieu and the Sylvanès Abbey. He studied classical guitar for eight years.

He moved from choral singing to the roles of soloist, and developed his technique through private teaching. He met artists such as José van Dam. He followed the master classes of the "Master of Music" and took part in several concerts alongside him. At the Capitole de Toulouse he was a soloist in Charpentier's Louise (direction by Nicolas Joel, conductor Michel Plasson).

He played Pristav in Boris Godunov, Noah in Britten's Noye's Fludde and a Flemish Member of Parliament in Don Carlos.

From 2006 to 2010, he sang with some noted interpreters (Neil Schicoff, Roberto Scianduzzi, Violeta Urmana, Dennis O Neill, Annick Massis, Natalie Dessay, Sophie Koch, Ludovic Tezier). At the Capitole de Toulouse he sang Wagner in Faust, Jahel in Le roi d'Ys and Roucher in Giordano's Andrea Chenier.

At the Paris Opera he sang Rugierro in Fromental Halévy's La Juive (2007) and De Bretigny in Manon (2012).

In 2009 he sang on the land of his Dutch ancestors at the Amsterdam Opera House, performing La Juive. He sang Melot in Tristan und Isolde at the same time as he took on the role of Kurwenal at the Forum de Montpellier.

In Dijon, he played Macbeth (2008), Enrico in Lucia di Lammermoor (2009), Valentin in Gounod's Faust (2007).

He took part in the premiere of Michaël Levinas's La Métamorphose at the Opéra de Lille, a production which won the "Grand Prix of the Academie Charles Cros" in 2012 and the "Prix de l'Académie lyrique du disque".

In 2012 he played Zurga at the Opéra comique in Bizet's Les Pêcheurs de Perles with Sonya Yoncheva and Dmitri Korshak and Nicolas Testé. At the end of that same year, he took part in the recording CD of Catel's Les bayadères, and (Olkar) in Sofia at the Centre de musique romantique française.

In 2013, he was Padre Camoine in Mascagni's Amica at the Opéra de Monte-Carlo. In April of the same year, he sang, accompanied by Éloïse Urbain, an opera recital as part of the "Great Performers" season of the Sinfonia festival in Périgord.

For the 2013–2014 season, he took the role of Nilakhanta in Lakméat the Opéra-théâtre de Saint-Étienne. At the Paris Opéra, Sonora in La fanciulla del West at Bastille, and finally Alfio at the Capitole de Toulouse in Cavalleria Rusticana. He took part in Tosca in the Dutch National Opera.

In the 2017–2018 season, he sang the cycle of the Winterreise accompanied by Éloïse Urbain in the season of the great interpreters of Sinfonia in Périgueux.

At the opera, he was Sharpless in Madame Butterfly at the Opéra de Limoges, Count Ludorf in Gounod's La Nonne sanglante at the Opéra Comique, Germont in La Traviata at the Capitole de Toulouse, and finally the Great Priest in Samson and Delilah at the Opéra de Monte-Carlo.

== Roles ==
=== 2021 ===
Edison: Philippe Hersant's Les Éclairs, Opéra-Comique, Paris.

=== 2018 ===
Paolo Albiani: Gounod's La Nonne sanglante, Opéra Comique, conductor: Laurence Equilbey

Sharpless: Puccini's Madame Butterfly, Opéra de Limoges, conductor: Robert Tuohy

=== 2017 ===
Paolo Albiani: Verdi's Simon Boccanegra, Opéra de Monte-Carlo, conductor: Pinchas Steinberg

Paolo Albiani: Verdi's Simon Boccanegra Théâtre des Champs-Élysées, conductor: Pinchas Steinberg

Trivia: Viva Verdi, Théâtre des Champs-Élysées, conductor: Giampaolo Bisanti

=== 2016 ===
- Great priest of Dagon: Camille Saint-Saëns's Samson et Dalila, Palau de les Arts Reina Sofia, conductor: Roberto Abbado
- Nabucco: Verdi's Nabucco, Opéra-théâtre de Saint-Étienne, conductor: David Reiland.
- Sciarrone: Puccini's La Tosca, Opéra Bastille, conductor: Dan Ettinger

=== 2015 ===
- Baritone: Chausson's Poème de l'amour et de la mer, Rouen Opera House, conductor: Leo Hussain
- Baritone: Berlioz's Lélio, Palau de les Arts Reina Sofia with Mario Zeffiri, Nacho Fresneda, conductor: Roberto Abbado
- Athanaël: Massenet's Thaïs, Theatro Municipal (São Paulo) with Ermonela Jaho, Sara Rossi Daldoss, Lado Ataneli, conductor: Alain Guingal
- Paolo Albiani: Verdi's Simon Boccanegra with Dario Solari, Celia Costea, and Hector Sandoval, Opéra de Toulon, conductor: Giuliano Carella
- Le Viconte de Fontrailles: Gounod's Cinq Mars with Charles Castronovo, Véronique Gens and Melody Louledjian, Royal Opera of Versailles, conductor: Ulf Schirmer

=== 2014 ===
- Sciarrone: Puccini's La Tosca with Martina Serafin, Béatrice Uria-Monzon, Ludovic Tézier, Marco Berti, Opéra Bastille, conductor: Daniel Oren, Evelino Pidò
- Alfio: Mascagni's Cavalleria rusticana with Elena Bocherova, Nicolaï Schukoff, Sarah Jouffroy, Elena Zilio, Théâtre du Capitole de Toulouse, conductor: Tugan Sokhiev
- Sonora: Puccini's La fanciulla del West with Nina Stemme, Marco Berti and Claudio Sgura, Opéra de Paris, conductor Carlo Rizzi

=== 2013 ===
- Camoine: Amica by Pietro Mascagni with Amarilli Nizza, Enrique Ferrer, and Lucio Gallo, Opéra de Monte-Carlo, conductor Gianluigi Gelmetti
- Nilakantha: Delibes's Lakmé with Marie-Eve Munger, Cyrille Dubois, Opéra-théâtre de Saint-Étienne, conductor Laurent Campellone

=== 2012 ===
- The father: Michaël Levinas's La Métamorphose, with Magalie Leger, Simon Bailey, Opéra de Lille, conductor Georges-Elie Octors
- Zurga: Bizets Les Pêcheurs de Perles with Sonya Yoncheva, Dmitry Korchak and Nicolas Testé, Théâtre national de l'Opéra-Comique, conductor Léo Hussain
- De Brétigny: Jules Massenet's Manon, with Natalie Dessay, Giuseppe Filianoti, Jean François Borras, Marianne Fiset, Franck Ferrari, Paul Gay and Luca Lombardo, Opéra Bastille, conductor Evelino Pido
- Valentin: Gounod's Faust, Festival d'Avignon with Nathalie Manfrino, Florian Laconi and Nicolas Cavallier, conductor Dominique Trottein, and Opéra de Reims with Guylaine Girard, Sébastien Guèze and Nicolas Cavallier
- Olkar: Charles-Simon Catel's Les bayadères, (in concert in Sofia, Bulgaria) with Chantal Santon, Philippe Do, Mathias Vidal, Katia Velletaz, Kareen Durand, Elodie Méchain, Eric Martin-Bonnet, Frédéric Caton, conductor: Didier Talpain

=== 2011 ===
- Cristiano: Verdi's Un Ballo in Maschera with Violeta Urmana, Ludovic Tézier, Elisabetta Fiorillo, Opéra de Monte-Carlo, conductor Daniele Callegari
- Garrido: Massenet's La Navarraise with Marie Kalinine, Opéra-théâtre de Saint-Étienne, conductor Laurent Campellone
- Alfio : Mascagni's Cavalleria Rusticana with Marie Kalinine, Opéra-théâtre de Saint-Étienne, conductor Laurent Campellone

=== 2010 ===
- Roucher: Giordano's Andrea Chénier with Irène Cerboncini, Zoran Todorovich, Marco Di Felice, Opéra de Marseille, conductor Fabrizio Maria Carminati
- Lescaut: Massenet's Manon with Nathalie Manfrino and Florian Laconi, Marcel Vanaud, Opéra de Hong Kong, conductor Nicola Colabianchi

=== 2009 ===
- Roucher: Giordano's Andrea Chénier with Marcello Alvarez, Micaela Carosi and Sergei Murzaev, Opéra Bastille, conductor Daniel Oren
- Ruggiero: Halévy's La Juive with Dennis O'Neil, Annick Massis, Angeles Blancas Gulin, John Osborn and Alistair Miles, Opéra d'Amsterdam, conductor Pierre Audi
- Wagner: Gounod's Faust with Inva Mula, Giuseppe Filianoti and Orlin Anastasov, Théâtre du Capitole de Toulouse, conductor Emmanuel Plasson
- Enrico: Donizetti's Lucia di Lammermoor with Burcu Uyar, Andrea Giovannini and Jean Teitgen, Auditorium de Dijon, conductor Claude Schnitzler

=== 2008 ===
- Macbeth: Verdi's Macbeth, with Cécile Perrin and Jérôme Varnier (Auditorium de Dijon), conductor: Dominique Trottein
- Spendius: Ernest Reyer's Salammbô with Kate Aldrich, Gilles Ragon, Wojtek Smilek, Sebastien Guèze and Jean-Philippe Lafont, Opéra de Marseille, conductor Lawrence Foster

=== 2007 ===
- Rigoletto: Verdi's Rigoletto (with Philippe Do, Liliana Faraon, Sédières, conductor Jérôme Devaud
- Valentin: Gounod's Faust with Fiorella Buratto, Nicolas Cavallier, Jean Pierre Furlan, Auditorium de Dijon, conductor Claude Schnitzler
- Jahel: Édouard Lalo's Le Roi d’Ys with Paul Gay, Sophie Koch and Inva Mula, Franck Ferrari, Capitole de Toulouse, conductor Yves Abel

=== 2006 ===
The jailer, the 2nd commissioner: Poulenc's Le Dialogue des carmélites with Barbara Ducret, Manon Feubel, Marie-Ange Todorovitch, Gilles Ragon, Opéra de Marseille, conductor Patrick Davin

- Marullo: Verdi's Rigoletto with Giuseppe Gipali and Carlos Almaguer, Opéra de Marseille, conductor Paolo Arrivabeni
- Marco: Puccini's Gianni Schicchi with Juan Pons, Anne-Catherine Gillet and Ismaël Jordi, Capitole de Toulouse, conductor Marco Armiliato
- Le Mandarin: Puccini's Turandot with Cynthia Makris and Jean-François Borras, Opéra de Marseille, conductor Daniel Klajner

=== 2005 ===
- Noé: Benjamin Britten's Arche de Noé, Opéra de Marseille, conductor Christophe Larrieu
- Pristav: Modeste Mussorgski's Boris Godunov with Anatoli Kotcherga and Alexander Anisimov, Philip Langridge, Capitole de Toulouse, conductor Bernhard Kontarsky
- Un député flamand: Verdi's Don Carlos, with Ludovic Tézier, Fabio Armiliato, Daniela Dessì and Roberto Scandiuzzi, Capitole de Toulouse, conductor Maurizio Benini
- Melot: Wagner's Tristan und Isolde, Hedwig Fassbender and Corum (Montpellier), conductor Friedemann Layer
- Giorgio Germont: Verdi's La Traviata, with Svetlana Doneva, Marc Laho and Sebastien Guèze, Opéra de Marseille

== Discography ==
- Catel's Les bayadères, Ensemble Solamentene Naturali, direction Didier Talpain, éditions Singulares
- Michaël Levinas's La Métamorphose, Ensemble Ictus, direction Georges-Elie Octors, éditions Aeon
