= Les Huguenots discography =

The following is a list of recordings of the opera Les Huguenots, by Giacomo Meyerbeer (libretto by Eugène Scribe and Émile Deschamps), which was premiered in 1836. Performances are in the original French unless noted.

== Recordings ==
Year	Cast (Marguerite, Valentine, Urbain, Raoul, Marcel, Nevers, Saint-Bris)	Conductor, Opera house and orchestra	Label
1955	Valerie Bak, Maud Cunitz, Eta Köhrer, Karl Terkal, Gottlob Frick, Franz Fuchs, Walter Berry	Robert Heger; Chorus and Orchestra of Austrian Radio	Walhall Eternity Records; CD Cat:WLCD0169; Recording released 2015; Sung in German
1962	Joan Sutherland, Giulietta Simionato, Fiorenza Cossotto, Franco Corelli, Nicolai Ghiaurov, Wladimiro Ganzarolli, Giorgio Tozzi	Gianandrea Gavazzeni, Chorus and Orchestra of La Scala, Milan	Disque Dom; Cat:FOR17010; Live performance, recording released 2014; Sung in Italian
1969	Joan Sutherland; Martina Arroyo; Huguette Tourangeau; Anastasios Vrenios; Nicola Ghiuselev; Dominic Cossa; Gabriel Bacquier	Richard Bonynge; Philharmonia Orchestra; Ambrosian Opera Chorus	CD: Decca; Cat: 430 549-2
1971	Rita Shane; Enriqueta Tarres; Jeanette Scovotti; Nicolai Gedda; Justino Diaz; Pedro Farres; Dimitri Petkov	Ernst Märzendorfer; Ö1 International orchestra and chorus (broadcast from Konzerthaus, Vienna on 17 Feb)	CD: Opera D'Oro; Cat: 1464
1988	Ghyslaine Raphanel; Françoise Pollet; Danièle Borst; Richard Leech; Nicola Ghiuselev; Gilles Cachemaille; Boris Martinovich	Cyril Diederich; Orchestre national de Montpellier Languedoc-Roussillon; Opéra national de Montpellier chorus	CD: Erato; Cat: 2292-45027-2
1990	Joan Sutherland; Amanda Thane; Suzanne Johnston; Anson Austin; Clifford Grant; John Pringle; John Wegner	Richard Bonynge; Opera Australia orchestra and chorus (Stage director: Lotfi Mansouri)	DVD: Opus Arte; Cat: OAF 4024D; DVD: Kultur
1991	Angela Denning; Lucy Peacock; Camille Capasso; Richard Leech; Martin Blasius; Lenus Carlson; Hartmut Welker	Stefan Soltesz; Deutsche Oper Berlin orchestra and chorus (Stage director: John Dew; video director: Brian Large)	Blu-ray/DVD: Arthaus Musik; Cat: 108 084/100 156; Sung in German
2003	Desirée Rancatore, Annalisa Raspagliosi, Sara Allegretta, Warren Mok, Soon-Won Kang, Marcin Bronikowski, Luca Grassi	Renato Palumbo, Orchestra Internazionale d'Italia, Bratislava Chamber Choir	CD: Dynamic; Cat: CDS422
2009	Erin Morley, Alexandra Deshorties, Marie Lenormand, Michael Spyres, Peter Volpe, Andrew Schroeder, John Marcus Bindel	Leon Botstein, American Symphony Orchestra, Bard Festival Chorus (Performed live at the Fisher Center at Bard on 2 August)	CD: American Symphony Orchestra; Cat: ASO093
2018	Lisette Oropesa, Ermonela Jaho, Karine Deshayes, Yosep Kang, Nicolas Testé, Florian Sempey, Paul Gay	Michele Mariotti, Paris Opera Orchestra & Chorus (Stage director: Andreas Kriegenburg)	HD video: Paris Opera Play

== Arias ==
Several late 19th-century singers versed in the genuine Meyerbeerian performance style made acoustic gramophone recordings of arias from Les Huguenots. Many of these early recordings have been remastered and reissued on CD recitals.
