= Ivan IV (opera) =

- Opera by Georges Bizet
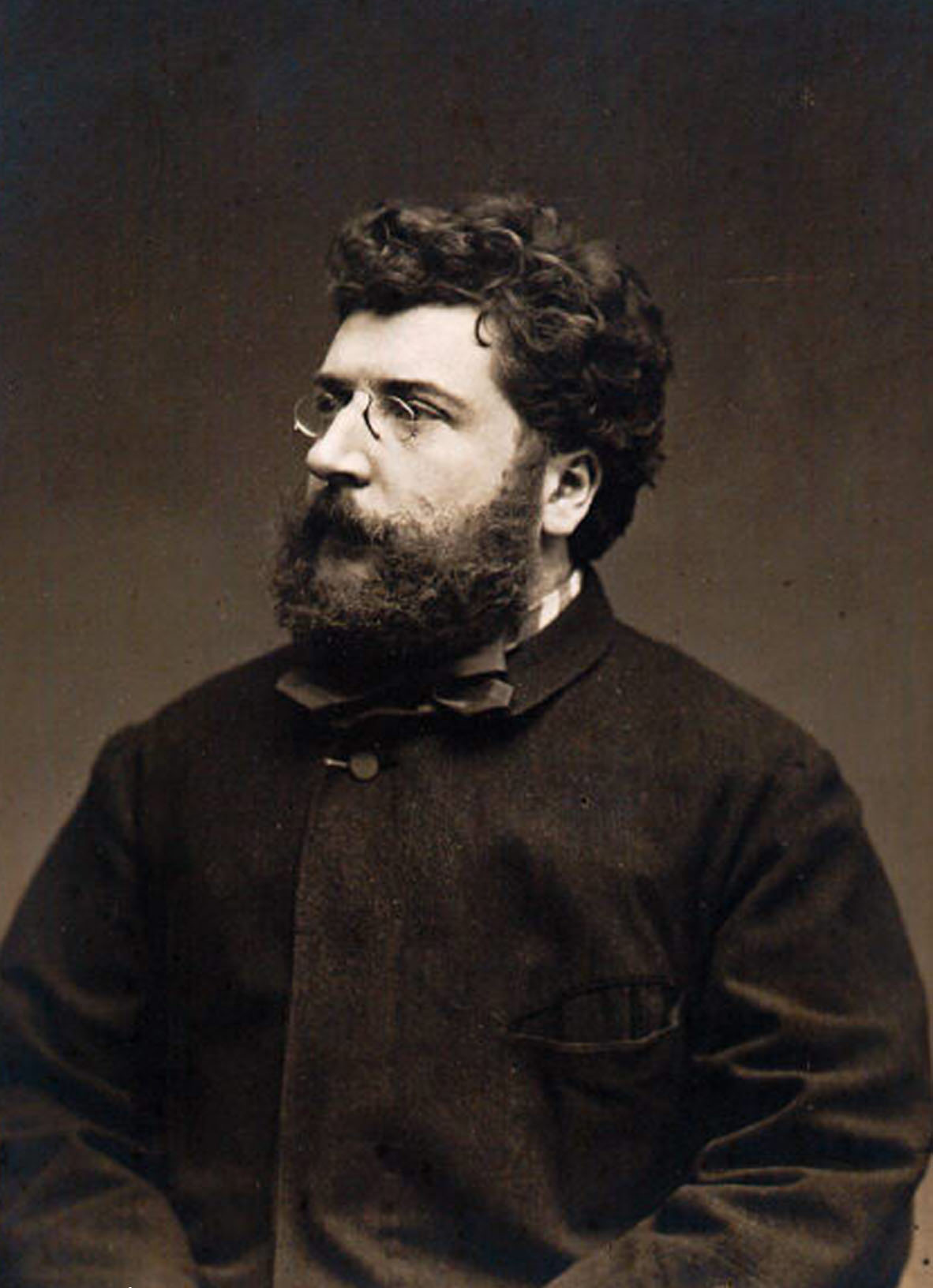
- Bizet in 1875
- Librettist: Francois-Hippolyte Leroy; Henri Trianon
- Language: French
- Based on: Life of Ivan the Terrible

Ivan IV is an opera in five acts by Georges Bizet, with a libretto by Francois-Hippolyte Leroy and Henri Trianon.

== Composition history ==
A libretto on the subject of Tsar Ivan IV "The Terrible" of Russia was offered to Charles Gounod in January 1856 by the general administrator of the Paris Opera, François Louis Crosnier. Gounod worked with enthusiasm and press announcements anticipated that rehearsals would begin that November. Although Gounod completed the work in 1857 or 1858, failure to have it performed at the Paris Opera led Gounod to use parts of the score in later works; the Soldiers’ Chorus in Faust came from Ivan the Terrible. Gounod's score was auctioned in 1963 and destroyed shortly after.

Around 1862, with Gounod's encouragement, Bizet began work on the same libretto. In June 1865 the journal La France Musicale announced that the piece would appear at the Théâtre Lyrique that winter. Delays in getting the piece accepted prompted Bizet to offer the score to the Paris Opera, but he had no reply. The following summer, at the bidding of Léon Carvalho, director of the Théâtre Lyrique, Bizet started work on La jolie fille de Perth, and Ivan IV was forgotten.

Winton Dean floated a possible alternative chronology by suggesting that the surviving manuscript is an earlier abandoned version of Ivan, forgotten by the composer, not that which was being copied for performance in the autumn of 1865. This theory would mean that Bizet composed Ivan the Terrible in late 1862 and early 1863 for performance in 1863 at the Baden festival (which he had visited with Hector Berlioz, Gounod and Ernest Reyer). Dean also argues for Ivan pre-dating Les pêcheurs de perles on the basis of the more conspicuous weak passages in the score bearing witness to a less experienced stage composer; also several passages in Ivan are developed further in the 1863 work.

A manuscript score was found among the papers of Émile Straus (whom Bizet's widow had married) when he died in 1929, given to the Bibliothèque nationale, and put on public display at the Bizet Centennial Exhibition in 1938. A first concert performance with piano accompaniment may have taken place in 1940, and another in the winter of 1943 at the Théâtre des Capucins. When Choudens asserted their right to publish the score in 1943, Henri Büsser took over its preparation and, instead of following the almost complete manuscript, concocted his own 'performing version'.

The libretto is typical of the Eugène Scribe school, dealing with the manipulation of often improbable stock dramatic situations, rather than musical characterisation. The strongest musical influences are Meyerbeer, Gounod, and Verdi.

== Performance history ==
Following a private performance of this revised score – in four acts instead of five and with many cuts – at Mühringen Castle near Tübingen, it was performed at the Grand Théâtre de Bordeaux on 12 October 1951, the company giving two performances of their production at the Opéra-Comique in Paris that December. The work then had performances in Cologne in April 1952, and Bern, Switzerland in December 1952. In the 1970s a more faithful edition was prepared for the BBC, with previously cut material restored; this version was broadcast by the BBC in October 1975, with Bryden Thomson conducting a mainly UK-based cast, with John Noble in the title role, and Jeanette Scovotti and John Brecknock as Marie and Igor; this studio recording was issued on unofficial records. Subsequently, the conductor Howard Williams produced a complete performing edition, using his own version of the incomplete final scene (recycled from Bizet's material), which he performed at the Montpellier Festival – a performance broadcast by French Radio. A live recording of this version, now adopted by Choudens, was made in March 2002 conducted by Michael Schønwandt and issued by Naïve.

Following a premiere production of the full five-act version in St Petersburg in December 2022, the same version was produced at the Staatstheater in Meiningen in February 2023 conducted by Philippe Bach with Tomasz Wija in the title role and Alex Kim, Mercedes Arcuri and Paul Gay among the cast.

== Roles ==
| Role | Voice type | Cast, 12 October 1951 (Conductor: Adolphe Lebot) |
|---|---|---|
| Ivan IV, Tsar of Russia | bass | Pierre Nougaro |
| Marie, daughter of Temrouk | soprano | Georgette Camart |
| Igor, brother of Marie | tenor | Miro Skala |
| Temrouk, Prince of Circassia | bass | Michel Taverne |
| Yorloff, a boyar | bass-baritone | Charles Soix |
| A young Bulgarian | mezzo-soprano/tenor | René Coulon |
| Olga, sister of Ivan | mezzo-soprano | Marthe Couste |
| A Russian officer | tenor | Paul Grosjean |
| A Circassian | bass | Raymond Romanin |
Chorus - Circassian women, Russian soldiers, Boyars, Courtiers

== Synopsis ==
=== Act 1 ===
In the Caucasus

Women are collecting water from a spring; a stranger who has lost his way asks for help. Marie, daughter of Temrouk offers to show him the path. A second stranger, Ivan in disguise, enters and leaves with the young stranger. Russian soldiers burst in and order Temrouk to surrender his daughter to them. The king refuses, but when an officer threatens to murder the children, Marie goes with them. Igor arrives as the Circassians lament their fate, and he vows to kill the enemy. Temrouk orders that the avenger must be chosen by lot; it is Igor.

=== Act 2 ===
A banquet in the Kremlin

Boyars celebrating the victory of Ivan over the Tartars. Condemned criminals pass by begging for mercy but in vain. Ivan congratulates Yorloff, who had uncovered the conspiracy, and commands the young Bulgarian to sing of his homeland. The tsar responds with a battle song. Ivan had sought the most beautiful girl in the land to be his wife. Yorloff is confident that his own daughter will be chosen, and a group of maidens enter the hall. Ivan commands them to remove their veils, but Marie refuses. Although she is forced to do this, she refuses to become his wife. Ivan’s sister Olga passes through in a religious procession and Marie puts herself under her protection.

=== Act 3 ===
Kremlin courtyard

People sing praises on the marriage of Ivan and Marie. The cortege approaches and Igor steals on. Temrouk also enters at this moment. Yorloff reveals to Igor that he too has a grievance against Ivan and the three of them prepare to assassinate Ivan that night.

=== Act 4 ===
A room outside the nuptial chamber

Marie muses on her fate – she has fallen in love with Ivan. Ivan enters to lead her to the nuptial boat on the Volga. Yorloff tells the tsar that he will watch out for assassins, and when Ivan has left admits Igor. When Marie enters, brother and sister embrace and she is horrified when Igor tells her he has come to kill the tsar. Igor is about to stab her when Marie reminds him that their mother had placed her under the protection of her brother. He forgives his sister and embraces her. Ivan and Yorloff enter and the latter denounces Igor. Ivan, heartbroken by Marie’s supposed treachery hesitates to condemn her. An officer enters to announce that the Kremlin is on fire and enemies are attacking the gates. Ivan condemns Igor and Marie then collapses.

=== Act 5 ===
Scene 1 – the walls of the Kremlin

Temrouk is agonised by events: his children have been condemned to death. Ivan has regained his senses and enters, and when the bell announcing death of a tsar tolls, they both rush off to the palace.

Scene 2 – a hall in the Kremlin

Yorloff proclaims himself regent, as the tsar had lost his reason. The courtiers call for the death of Igor and Marie. Ivan bursts in and reveals Yorloff’s plots and condemns him to die. Courtiers sing praises to Ivan and Marie.

== Borrowings ==
Bizet re-used some music from earlier pieces and also recycled other sections in later works:

- Act 1. Duet for Young Bulgarian and Marie – used as the second part of the prelude to La jolie fille de Perth
- Act 1. Temrouk "Ah! Laisse-moi ma fille" – used in Bizet's completion of Fromental Halévy's opera Noé
- Act 2. Solo for the Young Bulgarian "Ouvre ton coeur" is taken from Vasco da Gama
- Act 4. Duet for Marie and Igor – Noé
- Act 5, Scene 1. Duet for sentry and officer – Jeux d'enfants: Trompette et Tambour.

== Recordings ==
- 1957 (excerpts) – Michel Roux, Janine Micheau, Henri Legay, Louis Noguéra; French Radio National Chorus, French National Radio Orchestra, conductor Georges Tzipine
- 1972 (complete) – Jean Phillipe Lafont, Janine Micheau, Henri Legay, Solange Michel; Choeurs et Orchestre de L'ORTF, conductor Pierre-Michel Le Conte; 1960s, Paris
- 2002 (complete) – Ludovic Tézier, Inva Mula, Julian Gavin, Paul Gay; Chorus and Orchestre National de France, conductor Michael Schønwandt

A complete BBC broadcast in the Bizet centenary year featured John Noble in the title role, Jeanette Scovotti, John Brecknock, Patricia Kern, with orchestra and chorus conducted by Bryden Thomson and included commentary by Winton Dean and all the versions of the war song; it was later made available by the Oriel Music Trust.
