= Julian Gavin =

Australian-British operatic tenor

Julian Gavin (born 1965) is an Australian-born British operatic tenor who has sung leading roles both in the United Kingdom and internationally. His full-length opera recordings include Don José in Carmen and the title roles in Ernani and Don Carlos for Chandos Records.

== Life and career ==
Julian Gavin was born in Melbourne to a musical family. His mother Val was a concert pianist and composer and his father Paul Gavin had been a professional singer before becoming a teacher. He received his Bachelor's degree in music from the University of Melbourne and then studied conducting at the Victorian College of the Arts in Melbourne before training as an opera singer, at first with his father, and then at the National Opera Studio in London. He initially covered roles for Opera North before making his UK debut as Alvaro in La forza del destino for English National Opera. He went on to sing for the company as its resident Principal Tenor in roles that included Alfredo in La traviata, The Duke of Mantua in Rigoletto, Rodolfo in La bohème, Cavaradossi in Tosca, and the title roles in The Tales of Hoffmann, Ernani and Il trovatore. He has since sung these roles in the opera houses of Europe, Australia, and North America.

Gavin has appeared in over ten productions for Opera Australia, including Romeo in Gounod's Roméo et Juliette for which he won the 2006 Green Room Award for Best Male Principal in an opera performance. His North American appearances have included Hoffmann in The Tales of Hoffmann (Washington National Opera 2001), Gustavo in Un ballo in maschera (Boston Lyric Opera 2007), and Dick Johnson in La fanciulla del West (Opéra de Montréal 2008). In October 2010, he made his role debut as Radames in Verdi's Aida for Opera Queensland.

The title role in Verdi's Don Carlos has been an important one in Gavin's career. He made his Royal Opera House debut in the role in 1996 when he took over from Roberto Alagna in Luc Bondy's production and sang it at the Edinburgh International Festival in 1998 as well as in productions at the New Israeli Opera, Opera North, and Minnesota Opera. In 2009 he recorded the role for the Chandos Opera in English series. Another key role (also recorded for Chandos) has been Don José in Carmen in which he made his debut at the Vienna State Opera and which he has also sung for the English National Opera, Zurich Opera, Opera Australia, Lausanne Opera, Royal Swedish Opera, and the Teatro Real in Madrid.

Gavin has sung the role of Riccardo/Gustavo in Verdi's Un ballo in maschera several times in his career, most recently for the Opéra National de Bordeaux in 2008, but in 2002 he made the news for not singing it. Before rehearsals began, he withdrew from the English National Opera's notorious production by Calixto Bieito which included a chorus of men seated on toilets, a mass Nazi salute and a homosexual rape scene. He was widely quoted as calling the production "a travesty" and "an act of artistic vandalism".

Although Gavin's principal repertoire is 19th-century Italian and French opera, he has sung in several works by Czech and German composers, notably Laca in Jenůfa (Opera North); Jenik in The Bartered Bride (Glyndebourne Festival Opera); Florestan in Fidelio (Opera Australia) and The Prince in Rusalka (Opera Australia). He has also appeared in two rarities: Bizet's unfinished opera Ivan IV at the Théâtre des Champs-Élysées in 2002 and César Franck's Hulda for the 1994 world premiere of the complete opera. His performances in 20th-century works include John Stephen Beaumont in Nicholas Maw's The Rising of the Moon, broadcast by the BBC in 1995 and Arvito in Italo Montemezzi's L'amore dei tre re which he sang for Opera Holland Park in 2007.

Gavin is now a British citizen and resides in London with his wife and five children. In addition to his opera performances he teaches in the Department of Vocal Studies at the Guildhall School of Music and Drama.

In 2015 Gavin was invited to become a Patron of the Australian performing arts charity, the Tait Memorial Trust; he has since joined their music board.

== Recordings ==
- Aroldo – Neil Shicoff (Aroldo), Carol Vaness (Mina), Anthony Michaels-Moore (Egberto), Julian Gavin (Godvino); Orchestra and Chorus of the Maggio Musicale Fiorentino conducted by Fabio Luisi. Label: Philips (recorded December 1997)
- 'Ernani – Julian Gavin (Ernani), Alan Opie (Don Carlo), Susan Patterson (Elvira); English National Opera Orchestra and Chorus conducted by David Parry. Label: Chandos Records (recorded July 2000).
- Ivan IV – Inva Mula (Marie), Ludovic Tézier (Ivan IV), Julian Gavin (Igor); Orchestre National de France, Choeur de Radio France conducted by Michael Schønwandt. Label: Naïve Records (recorded March 2002)
- Carmen – Patricia Bardon (Carmen), Julian Gavin (Don José), Garry Magee (Escamillo), Mary Plazas soprano (Micaëla); Philharmonia Orchestra, Geoffrey Mitchell Choir, New London Children's Choir conducted by David Parry. Label: Chandos Records (recorded September 2002).
- Don Carlos – Julian Gavin (Don Carlos), Alastair Miles (Philip II), Janice Watson (Elisabeth de Valois), Jane Dutton (Princess of Eboli), John Tomlinson (The Grand Inquisitor); Opera North Orchestra and Chorus conducted by Richard Farnes. Label: Chandos Records (recorded May 2009).

== Sources ==
- Broun, Ronald "Able New Cast in 'Hoffmann'", The Washington Post, 17 September 2001 (accessed 9 December 2009).
- Cummings, David M. (ed.), "Gavin, Julian", International Who's Who in Classical Music 2003, Routledge, 2003. ISBN 1-85743-174-X
- Dunnett, Roderic, "L'amore dei tre re, Holland Park, London", The Independent, 1 August 2007 (accessed 9 December 2009).
- Eichler, Jeremy, "Lyric Opera unmasks new 'Ballo'", The Boston Globe 31 March 2007 (accessed 9 December 2009).
- Gill, Raymond (10 April 2006). "Green Room awards go live". The Age.
- Gingras, Claude, "La Fanciulla del West: immense réussite", La Presse, 22 September 2008 (accessed 9 December 2009).
- Jury, Louise, "Homosexual rape scenes and Nazi salutes: Why Verdi wouldn't recognise his opera", The Independent, 21 February 2002 (accessed 9 December 2009).
- McHugh, Dominic, Interview: Julian Gavin on singing Don Carlos for Opera North and Chandos, Musical Criticism, April 2009 (accessed 9 December 2009).
- Reynolds, Nigel, "ENO's Masked Ball is 'an act of artistic vandalism', says tenor", The Daily Telegraph, 22 February 2002 (accessed 9 December 2009).
