= Il bel sogno =

Album of opera arias by Inva Mula

Studio album by Inva Mula
- Released: 6 October 2009
- Genre: Opera
- Length: 75:24
- Label: Virgin Classics

Il bel sogno (Italian for The Beautiful Dream) is the debut album by Albanian opera singer Inva Mula, released on October 6, 2009. It features music composed by Giacomo Puccini, Charles Gounod, Jules Massenet, and Giuseppe Verdi, performed by Inva Mula (soprano) and Agim Hushi (tenor) with the Zagreb Philharmonic Orchestra conducted by Ivo Lipanović. The album took its name from the album's first song, "Chi il bel sogno di Doretta" from Puccini's La rondine.

The album received mixed critical feedback.

== Track listing ==
No.	Title	From	Length
1.	"Chi il bel sogno di Doretta"	La rondine (Puccini)	3:16
2.	"Sì, mi chiamano Mimì"	La bohème (Puccini)	4:47
3.	"Donde lieta usci"	La bohème (Puccini)	3:11
4.	"O mio babbino caro"	Gianni Schicchi (Puccini)	2:32
5.	"Trahir Vincent"	Mireille (Gounod)	5:39
6.	"Voici la vaste"	Mireille (Gounod)	8:06
7.	"Allons, il le faut ... Adieu, notre petite table"	Manon (Massenet)	4:37
8.	"Le roi de Thule, Air des bijous"	Faust (Gounod)	11:12
9.	"Il ne revient pas"	Faust (Gounod)	5:37
10.	"Air de Miroir (Dis-moi que je suis belle)"	Thaïs (Massenet)	7:41
11.	"Addio del passato"	La traviata (Verdi)	7:37
12.	"È strano! ... Sempre libera"	La traviata (Verdi)	11:33
13.	"Caro nome" (digital bonus track)	Rigoletto (Verdi)	1:00
