= Heyboer =

Heyboer is a surname, variant of Dutch Heijboer, which means 'farmer on heath'. Notable people with the surname include:

- André Heyboer (born 1971), French contemporary baritone
- Anton Heyboer (1924–2005), Dutch painter and printmaker
- Laura Heyboer (born 1989), American soccer player

== See also ==
- Mathieu Heijboer
