= Henri Legay =

French opera singer

Henri Legay (1 July 1920 in Paris – 16 September 1992 in Paris) was a French operatic tenor. He was primarily French-based as his light lyric voice was especially suited to the French operatic repertoire.

== Life and career ==
Legay studied in Brussels and Paris, and won First Prize at the Conservatoire de Paris in 1947. To support himself he sang in cabarets to his own guitar accompaniment, also playing for Piaf and Montand, and also composing his own songs.

He began his career singing operetta. He made his operatic début at La Monnaie in Brussels in 1950, also appearing in Lausanne.

He began a long association with the Opéra-Comique in 1952, as Gérald in Lakmé, quickly establishing himself as one of the leading tenors of his time, other roles included; Nadir, Meister (singing in the 2,000th performance at the Salle Favart), des Grieux, Julien, etc. He made his debut at the Palais Garnier, as Damon in Les Indes galantes, other roles there included: Faust, Werther, Almaviva, Duke of Mantua, Alfredo, etc.

He left a few recordings, Les pêcheurs de perles, Le roi d'Ys, excerpts from Ivan IV, and most notably, the famous 1955 recording of Manon, opposite Victoria de los Ángeles and conducted by Pierre Monteux, widely regarded as the definitive recording of Massenet's opera.

He participated in radio recordings broadcast on the Third Programme in the 1950s. In his obituary, Alan Blyth described Legay's voice as "light yet penetrating timbre, its flexible, liquid character" and that he used it "with fastidious taste" and displayed "keenness of word-painting allied to the inflections of the music".

Along with such mid-twentieth century tenors as Alain Vanzo and Léopold Simoneau, Legay represented a lost style of French operatic singing.

== Sources ==
- Operissimo.com
- Naxos Biography
