= Avni Mula =

Albanian singer and composer (1928–2020)

- Born: 4 January 1928; Gjakova, Kingdom of Serbs, Croats, and Slovenes (now Kosovo)
- Died: 29 October 2020 (aged 92); Tirana, Albania
- Occupations: Singer; composer
- Relatives: Inva Mula (daughter)
- Awards: People's Artist Honor of the Nation
- Musical career
- Instrument: Vocals

Avni Mula (4 January 1928 in Gjakova – 29 October 2020 in Tirana) was an Albanian singer and composer. For his contribution to the arts, he received two of the highest awards from the Albanian government: the People's Artist of Albania decoration and the Honor of the Nation (Nderi i Kombit) decoration.

== Personal life ==
Mula's family moved from Gjakova, Kosova to Shkodër, Albania, when he was young, and after World War II, he moved to Tirana, Albania. He studied at the Tchaikovsky Conservatory and graduated in 1957 as a lyric singer. While studying in Moscow, he married Nina Mula (23 November 1931 – 12 December 2011), a Russian woman from Izhevsk. He is the father of the soprano Inva Mula.

== Career ==
=== Singing ===
Mula was part of the National Troupe of Songs and Dances (Ansambli i Kenges dhe Valleve) and the Troupe of the Army (Ansambli i Ushtrise). In addition, he won many prizes over his career as a composer and singer in the Festivali i Këngës (Albanian Festival of Song), which is held every year in Tirana. Mula was a baritone.

=== Composition ===
Mula composed many songs over the span of his career. Some of the most famous are:

- "Nënë Moj Do Pres Gërshetin" (Mother, I'll cut Off My Braid), which won first prize in the 1976 Festival and was interpreted by Vaçe Zela.
- "Këngët e atdheut tim" (Songs of My Country)
- "Valsi i Lumturisë" (The Waltz of Happiness).
- "Një Djep Në Barrikadë" (A Cradle on the Barricade), sung by Marina Grabovari. The song won first prize in the 1982 Festival.

Mula also wrote an opera, Nënë Shqipëri (Mother Albania) and two compositions for the films Lume Drite (River of Light) and Karnavalet (Carnivals).

=== Festival jury ===
In 1998, Mula, head of the jury of the Festivali i Këngës, declared Albërie Hadërgjonaj's song "Mirësia Dhe e Vërteta" the winner, making Hadërgjonaj the first Kosovar-Albanian singer to ever win the festival.

== Awards and recognition ==
Mula received two of the highest awards from the Albanian government: the People's Artist of Albania decoration and the Honor of the Nation (Nderi i Kombit) decoration.
