= Armand Limnander =

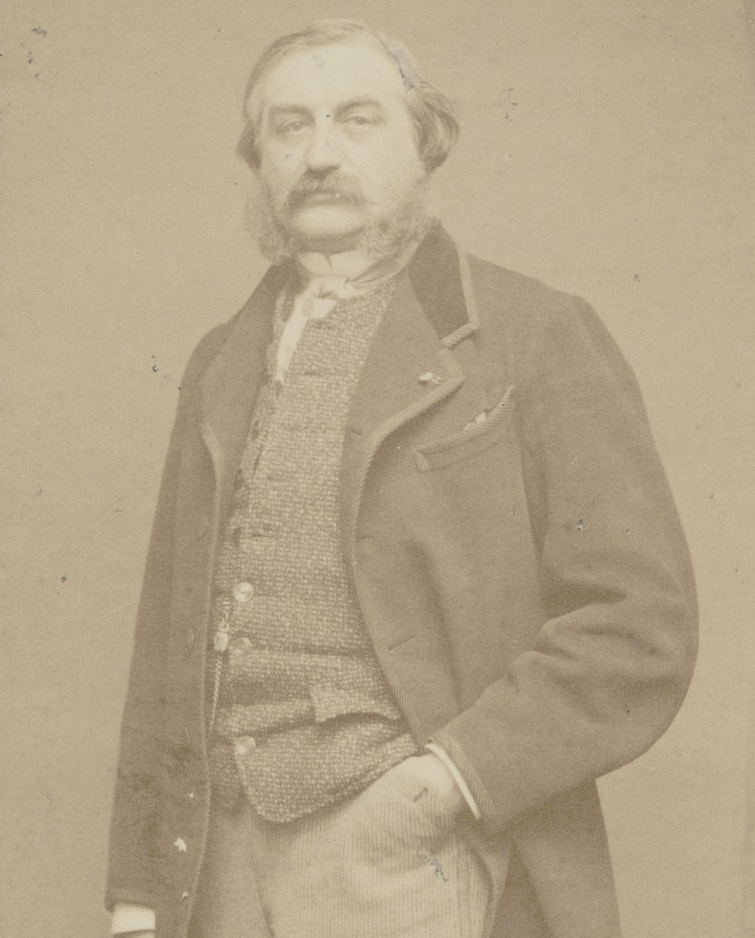

Baron Armand-Marie Ghislain Limnander van Nieuwenhove (born 22 May 1814 in Ghent – d. 15 August 1892 at the Château de Moignanville, a village in the department of Seine-et-Oise, France) was a Belgian composer of choral and orchestral works and church music. Knight of the Order of Leopold, he was the founder and conductor of the choral chamber ensembles Société Symphonique and Réunion Lyrique in Belgium.

== Biography ==
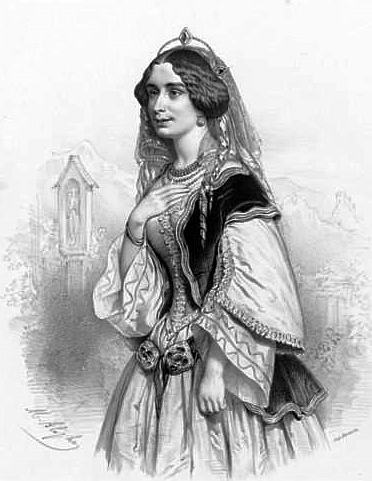
Delphine Ugalde as Béatrix in Armand Limnander van Nieuwenhovens opera The Montenegrins.

Born to a family who formerly belonged to the bar of the late Council of Flanders, ennobled in 1683, Armand Limnander van Nieuwenhoven was raised in the village of Malines. He studied in Freiburg with Louis Lambillotte and in Paris with François-Joseph Fétis, director of the Royal Conservatory of Brussels. From 1838 to 1847 he conducted with great distinction the direction of an amateur choral society entitled Réunion Lyrique composed of 25 members, for which he wrote a number of musical pieces for male voices and which eventually came to establish his reputation in festivals and competitions.

In 1845, prompted by the desire to work for the stage, he left for Paris. The following year he performed at the chateau des Tuileries, in the presence of King Louis Philippe I, three choir excerpts from his Scènes druidiques with orchestral accompaniment under the direction of Daniel Auber. In 1847 Limnander decided to settle in the French capital, where his dramas and lyrical operas such as The Montenegrins (1848), by librettists Gérard de Nerval and Jules-Édouard Alboize de Pujol, which premiered there on 31 March the following year, was very well received along with his Le Château de la Barbe-Bleue (1851). In the course of 1853 the composer was working on two books, one for the Opera House and the other to the Opéra-Comique of Paris. The first of these pieces Le Maitre à Chanter, a grand opera in two acts set to a libretto of Henri Trianon, choreographed by Joseph Mazilier, successfully premiered at the Academy of Music on 17 October 1853. His opera Yvonne (1859), set to a libretto by Eugène Scribe, premiered at the Theatre de l'Opéra-Comique on 29 November 1859 and was also well received.

His religious music is composed of a Te Deum, performed in 1845 on the anniversary of the avencement to the throne of King Leopold, a Requiem, written in honor of the citizens killed in the upheaval of 1830 and performed in Brussels in September 1852, the Stabat Mater La Messe de minuit, performed by the choir Harmonie à Bruxelles in April 1853, during the political majority of Prince Leopold, Duke of Brabant, and a national song for full orchestra with text by André Henri Constant van Hasselt, written for the celebration of the national festivities in Brussels in 1855.

== Genealogy ==
Son of Benoit Jérôme Limnander de Nieuwenhod and of French Countess Mallet de Coupigny, married on 30 September 1835 at the chateau de Ramsdonck Éléonore-Euphémie-Antoinette-Ghislain (21 August 1808 – 13 October 1848), née de Meester, daughter of François-Théodore and Ignace-Julie de Giey. His first daughter was Elmire-Philomème-Celine Marie-Ghislain (17 January 1837). His first son was Albert-Antoine-Victoire-Marie-Ghislain Limnander de Nieuwenhove (5 November 1838). Athanase-Antoine-Marie-Ghislain (5 November 1840), Raoul-Auguste-Théodore-Antoine-Marie-Ghislain (8 October 1841 – 1845), and Théodore-Hubert-Marie-Ghislain (18 August 1843).

Armand Limnander was made Knight of the Order of Leopold from 1850, and married on 7 June 1850 in Paris, Rose Caroline Blin, daughter of Louis François Toussaint and Marie Caroline Gosselin. His first son was Louis-Armand-Victor-Marie-Ghislain Limnander de Nieuwenhover (7 December 1850 – 7 August 1853), Fernand Louis Marie Ghislain Limnander de Nieuwenhover (20 December 1854) and Gaston Eugène Marie Ghislain Limnander de Nieuwenhover (20 March 1856).
