= La maison du docteur =

- Opéra comique by Georges Bizet
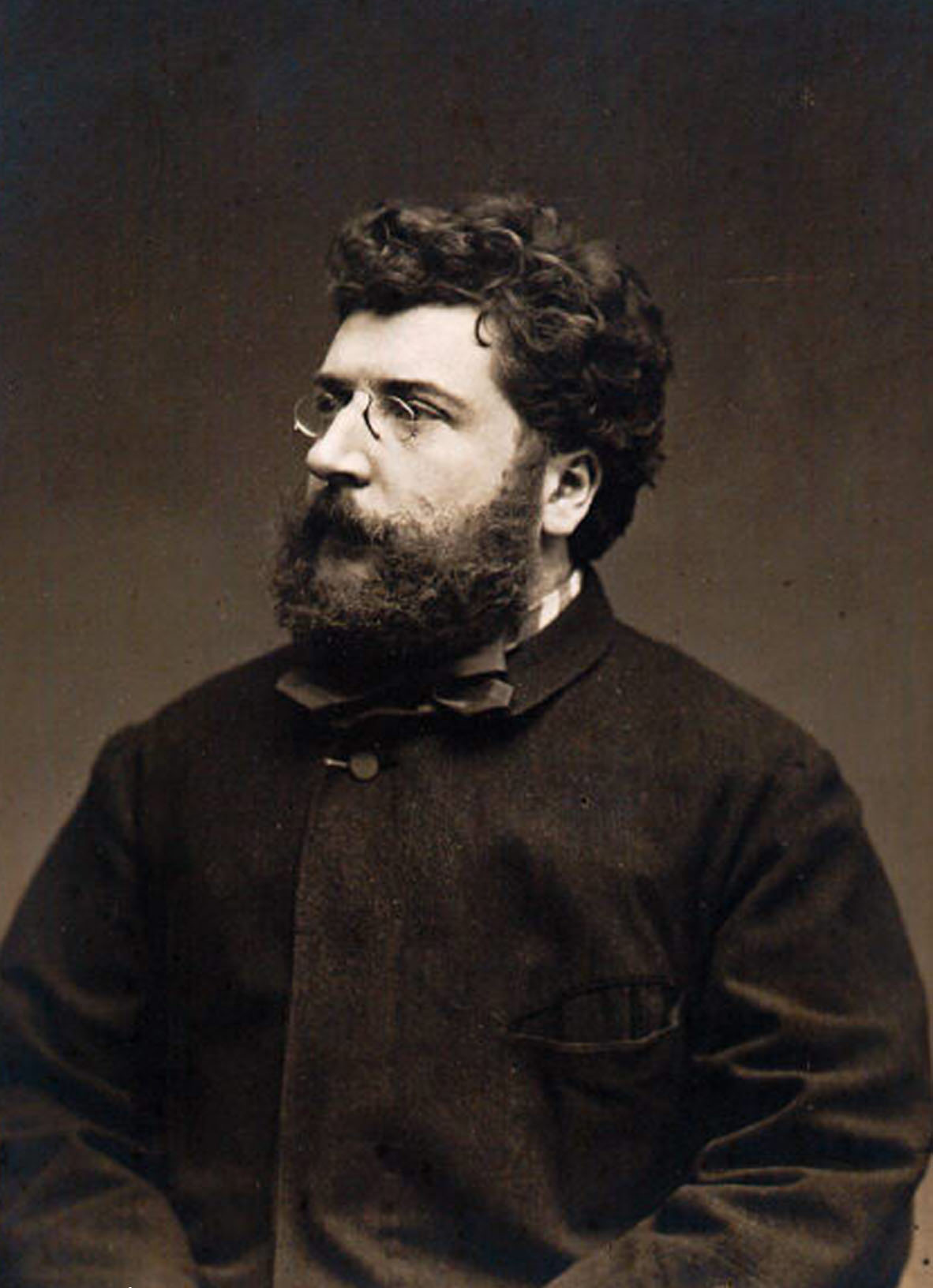
- Bizet in 1875
- Librettist: Henry Boisseaux
- Language: French

La maison du docteur is an opéra comique in one act by Georges Bizet with a French libretto by Henry Boisseaux. Some music scholars assert that the opera was composed in 1852 while others believe that it was written in 1855. Either way the composition is the first opera written by Bizet. La maison du docteur has never been performed and while the music does survive in piano score only, the work has never been published.

An orchestration of the piano score was performed on 9 February 2012 by the Orchestre de la Bastille at the Auditorium St. Germain in Paris.
