= Louis Deffès =

French composer

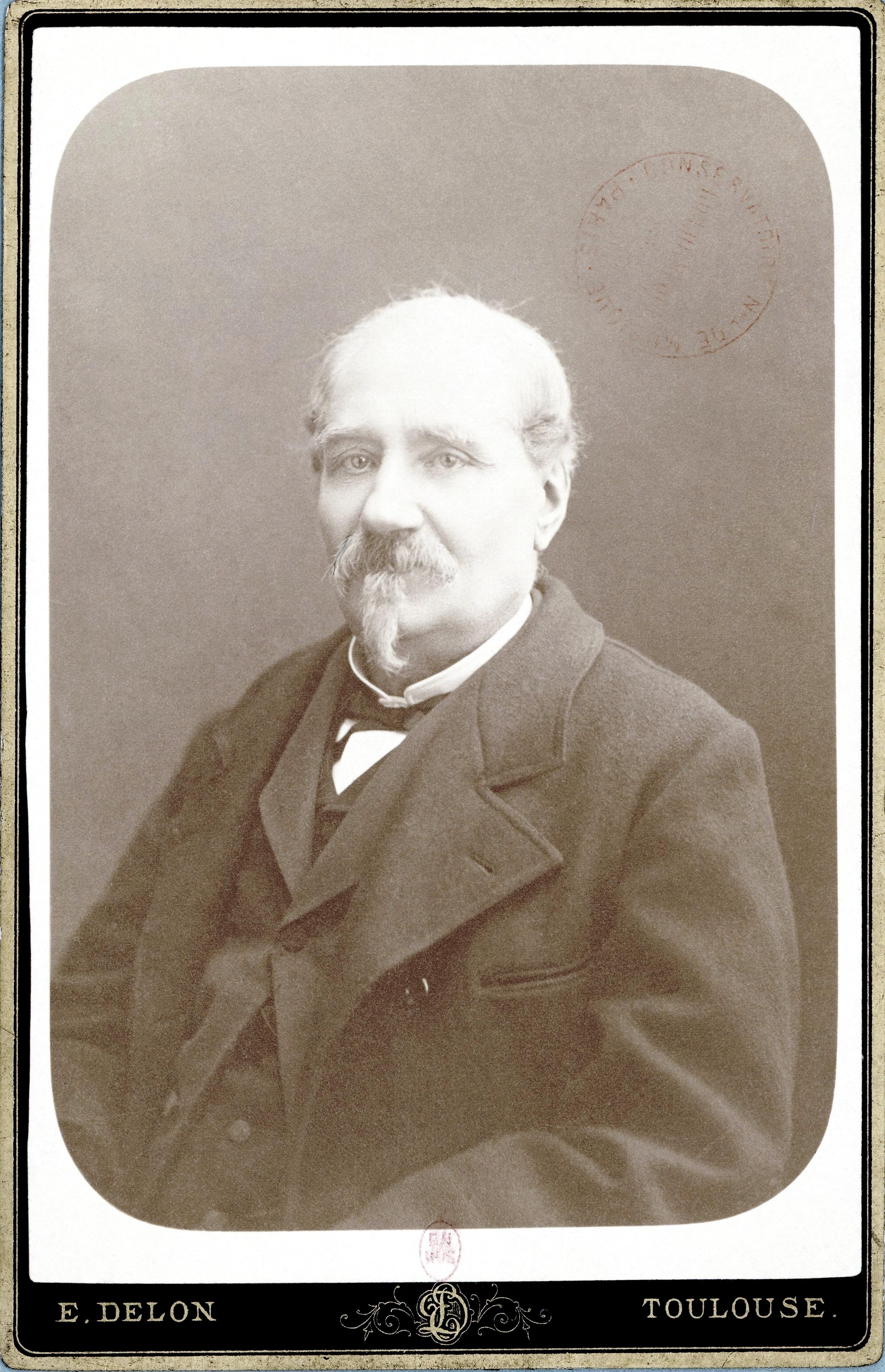
- Louis Deffès in 1890
- Born: 25 July 1819; Toulouse
- Died: 28 May 1900 (aged 80); Toulouse
- Occupation: Composer

Signature
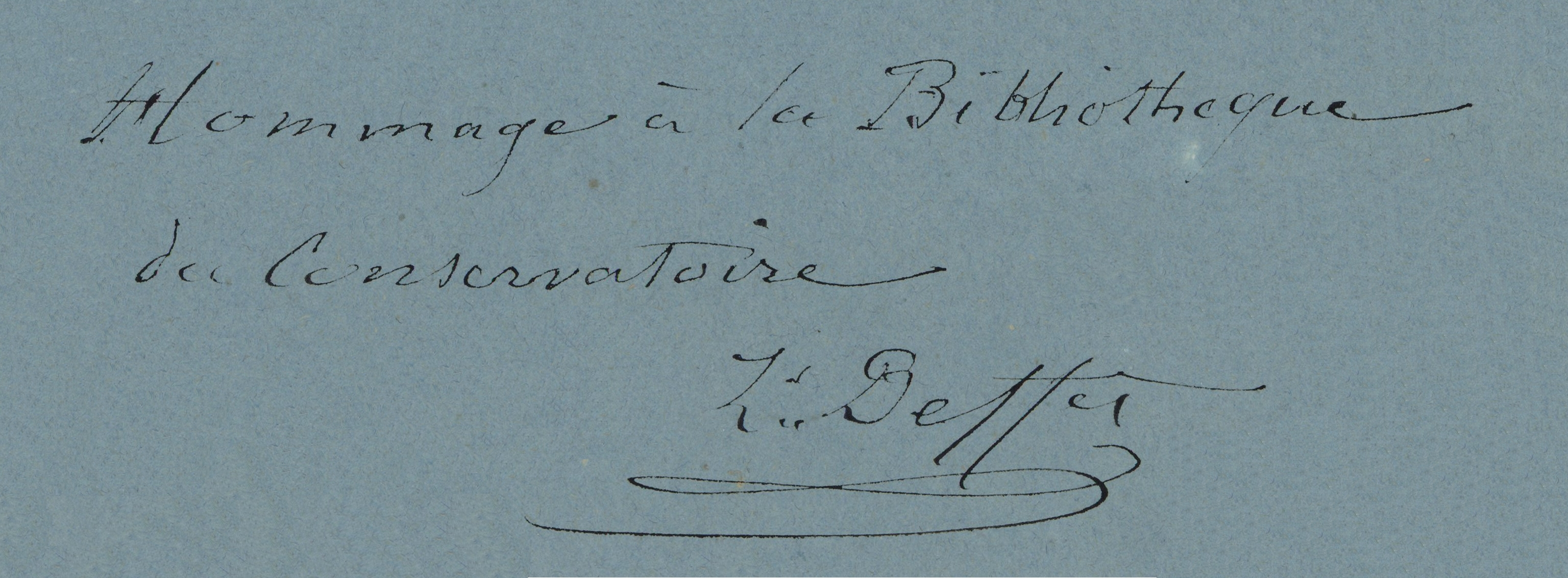

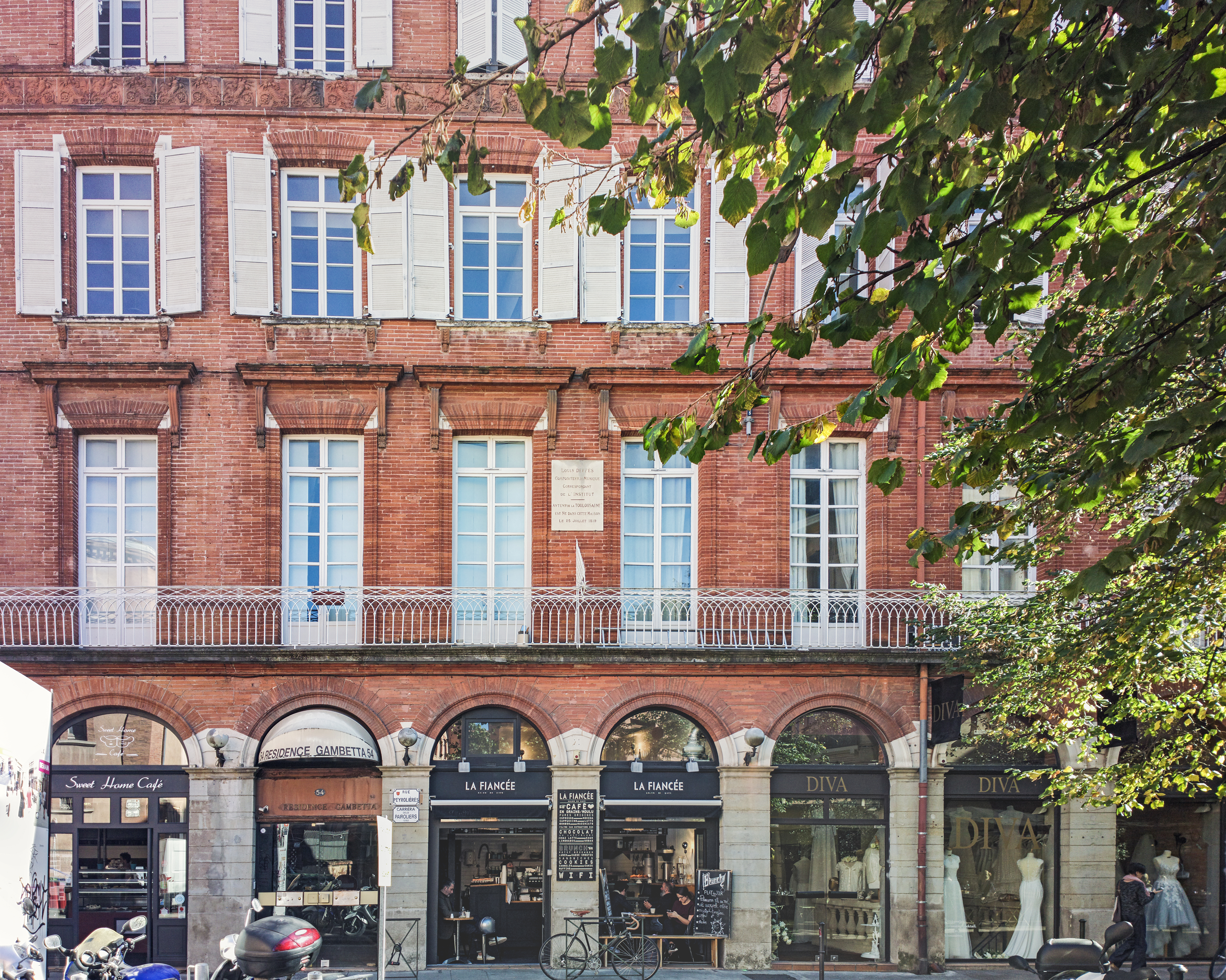
Birthplace of Louis Deffès in Toulouse

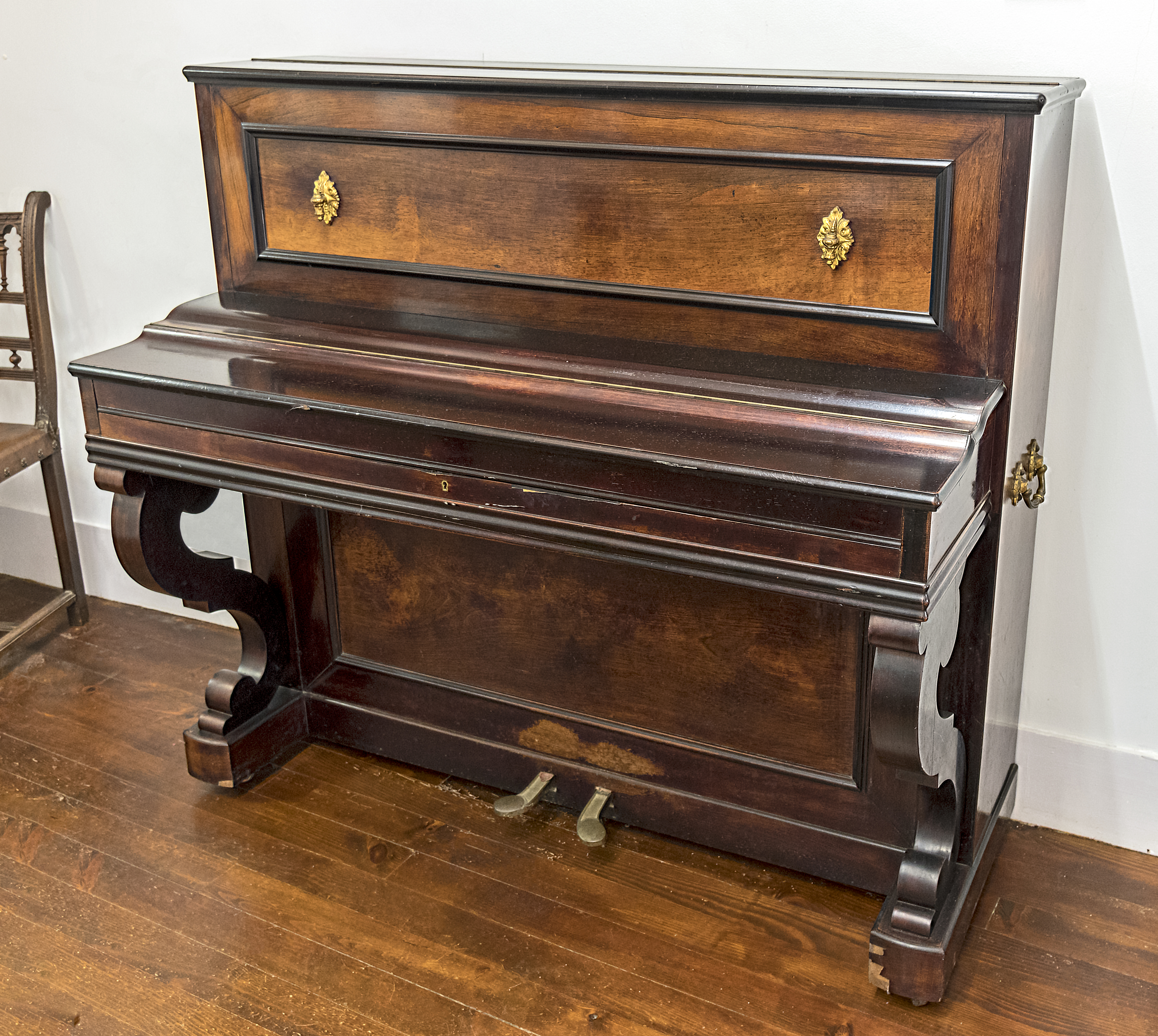
Piano of Louis Deffès in Musée du Vieux Toulouse

Pierre Louis Deffès (25 July 1819 – 28 May 1900) was a 19th-century French composer. He excelled as a composer of both operas and large-scale sacred music.

== Life ==
Deffès was born in Toulouse and admitted to the Paris Conservatory in 1839, where he studied with Fromental Halévy and Henri Montan Berton (composition), François Bazin (harmony), Auguste Barbereau (counterpoint and fugue), and Théodore Mozin (piano). In 1844, he composed La Toulousaine. The piece gained great popularity and became a signature tune of his home town. In 1847, he won second prize at the "Concours de Chants Historiques" with his composition Les Charmes de la Paix, and in the same year the Grand Prix de Rome with the cantata L'Ange et Tobie, based on a poem by Léon Halévy.

During his stay in Rome, which was connected with the prize, he composed his Messe solennelle, which was first performed in 1850. In 1857, a performance followed at Notre Dame de Paris with 500 participants. In 1855, L'Anneau d'argent, the first of his twenty successful operas, was premiered at the Opéra-Comique.

The Franco-Prussian War interrupted the succession of performances of his operas. Instead, he then wrote compositions such as the Marche funèbre, the motet Gaude floris, a Messe brève à trois voix and the song La Phrygienne for choir and piano.

With Le Trompette de Chamboran Deffès returned to the opera stage in 1877. His symphonic overture Un Triomphe à Rome was performed at the 1878 World Exhibition. A new mass by Deffès was performed at the Saint-Etienne Cathedral of Toulouse in 1879. Here he succeeded Paul Mériel as director of the Conservatoire de Toulouse in 1883. He held the position until his death, his successor was Bernard Crocé-Spinelli.

Deffès had been a member of the Association des Artistes Musiciens since its foundation in 1843 and belonged to its central committee; he was also a founding member of the Société des Compositeurs de musique (1863). In 1884, he became a corresponding member of the composition section of the Académie des Beaux-Arts. He was awarded the title of Knight of the Legion of Honour.

== Selected works ==
=== Opéras comiques ===
- La Lanterne magique, 1 act, lyrics by Auguste Carré
- L'Anneau d'Argent, 1 act, lyrics by Jules Barbier and Léon Battu (1855)
- La Clé des champs, 1 act, lyrics by Henry Boisseaux (1857)
- Broskovano, 2 acts, lyrics by Eugène Scribe and Henry Boisseaux (1858)
- Les Deux Bazile, 2 acts, libretto by Henry Boisseaux and Eugène Scribe 1858
- Les Petits violons du roi, 3 acts, libretto by Henry Boisseaux and Eugène Scribe (1860)
- Les Bourguignonnes, 1 act, lyrics by Henri Meilhac (1861)
- Le Café du Roi, 1 act, lyrics by Henri Meilhac (1861)
- Le Fantôme du Rhin, 1 act, libretto by Joseph Méry and Jules Adenis (1863)
- Valse et Menuet, 1 act, lyrics by Joseph Méry (1863)
- La Boite à surprises, 1 act, lyrics by Laurencin (1865)
- Les Croqueuses de Pommes, 5 acts, lyrics by Eugène Grangé and Émile Abraham (before 1868)
- Petit bonhomme vit encore, 2 acts, lyrics by Émile de Najac (1868)
- Le Trompette de Chamboran, 1 act, lyrics by Adolphe de Leuven and Jules Adenis (before 1877)
- Les Noces de Fernande, 3 acts, lyrics by Victorien Sardou and Émile de Najac (1878)

=== Operas ===
- Gessica, 4 acts, libretto by Jules Adenis after The Merchant of Venice by William Shakespeare (given in 1898 but composed before 1889)

=== Orchestral music ===
- Un Triomphe à Rome (symphonic poem)

=== Chamber music ===
Marche funèbre, for piano

=== Incidental music ===
- Passé minuit, music for the comédie en vaudevilles by Lockroy and Auguste Anicet-Bourgeois (1869)

=== Sacred music ===
- Messe solennelle
- L'Ange et Tobie (cantata on a poem by Léon Halévy)
- Cantate to words by Clémence Isaure
- Hosanna!. Chant d'Hyménée to words by Adolphe Pellier
- Tota pulchra es to words by Abbé Daix

== Bibliography ==
- Paul Feuga, Victor Marty: Louis Deffès, compositeur (Toulouse: Éditions Privat, 1920)
