= Nina Mula =

Russian-Albanian soprano (1931–2011)

- Born: 23 November 1931; Izhevsk, Udmurt Autonomous Oblast, RSFSR, Soviet Union (now Udmurtia, Russian Federation)
- Died: 22 December 2011 (aged 80); Tirana, Albania
- Occupations: Singer; composer
- Relatives: Inva Mula (daughter)
- Musical career
- Instrument: Vocals

Nina Odijankova Mula (Russian: Нина Одиянкова Мула, 23 November 1931 – 22 December 2011) was a Russian-Albanian soprano who spent most of her life in Albania, initially in Shkodër and then in Tirana, where she gained fame as a soprano of the National Theatre of Opera and Ballet of Albania (TKOB).

== Life ==
She was born on 23 November 1931 in the Udmurt capital of Izhevsk, in the RSFSR within the Soviet Union. After graduating from pedagogical school in her hometown of Izhevsk, in 1950 he completed his higher studies in canto at the Moscow Conservatory until 1955, where she then completed a postgraduate qualification. At the school, she met the canto student Avni Mula, whom she married.

She arrived in the People's Republic of Albania in September 1957 and was soon appointed soloist at the TKOB. She retired earlier than she had expected, in 1976, but in the meantime she pivoted to teaching. From 1965, she worked as a visiting lecturer at the Higher Institute of Arts (now the University of Arts, Tirana), teaching the most famous names of Albanian opera. During her activity here, she performed a large number of leading roles from operas by Albanian composers and from world literature, as well as a series of concerts with a rich and varied repertoire both within the country and outside Albania, such as in Czechoslovakia, Russia, Lithuania, Ukraine, and Latvia.

Shed died on 22 December 2011 at the age of 80. President Bamir Topi referred to her as "an excellent figure of the Albanian art" and Tirana Mayor Lulzim Basha said she gave inspiration "to an entire generation".

== Awards ==
- Order of Naim Frashëri, 2nd class
- Merited Artist
- Great Master of Work
