= Fredegundis (opera) =

1922 opera by Franz Schmidt

Fredegundis is a 1922 German-language opera in three acts by the Austrian composer Franz Schmidt, to a libretto by Bruno Hardt-Warden and Ignaz Michael Welleminsky after the novel with the same title by Felix Dahn. Schmidt's second and final opera, the plot concerns Fredegund, the widow of 6th century French King Chilperic I.

== Recording ==
Fredegundis - Dunja Vejzović soprano; Olga Sandu, contralto, Werner Hollweg tenor, Reid Bunger, Martin Egel basses. ORF Radio-Symphonieorchester Wien, conducted Ernst Märzendorfer. live recording 27 September 1979. Voce reissued Orfeo
