= Agim Hushi =

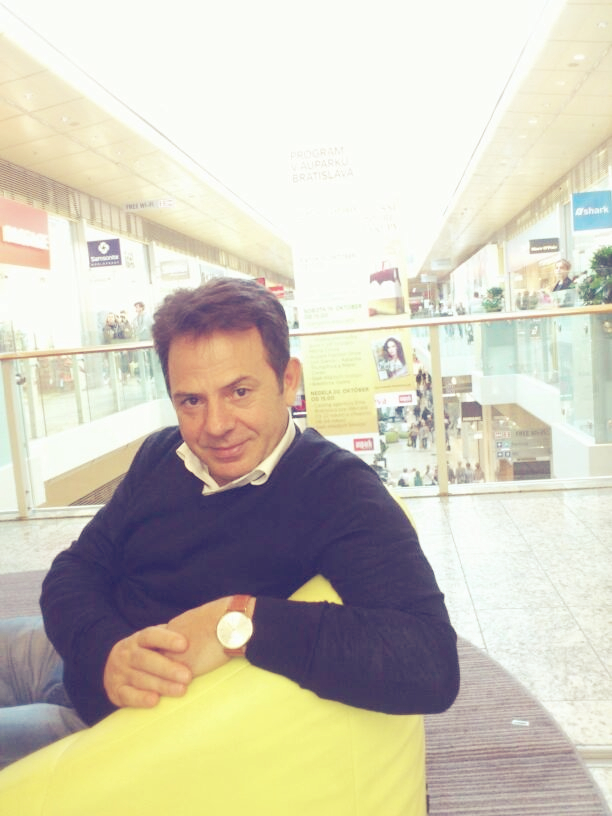
- Born: 1 May 1967 (age 58); Kavajë, Albania
- Occupation: spinto tenor
- Years active: 1990–2014
- Style: Classical music

Agim Hushi (born 1 May 1967) is an Albanian-born, Australian-naturalized spinto tenor currently living and working in Vienna, Austria.

== Life ==
Agin was born in Kavajë, Albania. After his university studies for literature and psychology in Tirana, Hushi was noted for his tenor voice. He studied at the Albanian Academy of Arts in Tirana from which he graduated in 1991.

From 1991 to 1992 he was principal tenor with the Albanian State Opera, where he performed in Tosca, Cavalleria rusticana and Il trovatore. From 1992 until 1995 he continued his postgraduate studies at the Franz Liszt Academy of Music in Budapest where, in parallel with vocal studies, he specialized in pedagogy of singing.

In 1995 he was appointed principal tenor at the Hungarian State Opera where he performed major roles including in Manon Lescaut, Turandot, Il tabarro, Il Lombardi.

In 1997, he moved to Australia after having been invited to perform the role of Des Grieux in Puccini's Manon Lescaut for the State Opera of South Australia in Adelaide conducted by Richard Bonynge. He then sang in the same opera for Opera Australia. Hushi continued to sing around Asia, New Zealand and USA.

In 1999 with an Australian government grant he went for a bel canto experience in Milan with Franco Corelli.

Hushi has performed in Australia, New Zealand, China, the United States, Malaysia, Singapore, Brunei, Dubai, Hungary, Germany, Russia, Slovenia, Macedonia, Kosovo, Croatia, Czech Republic, Romania, Bulgaria, France, Greece, Cyprus, Denmark, Italy, Spain, UK, Switzerland, Albania and Austria.

His primary roles are those of Cavaradossi (Tosca), Calaf (Turandot), Des Grieux (Manon Lescaut), Radames (Aida), Manrico (Il trovatore), Luigi (Il tabarro), Canio (Pagliacci) and Turiddu (Cavalleria rusticana).

In 2010 Hushi recorded with Albanian soprano Inva Mula for EMI her new CD, Il Bel Sogno with operatic arias supported by Zagreb Philharmonic Orchestra. In October 2012 Hushi recorded his first solo album, Amore Grande, with the most famous tenor songs conducted by A. Pavlic and the New Europe Symphony Orchestra, Bulgaria. This CD was regarded from Deutsche Grammophon and critics as one of the best CD since Giuseppe Di Stefano's best days in all tenors recordings. He returned to Albania for several years, later leaving for Australia in the late 2010s.

Hushi is currently the head of the opera department at the Vienna Conservatorium. He was a founder of Belcanto School of Singing in Adelaide, Australia.

== Awards ==
- September 1999: winner of the Jane Potter Foundation in Australia for his achievement in opera and for his high class performances on world opera stages.
- April 2000: awarded the Emerging Artist of the Year 2000 from the Premier of Australia.
- June 2005: awarded the Golden Medal of UN by Waheed Waheedullah, the ambassador of the United Nations in Albania
- 29 March 2012: awarded the Golden Medal, Great Master of Arts, by the Albanian president.
- 26 May 2012: received the title of Professor from Qingdao University of Technology, China
- 20 June 2012: awarded the title of Honorary Citizen at his native city of Kavajë.
