= Les Éclairs =

Opera by Philippe Hersant

Les Éclairs (The Lightning Flashes) is an opera in four acts to a libretto by Jean Echenoz with music by Philippe Hersant. It was premiered at the Opéra-Comique in Paris on 2 November 2021.

Based on a 2010 novel by Jean Echenoz, the opera is a fantasised biography of the inventor Nikola Tesla as the main character, Gregor. It depicts his arrival in America in 1884, a stormy relationship with Thomas Edison, Gregor's adoption by the (fictional) entrepreneur Parker and the support he receives from the (also fictional) philanthropist couple Ethel and Norman (the former of whom falls in love with Gregor). He is also supported by the journalist Betty. As with the real-life Tesla, Gregor becomes progressively obsessed with impractical projects and imagined extraterrestrial contacts.

== Roles ==
Roles, voice types, premiere cast
Role	Voice type	Premiere cast, 2 November 2021 Conductor: Ariane Matiakh
Gregor	baritone	Jean-Christophe Lanièce
Ethel	mezzo-soprano	Marie-Andrée Bouchard-Lesieur
Norman	tenor	François Rougier
Betty	soprano	Elsa Benoit
Edison	baritone	André Heyboer
Parker	baritone	Jérôme Boutillier
