= Franck Ferrari =

French opera singer

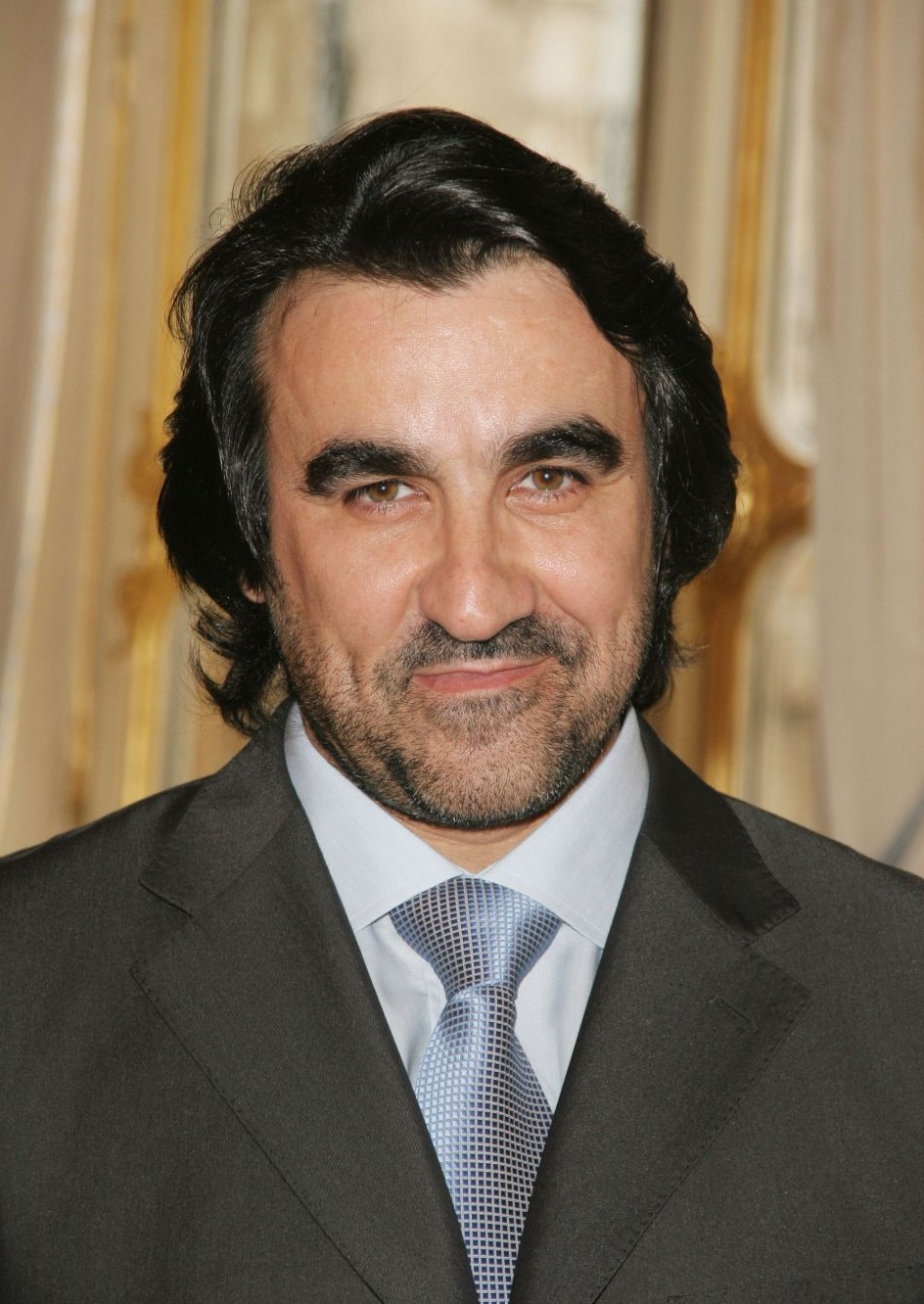
Franck Ferrari

Franck Ferrari (12 January 1963 – 18 June 2015) was a French baritone.

== Biography ==
Born in Nice, in a family of Italian origin, of a boxer father and a basketball mother and captain of the Cavigal Nice Basket, Ferrari studied at the Conservatory of Nice. After getting committed to parachuting at the age of 18, he returned to music. Thanks to his hard work, he became a renowned singer and performed on major international stages.

He died in 2015 at 52 years of age from a long illness.

=== Distinctions ===
- 2006: Chevalier des Arts et des Lettres

== Repertoire ==
Ferrari mastered about thirty roles in French and Italian opera from the 19th century. He interpreted his favourite role of Escamillo, in Carmen, both in France under the direction of Jean-Claude Casadesus and Michel Plasson, and in Los Angeles and Turin.

In October 2010, he interpreted the title role of Œdipe by Georges Enesco at the Théâtre du Capitole de Toulouse under the artistic direction of Nicolas Joel.

With pianist Dalton Baldwin, he recorded the complete melodies of Jacques Ibert.

=== Roles on stage (selection) ===
- Golaud in Pelléas et Mélisande, Paris Opera (2004)
- Marcello in La Bohème, Paris Opera (2005)
- Paolo in Simon Boccanegra, Paris Opera (2006)
- Les quatre rôles de basse in Les Contes d'Hoffmann, Paris Opera (2007)
- Oedipus in Œdipe, Théâtre du Capitole de Toulouse (2010)
- Scarpia in Tosca, Opéra de Paris (2011).
- Capulet in Roméo et Juliette, la Scala of Milan (2011)
