= Henri Trianon =

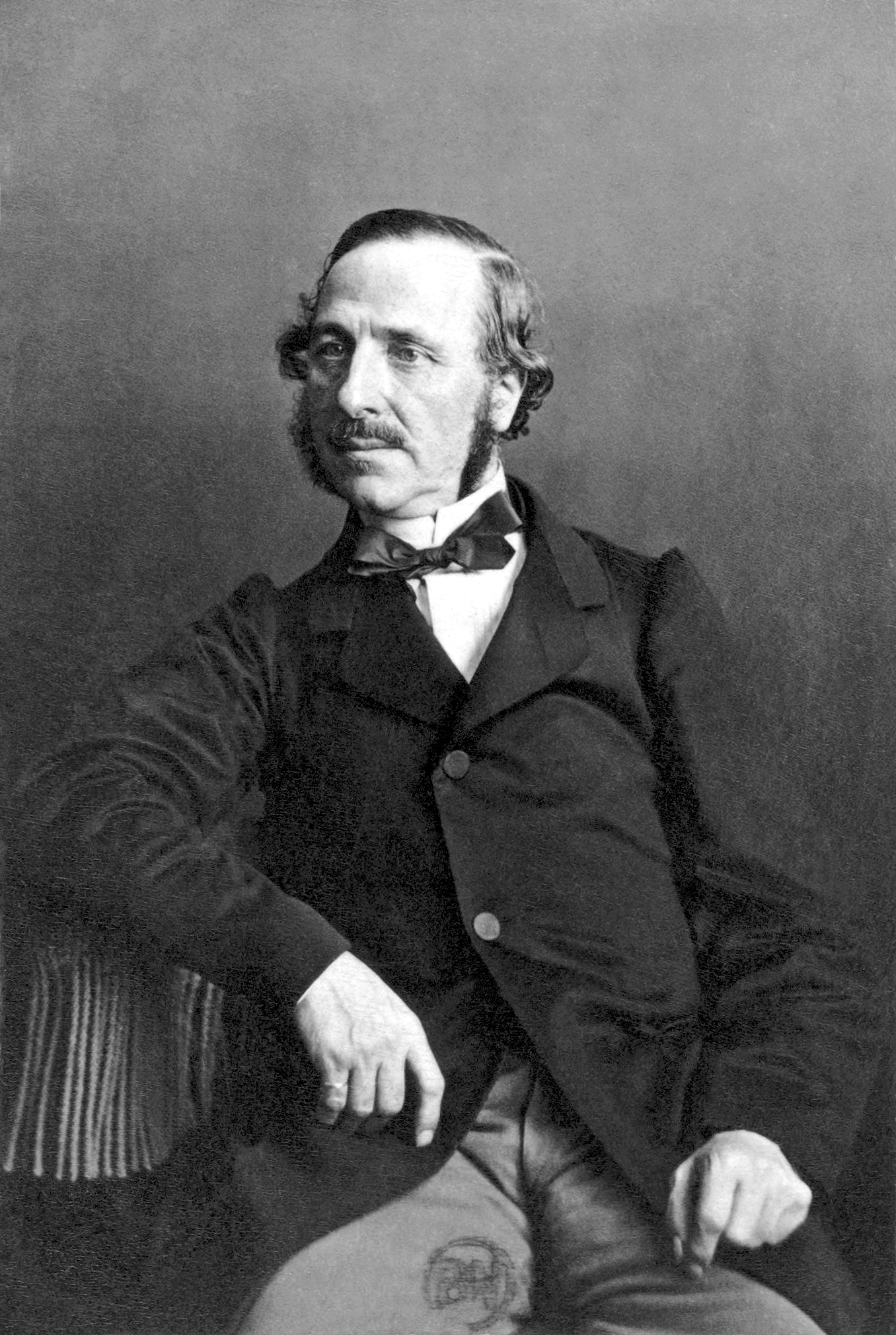
- Photograph by Nadar
- Born: 11 July 1811; Paris, France
- Died: 17 October 1896 (aged 85); Paris, France
- Occupations: critic, librettist, translator, librarian

Henri Trianon (11 July 1811 in Paris – 17 October 1896 in Paris) was a French critic, librettist and translator of works by Homer and Plato, and operas by Weber and Mozart into French. He was an artistic and literary critic in Paris who eventually became teacher. In 1842 he became under-librarian and then librarian at Sainte Geneviève in 1849. From 1857-59 Trianon was associated with Nestor Roqueplan in the administration of the Opéra-Comique.

He also wrote the libretto to the ballet Orfa by Adolphe Adam and several others, including Le Maître à Chanter (1853) by Armand Limnander, Pantagruel (1855) by Théodore Labarre, Les Bleuets (1867) by Jules Cohen, and Ivan IV by Bizet, which he co-wrote once it had been refused by Charles Gounod.
