= Jeux d'enfants (Bizet) =

Suite by Georges Bizet

Jeux d'enfants ("Children's Games") Op. 22, is a suite of twelve miniatures composed by Georges Bizet for piano four hands in 1871. The entire piece has a duration of about 20 to 23 minutes.

== Structure ==
The movement titles are as follows:

1. L'escarpolette – reverie (The swing)
2. La toupie – impromptu (The spinning top)
3. La poupée – berceuse (The doll)
4. Les chevaux de bois – scherzo (Wooden horses)
5. Le volant – fantasie (Battledore and shuttlecock)
6. Trompette et tambour – marche (Trumpet and drum)
7. Les bulles de savon – rondino (Soap bubbles)
8. Les quatre coins – esquisse (Puss in the corner)
9. Colin-maillard – nocturne (Blind man's buff)
10. Saute-mouton – caprice (Leap-frog)
11. Petit mari, petite femme – duo (Little husband, little wife)
12. Le bal – galop (The ball)

Originally there were ten numbers, with the seventh and eighth added after the first group; Trompette et tambour is adapted from a march at the start of act 5 of his opera Ivan IV. Bizet sold the work in both piano and orchestra form to Durand in September 1871 for 600 francs. Bizet's biographer Winton Dean considers it to be a forerunner of similar childhood-related works by Debussy, Fauré and Ravel. He goes to comment that each "evokes a facet of childhood, but there is not a trace of triviality, self-consciousness or false sentiment". Harman and Mellers argue that, with the music Bizet wrote for the stage production of L'Arlésienne, the Jeux d'Enfants represents the rediscovery of his true musical nature, exploring his melodic gifts, while the concentrated form of short pieces allowed him to discover chromatic and enharmonic subtleties both "simple and single-minded", in contrast with the more romantic nostalgia of Schumann in his childhood pieces.

== Orchestration ==
Bizet orchestrated six of these; in addition to No. 8, Nos. 6, 3, 2, 11, 12 became his Petite Suite; it is probable he also orchestrated No. 4. The remaining movements were later orchestrated by Roy Douglas (5 numbers) and Hershy Kay (2 numbers) and a complete orchestral suite has been recorded as Jeux d'enfants.

1. Marche
2. Berceuse
3. Impromptu
4. Duo
5. Galop

Bizet's version of No. 8, which contains an additional 48-bar section has been recorded by Michel Plasson, while the standard suite has been recorded many times.

== Adaptations ==
Sigfrid Karg-Elert wrote his orchestral suite after Bizet's Jeux d'enfants, Op. 21, in 1902.

In 1932, Léonide Massine choreographed the entire suite as the ballet Jeux d'enfants. Libretto by Boris Kochno, scenography by Joan Miró (Ballet Russe de Monte-Carlo, first performed at the Opéra de Monte-Carlo).

In 1955, George Balanchine choreographed the suite as the ballet Jeux d'enfants. In 1975 he made a new ballet, The Steadfast Tin Soldier, using only four of the movements.
