= Ludovic Tézier =

French operatic baritone (born 1968)

Ludovic Tézier (born 1968 in Marseille) is a French operatic baritone.

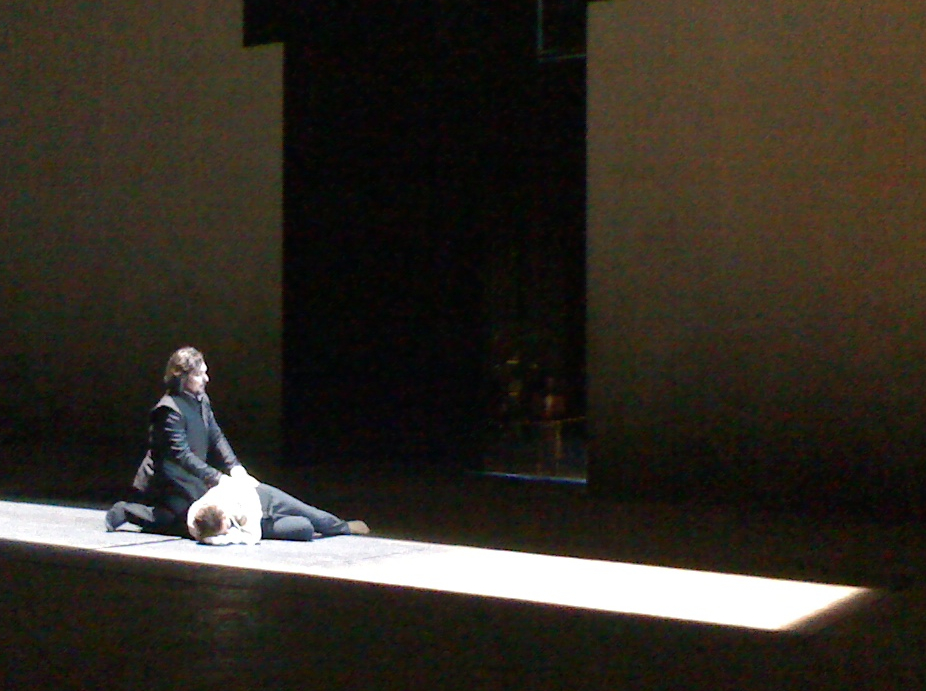
Tézier at the Opéra-Bastille, as Posa in Don Carlos

== Biography ==
Ludovic Tézier trained at the Paris Opéra’s École d’Art lyrique and at the Centre National d’Artistes Lyriques. He was a prize winner at Operalia, The World Opera Competition in 1998. He made his debut with the Lucerne Opera and then joined Opéra National de Lyon where he sang the title role in Mozart's Don Giovanni and the Count in the same composer's Le Nozze di Figaro, as well as in Donizetti's Don Pasquale and L'Elisir d'Amore. Tézier has appeared at many of the world's opera houses in a repertoire including works by Verdi, Wagner, Massenet, and Puccini. He has given solo recitals and appeared in concerts in Vienna, Strasbourg, Paris and other cities and has made numerous recordings and DVDs of operas and other musical works. Tézier was awarded the Chevalier de Ordre des Arts et des Lettres.

== Discography ==
Year	Title	Co-artists
2002	Bizet: Ivan IV	Inva Mula, Julian Gavin
2002	Puccini: Le villi	Melanie Diener, Aqulies Machado
2007	Die Operngala der Start – Live aus Baden-Baden	Anna Netrebko, Elina Garanca, Ramon Vargas, SWR Symphony Orchestra, Marco Armiliato
2011	Donizetti: Linda di Chamounix	Eglise Gutierrez, LSir Mark Elder, Orchestra of the Royal House, Covent Garden
2012	Bellini: Il pirata	Carmen Giannattasio, David Parry, London Philharmonic Orchestra
2021	Verdi	
2021	Verdi: Macbeth (1865 Version)[Live]	Silvia Dalla Benetta, Riccardo Zanellato, Giorgio Berrugi, David Astroga, Filarmonica Arturo Toscanini, Roberto Abbado
