= Jeanette Scovotti =

American coloratura soprano (born 1936)

Jeanette Scovotti (born December 5, 1936, in New York City) is an American coloratura soprano.

== Life and career ==
In 1956 Scovotti was in the ensemble of the original Broadway cast of Li'l Abner; the only Broadway production she ever appeared in. In 1959 she won the New York Singing Teachers' Association contest and presented a solo recital at Town Hall. That same year she made her debut at the New York City Opera as Monica in Gian Carlo Menotti's The Medium. In 1960 she made her debut with the Lyric Opera of Chicago as Olga Sukarev in Umberto Giordano's Fedora. In 1962 she made her San Francisco Opera debut as Blonde in Mozart's Die Entführung aus dem Serail and her Metropolitan Opera debut as Adele in Johann Strauss II's Die Fledermaus.

She became a regular at the Met from 1962-1966 appearing in 86 performances. Her roles at the Metropolitan Opera include Echo and Zerbinetta in Ariadne auf Naxos, Lisa in La sonnambula, Oscar in Un ballo in maschera, Xenia in Boris Godunov, Rosina in The Barber of Seville, Poussette in Manon, Zerlina in Don Giovanni, Gilda in Rigoletto, Papagena in The Magic Flute, Nannetta in Falstaff, Olympia in The Tales of Hoffmann, Fiakermilli in Arabella, and Adina in L'elisir d'amore.

In 1962, she and her husband, Fred Patrick, started the Lake George Opera company. She made her concert debut with the Boston Symphony Orchestra at the Tanglewood Festival in July 1963. In 1964 she performed the role of Tuptim in The King and I in a concert version with the Cleveland Pops Orchestra under conductor Lehman Engel. The production was recorded later in the studio with Barbara Cook as Anna and Theodore Bikel as the King. In 1966 she sang the title role in Donizetti's Lucia di Lammermoor with Giuseppe Bamboschek and the New Jersey Symphony Orchestra at Symphony Hall in Newark.

In 1967, Scovotti joined the roster of the San Francisco Opera where she stayed for only one season. At the SFO she appeared as the Queen of the Night in The Magic Flute, Musetta in La bohème, and Miss Hampton in the U.S. premiere of Gunther Schuller's The Visitation in 1966. Following her year in San Francisco, Scovotti moved to Germany and spent the next decade appearing in productions in Europe. She sang at many of the leading opera houses in Europe, including the Hamburg State Opera, Vienna State Opera, Teatro Colón, and La Scala. In 1977 she returned to the United States to sing the role of Ludmilla in Glinka's Ruslan and Ludmilla with Opera Boston. Scovotti now teaches singing in Germany.

== Recordings ==
=== Solo recordings ===
- Mozart Concert Arias with Herbert Blomstedt (conductor) and the Sächsische Staatskapelle Dresden. Berlin Classics label, 1979.
- Coloratura Arias (Lucia di Lammermoor, Die Zauberflöte, Il Turco in Italia, Rigoletto, Lakmé). Orchestra Sinfonica di Roma conducted by Nicolas Flagello. Scope Records, 1966.

=== Opera recordings ===
- George Frideric Handel: Rinaldo with La Grande Écurie et la Chambre du Roy and Jean-Claude Malgoire (conductor). Cast: Carolyn Watkinson (Rinaldo), Jeanette Scovotti (Armida), Ileana Cotrubas (Almirena) and Paul Esswood (Goffredo). Sony label.
- Giacomo Meyerbeer: Les Huguenots with Ernst Märzendorfer (conductor) and the Vienna Radio Symphony Orchestra. Cast: Nicolai Gedda (Raoul), Rita Shane (Marguérite), Justino Diaz (Marcel), Jeanette Scovotti (Urbain), Enriqueta Tarres (Valentine), and Dimiter Petkov (Saint Bris). Opera D'Oro label, 1971.
- Rameau: Castor et Pollux with Nikolaus Harnoncourt (conductor) and the Concentus musicus Wien. Cast: Gérard Souzay (Pollux), Märta Schéle (Venus). Telefunken, Das Alte Werke, 1972.
- Johann Strauss II: Eine Nacht in Venedig with the Hungarian National Philharmonic and Ernst Märzendorfer (conductor). Cast: Jeanette Scovotti (Annina), Wolfgang Brendel (Bartolomeo Delacqua). Acanta label.
- Johann Strauss II: Die Fledermaus with the Vienna State Opera and Oskar Danon (conductor). Cast: Jeanette Scovotti (Adele), Anna Moffo (Rosalinda), Sergio Franchi (Alfred), Risë Stevens (Orlofsky), Richard Lewis (Eisenstein), George London (Falke), and John Hauxvell (Frank). RCA label, 1963.
- Richard Strauss: Arabella with the Rome Radio Symphony Orchestra and Wolfgang Rennert. Cast: Montserrat Caballé (Arabella), René Kollo (Matteo), Kurt Moll (Count Waldner), Siegmund Nimsgern (Mandryka), Oralia Dominguez (Adelaide), Olivera Miljakovic (Zdenka), Carlo Gaifa (Count Elemer), and Jeanette Scovotti (Fiakermilli). Opera D'Oro label, 1973.
- Richard Strauss: Die schweigsame Frau with the Staatskapelle Dresden and Marek Janowski (conductor). Cast: Theo Adam, Annelies Burmeister, Wolfgang Schöne, Eberhard Büchner, Jeanette Scovotti, Carola Nossek, Trudeliese Schmidt, Klaus Hirte, Werner Haseleu, Helmut Berger-Tuna and Johannes Kemter. Angel label.
- Verdi: Falstaff with the Teatro Colón and Fernando Previtali (conductor). Cast: Geraint Evans (Falstaff), Eberhard Waechter (Ford), Luigi Alva (Fenton), Jeanette Scovotti (Alice Ford), Oralia Dominguez (Meg Page). Ornamenti label.

=== Musical recordings ===
- Li'l Abner Original Broadway Cast recording. Sony label, 1956.
- The King & I 1964 Cleveland Pops Cast. Columbia label, 1964.
- Army of Stars Salvation Army annual Christmas record. Private label, 1968.
