= Ernst Märzendorfer =

Austrian conductor (1921–2009)

Ernst Märzendorfer (26 May 1921 – 16 September 2009) was an Austrian conductor.

Märzendorfer was born in Oberndorf bei Salzburg. He studied with Clemens Krauss at the Mozarteum in Salzburg, and was appointed as first conductor of the Graz Opera in 1945. He conducted at the Teatro Colón in Buenos Aires in the early 1950s. In 1954 he became a guest conductor at the Salzburg Festival. From 1953 to 1958, he was the principal conductor of the Mozarteum Orchestra of Salzburg, and led several tours with the orchestra, including a highly acclaimed American tour.

He was appointed music director of the Salzburg Festival in Hellbrunn in 1976, where his highlights included twenty stage works by Jacques Offenbach. He was permanent conductor at the Vienna State Opera from 1961, and often appeared at the Berlin State Opera. In 1979 he revived Franz Schmidt's opera Fredigundis.

He died aged 88 in Vienna.

== Premieres ==
Märzendorfer's first performances of Richard Strauss's works included the following:

- the New York premiere of Capriccio
- the Rome premiere of Der Rosenkavalier
- the Berlin premiere of Die Frau ohne Schatten
- the Salzburg premiere of Strauss's last opera Des Esels Schatten (left incomplete by Strauss; orchestrated and completed by Karl Haussner)
- the Vienna premiere of the first version of the symphonic poem Macbeth.

His Richard Wagner premieres included the following:

- the first performances in Naples and Rome of Siegfried
- the Berlin premiere of Parsifal.

Other premieres were as follows:

- the world premieres of Hans Werner Henze's Tancredi and The Idiot (in Vienna), and
- the Vienna State Opera premiere of Igor Stravinsky's Les noces.

== Recordings ==
Recordings of note included the following:

- The first complete set of Haydn symphonies, which were virtually unknown due to limited US-only distribution.
- Vincenzo Bellini: I Capuleti e i Montecchi
- Georges Bizet: Carmen
- Emilio de' Cavalieri: Rappresentatione di Anima, et di Corpo
- Gaetano Donizetti: Lucia di Lammermoor
- Giacomo Meyerbeer: Les Huguenots
- Giuseppe Verdi: Aida, La traviata and Nabucco
- Harp concertos by Mozart, Boieldieu, Rodrigo, Handel, Spohr and others, with Nicanor Zabaleta
- Alberto Ginastera: Piano Concerto No. 1
- he recorded volumes 3, 4, 7, 10, 12 and 18 of the complete edition of Johann Strauss I's works with the Slovak Sinfonietta, and volume 17 of the music of Josef Strauss, with the Kosice Slovak State Philharmonic Orchestra.

Bruckner Symphony No. 0, with ORF Symphony Orchestra
