= Henry Boisseaux =

French playwright and opera librettist

- Born: Claude-Nicolas-Henry Boisseaux; 14 October 1821; Dijon
- Died: 20 November 1863 (aged 42); Paris
- Occupations: Playwright; Librettist

Claude-Nicolas-Henry Boisseaux (14 October 1821 – 20 November 1863) was a 19th-century French playwright and opera librettist.

== Biography ==
Boisseaux studied law in his hometown where he was destined to an important position when in 1852, he suddenly decided to move to Paris in order to try his luck in theatrical career. Less than two years later, he made his debut at the Theatre Lyrique by a success that earned him the possibility to work with Eugène Scribe. Secret de l’oncle Vincent (music by Lajarte) was quickly followed by the opéra comiques Broskovano, in 2 acts (music by Deffès), les Petits Violons du roi, in 3 acts (music by Deffès) and Madame Grégoire, in 3 acts (music by Clapisson). Then there was Astaroth, one-act opéra comique, (music by Deffès), la Saint-Hubert, one act in verse, presented at the Théâtre de l'Odéon, and eventually his greatest success: les Trois Maupins, four-act comedy, co-written with Scribe and given at the Théâtre du Gymnase.

In less than ten years, Boisseaux, who was Eugène scribe's last collaborator, managed to know success when death prematurely took him at the age of 42 years.

== Sources ==
- L’Illustration, vol.42, Paris, J. Dubochet, 1863, p. 390.
