= Paul Gay =

French opera singer

Paul Gay (born 8 November 1968) is a French bass-baritone who sings opera and other classical forms. He has performed in France, Germany, Russia, and the United States, with a number of significant companies and directors.

Gay's singing as Temrouk in Georges Bizet's Ivan IV was criticized by "Classics Today.com". He showed some early promise, according to auditions. He was termed "a reliable Masetto" in Mozart's Don Giovanni.

Gay has secured some title roles. On 2 February 2008 he appeared on NPR in the title role in Édouard Lalo's The King of Ys. In August 2009, he performed the title role of St. Paul in Felix Mendelssohn's oratorio, St. Paul, with Leon Botstein conducting.

He sang the title role of Enescu's Oedipe in Bucharest and London in 2017 with the London Philharmonic Orchestra under Vladimir Jurowski, and then for the first time on stage at the Bregenz Festival in July 2025 under Hannu Lintu, with "the charisma for the young leader in Acts 2 and 3, also eloquently capturing the character's suffering".
