= Inva Mula =

Albanian soprano

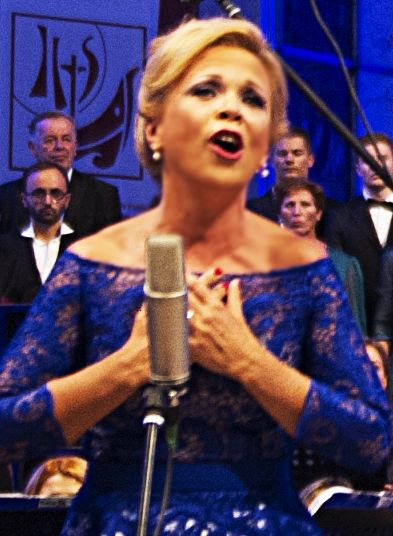
- Born: 27 June 1963 (age 63); Tirana, PR Albania
- Other name: Inva Mula Çako
- Occupation: Operatic lyric soprano
- Years active: 1970s–present
- Parent(s): Avni Mula, Nina Mula
- Awards: Honor of the Nation

Inva Mula is an Albanian opera lyric soprano. She began her soprano career at a very early age. Her father (Avni Mula) and mother (Nina Mula) were also opera singers. She is also known for providing the voice of the diva Plavalaguna in the 1997 film The Fifth Element.

== Early life ==
Inva Mula was born in Tirana, Albania on 27 June 1963, to Avni Mula and Nina Mula. Avni was a Kosovo Albanian man from Gjakova while Nina was a Russian woman from Izhevsk.

== Career ==
In 1987 Mula won the Cantante d'Albania competition in Tirana and in 1988 the George Enescu Competition in Bucharest. In 1992 she won the Butterfly competition in Barcelona. She received an award at Plácido Domingo's first Operalia International Opera Competition in Paris, 1993. A CD of the event was released.

She later performed in various concerts at the Opéra Bastille in Paris, and in Brussels for Europalia Mexico, in Munich, and in Oslo. In 1996 she performed Luigi Cherubini's opera Médée (which was taped for TV) at Compiègne in France. She then returned for Bizet's opera La jolie fille de Perth (released CD, filmed for TV, and released DVD in Japan) in 1998. After this she recorded Puccini's La rondine with Angela Gheorghiu for EMI and for 2005's stage production she took Gheorghiu's place in the leading role of Magda during performances in Toulouse and Paris. Later on, she performed Bizet's Ivan IV concert version, which had its recital debut at Salle Pleyel in Paris, and a live recording was released as CD. In 2001, she was busy in Italy, performing Verdi's Falstaff at the Teatro alla Scala and Rigoletto at the Verona Arena, both of which were taped for TV then released on DVD.

Mula has sung in Lucia di Lammermoor, La bohème, and Manon, among others. She is also a renowned Violetta in La traviata, and has sung the role in many cities around the world, including Tokyo, Bilbao, Orange, Trieste, and Toronto. In 2007, she performed Adina in L'elisir d'amore at Toulouse, and in 2009 she sang the title role in Gounod's Mireille with the Paris Opera at the Palais Garnier, a performance that was issued on DVD. In 2009, she released the album Il Bel Sogno, a compilation of opera arias.

She is often accompanied by the French-Albanian pianist Genc Tukiçi.

Her ex-husband Pirro Çako is a singer and composer from Albania, but she used the spelling Tchako rather than Çako. However, after mid-1990 she began using the name Inva Mula, and never returned to the old one. Her current husband is Hetem Ramadani, a businessman from Kosovo.

=== In film ===
Mula provided singing voice of the Diva Plavalaguna, played on-screen by Maïwenn Le Besco, in the 1997 film The Fifth Element, where she is credited using her then married name as Inva Mula Çako. She performed the aria "Il dolce suono" from the mad scene of Gaetano Donizetti's Lucia di Lammermoor and "The Diva Dance".

== See also ==
- Lists of Albanians
