= List of French singers =

The following is a list of noted French singers.

== A ==
- Myriam Abel
- Georges Aber
- Abyale
- Léon Achard
- Salvatore Adamo (often known as Adamo)
- Adeyto
- Fred Adison
- Isabelle Adjani
- Admiral T
- Martin-Joseph Adrien
- Agustarello Affre
- Sébastien Agius
- Cyrille Aimée
- Aketo (band: Sniper)
- Akhenaton (band: IAM)
- Warda Al-Jazairia
- Adolphe-Joseph-Louis Alizard
- Roberto Alagna
- Frank Alamo
- Henri Albers
- Clarisse Albrecht
- Patrick Alexandroni
- Alexis HK
- Evgueniy Alexiev
- Alice et Moi
- Alizée
- Colette Alliot-Lugaz
- Graeme Allwright
- Alma
- Cyndi Almouzni
- Jenny Alpha
- Mario Altéry
- Essaï Altounian
- Anicée Alvina
- Amélie-les-crayons
- Jérémy Amelin
- Amine
- Constance Amiot
- Marcel Amont
- Norah Amsellem
- Anaïs
- Auguste Andrade
- Eve Angeli
- Martha Angelici
- Angelina
- Anggun (born in Indonesia, with a singing career in France)
- Quynh Anh
- Keren Ann (born in Israel, with a singing career in France)
- Amina Annabi
- Jean-Claude Annoux
- Isabelle Antena
- Richard Anthony
- Marie Antier
- Blanche d'Antigny
- Antoine
- Kareen Antonn
- Jean Aquistapace
- Lucy Arbell
- Luc Arbogast
- Arletty
- Juliette Armanet
- Rosy Armen
- Béatrice Arnac
- Michèle Arnaud
- Yvonne Arnaud
- Carol Arnauld
- Nora Arnezeder
- Sophie Arnould
- Lola Artôt de Padilla
- Marc Aryan
- Aṣa
- Assia (born in Algeria, with a singing career in France)
- Natacha Atlas
- Jean-Louis Aubert (band: Téléphone)
- Jeanne Aubert
- Julie d'Aubigny
- Isabelle Aubret
- Marie Aubry
- Marius-Pierre Audran
- François Audrain
- Hugues Aufray
- Jean-Pierre Aumont
- Antoine Aureche
- Sindy Auvity
- Les Avions
- Margaux Avril
- Zoë Avril
- Jennifer Ayache (band: Superbus)
- Alicia Aylies
- Charles Aznavour
- Abed Azrie

== B ==
- Bach
- Pierre Bachelet
- Gabriel Bacquier
- Chimène Badi
- Vincent Baguian
- Germaine Bailac
- Louisa Baïleche
- Josephine Baker (born in the United States, later became a French citizen)
- Daniel Balavoine
- André Balbon
- William Baldé
- Victoria Balfe
- Suzanne Balguerie
- Jeanne Balibar
- Simone Ballard
- Jean-Luc Ballestra
- Laurent Bàn
- Marie Baptiste
- Barbara
- Didier Barbelivien
- Stanislas de Barbeyrac
- Joseph-Théodore-Désiré Barbot
- Brigitte Bardot
- Aimé Barelli
- Minouche Barelli
- Phil Barney
- Barnolt
- Louis Baron
- Lucien Baroux
- Alain Barrière
- Paul Barroilhet
- Ria Bartok
- Jenifer Bartoli (better known as Jenifer)
- Claude Barzotti
- Alain Bashung
- Jane Bathori
- Charles-Amable Battaille
- Marie Battu
- Axel Bauer
- André Baugé
- Camille Bazbaz
- Angie Be
- Guy Béart
- François Beaumavielle
- Mademoiselle Beaumesnil
- Alex Beaupain
- Gilbert Bécaud
- Hippolyte Belhomme
- Clara Bellar
- Najoua Belyzel
- Ben l'Oncle Soul
- Sonia Ben Ammar
- Bénabar
- Morice Benin
- Denise Benoît
- Jean-Christophe Benoît
- Amel Bent
- François Béranger
- Pierre-Jean de Béranger
- Jane Berbié
- Michel Berger
- Marguerite Bériza
- Gérard Berliner
- Pierre Bernac
- Bernard
- Benjamin Bernheim
- Jocelyne Béroard
- Jac Berrocal
- Berry
- Belle du Berry
- Jean-François Berthelier
- Louis Bertignac
- Liliane Berton
- Claude Bessy
- Jehnny Beth
- Freda Betti
- Priscilla Betti (for children)
- Bibie (born in Ghana, with a singing career in France)
- Bill Baxter
- René Bianco
- Benjamin Biolay
- Ronnie Bird
- Jane Birkin (born in England, with a singing career in France)
- Eugène Bizeau
- Marie Bizet
- David Bizic
- Blacko (band: Sniper)
- Ernest Blanc
- Gérard Blanc
- Frida Boccara
- Richard Bohringer
- Béatrice Bonifassi
- Marc Bonnehée
- Bertrand Bontoux
- Bernie Bonvoisin
- Mathieu Boogaerts
- Irène Bordoni
- Boris
- Jean Borthayre
- Théodore Botrel
- Max Boublil
- Géori Boué
- Zulma Bouffar
- Roger Bourdin
- Amandine Bourgeois
- Max Bouvet
- Hélène Bouvier
- Bourvil
- Jacqueline Boyer
- Lucienne Boyer
- Alexandrine-Caroline Branchu
- Mike Brant (born in Israel, with a singing career in France)
- Georges Brassens
- Paula Brébion
- Georgette Bréjean-Silver
- Jacques Brel (born in Belgium, with a singing career in France)
- Ève Brenner
- Jean Bretonnière
- Françoiz Breut
- Pierre Brice
- Dany Brillant
- Chloé Briot
- Yvonne Brothier
- Zina Brozia
- Aristide Bruant
- Patrick Bruel
- Jacqueline Brumaire
- Sylvie Brunet-Grupposo
- Carla Bruni (born in Italy)
- Charles Burles
- Jean-Jacques Burnel
- Romain Bussine
- René de Buxeuil
- Buzy

== C ==
- Francis Cabrel
- Rita Cadillac
- Françoise Cadol
- Joseph Caillot
- Reda Caire
- Cali
- Calogero
- Isabelle Cals
- Emma Calvé
- Houcine Camara
- Camille
- Canardo
- Amélie-Julie Candeille
- Bertrand Cantat (band: Noir Désir)
- Claudio Capéo
- Jil Caplan
- Victor Capoul
- Ernest Carbonne
- Carlos (for children)
- Eugène Caron
- Michel Caron
- Marguerite Carré
- Léon Carvalho
- Maya Casabianca
- Cécile Cassel
- Armand Castelmary
- Dimie Cat
- Jean Cathala
- Jean-Roger Caussimon
- Marie-Louise Cébron-Norbens
- Angélique Cénas
- Simone Cerdan
- Germaine Cernay
- Cerrone
- Suzanne Cesbron-Viseur
- Anna Chalon
- Alain Chamfort
- François de Chancy
- Julia Channel
- Manu Chao
- Corynne Charby
- Éric Charden (born in Vietnam, with a singing career in France)
- Charly B
- Lyse Charny
- David Charvet
- Philippe Chatel
- Jeremy Chatelain
- Germaine Chaumel
- Guy Chauvet
- Vaimalama Chaves
- Louis Chedid
- Matthieu Chedid
- Georges Chelon
- Marthe Chenal
- Jeanne Cherhal
- Karen Cheryl
- Louise Chevalier
- Maurice Chevalier
- Fred Chichin
- Jean-Baptiste Chollet
- Paulette Christian
- David Christie
- Christophe
- Gina Cigna
- Cyril Cinélu
- Juliette Clarens
- Petula Clark
- Robert Clary
- Zoé Clauzure
- André Claveau
- Philippe Clay
- Coralie Clément
- Edmond Clément
- Willy Clément
- Clémentine
- Julien Clerc
- Maurice Cocagnac
- Richard Cocciante (born in Vietnam, with a singing career in France)
- Coccinelle
- Paul Colline
- Pia Colombo
- Émile Colonne
- Brice Conrad
- Yvonne Constant
- Jean Constantin
- Eddie Constantine
- Cécile Corbel
- Jean-Paul Corbineau
- Annie Cordy (born in Belgium, with a singing career in France)
- Freeze Corleone
- Caroline Costa
- Karine Costa
- Marion Cotillard
- Joseph-Antoine-Charles Couderc
- Simone Couderc
- Robin Coudert
- The Countess
- Nicolas Courjal
- Gaston Couté
- Charlélie Couture
- Laura Cox
- Edith Crash
- Marianne Crebassa
- Régine Crespin
- Nicole Croisille
- Claire Croiza
- Eugène Crosti
- Anaïs Croze
- Pauline Croze
- Chantal Curtis
- Jean Cussac
- Lisandro Cuxi

== D ==
- Da Silva
- Henri-Bernard Dabadie
- Pierre Dac
- Lina Dachary
- Muriel Dacq (born in Belgium, with a singing career in France)
- Dadju
- Étienne Daho
- Dalida (born in Egypt of Italian ancestry, with a singing career in France and worldwide)
- Charles Dalmorès
- Damia
- Lili Damita
- Pascal Danel
- Dani
- Georgie Dann
- Daphné
- Daniel Darc
- Juliette Darcourt
- Lise Darly
- Danielle Darrieux
- Joe Dassin (born in the United States, with a singing career in France)
- Deva Dassy
- Dany Dauberson
- Daubray
- Emma Daumas
- Dave (born in the Netherlands, with a singing career in France)
- F. R. David
- David et Jonathan
- Josette Daydé
- Graziella de Michele
- Gerald De Palmas
- Moune de Rivel
- Linda de Suza
- Marie-Louise Debierre
- Suzette Defoye
- Stéphane Degout
- François Deguelt
- Suzy Delair
- Rose Delaunay
- Clémentine Delauney
- Vincent Delerm
- Bernard Deletré
- Sophie Delila
- Paul Delmet
- Marie Delna
- Jean-François Delmas
- Michel Delpech
- Mireille Delunsch
- Anaïs Delva
- Lucienne Delyle
- Alice Delysia
- Marcelle Demougeot
- Michel Dens
- Willy Denzey
- Xavier Depraz
- Bill Deraime
- Colette Deréal
- Paul Derenne
- Henri-Étienne Dérivis
- Prosper Dérivis
- Anne Victoire Dervieux
- Henri Dès (for children)
- Lea Desandre
- Blanche Deschamps-Jéhin
- Lizzy Mercier Descloux
- Karine Deshayes
- Alexandra Deshorties
- Désiré
- Desireless
- Gaby Deslys
- Marie-Louise Desmatins
- Olivier Despax
- Natalie Dessay
- Marie Devellereau
- Sabine Devieilhe
- David Devriès
- Jennifer Dias
- Dihya
- Louise Dimanche
- Sacha Distel
- Lou Doillon
- Miss Dominique
- Malika Domrane
- Julien Doré
- Benoît Dorémus
- Renée Doria
- René Dorin
- Françoise Dorléac
- Dorothée (for children)
- Elen Dosia
- Gill Dougherty
- André Dran
- Alexandre Dréan
- Jean Dréjac
- Isabelle Druet
- Marie Dubas
- Yvonne Dubel
- Cyrille Dubois
- Maria Duchêne
- Anne Ducros
- Marie-France Dufour
- Clément Duhour
- Jean Dujardin (comic performer and singer)
- Marianne Dujardin
- Odette Dulac
- Caroline Dumas
- Christophe Dumaux
- Dumè
- Louis Gaulard Dumesny
- Jean Dun
- Hector Dupeyron
- Joe Duplantier
- Alexis Dupont
- Daniele Dupre
- Gilbert Duprez
- Yves Duteil
- Jacques Dutronc
- Thomas Dutronc
- Aimé Duval
- Denise Duval
- Edmond Duvernoy

== E ==
- Christiane Eda-Pierre
- Younes Elamine
- Electrosexual
- Elias
- Quentin Elias
- Emmanuelle
- Pierre-Émile Engel
- Léon Escalaïs
- Leny Escudero
- Giani Esposito
- Sofia Essaïdi
- Steeve Estatof
- Pauline Ester
- Anne Etchegoyen

== F ==
- Lara Fabian (born in Belgium, with a singing career in France)
- Chaba Fadela
- Fanny
- Fanny J
- Mylène Farmer
- Faudel
- Jean-Baptiste Faure
- Justine Favart
- Lily Fayol
- Rose Féart
- Rachel Félix
- Meriem Fekkaï
- Marie Fel
- François Feldman
- Fania Fénelon
- Nilda Fernández
- Louise Féron
- Jean Ferrat
- Léo Ferré (born in Monaco, with a singing career in France)
- Nino Ferrer
- Séverine Ferrer
- Ysa Ferrer
- Catherine Ferry
- Alana Filippi
- Patrick Fiori
- Gilles Floro
- Liane Foly
- Brigitte Fontaine
- Guy Fouché
- Tom Frager (born in Senegal, with a singing career in France)
- Fernand Francell
- Jacqueline Francell
- Claude François
- Frédéric François (born Francesco Barracta; also known as François Barra in Sicily, Italy; residing in French-speaking Wallonia, Belgium)
- Jean-Pierre François
- Sandrine François
- Annie Fratellini
- Élodie Frégé
- Yoann Fréget
- Fréhel
- Charles Friant
- Helmut Fritz
- Julie Fuchs
- Michel Fugain
- Lucien Fugère
- Henri Fursy

== G ==
- Jean Gabin
- Léona Gabriel
- Suzanne Gabriello
- Pedro Gailhard
- Philippe Gaillot
- Charlotte Gainsbourg
- Serge Gainsbourg
- Mareva Galanter
- Esther Galil
- France Gall
- Yvonne Gall
- Chantal Gallia
- Delphine Galou
- Henri Garat
- Jean-François Gardeil
- Françoise Garner
- Louis Gassier
- Marie-Thérèse Gauley
- Lys Gauty
- Pierre Gaveaux
- Paul Gay
- Julie Gayet
- Henri Génès
- Véronique Gens
- Carla Georges
- Danyel Gérard
- Jeanne Gerville-Réache
- Baptiste Giabiconi
- Gabrielle Gills
- Cécile Gilly
- Dinh Gilly
- Renée Gilly
- Maître Gims
- Julien Giovannetti
- Kendji Girac
- Yvette Giraud
- Jean Giraudeau
- Alfred Giraudet
- Glenmor
- Dobet Gnahoré
- Raoul de Godewaersvelde
- Géraldine Gogly
- Christina Goh
- Jean-Jacques Goldman
- Claude Got
- Goûts de Luxe
- Chantal Goya (for children)
- Guillaume Grand
- Lillie Grandval
- Juliette Gréco
- Grégoire
- Thierry Grégoire
- Jacques Grello
- Pierre-Eugène Grenier
- Madeleine Grey
- Gribouille
- Laetitia Grimaldi
- Marie Grisier-Montbazon
- Pierre Grivot
- Nora Gubisch
- Nadav Guedj
- Petru Guelfucci
- Georges Guétary
- David Guetta
- Louis Guéymard
- Sébastien Guèze
- Henri Gui
- Georges Guibourg
- Jean Guidoni
- Guilda
- Marie Guilleray
- Damien Guillon
- Andréa Guiot
- Alexandre Guyon
- Youenn Gwernig

== H ==
- Arthur H
- Amir Haddad (better known as Amir)
- Delphine Haidan
- Salim Halali
- Benoît Haller
- Salomé Haller
- Johnny Hallyday
- Maude Harcheb
- Charles Hardouin
- Françoise Hardy
- Raphaël Haroche
- Mireille Hartuch
- Bilal Hassani
- Thierry Hazard
- Hector
- Anna Held
- Helno
- Jacques Herbillon
- René Hérent
- Louise Héritte-Viardot
- Patrick Hernandez
- François-Louis Henry
- Amédée-Louis Hettich
- André Heyboer
- Jacques Higelin
- Jacques Hivert
- Germaine Hoerner
- Mani Hoffman
- Steph Honde
- Hoshi
- Matt Houston
- Gustave Huberdeau
- Hyacinthe

== I ==
- Imany
- Imen Es
- Fabien Incardona
- Indila
- Angélique Ionatos
- Irma
- Isleym
- Jacques Isnardon
- Bera Ivanishvili
- Sebastien Izambard
- Izïa

== J ==
- Jacno
- Gerard Jaffrès
- Soldat Jahman
- Jain
- James BKS
- Jean-Vital Jammes
- Véronique Jannot
- Jacques Jansen
- Agnès Jaoui
- Philippe Jaroussky
- Zizi Jeanmaire
- Pierre Jélyotte
- Jenifer
- C. Jérôme
- Irène Joachim
- Jocelyne Jocya
- Jody
- JoeyStarr (band: NTM)
- Alfred Jolly
- Michel Jonasz
- Joyce Jonathan
- Georges-Alain Jones
- Camélia Jordana
- Jordy (for children)
- Louisy Joseph
- Georges Jouatte
- Marvin Jouno
- Marcel Journet
- Monique Joyce
- Arnaud Joyet
- Anna Judic
- Julia
- Charlotte Julian
- A.-M. Julien
- Jessy Matador
- Juliette
- Jungeli
- Suzanne Juyol

== K ==
- Patricia Kaas
- Anis Kachohi
- Eric John Kaiser
- Kali
- Kam-Hill
- Kamini
- Alain Kan
- Jérémy Kapone
- Anna Kasyan
- Philippe Katerine
- Yianna Katsoulos (born in the United States, with a singing career in France)
- Marina Kaye
- Keen'V
- Claire Keim
- Yann-Fañch Kemener
- Rina Ketty
- Angélique Kidjo
- KidToniK
- Sophie Koch
- Laurent Koehl
- Elisabeth Kontomanou
- Nolwenn Korbell
- Koxie

== L ==
- Anne Chabanceau de La Barre
- Joséphine de La Baume
- Gérard La Viny
- Lââm
- Christophe Lacassagne
- Jean-Pascal Lacoste
- Lafawndah
- Jean-Jacques Lafon
- Marie Laforêt
- Michèle Lagrange
- Étienne Lainez
- Francis Lalanne
- Serge Lama
- Mai Lan
- Albert Lance
- Manon Landowski
- Manu Lanvin
- Ketty Lapeyrette
- Boby Lapointe
- Catherine Lara
- Laroche-Valmont
- Marie-Thérèse Laruette
- Larusso
- Guillemette Laurens
- Rose Laurens
- Damien Lauretta
- Philippe Lavil
- Bernard Lavilliers
- Marc Lavoine
- François Lays
- Carla Lazzari
- Odette Le Fontenay
- Lola Le Lann
- Thierry Le Luron
- Marie Le Rochois
- Amanda Lear (born in Hong Kong, with a singing career in France)
- Maxime Le Forestier
- Jena Lee
- Henri Ledroit
- Caroline Lefebvre
- Edith Lefel
- Claire Lefilliâtre
- Bernard Lefort
- Jules Lefort
- Henri Legay
- Caroline Legrand
- Christiane Legrand
- Joseph Legros
- Camille Lellouche
- Robert Lelièvre
- Grégory Lemarchal
- Catherine-Nicole Lemaure
- Yoann Lemoine
- Meg Lemonnier
- Marcelle Lender
- Gérard Lenorman
- Léonce
- Lionel Leroy
- Nolwenn Leroy
- Leslie
- Gérard Lesne
- Héloïse Letissier
- Nicolas Levasseur
- Rosalie Levasseur
- Daniel Lévi (born in Algeria, with a singing career in France)
- Lily Lian
- Emma Liébel
- Nyco Lilliu
- Pierrick Lilliu
- Lilo
- Margo Lion
- Lisa
- Lissandro
- Liv Del Estal
- Loane
- Caroline Loeb
- Emily Loizeau
- Claudine Longet
- Eva Lopez
- Lorie
- Camille Lou
- Louane
- Pierre Louki
- Israel Lovy
- Jean Loysel
- Germaine Lubin
- José Luccioni
- Luce
- Renan Luce
- Lucenzo
- Sheryfa Luna
- Elsa Lunghini
- Lucien Lupi
- Awa Ly
- Lynnsha

== M ==
- -M-
- Marguerite Macé-Montrouge
- Enrico Macias (born in Algeria, with a singing career in France)
- Mad in Paris
- Madame Acquaire
- Jean-Pierre Mader
- Christophe Maé
- Maëlle
- Magdalith
- Colette Magny
- Brahim Mahrez
- Franca Maï
- Patrice Maktav
- Marie Ortal Malka
- André Mallabrera
- Félicia Mallet
- Malo'
- Yohann Malory
- Mathias Malzieu
- John Mamann
- Cheb Mami
- Houari Manar
- Sara Mandiano
- Liza Manili
- Gérard Manset
- Jeane Manson (born in the United States, with a singing career in France)
- Matteo Manuguerra
- Gilles Marchal
- Guy Marchand
- Blanche Marchesi
- Jean Marco
- Vanni Marcoux
- Guy Mardel
- Clémentine Margaine
- Luis Mariano (born in Spain, with a singing career in France)
- Marie France
- Mécène Marié de l'Isle
- Marie Mariterangi
- Léo Marjane
- Anna Marly
- Lola Marois
- Betty Mars
- Melissa Mars
- Thomas Mars
- Line Marsa
- Jeanne-Marie Marsan
- Claudi Martí
- Maryse Martin
- Germaine Martinelli
- Jean-Pierre Martins
- Mlle Marthe
- Nelly Martyl
- Jeanne Mas
- Abeti Masikini
- Robert Massard
- Annick Massis
- René Massis
- Jean-Étienne-Auguste Massol
- Chiara Mastroianni
- Jessy Matador
- Mireille Mathieu
- Syd Matters
- Marc Mauillon
- Jean-Baptiste Maunier
- Camille Maurane
- Victor Maurel
- Jean-Paul Mauric
- MC Solaar
- Gaëlle Méchaly
- Elli Medeiros
- Henri Médus
- Léon Melchissédec
- Melissa M
- Petite Meller
- Mellowman
- Claude Méloni
- Matthieu Mendès
- Mika Mendes
- Ménélik (born in Cameroon, with a singing career in France)
- Art Mengo
- Henriette Méric-Lalande
- Marcel Merkès
- Anne Meson
- Mady Mesplé
- Sofia Mestari
- Janine Micheau
- Solange Michel
- Mick Micheyl
- Michou
- Sarah Mikovski
- Mily-Meyer
- Miss Ming
- Pierre Mingand
- Jérôme Minière
- Miossec
- Mickaël Miro
- Miranda
- Mirwais
- Miss Kittin
- Mistinguett
- Eddy Mitchell
- Ilona Mitrecey (for children)
- Toussaint-Eugène-Ernest Mocker
- Marie Modiano
- Inna Modja
- Joëlle Mogensen
- Emma Saïd Ben Mohamed
- Emmanuel Moire
- Molinier
- Stéphanie of Monaco (born in Monaco, with a singing career in France)
- Lucile Henriette Mondutaigny
- Claire Monis
- Chloé Mons
- Jeanne de Montagnac
- Gilbert Montagné
- Yves Montand
- Céline Montaland
- Achille-Félix Montaubry
- Édouard Montaubry
- Montrouge
- Monty
- Lova Moor
- Marie Möör
- Moos
- Jacques Morali
- Fanchon Moreau
- Jeanne Moreau
- Éric Morena
- Darío Moreno
- Jean Morère
- Clara Morgane
- Fab Morvan
- Emmanuelle Mottaz
- Pierre Mottron
- Marcel Mouloudji
- Mounqup
- Nana Mouskouri (born in Greece, with a singing career in France and worldwide)
- Georges Moustaki
- Erza Muqoli
- Maria Murano
- Jean-Louis Murat
- Lucien Muratore
- Louis Musy
- Thierry Mutin
- Marie Myriam (born Myriam Lopes in Braga, Portugal, French and Portuguese singer)

== N ==
- Naâman
- Nâdiya
- Yael Naim
- Aya Nakamura
- Laurent Naouri
- Nassi
- Mallaury Nataf
- Native
- Samuel Naumbourg
- Anousha Nazari
- Neige
- Juliette Nesville
- Stéphane Neville
- Philippe Nicaud
- Vincent Niclo
- S Petit Nico
- Dominik Nicolas
- Nicoletta
- Ernesto Nicolini
- Filip Nikolic
- Vera Nimidoff
- Nitta-Jo
- Mélissa Nkonda
- Yannick Noah
- Lobo Nocho
- Magali Noël
- Marjorie Noël
- Louis Noguéra
- Nosfell
- Claude Nougaro
- Pierre Nougaro
- Juliette Noureddine
- Adolphe Nourrit
- Auguste Nourrit
- Louis Nourrit
- Jean-François Novelli
- Ntaba 2 London
- Les Nubians
- Pierre de Nyert
- Nyls
- Bertrand Nzohabonayo

== O ==
- Louis-Henri Obin
- Pascal Obispo
- Clairette Oddera
- Marc Ogeret
- Lewis OfMan
- Marguerite Olagnier
- Olympe
- Marie Oppert
- Orelsan
- Michel Orso
- Marianne Oswald
- Christine Ott
- Thomas Otten
- Ours
- Stéphanie d'Oustrac

== P ==
- Florent Pagny
- Maryse Paillet
- Rudgy Pajany
- Charles Panzéra
- Vanessa Paradis
- Partenaire Particulier
- Jean-Claude Pascal
- Charles Pasi
- Passi
- Thierry Pastor (born in North Africa, with a singing career in France)
- Patachou
- PATjE
- Patric
- Guesch Patti
- Sabine Paturel
- Pauline
- Adrienne Pauly
- Marie Pélissier
- Marie Perbost
- André Perchicot
- André Pernet
- Pierre Perret
- Marie-Jacques Perrier
- Christian Perrin
- Mimi Perrin
- George Perris
- Paul Personne
- Noémie Pérugia
- Auguste Jacques Étienne Peschard
- Peter & Sloane
- Patricia Petibon
- Mélissa Petit born 1990, opera singer
- Nicolas Peyrac
- Jean Philippe
- Édith Piaf
- Sandrine Piau
- Raphaël Pichon
- Anne Pigalle
- Jacques Pills
- Robert Pizani
- Pol Plançon
- Benoît Poher (band: Kyo)
- M. Pokora
- Polaire
- Françoise Pollet
- Michel Polnareff
- Claire Pommet (Known as Pomme)
- Tony Poncet
- Antoine Ponchard
- Lily Pons
- Jacques Pottier
- Virginie Pouchain
- Camille Poul
- Isabelle Poulenard
- Princess Erika
- Barbara Pravi
- Gogol Premier
- Ferdinand Prévôt
- Alice Prin
- Yvonne Printemps
- Xavier Privas
- Melody Prochet
- Gilbert Py

== Q ==
- Jakie Quartz
- Clémence Quélennec
- Marie-Anne-Catherine Quinault
- Vanessa Quinones

== R ==
- R.wan
- Biga Ranx
- Jeanne Raunay
- Mickels Réa
- Arnaud Rebotini
- Rahim Redcar
- Serge Reggiani (born in Italy, with a singing career in France)
- Régine (born in Belgium, with a singing career in France)
- Nadine Renaux
- Colette Renard
- Renaud
- Lilian Renaud
- Line Renaud
- Rose Renaud
- Axelle Renoir
- Louis Benoît Alphonse Révial
- Fanély Revoil
- Colonel Reyel
- Nell Reymond
- Serge Rezvani
- Jane Rhodes
- Catherine Ribeiro
- Louis-Augustin Richer
- Ridan (legal name Nadir Kouidri)
- Ridsa
- Nicolas Rigas
- Rilès
- Merwan Rim
- Cheikha Rimitti
- Gérard Rinaldi
- Catherine Ringer
- Léo Rispal
- Gabrielle Ritter-Ciampi
- Colette Ritz
- Dick Rivers
- Stéphan Rizon
- Mado Robin
- Sébastien Roch
- Pierre Roche
- Pierre Rochefort
- Germaine Roger
- Hélène Rollès
- Louis-Jacques Rondeleux
- Christine Roque
- Gustave-Hippolyte Roger
- Françoise Rosay
- Rose
- Tino Rossi
- Léon Rothier
- Gaëtan Roussel
- Michel Roux
- Jacqueline Royer
- Olivia Ruiz
- Clotilde Rullaud
- Philippe Russo

== S ==
- Germaine Sablon
- Jean Sablon
- Lætitia Sadier
- Damien Saez
- Zaho de Sagazan
- Janis Sahraoui
- Mathilde Saïman
- Patrick Saint-Éloi
- Marguerite de Saint-Marceaux
- Clémence Saint-Preux
- Charles-Louis Sainte-Foy
- Henri Salvador
- Kayna Samet
- Cindy Sander
- Véronique Sanson
- Santa
- Arno Santamaria
- Nathalie Santamaria
- Sapho
- Théo Sarapo
- Fernand Sardou
- Michel Sardou
- Megumi Satsu
- Émilie Satt, lead vocalist of Madame Monsieur
- Catherine Sauvage
- Bernard Sauvat
- Vivien Savage
- Charlotte Savary
- Émile Scaremberg
- Denise Scharley
- Jeanne-Charlotte Schroeder
- Sébastien Schuller
- Patrick Sebastien
- Hélène Ségara
- Emmanuelle Seigner
- Amira Selim
- Florian Sempey
- Michel Sénéchal
- Émilienne de Sère
- David Serero
- Gérard Serkoyan
- Séverine
- Pascal Sevran
- Sexion d'Assaut
- Ramses Shaffy
- Shake
- Shmuel Shapiro
- Emma Shapplin
- Sheila
- William Sheller
- Kool Shen (band: NTM)
- Laetitia Shériff
- Shona
- Mort Shuman
- Shurik'n (band: IAM)
- Shy'm
- Madeleine Sibille
- Antoine Sicot
- Benjamin Siksou
- Émilie Simon
- Yves Simon
- Juliette Simon-Girard
- Simon-Max
- Albin de la Simone
- Bernard Sinclair
- Martial Singher
- Singuila
- Nicola Sirkis (band: Indochine)
- Slaï
- Slimane
- Soan
- Sofiane
- Soko
- MC Solaar (born in Senegal, with a singing career in France)
- Suzy Solidor
- Mano Solo
- Martin Solveig
- Dominic Sonic
- Sophie-Tith
- Alain Souchon
- Gabriel Soulacroix
- Soumia
- Raymond Souplex
- Gérard Souzay
- Roger Soyer
- Natasha St-Pier (born in New Brunswick, Canada, with a singing career in France)
- Stacy
- Stanislas
- Amanda Strang
- Stromae Belgian singer-songwriter
- Nathalie Stutzmann
- Karoline Rose SUN
- Linda de Suza (born Teolinda Joaquina de Souza Lança in Portugal, with a singing career in both France and Portugal)
- Suzane
- Claude Sylvain
- Anne Sylvestre

== T ==
- Spill Tab
- Jacqueline Taïeb
- Jocelyne Taillon
- Taïro
- Tal
- Jean-Alexandre Talazac
- Tancrède
- Sophie Tapie
- Félicien Taris
- Émile-Alexandre Taskin
- Jean Tatlian
- Lise Tautin
- Henri Tayau
- Tayc
- Izé Teixeira
- Sébastien Tellier
- Nicolas Testé
- Tété
- Fursy Teyssier
- Ludovic Tézier
- Allan Théo
- Louise Théo
- Gabriel-Vincent Thévenard
- Élisabeth Thible
- Hubert-Félix Thiéfaine
- Georges Thill
- Eustase Thomas-Salignac
- Tiborg
- Yann Tiersen
- Ana Tijoux
- Anne Tilloy
- Mina Tindle
- Marie-Ange Todorovitch
- Axel Tony
- Damien Top
- Patrick Topaloff
- Michèle Torr
- Geneviève Touraine
- Élisa Tovati
- Roger Toziny
- Irène de Trebert
- Charles Trénet
- Antoine Trial
- Étienne Troy
- Auguste Tuaillon
- Afida Turner
- Tyssem

== U ==
- Uffie (born in the United States, with a singing career in France)
- Delphine Ugalde
- Georges Ulmer
- Béatrice Uria-Monzon
- Joëlle Ursull

== V ==
- Magalie Vaé
- Marguerite Vaillant-Couturier
- Sylvie Valayre
- Valentina
- François Valéry
- Ninon Vallin
- Alain Vanzo
- Sylvie Vartan
- Amaury Vassili
- Pierre Vassiliu
- Eugène Vauthier
- Vegastar
- Vegedream
- Nino Vella
- Jacques Veneruso
- Eugénie Vergin
- Edmond Vergnet
- Louise Verneuil
- César Vezzani
- Boris Vian
- Vianney
- Elizabeth Vidal
- Cloé Vidiane
- Jean Vieuille
- Hervé Vilard
- Marie de Villepin
- Jacques Villisech
- Maria Vincent
- Saint Vincent
- Dominique Visse
- Vitaa
- Geneviève Vix
- Jean-Paul Volnay
- Laurent Voulzy

== W ==
- Wallen
- Émile Wartel
- François Wartel
- Wejdene
- Barbara Weldens
- WeRe-VaNa
- Noé Willer
- Christophe Willem (born Christophe Durier)
- Noé Willer
- Willy William
- Ophélie Winter
- Mark Wirtz
- Janet Woollacott

== Y ==
- Rachel Yakar
- Yamê
- Jean Yanne
- Ycare
- Yelle
- Tiny Yong
- Marten Yorgantz
- Michaël Youn (comic performer and singer; band: Fatal Bazooka)
- Yseult

== Z ==
- Zaho (born in Algeria)
- Hindi Zahra
- Zaz
- Zazie
- Chiara Zeffirelli
- Alexandre Zelkine
- Julie Zenatti
- Alice Zeppilli
- Qiulin Zhang
- Emmanuelle Zoldan
- Zouzou (born in Algeria, with a singing career in France)
- Régine Zylberberg

== See also ==
- List of French people
- List of singer-songwriters
- Lists of musicians
