= Michou =

Michou may refer to:

- Affectionate form of names such as Michel or Micheline
- Michou (cabaret artist) (1931–2020), French cabaret owner, drag queen and singer
- Michou (Réunion singer) (born 1960), Réunionnaise female singer
- Michou (band), Canadian folk band 2007–2012
- Michelle Dumon (1921–2017), WWII Belgian resistance agent who used the codename "Michou"
