= Partenaire Particulier =

French pop group

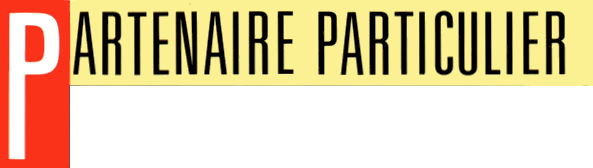

Background information
- Origin: Bordeaux, France
- Genres: Pop, new wave
- Years active: 1983–1989, 2006–present
- Labels: Chris' Music
- Members: Eric Fettweis
- Past members: Pierre Béraud-Sudreau; Dominique Delaby; Laurent Le Trillard
- Website: partenaireparticulier.com

Partenaire Particulier (French pronunciation: [paʁtənɛʁ paʁtikylje]) is a French pop, electronic, and new wave band from Bordeaux whose popularity peaked in the mid-1980s. It was formed by Eric Fettweis, Pierre Béraud-Sudreau, and Dominique Delaby. Three of their singles were ranked on the SNEP chart (top 50), including their signature song, "Partenaire Particulier".

They stopped releasing albums in 1989, although they produced records in the early 1990s using different pseudonyms. The group made a comeback in 2006 with Fettweis and Béraud-Sudreau and began writing a new album, though creative differences led to Béraud-Sudreau's departure, leaving Fettweis as the sole permanent member of the band. He released Geek in 2011, and a decade later, followed it with Qu'allons-nous devenir ? as well as Nuits particulières, a collaborative album with former Les Avions vocalist and guitarist Jean-Pierre Morgand.

== Band members ==
Current

- Eric Fettweis (1983–present)

Past

- Dominique Delaby (1983–1986)
- Pierre Béraud-Sudreau (1984–2009)
- Laurent Le Trillard (1986)

== Discography ==
Albums

- Jeux interdits (1986)
- Le Chant des vautours (1988)
- The Very Best Of (1993)
- Collection légende (1998)
- Partenaire Particulier : le son des années 80 (2008)
- Geek (2011)
- Qu'allons-nous devenir ? (2021)
- Nuits particulières (with Jean-Pierre Morgand) (2021)

Singles

- "Partenaire Particulier" / "Partenaire Particulier" (instrumental remix) (1985)
- "Je n'oublierai jamais" / "Une Autre Nuit" (1986)
- "Elle est partie" / "Elle n'aimait pas les garçons" (1987)
- "Tiphaine" / "Le Regard fier" (1987)
- "L'Armée" / "Le Rire de Sidonie" (1988)
- "L'Amour à trois" / "Non !" (1989)
- "Effigie" / "Planet B." (2011)
- "Pourrir en enfer" (with Angie Doll) (2011)

Other releases

- "Hypnoteck" (as DK Dance) (1990)
- "Din Da Dance" (as Biz'Art) (1990)
- "It's a lot" (as DK Dance) (1991)
