= Bill Deraime =

French blues singer

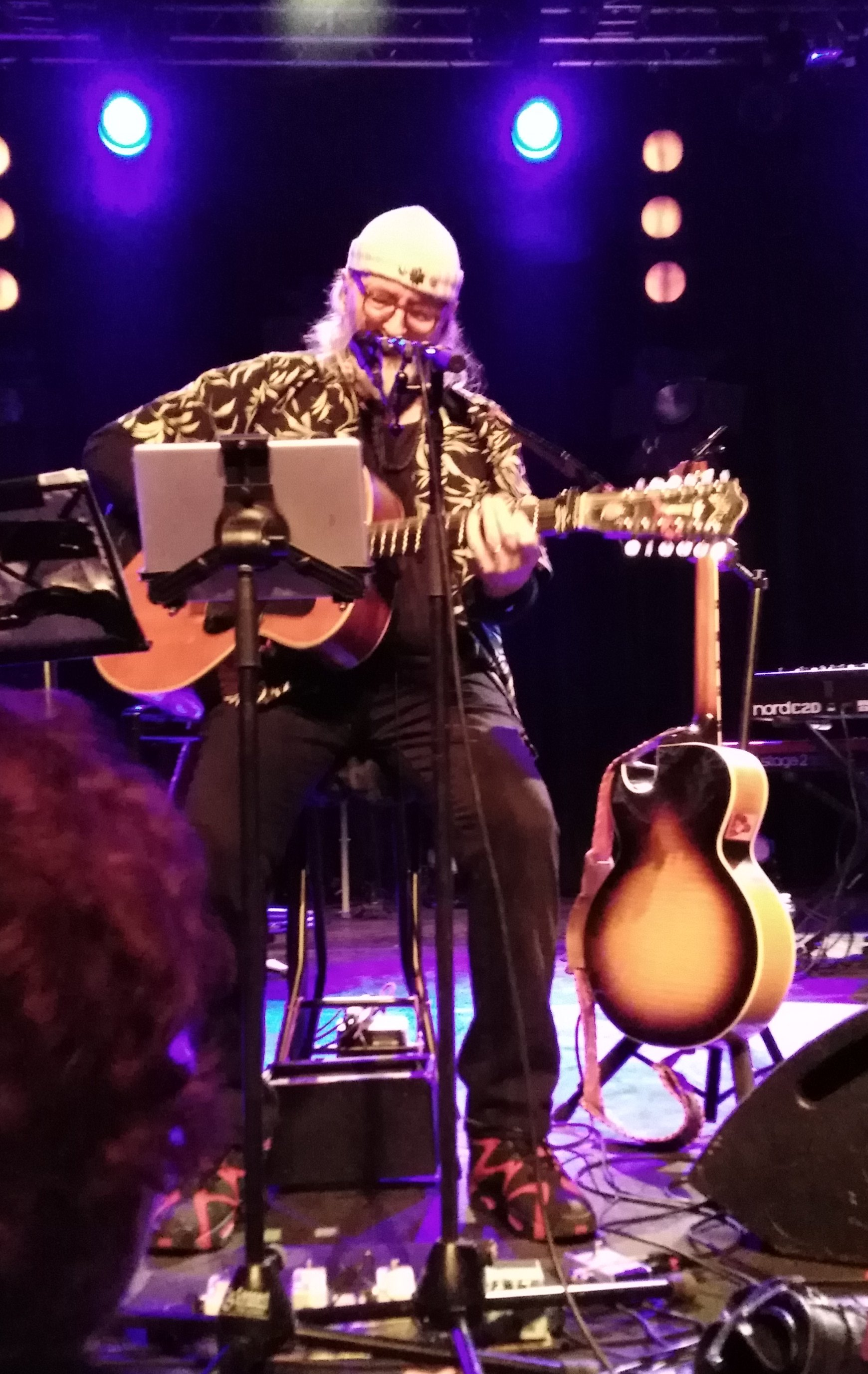
Bill Deraime en concert au Salaise Blues Festival

Alain "Bill" Deraime is a French blues singer (born 2 February 1947 in Senlis, Oise).

== Discography ==
- Bill Deraime (LP - 1979)
- Plus la peine de frimer (LP - 1980)
- Qu'est-ce que tu vas faire ? (LP - 1981)
- Entre deux eaux (LP - 1982)
- Live Olympia (Live LP - 1983)
- Fauteuil piégé (LP - 1984)
- Énergie positive (LP - 1985)
- La Porte (LP - 1987)
- Toujours du bleu (CD - 1989) with "Sur le bord de la route" French cover of (Sittin' On) The Dock of the Bay (Otis Redding - Steve Cropper).
- Mister Blues (compilation - 1990)
- Louisiane (CD - 1991)
- Live (live CD - 1993)
- Tout recommençait (CD - 1994)
- Avant la paix (CD - 1999)
- C'est le monde (CD - 2000)
- Quelque part (CD - 2004)
- Live au New Morning (live CD - 2005)
- Bouge encore (CD - 2008)
- Brailleur de fond (CD - 2010)
- Après demain (CD - 2013)
- Nouvel horizon (CD - 2018)
- Nouvel horizon Vol.2 (CD - 2021)

== See also ==
- List of French singers
