= Liv Del Estal =

French singer and actress

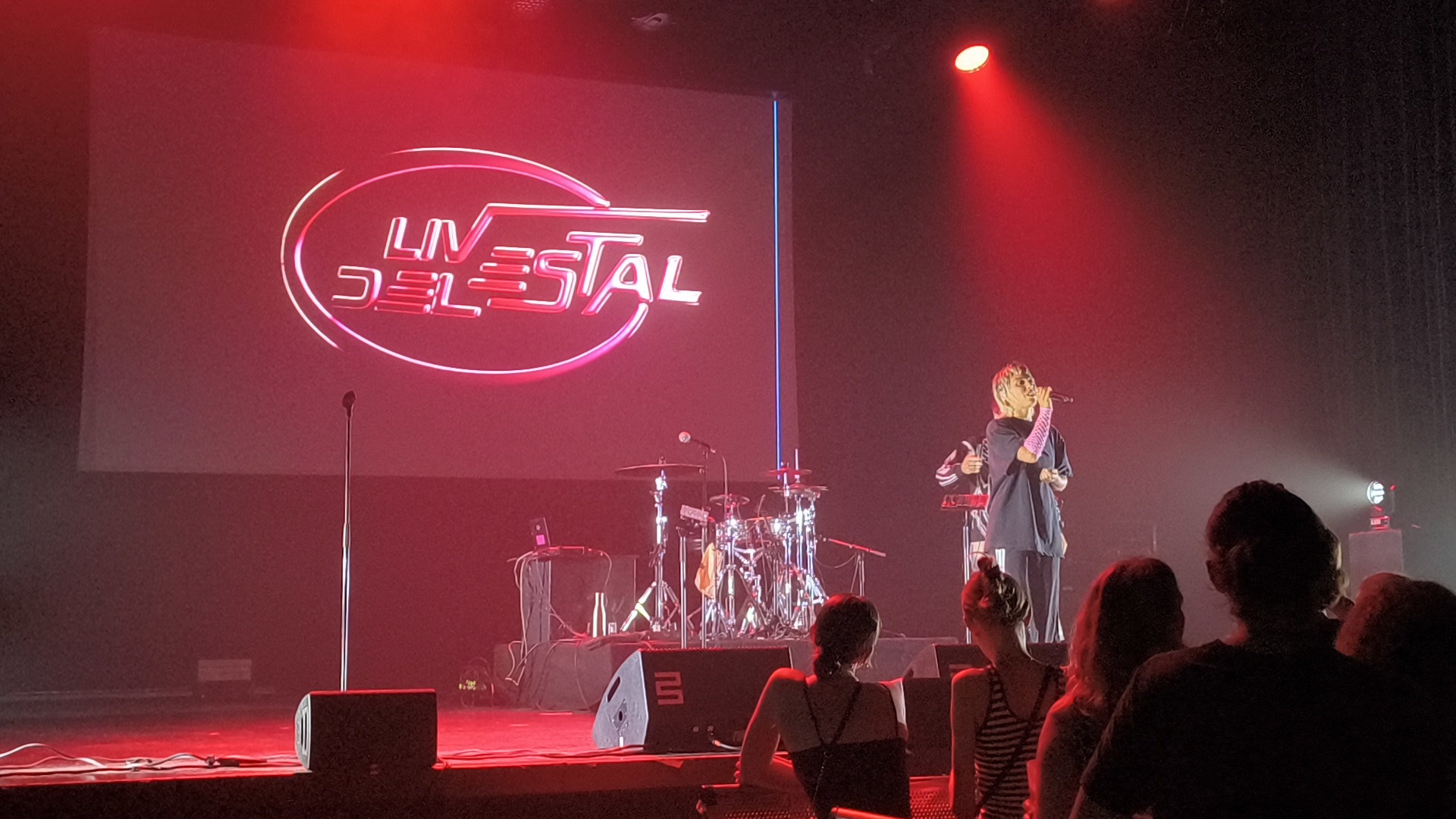
- Liv Del Estal at a Nancy concert in 2025
- Born: 14 January 1996 (age 30); Paris, France
- Occupation: Singer Actor
- Style: French pop

Liv Del Estal, born on 14 January 1996 in Paris, is a French singer and actress.

Liv Del Estal, the daughter of French actor Stéphane Freiss and an Argentinian mother, evolved in the artistic world from a young age and developed a passion for singing. She trained in dance, singing and theater at the International Academy. It was in 2018 that she became known to the general public, by participating in the Season 7 of The Voice: la plus belle voix on TF1 in Zazie's team. She was eliminated in the 13th week of the competition, just before the quarter-finals.

Spotted by the Decca Records France label, she signed a contract with Universal Music in 2019 and released her first track "Devant le cinéma". At the same time, she joined the talents of the VMA artistic agency, represented by Bertrand de Labbey. She landed her first roles in the TF1 series Le juge est une femme and H24. She also plays the character of Louise in the series Validé by Franck Gastambide on Canal+, and participates in the soundtrack with the song "Follow". In 2020, she joined the cast of the series Une si longue nuit and in 2021 released her first EP: ma vie en vrac.

== Discography ==
Albums

- ma vie en vrac: 2021
- Encore: 2022

Singles

- "Devant le cinéma – Version acoustique": 2020
- "La Première Fois": 2021
- "Ma vie": 2022
- "Amour scandaleux": 2024

== Filmography ==
Television

- Le juge est une femme: 2019
- H24: 2019
- Validé: 2019
- Une si longue nuit: 2020
- Raw Memories: 2023
