= Angélique Cénas =

French actor and opera singer

Angélique Cénas, stage name Mademoiselle Cénas (c. 1757–fl. 1790), was a French stage actress and opera singer.

She was born to the French actress Barbe Marguerite Henry and the French silk merchant Jean-Baptiste Coudurier. In 1770, she took the name of her stepfather, the balett dancer Gaspard Cénas. In 1781, she married the French opera singer Pierre-Henri de Moulinneuf ('Montroze').

She was born in Stockholm in Sweden, were her mother and stepfather was engaged at the Swedish royal court theatre.

She made her debut as a child at the Du Londel Troupe, where she was engaged until 1771. She left Sweden with her family when the French theater were dissolved by king Gustav III of Sweden.

Angélique Cénas performed heroine parts in both comedy and tragedy, and was also an opera singer. She toured with her mother and sister in The Netherlands, the Austrian Netherlands and France with success. She was engaged as first premier opera primadonna and soubrette at the Théâtre de la Monnaie of Brussels between 1779 and 1783. She performed at both Théâtre-Italien and Comédie-Française in Paris in 1783, and was engaged at the French theatre in Amsterdam between 1784 and 1787. She was engaged at Liège in 1788-1790.
