= Goûts de Luxe =

- Origin: France
- Genres: Pop
- Years active: 1986–1989
- Website: Official site

Goûts de Luxe was a French group from Brest, founded by Jacques le Honsec (1963) and Jean-Éric Montfort.

== Biography ==
The name of the group was found during a Chanel parade.

Jacques Honsec's employment in the record industry allowed him to meet producers in Paris. Thus, a contract was signed. But while recording the first single, "Les Yeux de Laura", Jean-Éric Montfort was unable to record the parts played on guitar. A studio musician, Kamil Rustam, did it. As a result, Montfort decided to refuse promoting the single as he did not play on it and left the group. In the meantime, Marianna Kliska, who had married Jacques le Honsec, replaced the guitarist.

"Les Yeux de Laura", whose cover was reprinted because of the change of band's composition, hit #24 in the French SNEP Singles Chart. A maxi vinyl was remixed by Dimitri from Paris. Goûts de Luxe recorded a second single, "Omaha Beach", but it was unsuccessful.

After changing labels, the group recorded a final single, "Dans un autre pays", which was a very minor success, then the group split up.

== Discography ==
=== Singles ===
- 1986 : "Les Yeux de Laura" / "Les Yeux de Laura" (instrumental version)
- 1987 : "Omaha Beach" / "Ubik" / Cover version of "Fade to Grey"
- 1989 : "Dans un autre pays" / "Last Train"

=== Collaborations ===
- 1988 : 75 Artistes pour le Liban
