= Abyale =

Franco-African dance music singer

Abyale is a Franco-African dance music singer who had success in the 1990s. Her first chart "I Wanna Be Your Lover too" stayed 34 weeks in the French Dance Charts and her song "I Don't Talk about Love" was a hit in France too (#28 on the French SNEP Singles Chart). She stopped her career for a while in 1995 when she had a son, then participated in TV adverts and music of opening credits for series. Her second album was then released in 2009.

She is a member of "les Reines de Saba", a vocal quartet. Universal Music considered her "one of the new divas of the dance new soul".

== Discography ==
=== Albums ===
- 1993 : Nightbuzz
- 2009 : A Shade of Blue
- 2012 : Soul Train
- 2020 : Wax

=== Singles ===
- 1990 : "I Wanna Be Your Lover Too"
- 1991 : "I don't talk about L.O.V.E." – #28 in France
- 1992 : "A Kiss from Paris"
- 1992 : "The Snooker"
- 1993 : "I Wanna Find Somebody"
