= H24 (TV series) =

- Country of origin: France
- Original language: French
- No. of series: 1
- No. of episodes: 25

Production
- Running time: 4 minutes

Original release
- Release: 21 October 2021

H24 - 24 heures dans la vie d'une femme is a series of 25 short film dramas, written by 25 female writers and shot with 25 different actresses. The subject matter of each episodes is about domestic violence against women.

== Episodes ==
#	Title	Director	Starring
1	"07H - Signes"	Nora Fingscheidt	Diane Kruger
2	"08H - 10 cm au-dessus du sol"	Nathalie Masduraud & Valérie Urréa	Souheila Yacoub
3	"09H - Revenge porn"	Nathalie Masduraud & Valérie Urréa	Elina Löwensohn
4	"10H - Concerto #4"	Clémence Poésy	Céleste Brunnquell
5	"11H - Avis d'expulsion"	Nathalie Masduraud & Valérie Urréa	Marilyne Canto
6	"12H - Le cri défendu"	Charlotte Abramow	Déborah Lukumuena
7	"13H - Mon harceleur"	Nathalie Masduraud & Valérie Urréa	Charlotte De Bruyne
8	"14H - Je serai reine"	Nathalie Masduraud & Valérie Urréa	Anaïs Demoustier
9	"15H - Gloss"	Marie-Castille Mention-Schaar	Tallulah Burns
10	"16H - Terminal F"	Nathalie Masduraud & Valérie Urréa	Annabelle Lengronne
11	"17h - PLS"	Nathalie Masduraud & Valérie Urréa	Noémie Merlant
12	"18H - Je brûle"	Ariane Labed	Valeria Bruni Tedeschi
13	"19H - Le chignon"	Nathalie Masduraud & Valérie Urréa	Kayije Kagame
14	"20H - Ligne de touche"	Nathalie Masduraud & Valérie Urréa	Garance Marillier
15	"21H - Les détails"	Nathalie Masduraud & Valérie Urréa	Sveva Alviti
16	"22H - Fan zone"	Elsa Amiel	Florence Loiret Caille
17	"23H - Nuit rouge"	Émilie Brisavoine	Camille Cottin
18	"00H - Elle sera belle"	Nathalie Masduraud & Valérie Urréa	Grace Seri
19	"01H - Under control"	Nathalie Masduraud & Valérie Urréa	Galatéa Bellugi
20	"02H - Fantôme"	Nathalie Masduraud & Valérie Urréa	Romane Bohringer
21	"03H - Dommage!"	Nathalie Masduraud & Valérie Urréa	Susana Abaitua
22	"04H - Emprise"	Nathalie Masduraud & Valérie Urréa	Luàna Bajrami
23	"05H - Quinze ans"	Nathalie Masduraud & Valérie Urréa	Aloïse Sauvage
24	"06H - Ça c'est mon corps"	Nathalie Masduraud & Valérie Urréa	Agnieszka Zulewska
25	"La 25e heure - Nina"	Sandrine Bonnaire	Nadège Beausson-Diagne

== Reception ==
The show was criticised for not doing episodes about Muslims or sex workers.
