= PATjE =

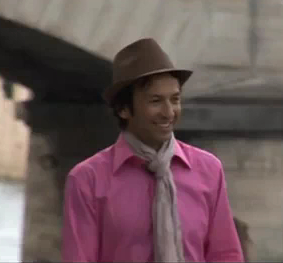
- PATjE during his Flashmob in Paris in 2010

Background information
- Born: Patrice Jauffret
- Genres: Pop; Rock; Bossanova
- Occupation(s): Singer, songwriter, musician
- Website: www.patje.net

PATjE (born Patrice Jauffret) is a French singer.

== Life and career ==
Born in Geneva, Switzerland, he was raised in Marseille, Barcelona, and Geneva. His first experience in entertainment was theater, which he became passionate about when he was fourteen.

After his high school diploma he did his Bachelors in America to improve his language skills. At that time his friends gave him the nickname PATJE (diminutive of Pat). Returning to Europe, he worked in advertising and became the editor of a magazine. When he left this multinational firm, he moved to Barcelona, Spain, in order to study at university, his love for entertainment and music came back into his life. In 2000 he went to Los Angeles.

Between 2002 and 2005 he started playing with his band in clubs and international festivals around Los Angeles and released his first digital single between 2005 and 2006.

With his first album in 2005 he launched his career in French, English and Spanish. His international success began in 2009 with Pasaporte, his second album in Spanish and English, and his single GOGO (versión español) ranked 34th on the top 40 of the Billboard Tropical charts

In May 2010 he organised à Flashmob to promote his song (GOGO (remix) in Paris. On 22 October 2010, PATjE became the first artist to launch his own digital radio station on the apple App Store PATjE.fm.

== Discography – albums ==
- 2009 : Pasaporte
