= Lyse Charny =

French opera singer

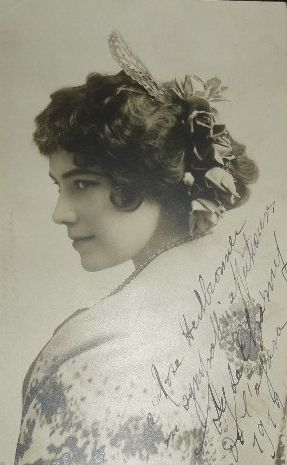
- Born: 1890
- Died: 1950 (aged 59–60)
- Occupation: opera singer
- Years active: 1910-1950

Lyse Charny (1890–1950) was a French contralto opera singer who made her début at the Paris Opera in 1910 in the ballet Les Bacchantes. She went on to become a celebrated performer there, playing Erda in Wagner's Niebelungenring and Uta in Ernest Reyer's Sigurd. She also appeared at the Opéra-Comique, where she first performed as Carmen in July 1919.

== Biography ==
Charny made her début at the Paris Opera in 1910, performing in the vocal part of Les Bacchantes. She remained there for many years, taking roles such as Erda in the Nibelungenring, Uta in Ernest Reyer's Sigurd, the Queen in Ambroise Thomas' Hamlet, Magdalene in Die Meistersinger von Nürnberg, Emilia in Verdi's Otello, Amneris in Aida, Dalida in Saint-Saëns' Samson et Dalila and the title role in Jules Massenet's Hérodiade. In 1923, she played Marthe in the French première of Mussorgsky's Khovanshchina.

She first played at the Opéra-Comique in July 1919 as Carmen and went on to play Charlotte in Massenet's Werther, Taven in Gounod's Mireille and Marceline in Alfred Bruneau's L'attaque du moulin. On 10 May 1922, she created the roles of Kallista and Julie in the première of Henri Busser's Les noces corinthiennes. She appeared in Brussels at the Théâtre de la Monnaie in 1913 and 1924 and at Rome's Teatro Costanzi in 1916 as Dalida.

Lyse Charny died in 1950. Her voice has been favourably compared to that of her predecessor Marie Delna.
