= Marie-Louise Debierre =

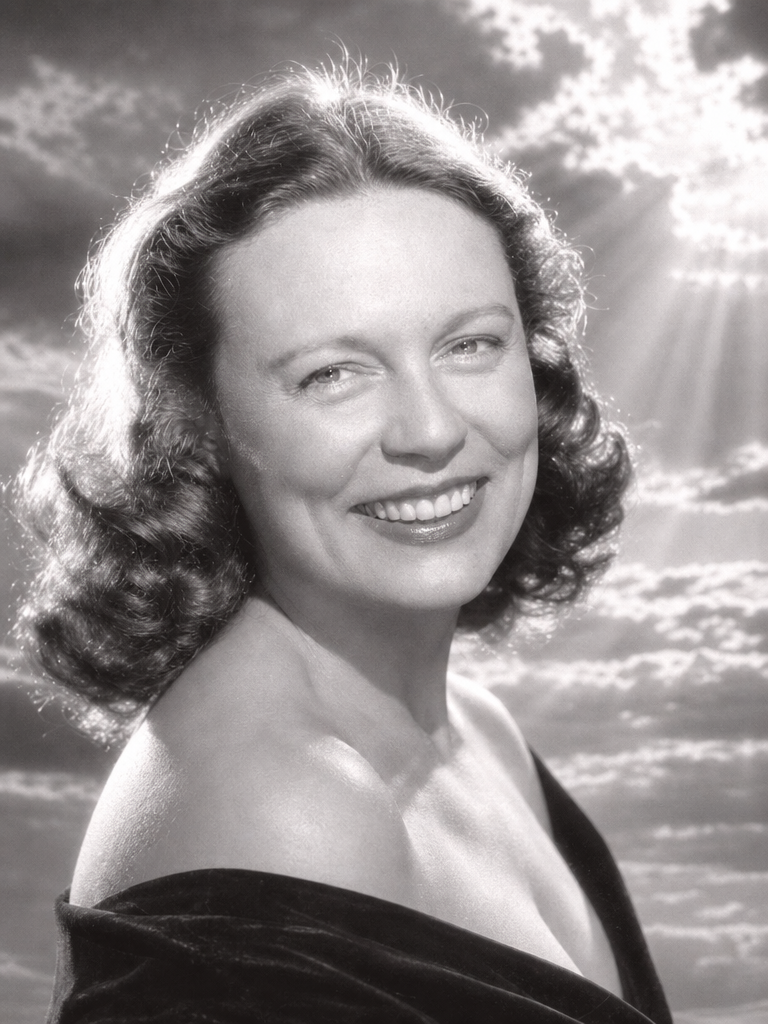
- Marie-Louise Debierre at the age of 42
- Born: 31 January 1910; Paris, France
- Died: 15 October 1988 (aged 78); Gaillon, France
- Occupations: Opera singer, Falcon soprano
- Years active: 1932–1958

Marie-Louise Debierre, born on 31 January 1910 in Paris and died on 15 October 1988 in Gaillon, was a French opera singer, mezzo-soprano and contralto.

Active during the 1940s and 1950s, she pursued a career at the Paris Opera, the Opéra-Comique, as well as on French and international opera stages. She became distinguished in dramatic roles from the French, Italian and Wagnerian repertoire, performing in Bordeaux, Lille, Lyon, Nancy, Nice, Algiers, Tunis and Barcelona.

== Biography ==
Born into a modest family, Marie-Louise Debierre began working at the age of fourteen for the Maison Pouyanne luxury dye works before studying singing under Eugène Marcel Picheran, former chorus master of the Opéra-Comique, Salle Favart. Before making her professional debut, she appeared under the stage name Mme Pradat. In November 1932, she performed works by Léo Delibes and Alexandre Georges during a charity event organized in Paris's 14th arrondissement.

In June 1933, she performed the role of Mme Duponceau in Premier prix de piano, a one-act comedy by Eugène Labiche and Alfred Delacour.

On 31 January 1941, she joined the chorus of the Paris Opera. In 1946, she left the Paris Opera chorus to be a soloist at the Grand Théâtre de Bordeaux.

In 1951, she was engaged for solo roles at the Paris Opera under the direction of Georges Hirsch. She is listed in the Encyclopédie des Cantatrices de l'Opéra Garnier de Paris.

She took vocal training under the tenor and singing teacher Georges Jouatte. After 1960, she ended her operatic career and retrained in the fields of social assistance and personal care.

== Career ==
=== Debut at the Opéra-Comique in Paris ===
On 3 February 1943, at Villiers-sur-Marne, Marie-Louise Debierre performed her first leading role, Toinette in Le Chemineau by Xavier Leroux. The title role of the Wayfarer was performed by her singing teacher Eugène Picheran, former chorus master of the Opéra-Comique.

On 28 February 1948, Marie-Louise Debierre made her debut at the Opéra-Comique in the role of the Mother in Louise by Gustave Charpentier, conducted by André Cluytens. She subsequently performed this role on several occasions, notably alongside baritone André Pernet in the role of the Father.

Marie-Louise Debierre is listed in the Encyclopédie des Cantatrices de l'Opéra-Comique.

=== Debut in the Paris Opera Chorus ===
On 2 June 1945, she made her debut at the Paris Opera in a performance of Pénélope by Gabriel Fauré.

Following the Liberation of Paris in August 1945, she performed La Marseillaise and patriotic songs on a stage erected in front of the Hôtel de Ville in duet with Charles Cambon, accompanied by the Paris Opera Orchestra and Chorus.

=== Grand Théâtre de Bordeaux ===
From 1945 onward, Marie-Louise Debierre was engaged by the Grand Théâtre de Bordeaux, where she performed several leading roles from the French and Wagnerian repertoire.

She notably sang Fricka in Die Walküre, a role in which critics praised the quality of her diction, the warmth of her voice and her dramatic abilities.

On 26 November 1946, she performed Dulcinea in Don Quichotte.

On 22 January 1947, she performed the role of Gertrude, Queen of Denmark and Hamlet's mother, in Hamlet.

On 17 May 1947, she performed the title role in Hérodiade.

=== Paris Opera ===
At the Paris Opera, she appeared in numerous productions from the French, Italian and German repertoires. Her roles included Dame Marthe in Faust, Gertrude (Juliet's Nurse) in Roméo et Juliette, Giovanna (sometimes spelled Johanna) in Rigoletto, and Schwertleite in Die Walküre.

During the 1951–1952 season at the Paris Opera, she performed the role of Schwertleite in Die Walküre, with Suzanne Juyol as Brünnhilde, under the baton of conductor André Cluytens.

=== Nancy, Lyon and Tunis ===
On 15 February 1950, she performed Ortrud in Lohengrin at the Grand Théâtre de Nancy, alongside Régine Crespin as Elsa of Brabant.

On 16 October 1950, she performed Margared in Le Roi d'Ys at the Grand Théâtre of Saint-Quentin.

On 29 and 30 November 1950, she performed the Mother in Louise at the Grand Théâtre of Tourcoing.

On 12 January 1951, she sang Amneris in Aida at the Opéra de Lyon.

On 24 January 1951, she performed Mallika in Lakmé at the Municipal Theatre of Calais, followed by performances at the Monsigny Municipal Theatre in Boulogne-sur-Mer and the Municipal Theatre of Lille.

On 16 and 18 October 1951, she performed Dame Marthe in Faust at the Municipal Opera of Algiers.

=== Marseille ===
In 1951, she performed the role of the Nurse in Boris Godunov at the Opéra municipal de Marseille, Toinette in Le Chemineau at the Municipal Theatre of Tourcoing, and Ortrud in Lohengrin at the Lyon Opera. In November 1951, she once again performed Amneris in Aida at the Grand Théâtre de Nancy and she repeated the role at the Théâtre municipal de Tunis, where the press praised the dramatic power of her interpretation.

=== Lille ===
She appeared in the Opéra de Lille programme for the 1951–1952 season.

On 13 December 1951, she performed Delilah in Samson et Delilah.

On 17 January 1952, she performed the title role in Hérodiade.

On 21 January 1952, she performed Ortrud in Lohengrin at the Eden Theatre in Saint-Étienne.

On 21 February 1952, she sang Margared in Le Roi d'Ys at the Lille Opera.

=== Nice ===
At the Nice Opera, on 6 and 8 March 1952, she performed Ortrud in Lohengrin alongside Berthe Monmart, Raoul Jobin, Pierre Nougaro and Ernest Blanc.

On 15 and 16 March 1952, she performed the title role of Delilah in Samson et Dalila at the Municipal Theatre of Orléans (1951–1952 season).

She sang Amneris in Aida on 12 July 1952 at the Théâtre antique de Vienne and on 4 and 8 November 1952 at the Opéra d'Avignon.

She sang Taven in Mireille on 20 November 1952 at the Municipal Theatre of Calais.

In December 1952, she performed the title role in Hérodiade at the Opéra de Lyon.

In November 1954, she performed Ortrud in Lohengrin at the Opéra de Lyon.

In November 1954, she performed the role of Suzuki in Madama Butterfly at the Municipal Theatre of Calais.

=== Wagnerian repertoire ===
Marie-Louise Debierre was especially admired in the works of Richard Wagner. Critics regularly praised the power of her lower register, the quality of her French diction, and her dramatic temperament, particularly in the roles of Ortrud, Fricka and Schwertleite.

=== Algiers Opera ===
During the 1954–1955 season of the Algiers Opera, she appeared in performances of Boris Godunov, singing the roles of the Hostess and the Nurse.

=== Final years of her career ===
In October 1956, she performed Léonor de Guzman in La Favorite at the Opéra de Lille.

=== Barcelona ===
During the 1957–1958 season, Marie-Louise Debierre was engaged at the Gran Teatre del Liceu in Barcelona.

She appeared in several performances of:

- Thaïs by Jules Massenet, in the roles of Myrtale and Albine.
- Faust by Charles Gounod, in the role of Marthe.

== Principal repertoire ==
Role

Opera (work)

Date

• Albine
– Thaïs
(1957–1958)
• Amneris
– Aida
(1951, 1952)
• Delilah
– Samson and Delilah
(1951, 1952)
• Dulcinea
– Don Quichotte
(1946)
• Fricka
– Die Walküre
(1945)
• Gertrude (the Nurse)
– Roméo et Juliette
(1951)
• Gertrude
– Hamlet
(1947)
• Giovanna
– Rigoletto
(1951)
• Herodias
– Hérodiade
(1947, 1952)
• The Mother
– Louise
(1948, 1950)
• Léonor de Guzman
– La Favorite
(1956)
• The Nurse
– Boris Godunov
(1951, 1954–1955)
• Mallika
– Lakmé
(1951)
• Margared
– Le Roi d'Ys
(1950, 1952)
• Marthe
– Faust
(1951, 1957–1958)
• Ortrud
– Lohengrin
(1950, 1951, 1952, 1954)
• Schwertleite
– Die Walküre
(1951–1952)
• Suzuki
– Madama Butterfly
(1954)
• Taven
– Mireille
(1952)
• Toinette
– Le Chemineau
(1943, 1951)

== Critical reception ==
Specialized press praised the richness of Marie-Louise Debierre's lower register, the warmth of her tone, her diction, and her dramatic interpretation. Her performances in the Wagnerian repertoire, particularly as Ortrud in Lohengrin, received particular acclaim (1950, 1951, 1952, 1954).

== Bibliography ==
- Archives of the Paris Opera.
- Archives of the Opéra-Comique.
- Archives of the Opéra national de Bordeaux.
- Archives of the Gran Teatre del Liceu.
- Bibliothèque nationale de France (Gallica).
