= Anne Meson =

French show host and singer (born 1975)

Anne Meson (born 12 May 1975) is a French show host and singer.

== Early life ==
Her mother, Anne, was a Russian artist and a dance teacher. Her father, José, was a Spanish acrobat and a principal dancer at the Moulin Rouge in Paris. In her childhood, Meson studied piano, dance, and horse riding.

Her TV career began in 1982 at age 7, when she appeared in several commercials. She also was a child model.

== Career ==
Meson debuted on film in 1984, in Stress along with French actors Carole Laure and Guy Marchand. Later, she joined the casts of L'amour ou presque (1985), La lettre perdue (1987), and Bernadette (1988).

Meson also appeared on stage. She played in Molière's Le malade imaginaire, and starred in Philippe Chatel's famous musical Emilie Jolie. Two years later, Meson performed as an accompanist to French rock-star Johnny Hallyday during one of his concerts in Paris-Bercy.

=== Disney ===
In 1989, Meson became the French Disney Ambassador, succeeding Douchka.

Her singing career began with Oliver, inspired from Disney's Oliver and Company (1988). Her first solo album was released a few months later. In the meantime, her TV career blossomed as she co-presented the Disney Parade French show with French presenter Jean-Pierre Foucault.

From this moment on, her career bore the "Disney" seal: as the French Disney Ambassador, she made the cover of several Disney magazines, and recorded stories on cassette tapes. She performed the French version of Disney animated series, including Chip 'n Dale Rescue Rangers (released in France under the title Tic et Tac, les rangers du risque) and Darkwing Duck (Myster Mask). Meson also worked at French radio station RTL where she appeared on RTL en scène and Quoi de neuf chez Disney. She appeared in the French version of the musical Annie playing Tessie, one of the orphans, and then took the title role.

Meanwhile, three of the four first album's singles made it to the top ranks of the French Charts, and two years later, she was among the nominees for the 1991 "Victoire de la Musique – Album pour enfants de l'année" (Best Album for Children of the Year) for her first album and her new LP, Demain c'est aujourd'hui (Tomorrow is Today) is released. Demain c'est aujourd'hui contains several tracks entirely independent from Disney movies and characters, like 1.2.3 Soleil or Mais qu'est-ce qui m'arrive? Meson took part in a single designed to save a radio station for children "Superloustic".

In 1992, Meson was back to the stage of the Olympia. The same year, her third album was released. Christened Que fera la belle? (a reference to Disney's Beauty and the Beast (1991)) it had few "Disney" songs. Her second album was nominated for the Victoire de la Musique (Best album for Children of the Year). That year, Meson sat for her Baccalauréat, while preparing her last Disney album, Mon plus beau rêve (My Dearest Dream).

Meson left the Disney label in 1994.

=== United States ===
The following year, Meson hosted her own show on French TV, before leaving to the United States, where she attended the Theatre of Art. Her American career included dubbing movies and commercials and writing her first play, Alfredo's way. She returned to France to dance in Maurice Béjart's 1789 et nous, during the anniversary of the French Revolution. She joined the Notre-Dame de Paris B cast in Las Vegas. This cast recorded an album, in which she sang these three songs: "So Look No More For Love", "Shining Like the Sun" and "My Heart If You Will Swear".

She was selected for the new Notre-Dame de Paris French cast, in which she sometimes played the roles of Esméralda and Fleur-de-lys. She recorded a demo for Randall Wallace's film The Man in the Iron Mask and a chorus part on a track in Garou's solo debut album Seul.

Meson moved to Spain where she lives with her boyfriend. She has not given up singing, as she's a member of Spanish band Naughty Noise.

== Discography ==
=== Albums ===
- 1990: Anne
- 1991: Demain c'est aujourd'hui
- 1992: Anne au pays d'EuroDisney
- 1992: Que fera la belle
- 1993: A toi de chanter volume 1 et 2
- 1993: Mon plus beau rêve
- 1994: Ses plus belles chansons
- 2000: Notre Dame de Paris Las Vegas cast B
- 2000: Garou – Seul (Choeurs sur "Criminel")
- 2000: Naughty noise – New bauhaus
- 2002: Naugthy noise – Mind your head

== Singles ==
- 1987: Comme le dit toujours mon père (chorus)
- 1989: Oliver
- 1990: Si ma vie tourne bien
- 1990: La petite sirène
- 1990: Les p'tits loups
- 1990: Anne
- 1991: Bernard et Bianca au pays des kangourous
- 1991: 1,2,3 soleil
- 1991: Demain c'est aujourd'hui (special edition)
- 1991: Superloustic – Ta radio c'est ton droit (participation)
- 1991: Demain c'est aujourd'hui
- 1992: Anne au pays d'EuroDisney
- 1992: Que fera la belle
- 1992: Comme Bambi
- 1992: Dans le bleu
- 1993: Mon plus beau rêve
- 1993: Tout le monde veut devenir un cat
- 1993: A toi de chanter volume 1 et 2
- 1993: Mon plus beau rêve
- 1994: Ses plus belles chansons

== Filmography ==
- 1984: Stress de Jean-Louis Bertucelli
- 1985: L'amour ou presque de Jean-François Balme
- 1987: La lettre perdue de Jean-Louis Bertucelli
- 1988: Bernadette de Jean Delannoy
