= Hector Dupeyron =

French opera singer

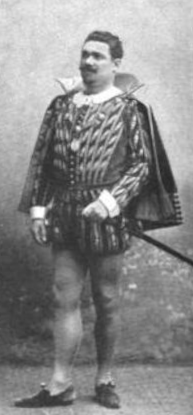
- In The Sketch, 21 July 1897
- Born: 10 November 1861; Bordeaux, France
- Died: July 1911 (aged 49)
- Education: Conservatoire de Paris
- Occupation: operatic tenor
- Years active: 1887–1906

Hector Dupeyron (1861–1911) was a French operatic tenor who had a prolific opera career in Europe from 1887 through 1906. Possessing a powerful and dramatic voice, he particularly excelled in the works of Richard Wagner and Giacomo Meyerbeer.

== Biography ==
Hector Dupeyron was born in Bordeaux on 10 November 1861. He studied at the Conservatoire de Paris under Ernest Boulanger and Louis-Henri Obin. He made his professional opera debut in 1887 at the opera house in Nîmes as Eleazar in Halévy's La Juive. He sang at that same house for the next two years, after which he toured with a Parisian opera company in 1889 throughout Europe. From 1890 to 1892 he sang at the Théâtre de la Monnaie in Brussels. After leaving Brussels he sang the role of Don José in Bizet's Carmen at the Opéra de Monte-Carlo.

In 1893 Dupeyron joined the Opéra de Paris, making his first appearance there as Matho in Ernest Reyer'sSalammbô. He appeared there several more times through 1895 in such roles as the title role in Reyer's Sigurd, the title role in Giacomo Meyerbeer's Robert le Diable, Raoul in Meyerbeer's Les Huguenots, the title role in Charles Gounod's Faust, the title role in Richard Wagner's Lohengrin, Siegmund in Wagner's Die Walküre, the Samson in Camille Saint-Saëns's Samson et Dalila, and the title role in Giuseppe Verdi's Otello. His final portrayal at the Opéra de Paris was in the title role of Wagner's Tannhäuser in 1895.

In 1897, Dupeyron joined the roster at the Royal Opera House, Covent Garden in London. He sang there in numerous productions through 1902, including portraying Alfredo in Verdi La traviata, Arnoldo in Rossini's William Tell, Edgardo in Donizetti's Lucia di Lammermoor and Turiddu in Pietro Mascagni's Cavalleria rusticana among others. In 1903 he returned to the Opéra de Monte-Carlo to sing in the world premiere of Eugène d' Harcourt's Le Tasse.

Dupeyron retired from the opera stage in 1906, after which he worked in Paris as a singing teacher until his death in July 1911. Among the first generation of musicians to be recorded, his voice is preserved on a handful of recordings made with Pathé in 1902 and Odeon Records in 1905.

== Sources ==
- Biography of Hector Dupeyron on Operissimo.com (in German). Accessed 4 March 2009.
