= Yianna Katsoulos =

- Born: Yianna Katsoulos; September 16, 1960 (age 65)
- Origin: Florida; France
- Genres: Pop
- Occupation: Singer
- Years active: 1986–2020
- Website: yiannakatsoulos.com

Yianna Katsoulos (born September 16, 1960) is a pop singer who sings in French. She was born in Florida, United States. In 1986, she had a top-30 single hit in France with "Les autres sont jaloux", although her next five singles did not achieve the same success. Katsoulos was also a presenter on television channel FR3, hosting L'Eurotop, a hit parade video show, Une pêche d'enfer where she presented fashion and travel tips five days a week, Salut Manu with Manu Dibango, a live music show featuring world renowned artists, Le MIDEM en Direct de Cannes where she interviewed stars for the annual music festival in Cannes. She was also a guest star on Dessinez c'est gagné and Surprise, Surprise. Benny Hill and Yianna Katsoulos presented the last Christmas Show FR3 before Benny Hill's death. In 2011, she released a single, "Fais-moi l'amour comme un français".

== Discography ==
=== Albums ===
- 1997 : Quelque chose dans l'atmosphère
- 2004 : Radio promo songs (compilation Best OF)
- 2013 : La Reine des Années 80
- 2020 : Only Clubbers Survive (3 part album)

=== Singles ===
- 1986 : "Les autres sont jaloux" – No. 30 in France
- 1987 : "Rien n'est pour toujours"
- 1988 : "Plus fort que les gâteaux"
- 1989 : "Salade de fruit"
- 1990 : "Faites pour un Millionnaire"
- 1997 : "Quelque chose dans l'atmosphère"
- 2003 : "Mademoiselle Street" (promotional single)
- 2004 : "Chacun pour soi" (promotional single)
- 2011 : "Fais-moi l'amour comme un français" – rock version & dance club version
- 2020 : "Drunky Talk 2K20"
