= Magdalith =

French artist and liturgist

Magdalith (August 4, 1932 – September 14, 2013), real name Madeleine Lipszyc, was a French painter, singer, composer, author and liturgist. Born in Toulouse to a Jewish family, she converted to Catholicism at the age of 19. Her Catholic faith did not stop her from identifying with her Jewish heritage. As a liturgist, she researched the relationship between synagogal chant and Gregorian chant.

Magdalith and her family were persecuted during the shoah. Magdalith, her sister and her mother were forced to hide in a dirty basement in Revel while her father died in Auschwitz. The trauma of the holocaust left her in poor health for the rest of her life.

She was discovered by Eddy Marnay, and worked closely with him during the 1970s. Marnay assisted Magdalith with two notable works: Improvisations (sometimes called Magdalith) and Grégorien. Improvisations is a work of avant-garde music, while Grégorien consists of original interpretations of diverse pieces from the traditional Gregorian repertoire.

Because of her poor health, she was never able to take the full vows of a nun. However, she lived in a Congregation of Our Lady of Sion convent in Draveil for the rest of her life. She died from cancer there in 2013.
