= Jean-Paul Volnay =

French musician (1952–2020)

- Born: 1952; Saint-Pierre, Réunion
- Died: 23 December 2020 (aged 68); Paris, France
- Occupation: Musician

Jean-Paul Volnay (1952 – 23 December 2020) was a French musician. He performed in the Sega genre of music and was the singer-songwriter for many titles, including Le rhum la pa bon mèm, and Rouv' la porte. He was best known for his song L'Assassin.

He became known on Reunion in the late 1960s, and left for mainland France in 1971.

He died in Paris in 2020, following a long illness.
