= Noé Willer =

- Born: Hubert Sebban
- Origin: France
- Genres: Pop
- Occupation(s): Singer, composer
- Years active: 1960s–1990s
- Labels: Polydor

Noé Willer (real name: Hubert Sebban) is a former French singer. He was active from the 1960s to the early 1990s. He achieved success with his 1985 hit "Toi, femme publique", which peaked at No. 11 in France. He also composed songs for various artists, such as Nicolas Pinelli, Au Fil du Temps, Daniel Hamelin, Flash !, Michel Steffen, Sweeties, Silver, Madéï Thémis and Harry Williams.

== Discography ==
=== Albums ===
- 1986: "En Version Originelle"

=== Singles ===
- 1960s: "À quoi, à quoi"
- 1960s: "Comme un papillon"
- 1960s: "On n'a pas les pieds sur terre"
- 1980s: "Qu'est-ce que c'est"
- 1971: "Pouce"
- 1972: "Le Monde à l'envers"
- 1974: "Adieu Nina"
- 1976: "Monique"
- 1978: "Attends un peu"
- 1982: "En haute fidélité"
- 1984: "Je funambule"
- 1985: "Toi, femme publique" – No. 11 in France
- 1986: "L'Épouvantail"
- 1986: "Sur minitel"
- 1988: "En transit"
- 1990: "La Nuit"
