= Claude Got =

French operatic bass (1906–1940)

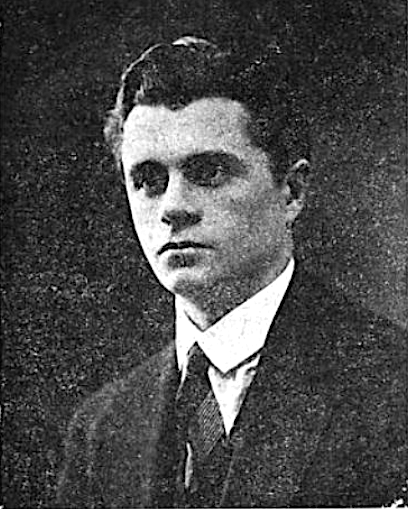
- Born: 22 December 1906; Paris, France
- Died: 9 June 1940 (aged 33); Croutoy, Oise, France
- Education: Paris Conservatory
- Occupation: opera singer

Claude Got (22 December 1906 – 9 June 1940) was a French bass opera singer whose career at major opera houses, including the Paris Opera and Opéra-Comique during the 1920s and 1930s, was cut short by his death as a volunteer medic during the Battle of Croutoy in World War II. Known for his rich, powerful voice and strong dramatic abilities, Got performed leading roles such as Boris Godunov, Mephistopheles in Faust, and Basilio in The Barber of Seville. His international career included performances at venues such as the Liceu in Barcelona, Teatro Colón in Buenos Aires, and opera houses in Rio de Janeiro, while also maintaining a presence on French radio broadcasts during the 1930s. Despite never making commercial recordings, Got's artistry was preserved through private recordings made by his father, which were later featured in a commemorative radio broadcast in 1947.

== Early life , education and marriage ==
Paul André Claude Got was born on December 22, 1906, in Paris. After initially studying law, Got's vocal talent was recognized by Busser, who was struck by his voice and encouraged him to audition for the Paris Conservatory. Got entered the Conservatory on November 28, 1926, and graduated in July 1928, earning three first prizes in singing, Opéra-Comique, and opera, along with the prestigious Osiris Prize.

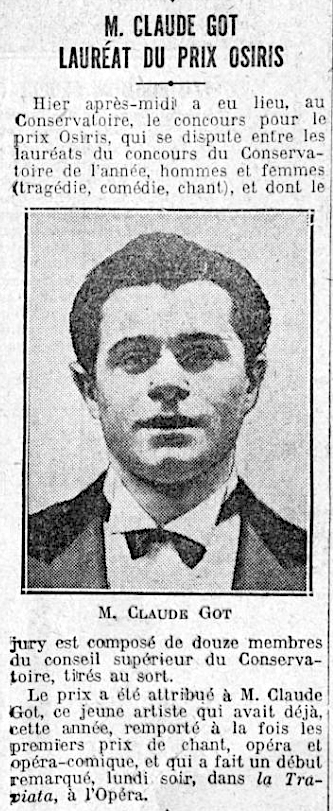
Got, Osiris prize winner, Paris Conservatory, 1928

Paul André Claude Got married Ethel Sophie Keyser on February 5, 1939, in Paris. Keyser, an American of Belgian descent, was fluent in French and served both as a “Hello Girl” and as an embassy employee in France. During World War II, she and other embassy staff were captured by Nazi forces and held for approximately 15 months. She never remarried and continued her work with the U.S. Embassy after the war. Her name and dates are inscribed on Got’s footstone, and she may be buried alongside him.

During his conservatory studies, Got demonstrated exceptional progress, particularly in his competition piece performance of King Philip II's monologue from Don Carlos. This performance showcased the richness and range of his voice, as well as the "nobility of his phrasing". The jury, press, and leading music critics praised his interpretations, recognizing in Got's rich bass voice a rare combination of range and power, beauty and flexibility.

== Career and repertoire ==
Got made his professional operatic debut in 1928 at the Paris Opera in a production of La traviata. His true breakthrough came on September 25, 1929, with a performance as Boris Godunov. This portrayal won him some acclaim, with Le Temps noting his "immense presence and commanding voice", despite his youth for such a demanding role.

Got's reputation grew rapidly, and by 1931, he was performing in major roles at the Opéra-Comique, debuting as Comte des Grieux in Manon. Critics appreciated his ability to combine vocal power with strong acting skills. A review in Comoedia from this period lauded his "dignified yet emotional portrayal" of characters, emphasizing his range from tender moments to fierce confrontations on stage.

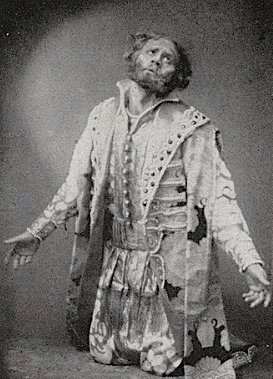
Got playing Mussorgsky's Boris Godunov

As Mephistopheles in Gounod's Faust, Got earned particular recognition. A 1933 review in L'Ouest-Éclair described him as "incarnating Mephistopheles with a devilish charisma, his booming voice sending chills through the audience".

In 1934, Got took on the role of Dom Basile in Le Barbier de Séville. According to L'Ouest-Éclair, Got "struck the spectators immediately", with his deep and resonant bass voice filling the room. His interpretation was praised for its originality and dynamism.

The casting was uneven, but a young singer named Claude Got had a huge success, with his magnificent bass voice and his ample histrionic powers. Despite his youth, he adumbrated such authority that no one paid attention to any one else when he was on the stage.

— Henry Prunières, The New York Times, "Modern Works in Paris", April 15, 1933

One of Got's most memorable performances came in January 1939 when he portrayed Nilakantha in Lakmé at the Opéra-Comique. Excelsior praised his performance for its "emotional depth and superb vocal control", calling him "the heart of the production".

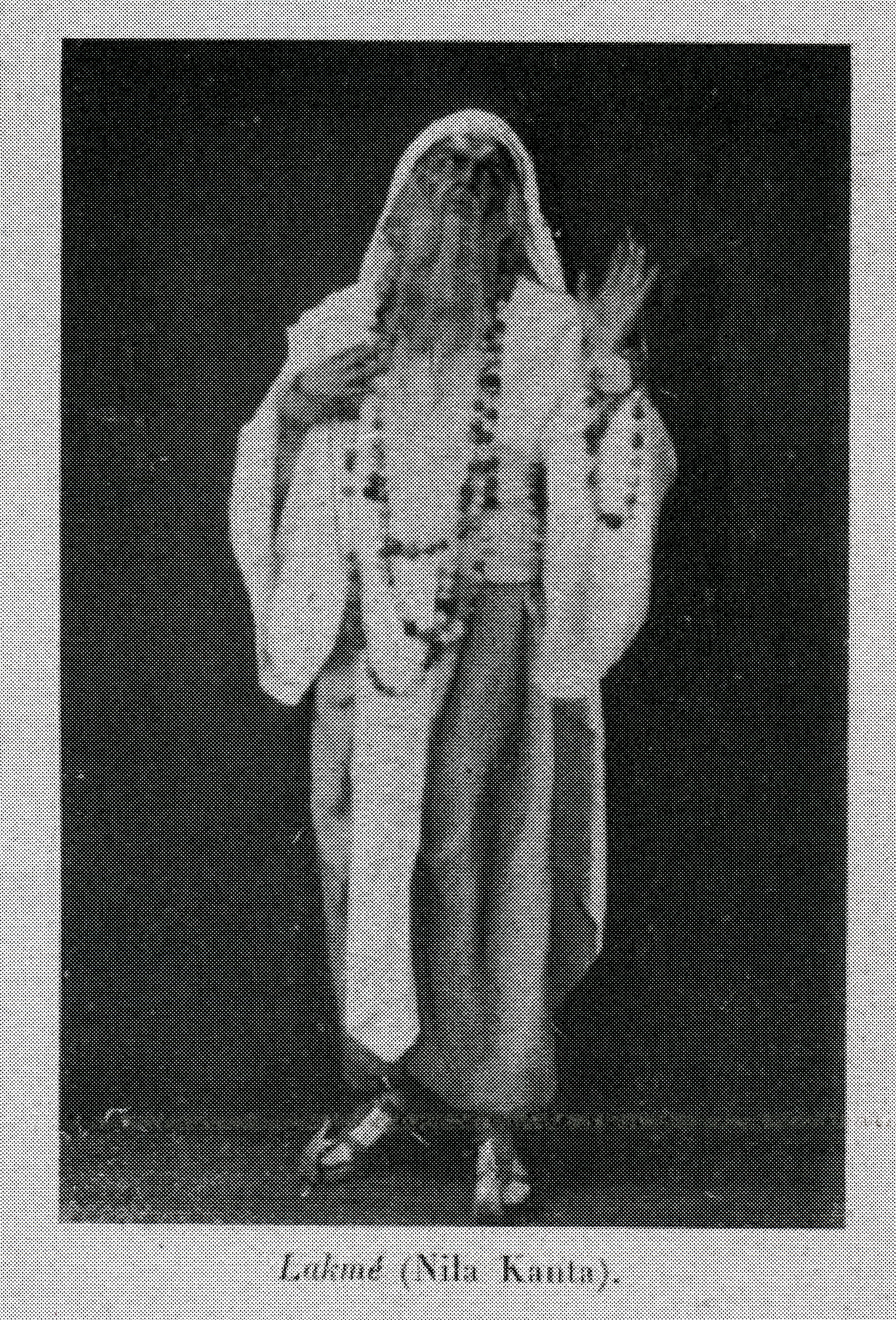
Got as Nilakantha in Lakmé by Léo Delibes

His complete repertoire included Boris Godunov in Mussorgsky's Boris Godunov, Mephistopheles in Faust, Basilio in The Barber of Seville, King Philip II in Don Carlos, Nilakantha in Lakmé, the title role in Tarass Boulba, Ramon in Gounod's Mireille, Priam in Les Troyens, the four Damons in Les Contes d'Hoffmann, roles in Tosca, Don Quixote, Louise, Pelléas et Mélisande, La bohème, and Mathis in Le Juif polonais.

Got performed internationally, including appearances at the Liceu in Barcelona in 1930 and at the Teatro Colón in Buenos Aires in 1938. His performances of Tarass Boulba at the Opéra-Comique in March 1933 were particularly acclaimed, with Le Figaro describing his portrayal as "a masterclass in dramatic intensity".

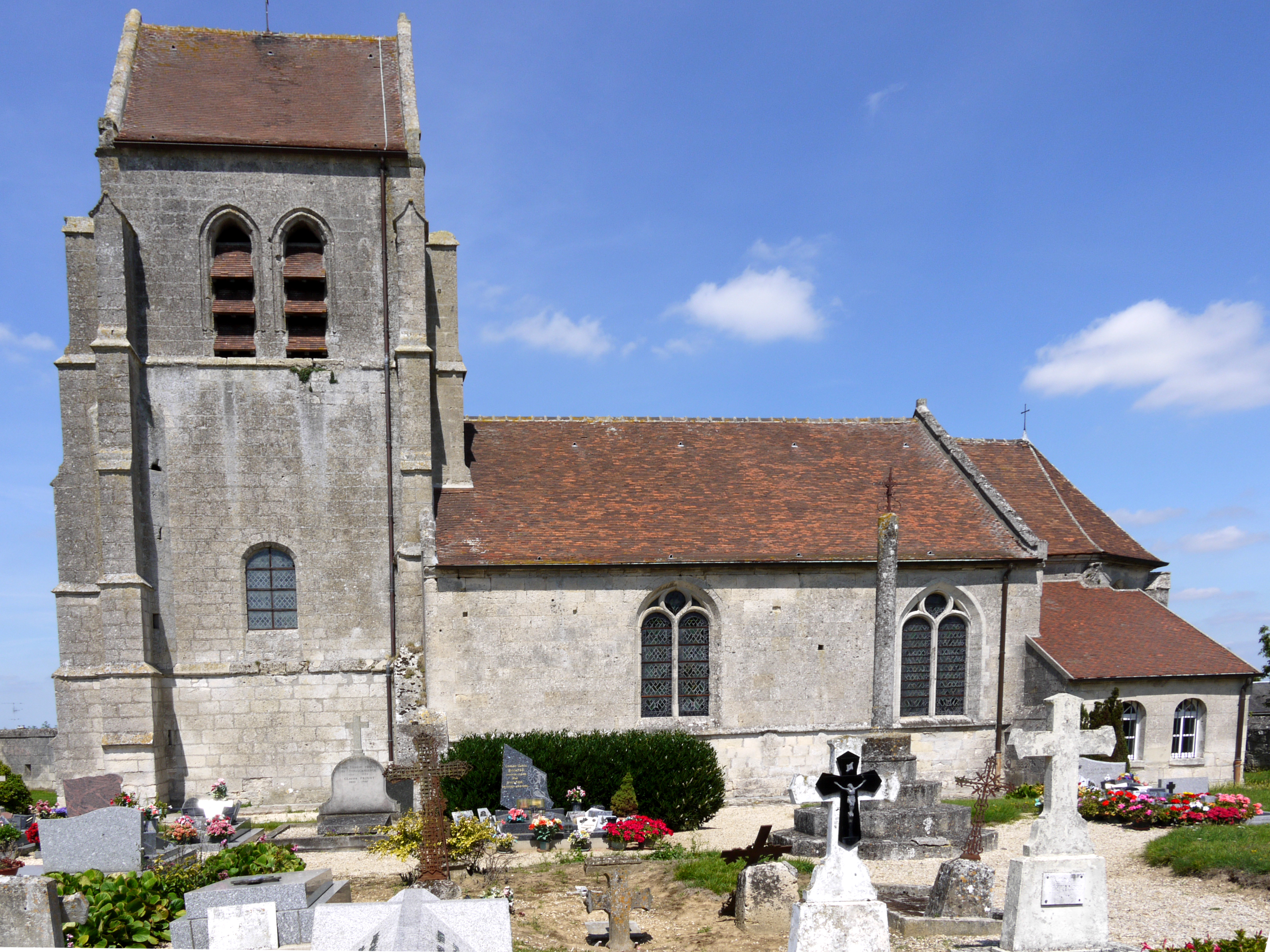
Église-du-Croutoy where Got is buried

== Military service and death ==
When World War II broke out, Got was performing in Rio de Janeiro but immediately returned to France to serve his country. Got volunteered as a medic, eventually serving as a Corporal in the 22nd SIM (Military Nursing Section), specifically in GBD – Heavy Surgical Ambulance 413.

Colonel-Doctor Vermelin, reviewing Got's small group of stretcher-bearers on May 25, 1940, commended Got for his leadership during recent events, noting his conduct during the action at Cocherel on May 10. Got was last seen by his father on June 6 in Saint-Sauveur, in the forest of Compiègne, where he was leading his group of divisional stretcher-bearers.

On June 8, 1940, Got was ordered to Croutoy, where fighting had been raging for three days. According to a sergeant-medic's later account, Got arrived that evening with several men, but found the infirmary full. They were advised to set up across from the church square, in a house with a shelter. That night, the battalion suffered heavy losses. Despite orders to evacuate, Got remained behind with a few stretcher-bearers to care for the wounded. They were killed at close range by German forces.

Initially, eleven graves remained side by side in the village square of Croutoy, with Got's marked by a simple wooden cross bearing the number 2681. Got was later moved to the Communal Cemetery of Croutoy, where he rests in a family vault. Three years after his death, his father was awarded the Croix de Guerre with silver star in his son's name, and a proposal was made for the Legion of Honor or Military Medal.

Got's colleagues at the Opéra-Comique placed a bronze medallion in his honor in the Artists' Lounge, created by Louis Morel. The unveiling ceremony was particularly poignant as Got had been scheduled to perform at the Opéra-Comique that season before his military service intervened.

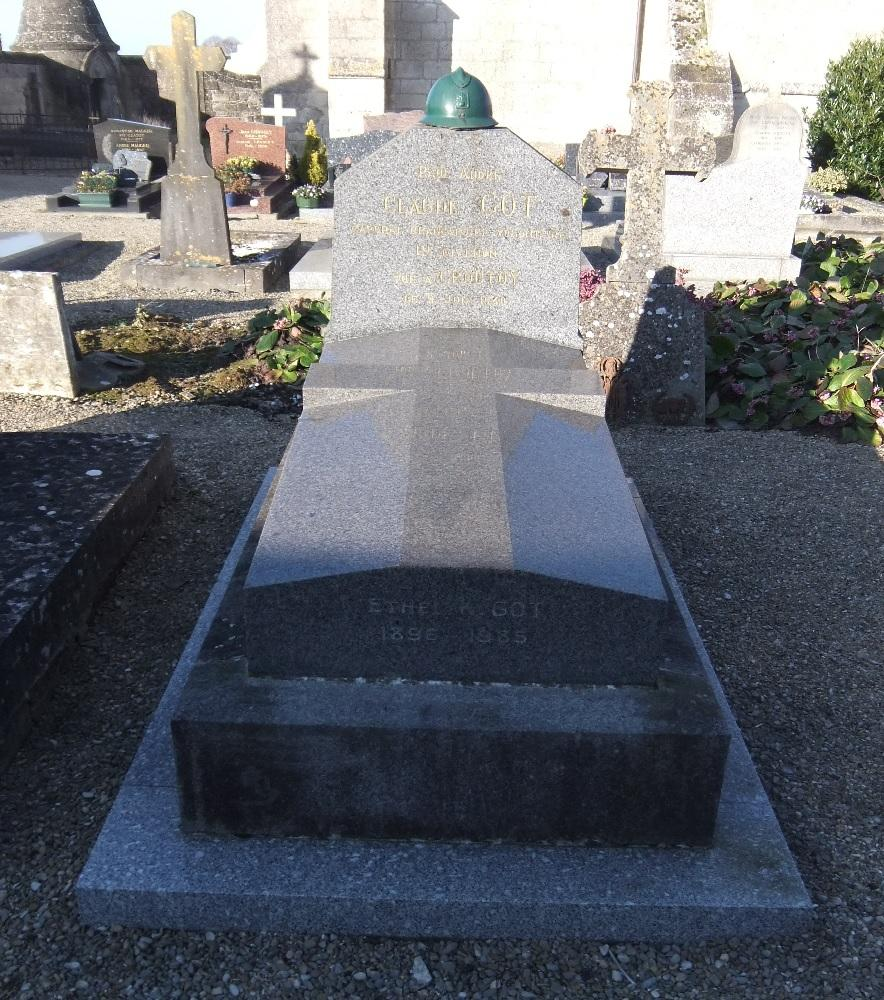
Grave of Got at the cemetery in Croutoy

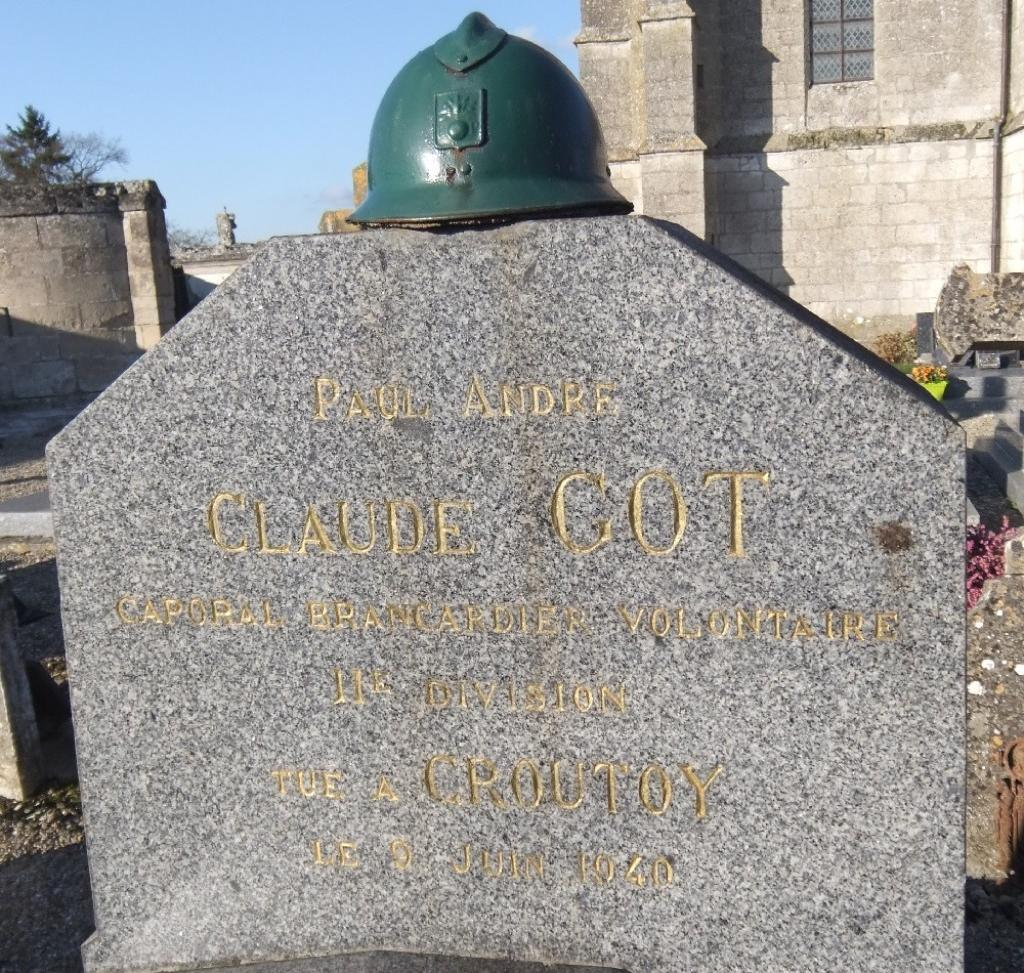
Closeup of headstone at Got's grave in Croutoy

== Legacy ==
=== Artistic legacy ===
Although Got never made commercial recordings, his father preserved private recordings made during Got's rehearsals, where he was accompanied on piano by his mother. These working materials captured Got in several signature roles, including selections from Don Carlos, The Barber of Seville, and Lakmé. The recordings, while informal in nature, retain what contemporaries described as "an emotional spontaneity that is touching today". The 1947 radio tribute, featuring Got's preserved recordings, drew attention to both his artistic achievements and his sacrifice.

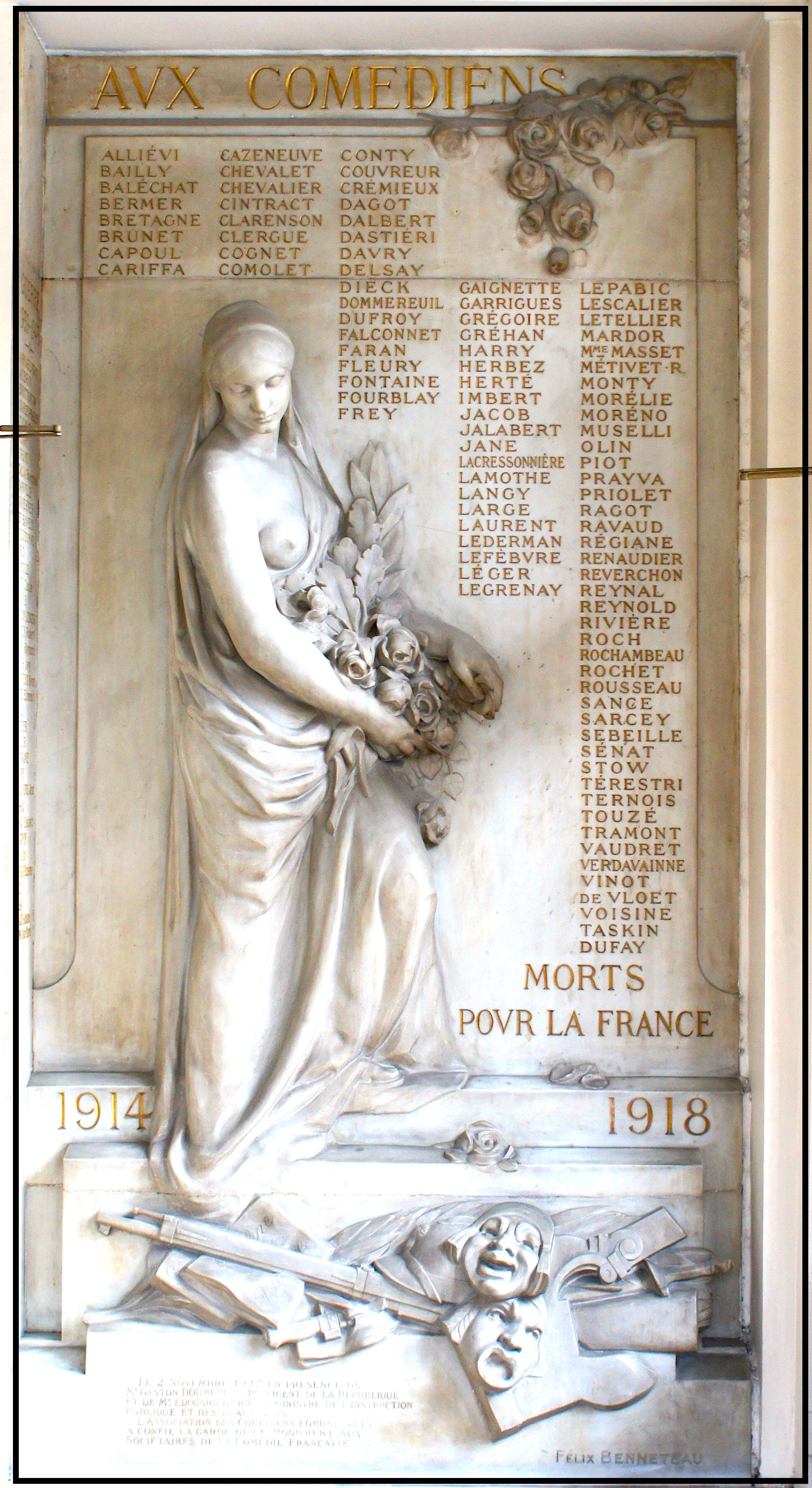
Commemorative monument at the Comédie Française where Got's name is inscribed

=== Performance style and innovation ===
Got's influence on French opera interpretation in the 1930s was particularly notable in his innovative approaches to traditional roles. His portrayal of Dom Basile in Le Barbier de Séville demonstrated this originality, with critics noting how he "departed from classical interpretations". His artistic legacy is especially documented in his interpretations of major roles, including Boris Godunov, Mephistopheles, and Nilakantha in Lakmé.

=== Broadcasting career ===
Got's performances on Radio Paris and Radio Marocaine in the 1930s reached audiences beyond the opera house. His December 1935 broadcast with Paule Gilly and the Chorale Sine Nomine, along with his June 1935 performance of Weber's Oberon with the Orchestre National under D. E. Inghelbrecht, demonstrated his versatility across different musical genres.

=== Historical impact ===
The contrast between Got's artistic promise and his tragic death at age 33 became emblematic of a generation of French artists whose careers were cut short by World War II. While his career spanned just twelve years, Got's interpretations of traditional roles and his dedication to both his art and his country left a lasting impression on French cultural history. His preserved private recordings, though few in number, continue to document the voice that critics of his time consistently praised for its combination of power and subtlety.
