= Ntaba 2 London =

Congolese musician

- Born: Sandrine Ntaba; Paris, France
- Origin: Kinshasa
- Genres: Ndombolo; rumba
- Occupations: Dancer; Singer; songwriter
- Instruments: Guitar, drums
- Years active: 2010s–present
- Labels: Newjackboss; Sony Music Entertainment Africa

Sandrine Ntaba, known professionally as Ntaba 2 London, is a Congolese-French singer-songwriter and dancer. Her music is a blend of Congolese rumba's instrumental section, the sébène, with ndombolo. Born in France, she initially began her career as a dancer.

She transitioned to music with singles such as "Ntaba Birthday" featuring Rolls des Nuances (2021), "Mood" featuring Guccima and Rolls des Nuances (2022), and "Kokodo" (2023), which catapulted her into the limelight as a rising figure in ndombolo music. In 2024, she gained widespread recognition with the ndombolo- and amapiano-inspired single "Ndombopiano".

== Early life and career ==
While Ntaba's exact birth date remains unknown, she was born in France. Her name, Ntaba, means "goat" in Lingala. She began her career as a dancer, posting videos on social media that featured her signature ndombolo choreography intertwined with the fast-tempo sébène, an instrumental hallmark of Congolese rumba. Her dynamic performances quickly garnered a devoted following, earning her recognition as an influential figure in African dance.

Leaping to music, Ntaba released her debut single, "Ntaba Birthday" (featuring the dance troupe Rolls des Nuances), in 2021. In an interview with Afrik-News, she cited a desire to amplify Afro sounds and bring greater visibility to them in French media as key motivations for her transition to music. Her breakthrough came with the 2022 hit "Mood" (featuring Guccima and Rolls des Nuances), part of a dance music series she conceptualized under the same name. This success marked her emergence as a prominent ndombolo artist and led to her guest appearance at the 5th edition of L'Afrique Festival in Strasbourg, France, held on 1–2 July 2023. In September 2023, she released "Kokodo" (alternatively titled "Mood Pt.3"), another installment in the Mood series that solidified her as an up-and-coming artist in the genre, followed by "CR7" in May 2024.

On 17 July 2024, Ntaba released her landmark single "Ndombopiano" under Sony Music Entertainment Africa (SMEA), which was recorded in Kinshasa and mixed by DJ115. Produced by Newjackboss and Joel Synthé, the track blended the fast-paced beats of ndombolo with the deep basslines and hypnotic melodies of South African amapiano. The music video, directed by Amegavisu, featured Ntaba alongside fellow Congolese female dancers.

== Discography ==
=== Singles ===
Year	Title	Details
2021	"Ntaba Birthday" (featuring Rolls des Nuances)	Single, Released: 28 March 2021; Composers: Gael Stone and Mayaprod; Director: Malex; Label: Paradiz Musik
2022	"Mood" (featuring Guccima and Rolls des Nuances)	Single, Released: 23 December 2022; Production: Yanis Djam; Composer: LA; Lead guitar: Warren La frappe; Bass guitar: FofoBass; Piano: Joël Synthé; Mix and Mastering: Opseek
2023	"Kokodo" (alternatively titled "Mood Pt.3")	Single, Released: 29 September 2023; Director: YanisDjam; Composer: DJ Merco; Piano: Joel Synthé; Mix and Mastering: DJ Merco
2024	"CR7"	Single, Released: 31 May 2024; Production: Newjackboss; Director: Ilyasse Bastos; Composer: Joel Synthé; Lead guitar: Warren La frappe; Mix and Mastering: DJ Merco
2024	"Ndombopiano"	Single, Released: 17 July 2024; Production: Newjackboss; Director: Amegavisu; Composers: Joel Synthé, Luna Maserati, and Warren La Frappe; Arrangements, Mix and Mastering: DJ 115; Label: Sony Music Entertainment Africa (SMEA)
