= Laetitia Shériff =

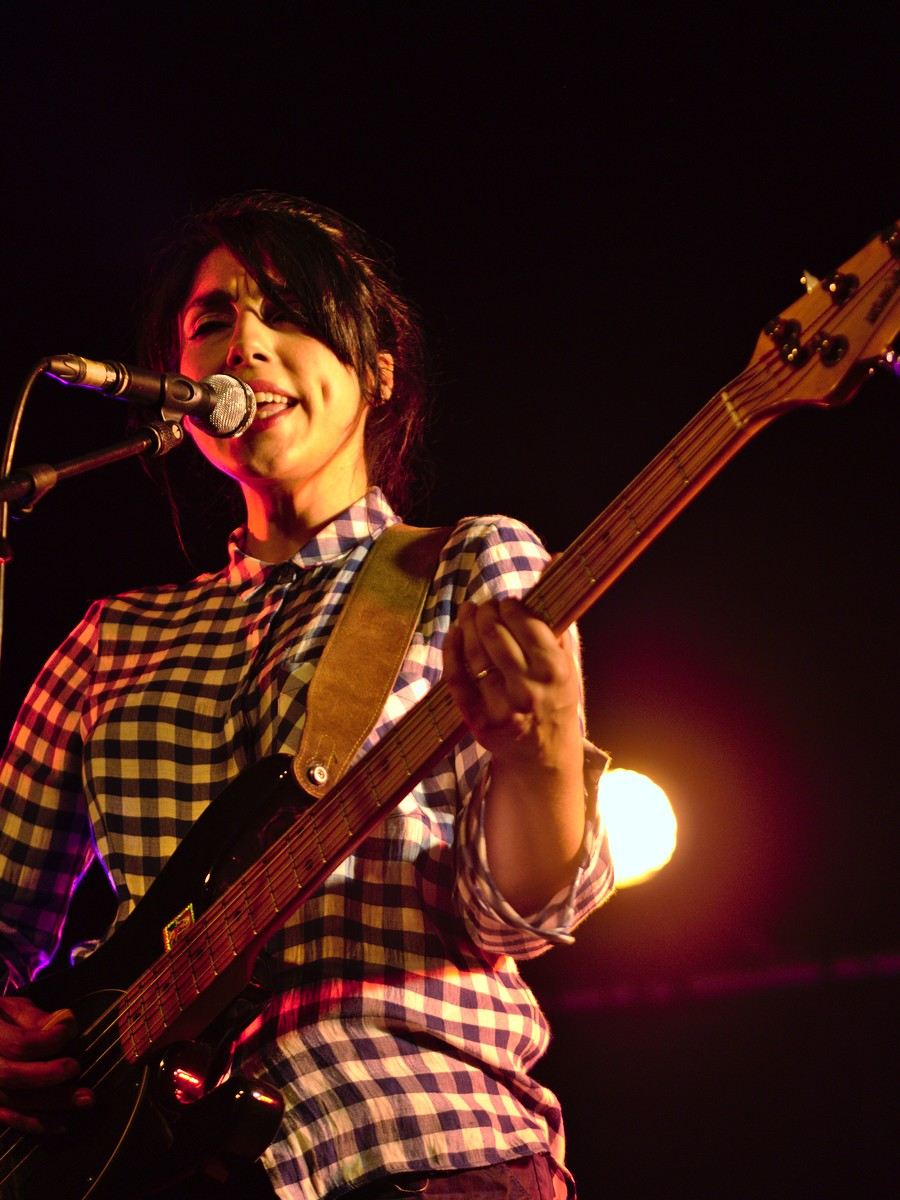
- Laetitia Shériff at the Partie(s) de Campagne festival (July 2015)

Background information
- Genres: Indie rock
- Occupation: Musician
- Instruments: Guitar, baritone guitar, bass, synthesizers
- Labels: les disques wah wah, Fargo Records, Naïve Records, Yotanka, Impersonal Freedom

Laetitia Shériff is a French rock musician who mainly performs in Indie rock genre.

== Biography ==
Raised in Paris and later in Lille, she began performing solo, singing texts by William Butler Yeats before she started writing her own material.

She met guitarist Olivier Mellano (guitarist for Dominique A) before being joined by drummer Gaël Desbois (of the band Mobiil). She moved to Rennes in 2003. The trio recorded her first English album, Codification, in 2004. She released her second album, Games Over, in May 2008 with Olivier Mellano and Gaël Desbois.

In 2012, she recorded the EP Where's My I.D.? which was released on vinyl. In 2014, Shériff released her third album titled Pandemonium, Solace And Stars. The album featured drummer Nicolas Courret (from the band Eiffel), guitarist and keyboardist Thomas Poli, and violinist Carla Pallone (a member of Mansfield.TYA). Pete Simonelli (member of the American band Enablers) also contributed, providing the introduction for the track Urbanism – After Goya.

In August 2015, the trio recorded a 5-track EP The Anticipation at Black Box studio. It was released on 30 October on vinyl by Yotanka and Impersonal Freedom.
