= Marvin Jouno =

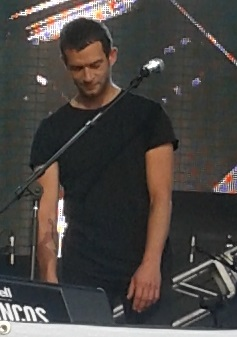
Marvin Jouno (2018).

Marvin Jouno is a musician and French singer.

Jouno's family is from Brittany in the north-west of France. He studied in the Paris area to become a film director but after several years as movie sets professional, he started to write song scripts, reworking them many times at nights, with romantic music on his life and his passion for film. This is also expressed though the songs "quitte á me quitter", "Si le vous, vous plait", and "love later".

In 2015, Jouno released his first EP Ouverture, consisting of four titles and released by Sony Music. Then in 2016, Jouno released his first LP called Interieur nuit with eleven songs, and a 48-minute musical film. The film, directed by Romain Winkler, was based on an idea from Jouno, depicting his work as a film actor and director.

He was selected in 2017 by Fonds d'action et d'initiative rock (FAIR) as a new talent, and was able as in 2016 to perform a tour of France, with Angelo Foley as director and Agnès Imbault as keyboard player.
