= Mad in Paris =

French hip hop and groove band

Mad in Paris was a French hip hop and groove band active in the 1990s. It was established in 1992 and was composed of eight musicians and one female singer, Ounsa, who came from the Créteil, Ivry and Grigny suburbs of Paris. The singer was the rapper CC Rider.

Mad in Paris was particularly known for the 1996 hit single "Paris a le blues", which peaked at number 25 in France and remained in the top 50 for 13 weeks. The second single "Réveillez-vous" failed to chart. Both songs are on the band's album Mad in Paris.

== Discography ==
=== Albums ===
- Mad in Paris
1. "Un peu de groove" — 5:01
2. "Réveillez-vous" — 4:14
3. "Paix sur nos frères" — 5:36
4. "Paris a le blues" — 4:51
5. "Douce Sensation" — 5:19
6. "Laisse Couleur" — 3:45
7. "Madjam" — 8:02
8. "Besoin de soul" — 5:34
9. "Get Ready" — 4:18
10. "Tout nés dépasse" — 5:15
11. "Go Go Live" — 5:41

=== Singles ===
- "Paris a le blues" - #25 in France
- "Réveillez-vous"
