= Zoë Avril =

- Born: 7 October 1980 (age 45)
- Origin: Nantes, France
- Genres: Pop
- Label: Mercury Records
- Website: http://www.zoeavril.com/

Zoë Avril, pseudonym of Raphaëlle Pleuvier de La Pontais (born 7 October 1980), is a French musician from Nantes. Her debut eponymous album was released in April 2008, which peaked at number 74 on the French albums chart. She has also been the subject of a series on M6 and W9, Le monde de Zoë Avril (Zoë Avril's World). She was discovered on the internet by Jury Jeunes Talents, organised by French mobile operator, SFR, before being signed to Mercury Records.
