= Monty (singer) =

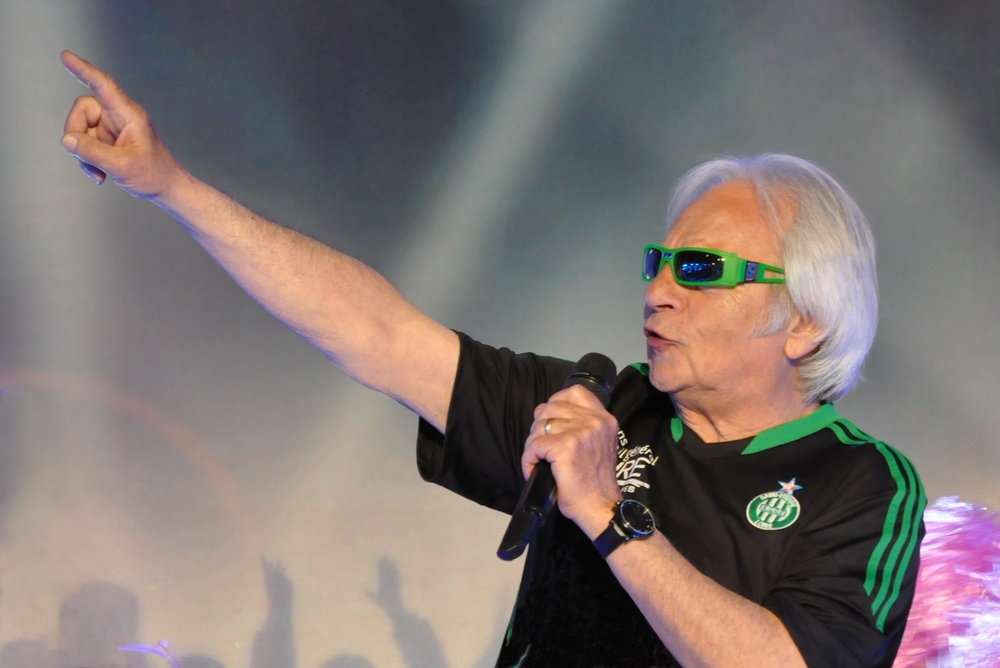

Background information
- Birth name: Jacques Bulostin
- Born: 18 February 1943 (age 82); Chezal-Benoît, Cher, France
- Genres: Pop, yé-yé
- Occupation(s): Singer, songwriter, radio presenter, record producer
- Years active: 1963–present
- Labels: Barclay

Jacques Bulostin (born 18 February 1943), known in his singing career as Monty and later as Jacques Monty, is a French singer, songwriter and record producer.

== Biography ==
Born in Chezal-Benoît, Cher, he learned piano and studied at the Conservatoire de Paris and Académie de la Grande Chaumière, but aspired to become a singer and songwriter. In 1963, he signed for the Barclay record label, where he was given the stage name of Monty. He quickly became one of the most successful male singers in France during the era of yé-yé music, touring with Claude François, and had hits from 1964 including "Même si je suis fou", "Un verre de whisky" (based on the Marvin Gaye song "Can I Get a Witness"), and "Ce n'est pas vrai". Many of his hit singles were arranged by Jacques Loussier. Monty often wrote his own lyrics to the tunes of American pop songs, and became a writer of songs for other artists including Éric Charden ("Le monde est gris, le monde est bleu"), Sheila ("Petite fille de français moyen"), France Gall ("Mon p'tit soldat"), and Dalida ("Mama"). In 1966, he replaced Daniel Filipacchi as host of the popular Europe n° 1 radio programme Salut les copains.

He returned to the top of the French pop charts in 1970 with "La fête au village". He created his own Monty record label, and increasingly worked as a record producer and composer. In 1974, as Jacques Bulostin, he composed music for the film Les Violons du bal. which was entered into the Cannes Film Festival. In 1976, he found further success writing and producing his song "Allez les verts", created for the supporters of football club AS Saint-Étienne. In the 1980s, he worked in New York City for Warner Bros. Records, and was involved in records by Stevie Wonder and Michael Jackson among others.

After returning to France, he was part of the 2013/14 Génération Âge tendre tour, highlighting artists from the 1960s and 1970s. He published an autobiography, Ma vie en vert du showbiz au chaudron, in 2017.
