= Cloé Vidiane =

French singer

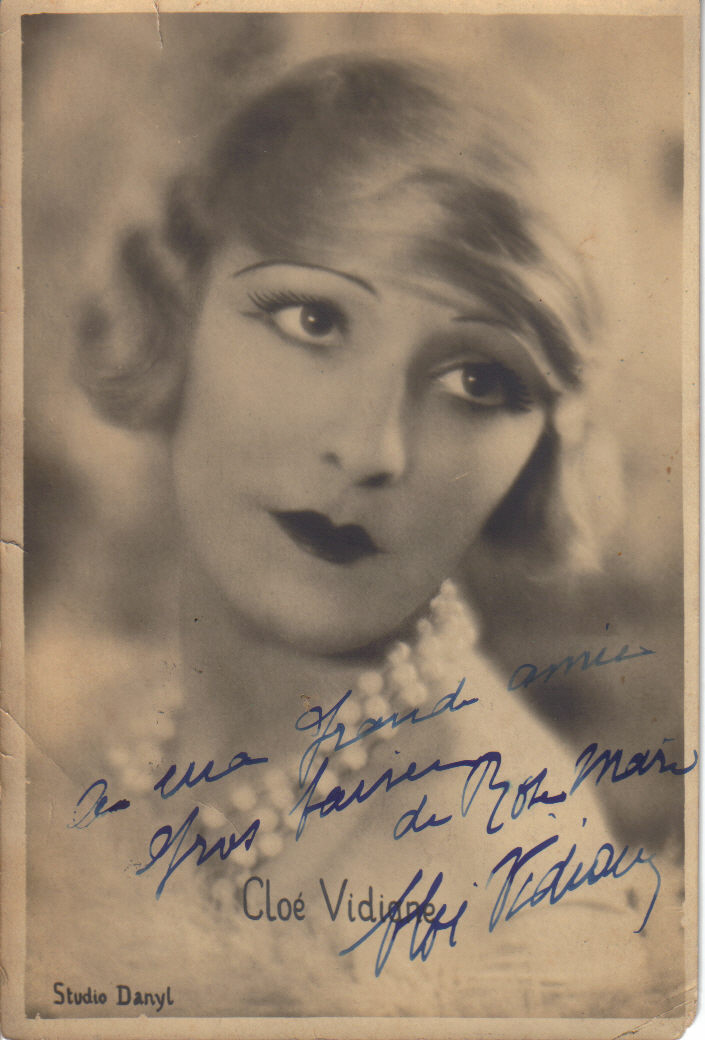
Cloé Vidiane

Cloé Vidiane was a French singer who performed in operetta, cabaret shows and films in Paris in the 1920s and 1930s. She played the title role, alternating with Madeline Masse, in the Paris production of Rose-Marie in 1927, which ran for a record 1,250 performances.
