= Louise Chevalier =

French opera singer (c. 1770s – after 1801)

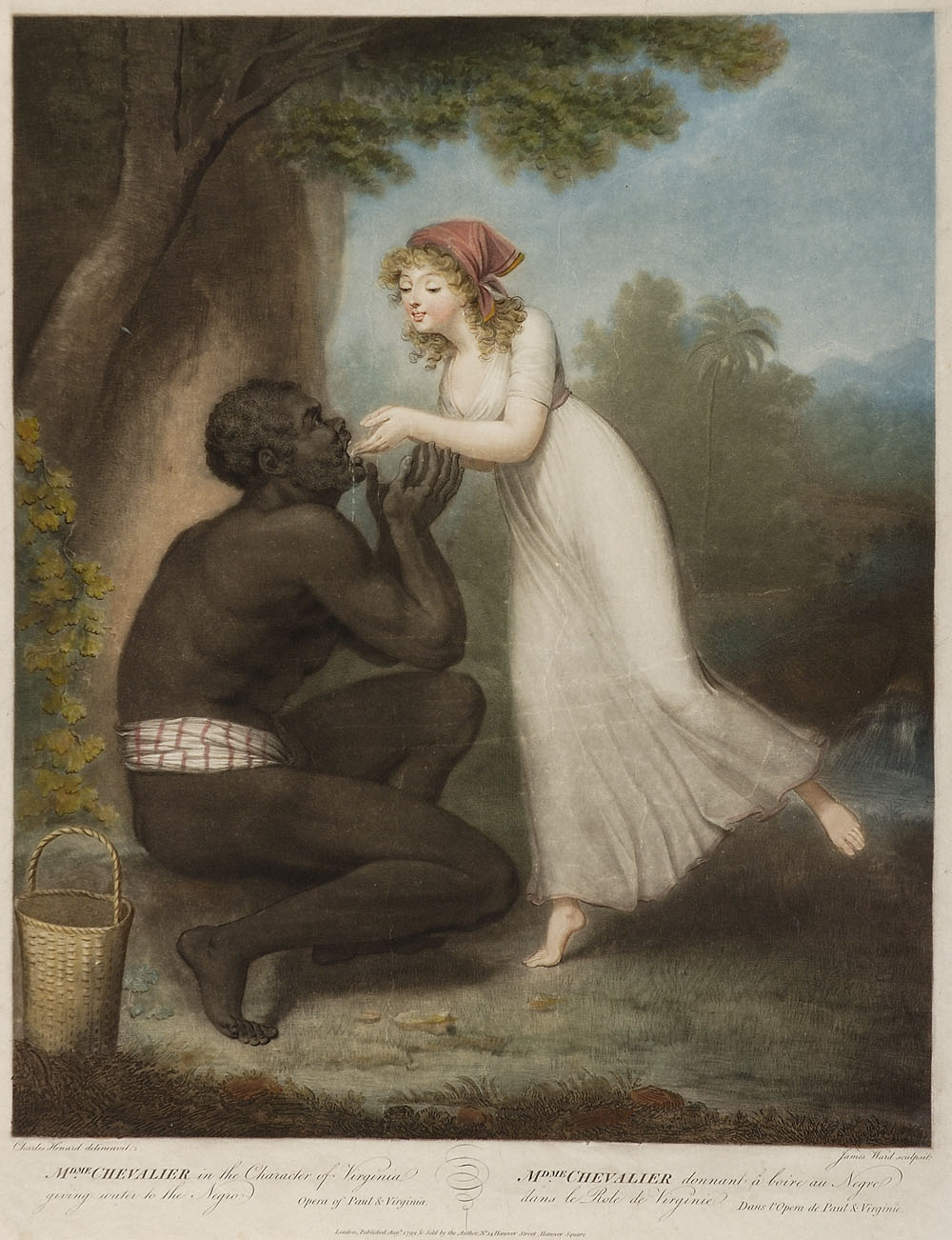
James Ward. Madame Chevalier in the Character of Virginia (after Ch. Henard). Coloured mezzotint. 1799

Louise Chevalier (c. 1770s – died after 1801) was a French actress and opera singer. She was active in Russia in the French theater troupe of her spouse, the ballet dancer and playwright Chevalier (Pierre Peicam), from 1797 until 1801.

During her tenure in Russia, she was the lover of first Ivan Kutaisov, the master of the horse, the court noble, and emperor's favorite, and then of the emperor himself, Paul I. She was an important figure during the reign of Paul I, when she wielded great influence as a channel for supplicants to Kutaisov and the emperor, and reportedly accepted substantial sums as such, and attracted great animosity in St. Petersburg.

After the fall of Paul I in March 1801, she was asked to leave Russia by his successor, Alexander I. It is not confirmed what happened to her after this, though conflicting reports place her as a courtesan and a spy in Paris, in Germany and in Poland.
