= Mounqup =

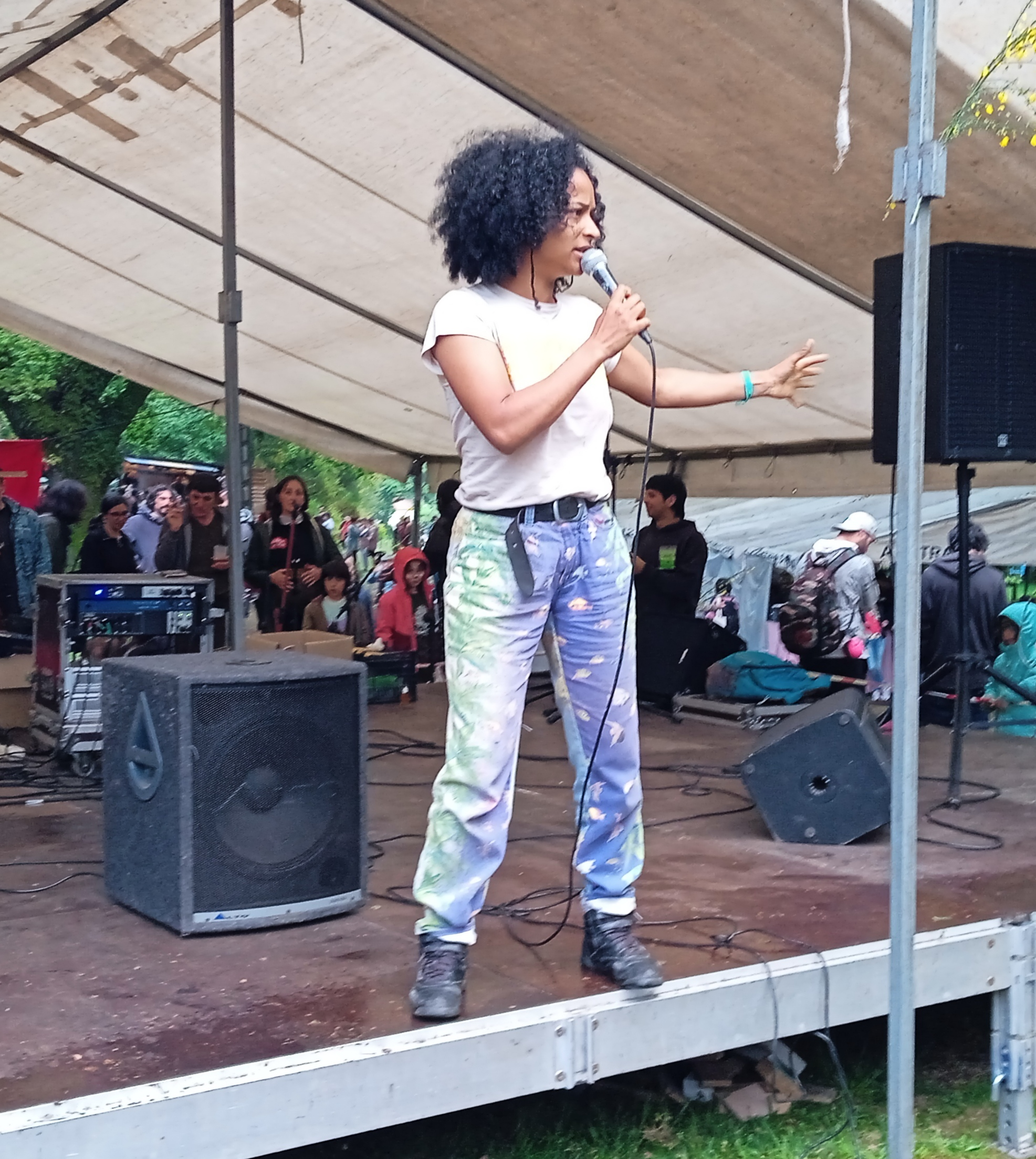
- MounQup in Sabucedo
- Born: Camille Hédouin; 1986 (age 39–40); Nantes, France
- Occupations: Singer; songwriter
- Years active: 2011–present
- Musical career
- Genres: Jazz; folk; electronic music
- Instrument: Vocals
- Label: Molho
- Website: mounqup.bandcamp.com

Camille Hédouin (born 1986) better known as Mounqup is a French-Galician singer-songwriter. Her musical style has been labeled as a mix of jazz and electronic music, although she defines herself as a "rural electronic vocalist".

== Early life and education ==
Hédouin was born in Nantes, France. After getting her degree in Biology in 2011, she arrived in Galicia to help in the recuperation of the village of Soumede, in the council of Bola.

== Career ==
In 2017 she received the Narf Award. In that same year she released her first album Proba de son, recorded by herself and mixed and mastered by the drummer of Belöp.

In June, 2018 she released her second album Castro Verdi.

In 2026, Hédouin starred in the musical documentary feature Juliette & Camille, directed by Paloma Zapata. The film, which follows her and musician Juliette Robles on a journey of identity and belonging through rural Galicia, was selected and presented at the Spanish Previews session of the Locarno Film Festival in August 2026.

== Personal life ==
Hédouin resides in the ourensan village of Gontán, Verea.

== Discography ==
- Proba de son (Molho, 2017)
- Castro Verdi (Molho, 2018)
