= Vivien Savage =

French singer-songwriter (born 1955)

- Born: Jérôme Pilet Desjardins; 2 January 1955 (age 71)
- Origin: France
- Genres: New wave, Pop
- Occupations: Singer, songwriter
- Years active: 1984–1987
- Website: viviensavage.com

Vivien Savage (born 2 January 1955) is a French singer-songwriter who reached popularity in the 1980s. He remains famous for his1984 single "La P'tite Lady", which was a top twenty hit on the SNEP singles chart. His other singles were unsuccessful, failing the chart and therefore Savage can be considered as a one-hit wonder. He was also an occasional actor, portraying Riton in José Pinheiro's 1988 film "Ne réveillez pas un flic qui dort" (Let Sleeping Cops Lie). In 2006, he also participated in the concert tour RFM Party 80, composed of many artists of the 1980s.

== Discography ==
=== Singles ===
- 1984 : "La P'tite Lady"
- 1985 : "C'est qu'le vent"
- 1986 : "Vl'a les flics" (duet with Alain Souchon)
- 1986 : "Bébé, j'le sens bien"
- 1987 : "Dans la ville (juste un peu d'amour pour toi)"
- 1987 : "Tahiti Tahiti"
