= Auguste Jacques Étienne Peschard =

French opera singer

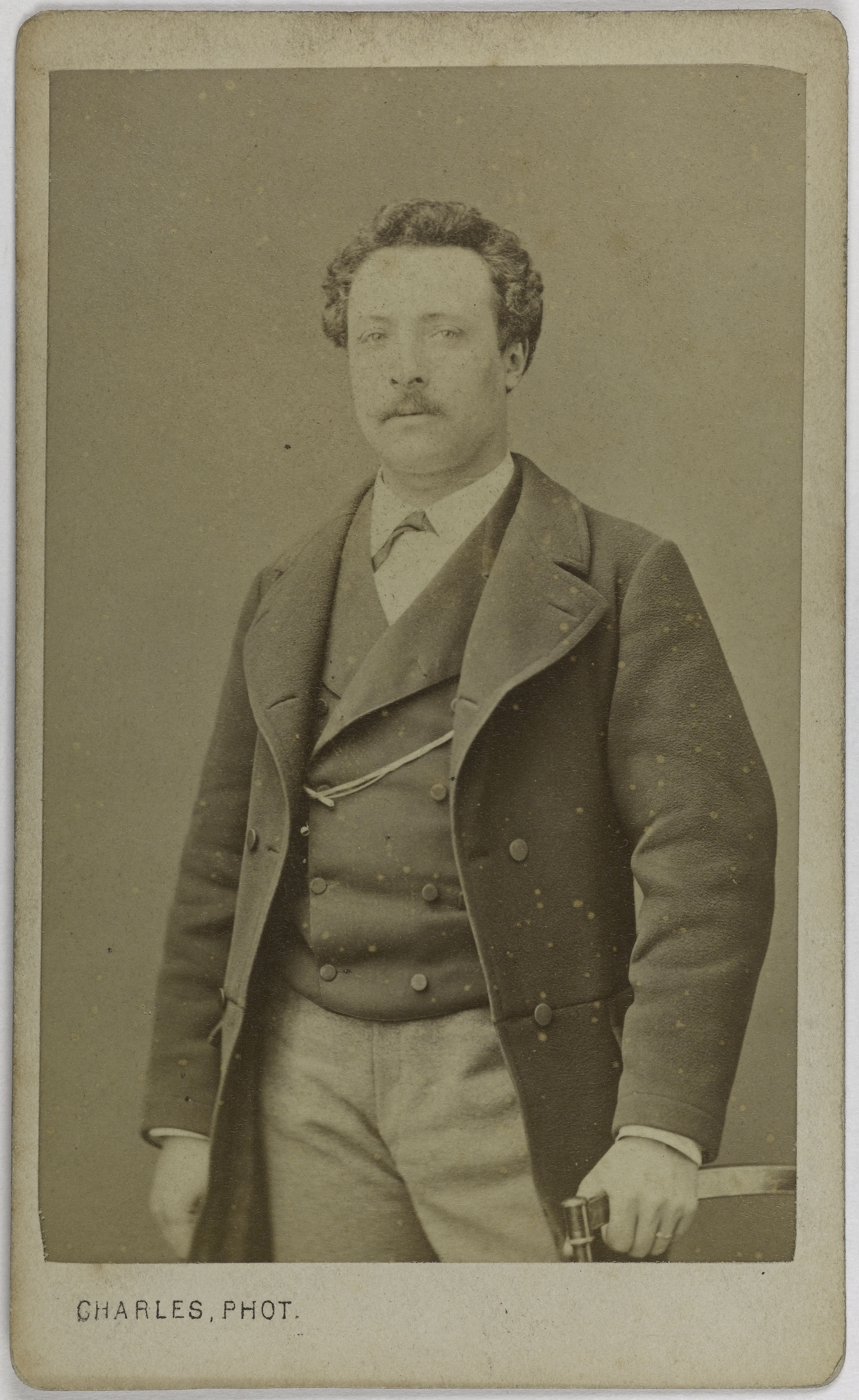

Background information
- Born: 26 December 1834; Rented, Sarthe
- Died: 6 September 1898 (aged 63); Bordeaux
- Occupation: Opera Singer (Tenor)

Auguste Jacques Étienne Peschard (26 December 1834 — 6 September 1898) was a French opera singer who was a tenor at the Paris Opera. He married twice: first to the famous Parisian operetta, Marie Blanche Renouleau, who performed under the name Madame Peschard, and then again, four years prior to his death, to Suzanne Marie Catherine Piffard.

== Life and career ==
=== Early years ===
Peschard was born to Jacques Peschard, a watchmaker, and Jeanne Marie Drivon. He was a pupil of Revial at the Paris Conservatory, he won a second singing prize in 1858, a first singing prize and a second opera prize in 1859, and in 1860 a first opera prize. The same year, he started at the Théâtre Lyrique on Boulevard du Temple on 19 December 1860, performing in the first performance of the Fishermen of Catania (Fernand) by Aimé Maillart.

=== Opera ===
Peschard began at the Paris Opera in September 1862 in Count Ory and stayed there until 1 July 1863. He then sang in Bordeaux (1864-1865); in Lyon (1868); in Bordeaux (1869); at the Monnaie de Bruxelles (1870-1872), where he performed on the Roussalkas (Ivan) of the Baroness de Maistre and the Florentin Emile Pichoz, until a serious disease left him bedridden; he was cast in Lohengrin but needed to be replaced. He did eventually return to the stage and performed again in Bordeaux (1873); then in Paris (1874 and following years).
