= Zina Brozia =

French operatic soprano

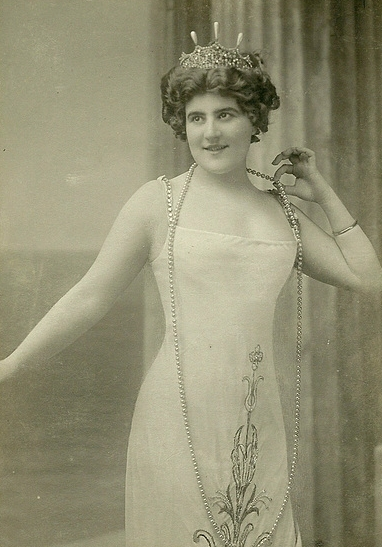
Zina Brozia as Thais (1908)

Zina Brozia born Ambrozine Baptiste (1876–1958) was a French operatic soprano who made her début at the Opéra Comique in 1905 and at the Opéra Garnier in 1908. Brozia also performed in Brussels, Parma and Boston.

== Biography ==
Born on 29 June 1876 in Bourg-lès-Valence in south-eastern France, Ambrozine Baptiste was the daughter of Joseph Baptiste, a glazer, and Irma Chopin. (She later adopted the stage name of Zina Brozia, an anagram of Ambrozine.) She was the youngest of three sisters and one brother. She studied under the Romanian soprano Elena Theodorini. After an initial début as Marguerite in Faust at the Théâtre de la Monnaie in Brussels (1904–1905), on 13 September 1905, she made her Paris début at the Opéra Comique, playing Violetta in Verdi's La Traviata. Still at the Opéra Comique, on 27 March 1906, she created the role of Séso in the première of Camille Erlanger's Aphrodite. In 1907, she performed at the Opéra de Monte-Carlo, first as Elena in Arrigo Boito's Mefistofele, then as Élisabeth in Verdi's Don Carlos.

In 1908, she was active both at the Teatro Regio in Parma, as Cio-Cio-San in Madam Butterfly and in the title role of Manon, and in the Opéra Garnier in Paris, as Gilda in Rigoletto and in the title role of Thaïs. At the Garnier, she went on to perform Ophelia in Ambroise Thomas's Hamlet and Merguerite in Faust (1909). In September 1911, she played the role of Salome in Hérodiade at the Théâtre de la Gaîté.

In December 1911, she went to Boston where she appeared at the Boston Opera in various roles over the next few months, including Thaïs, Marguerite, Mimi, and Manon. By 1914, she had returned to Paris where she created Messaline in Henri Hirschmann's La danseuse de Tanagra at the Théâtre de la Gaîté.

Zina Brozia died in Paris on 13 February 1958.
