= Laetitia Grimaldi =

French opera singer

- Born: Tours, France
- Education: The Juilliard School, New York City
- Occupation: Operatic soprano

Laetitia Grimaldi Spitzer is a French lyric soprano and graduate of The Juilliard School in New York City.

== Life and career ==
Born in France, Laetitia Grimaldi spent her childhood in Lisbon and London. After beginning her vocal studies with Teresa Berganza, she continued her studies in New York City, first at the Manhattan School of Music, followed by a master's degree from the Juilliard School .

During her studies at the Juilliard School, she won the first prize at the Kate Neal Kinley Memorial Competition. In parallel, she participated in masterclasses of such prestigious artists as Sir Thomas Allen, Alfred Brendel, Emma Kirkby, Ileana Cotrubaş, Thomas Quasthoff, François le Roux, Malcolm Martineau and Christian Ivaldi.

She made her Carnegie Hall debut in 2013 and has since performed at festivals such as the Verbier Festival in Switzerland, the Aix-en-Provence Festival in France, the Ravinia Festival in Chicago and the Menuhin Festival Gstaad, Switzerland.

== Awards and fellowships ==
Laetitia Grimaldi has been invited to festivals such as the Verbier Festival (Switzerland), the Aix-en-Provence Festival ( France), the Ravinia Festival Chicago (USA), the Norwich Concert Series (United Kingdom), the Menuhin Festival in Gstaad (Switzerland) and the Leipzig Music Festival (Germany).

She has received mentorship with some of the world's leading. Artists, including Dame Emma Kirkby, Illeana Cotrubas, Alfred Brendel, Teresa Berganza, Sir Thomas Allen and Masaaki Suzuki, amongst others. Since 2015, Mrs Grimaldi Spitzer has been under the mentorship of the renowned German baritone, Matthias Goerne.
