= Jean-Claude Annoux =

Jean-Claude Annoux (15 May 1939 – 2 October 2004) was a French author/composer/singer. He was known for his hit song "Aux jeunes loups" in 1965

== Biography ==
He was classically trained as a violinist and written songs for Marcel Amont and Philippe Clay.

== Songs ==
(Selective)

- "Les Touristes"
- "A la première Sophie"
- "Aux jeunes loups"
- "C'est formidable"
- "Je ne sais pas chanter les chansons d'amour"
- "Le jour de notre amour"
- "Les amants"
- "Plus heureux que le roi"
- "Vive la mariée"
- "Je suis contre"
- "Moi, ma fleur"
- "La messe de Pâques"
- "Isabelle"
- "à Bidou"
- "Gare au Show biz"
- "Brest"
- "Les Mères"
- "Un Câlin"

== Books ==
- 1993: Gare au Show biz
