= Shona (singer) =

French writer, composer and singer

- Origin: France
- Genres: Pop
- Occupation(s): Singer, songwriter, composer
- Years active: 1985–1989

Shona is a French writer, composer and singer.

== Biography ==
In 1985, she released a first single entitled "Panthère noire". Three years later, she released a single from her album Complètement mec, "Élodie mon rêve", dedicated to her niece, which hit #10 on the SNEP Top 50 and was charted for 16 weeks. Her next singles, "Au jour le jour", "Un Instant de vie" and "Les Sentiments", did not make the charts.

== Discography ==
=== Albums ===
- 1988 : Complètement mec

=== Singles ===
- 1985 : "Panthère noire"
- 1988 : "Élodie mon rêve" – #10 in France, Silver disc
- 1988 : "Au jour le jour"
- 1989 : "Un Instant de vie"
- 1989 : "Les Sentiments"
