= Les Avions =

French pop rock band

- Origin: France
- Genres: Pop
- Years active: 1980-1997
- Members: Jean-Pierre Morgand; Jean Nakache; Jérôme Lambert
- Website: Official site

Les Avions was a French pop rock band based in Paris, France, and formed by Jean-Pierre Morgand. Jean-Pierre played vocals and guitar. Jean Nakache played guitar and keyboards, and Jérôme Lambert played drums. The keyboardist Sylvain Pauchard also greatly contributed to Les Avions' albums for the arrangements and programming. The group disbanded in 1997 after an ultimate concert in Moscow on the occasion of the festival named 'Les Allumées'. Their best known song is the hit "Nuit sauvage" in 1986 (#16 in France), but few other singles of the trio also enjoyed a significant broadcasting, such as "Tu changes" (1986), "Noël (tombe la neige)" (1987) and "Tous ces visages" (1989).

== Discography ==
=== Albums ===
- 1982 : Les Avions
1. A-side : "La Planète des singes" - "Trio" - "Des Usines & des Hommes" - "Puzzle & Parallèles"
2. B-side : "Un Certain Paradis" - "Twist and Shout" - "Aquarium"
- 1987 : Fanfare
- 1989 : Loin
- 1992 : 4

=== Compilations ===
- 2002 : Des Jardins et des Ronces, le Best of des Avions

=== Singles ===
- 1982 : "Trio" / "Twist and Shout"
- 1985 : "Nuit sauvage" / "Tour Eiffel" - #16 in France
- 1986 : "Be bop" / "Guitare espagnole"
- 1987 : "Tu changes" / "Le cyrk"
- 1987 : "Tombe la neige" / "Zim bam boum"
- 1988 : "Et la fanfare des PTT" / "Medley" ("Nuit sauvage", "Be bop", "Fanfare")
- 1988 : "Fanfare"
- 1989 : "Tous ces visages" / "Le Train"
- 1992 : "Mélodie"
- 1992 : "Monsieur Moyen"
