= Michou (Réunion singer) =

Michou (Saint-Denis, Réunion, 9 August 1960) is a Réunion singer. Daughter of the Réunionnais composer Narmine Ducap, she had her first séga hit in 1972 at the age of 12. After a long career, and many hit singles, with various bands she issued solo albums in the 1990s.

== Discography ==
Singles:

- Viens dors dans mon dos; Séga klaxon; Route en corniche; Papa Noël, AS AS3010 (accompagnement : Narmine Ducap & Max Dormeuil).
- Larobée; Crasé salle verte, Jackman J40118 (accompagnement : Les Dièses).
- Garde moi; P'tit l'ambiance, Jackman J40268.
- Cafrine; La Rake mon bon Dieu; Ti planteur la Réunion; Séga samedi soir, Issa I15016.
- Ca un affaire ça; L'Amour y fait mal, Issa I4051 (accompagnement : Les Dièses).
- Bouscule, bouscule pas; Femme à pic, Issa I4054 (accompagnement : Les Dièses).
- Carnaval la plaine; Toi ma petite île, Issa I4072, 1976 (accompagnement : Les Dièses).
- Michou; Zordi ton fête maman, Issa I4094, 1976
- Un Crasé longtemps; Régime télé couleur, Issa I6013 (accompagnement : Les Soul Men).
- Cyclone cyclone arrête; Jamais na kité, Issa I6014 (accompagnement : Les Soul Men).
- Vivre sans toi jamais; Ti pays regretté, Issa I6034 (accompagnement : Les Soul Men).
- Mam'zelle Paula; Vive la pluie, Royal DR770001, 1978.
- Maloya ton tisane; Mariage Fanny, Royal DR770010.
- Largu' la sauce; Tombé levé, Royal DR770018, 1978 (accompagnement : Les Caméléons).
- Maloya bibi; Mi vois bébête, Royal DR770060, 1979.
- Bougr' libertin; Maximin mon coco, Piros P5031, 1980.
- Toine, Antoine; Pays kalou, Piros P5044.
- Crédo vidéo; Grillé l'année, Piros P5090.
- Solo maloya; Roi gamère, Piros P5102.
- Clotilde; Cœur fané, 102FM 102P8703, 1987.

Albums:

- Tombé levé, Royal DR770019, 1978 (accompagnement : Les Caméléons).
- Purgatoire créole, Piros, 1991.
- Piments bien forts, Sonodisc, 1998.
- Fantaisie créole, Piros, 1999.
- Best of, Discorama, 2005.
- Sandragon 2008
- Michou - 35 Ans Séga, 2CD 2012
