= Germaine Cernay =

French mezzo-soprano (1900–1943)

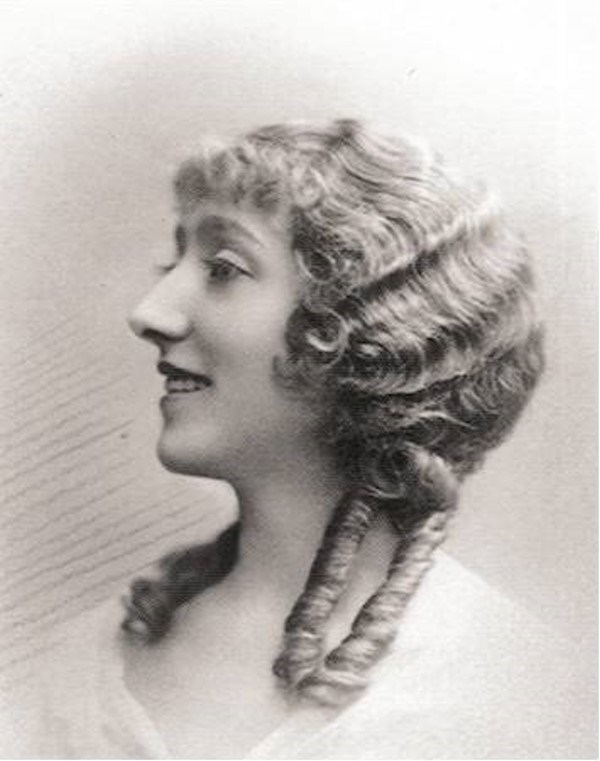
Germaine Cernay

Germaine Pointu (28 April 1900 in Le Havre – 19 September 1943 in Paris), known as Germaine Cernay, was a French mezzo-soprano who was active both in the opera house and on the concert platform.

== Life and career ==
Cernay studied the piano before entering the Conservatoire de Paris for vocal studies under Albers and Engel, winning first prizes in 1925.

She made her debut at the Opéra-Comique in Paris on 16 May 1927 as la Bossue in the Paris premiere of Alfano's Risurrezione (in French). Other creations at the Salle Favart were Floriane in Éros Vainqueur (de Bréville), la Tour in Le Fou de la Dame (Delannoy), a fairy in Riquet a la Houppe (Hue), and Léonor in Le Sicilien (Letorey). Her other principal roles at the Opéra-Comique included Sélysette (Ariane et Barbe-bleue), a sister (Béatrice), Gertrude (Le roi Dagobert), la fantôme (Les Contes d'Hoffmann), Mallika (Lakmé), Javotte (Manon), title role in Mignon, Souzouki (Madame Butterfly), Vincenette/Taven (Mireille), Geneviève (Pelléas et Mélisande), Cléone (Pénélope), Charlotte (Werther) and one of the voices in Masques et bergamasques.

She was invited to many provincial centres in France and also appeared in North Africa, Switzerland, Belgium, England, Ireland and Italy.

Broadcasting on French radio allowed Cernay to enlarge her repertoire to roles in Carmen, Le roi d'Ys, Le Chemineau, La damnation de Faust, Don Quichotte and La Lépreuse. She also sang in the first performance of surviving fragments of Chabrier's Vaucochard et fils Ier on 22 April 1941 at the Salle du Conservatoire.

Cernay was one of the best-known concert altos of her generation and highly considered as a Bach interpreter.

She appeared regularly with the Orchestre de la Societe des Concerts du Conservatoire from 1931 to 1942. Her first and last appearances with the orchestra were as alto soloist in the Bach Magnificat, and in 1936 she sang in two performances of the Mass in B minor. Other works in which she sang at the concerts included Trois Duos by Raymond Loucheur, an excerpt from Couronnement de Poppée, Trois Poèmes by Philippe Gaubert, the Duo from Béatrice et Bénédict, Duos by Dandelot (premiere), Szymanowski's Stabat mater, excerpts from Prométhée, Le Martyre de Saint Sébastien, Jeanne d'Arc (oratorio in seven parts by Louis Beydts, George Dandelot, Loucheur, Tony Aubin, Jacques Chailley, Pierre Capdevielle, and André Jolivet), and the Mozart Requiem. She retired in 1942 to become a nun. A year later she died of status epilepticus.

== Discography ==
Cernay's many recordings, made from February 1928 to June 1942, for Odéon and Columbia, include:

- Bach – Christmas Oratorio: "Bereite dich, Zion" (cantata for the 14th Sunday after Trinity)
- Berlioz – "L'Absence"; La Damnation de Faust: "Il était un roi de Thulé", "D'amour l'ardente flamme"
- Bizet – Carmen: "L'amour est enfant de bohême", Quintet, Seguidilla, "Les tringles des sistres tintaient", "Mêlons ! Coupons !"; complete opera (from radio broadcast, title role)
- Borodin – Prince Igor: "Lentement baisse le jour", "Sur la terre lasse"
- Brahms – op. 91 no. 1 and 2
- Charpentier – Louise: "L'enfant serait sage", "Ah ! N'est-ce plus mon enfant", "Ô jolie", "Il va venir bientôt", "Ô mon enfant, o ma Louise"
- Dandelot – "Chanson de Bilitis"
- Debussy – Pelléas et Mélisande (as Geneviève); L'Enfant prodigue: Azaël aria and récit
- Delibes – Lakmé: "Sous le dôme épais" (with soprano Solange Delmas)
- Duparc – "Le Manoir de Rosemonde" (with pianist Gustave Cloëz)
- Fauré – "En Prière", "Un Parfum impérissable", "Pleurs d'or", op. 72, Tarantella, op. 10 no. 2, "Salve Regina"; Pénélope: "C'est sur ce banc", "Je l'attends", "Minerve le protège"; Cantique de Jean Racine
- Ganne – Les Saltimbanques: "C'est l'amour"
- Godard – Jocelyn: "Berceuse"
- Gounod – Faust: "Faites-lui mes aveux"; Mireille: "Vincenette, votre âge"
- Grieg – Peer Gynt: "Solvejgs sang"
- Hüe – "Nous deux" (with pianist Gustave Cloëz)
- Lalo – Le Roi d'Ys: "Air de Margared", "Margared, ô ma sœur" (with soprano Bernadette Delprat)
- Lecocq – La Fille de Madame Angot: "Voyons, monsieur, raisonnons politique"; "Des Lettres" (with tenor Victor Pujol)
- Lehár – The Merry Widow: "Chanson de Vylja", "Je ne connais votre Jeanette", "Heure exquise", Act 1 final, "C'est la valse"
- Mascagni – Cavalleria rusticana (as Santuzza; with tenor Gaston Micheletti, baritone Arthur Endrèze, soprano Alice Hena and contralto Mady Arty)
- Massenet – Sapho: "Air de la Lampe"; Werther (as Charlotte): "Prière", "Air des lettres", "Oui, c'est moi" (with tenor Charles Friant), "Albert est de retour", "Mort de Werther", "Air je dit vrai", "Va ! Laisse couler mes larmes", "Ah ! Ce premier baiser"; Hérodiade: "Ne me refuse pas"; Thérèse: "Le devoir", "Jour de juin, tour d'été", "Oui je t'aime André, je te vénère"; Don Quichotte: "J'ai bien assez de mon tristesse", "Oui je souffre votre tristesse", "Marchez dans mon chemin", "Quand apparaissent les étoiles" (with baritone Roger Bourdin); Le Cid: "Pleurez, pleurez mes yeux"
- Mozart – The Marriage of Figaro: "Aprite, presto, aprite" (with soprano Emma Luart)
- Offenbach – The Tales of Hoffmann: "Barcarolle" (with soprano Emma Luart)
- Planquette – Rip Van Winkle: "Si je la veux, immense richesse"
- Puccini – Madama Butterfly: "Sur ma joue, la brise", "Jetons comme à brassées" (with soprano Emma Luart)
- Rachmaninoff – "Lilacs", "Rose and the Nightingale" (with pianist Gustave Cloëz)
- Ravel – L'Enfant et les Sortilèges (excerpts)
- Renauld – "Pater noster", "Ave Maria"
- Saint-Saëns – Samson and Delilah: "Printemps qui commence", "Samson toi mon bien", "Se pourrait-il ?" (with tenor Georges Thill); La Cloche
- Schütz – "Exauce-moi" (with soprano Martha Angelici)
- Thomas – Mignon: "Connais-tu le pays ?", "Elle est là", "Près de lui", "Romance de Mignon", "As-tu souffert, as-tu pleuré ?", "Ô Vierge Marie", "Je suis heureuse", "Duo des hirondelles", Styrienne, "Légères hirondelles"
- Wagner – "Träume"
