= Gustave Cloëz =

French conductor (1890–1970)

Gustave Cloëz (3 August 1890 – 15 March 1970) was a French conductor who was particularly active at the Paris Opéra-Comique in the mid-20th century, and made a significant number of recordings, often accompanying major singers of the time.

== Life and career ==
Cloëz was born in Cuincy to Henri Cloëz and Nellie Lecomte. He studied at the Paris Conservatoire, with Charles-Wilfrid de Bériot and Lazare Lévy (piano).

Cloëz made his conducting debut at the Paris Opéra-Comique with Manon on 1 August 1922 and continued at the theatre for 25 years. Premieres at the Salle Favart conducted by him include le Fou de la Dame (1930 world premiere, music by Delannoy), Rayon de Soieries (1930 world premiere, Rosenthal), Mon Ami Pierrot (1935 world premiere, Barlow), Le Couronnement de Poppée, Zadig (1938 world premiere, Jean Dupérier), Mesdames de la Halle, Mon oncle Benjamin (1942 world premiere, Francis Bousquet), and le Directeur de Théâtre. He was also in charge of revivals of Angélique, La Basoche, Le Roi Dagobert, Djamileh, Le Jongleur de Notre-Dame, La Lépreuse, Pelléas et Mélisande (1932), Quand la cloche sonnera and Résurrection. His first appearance conducting an opera at the Palais Garnier was in Faust on 1 July 1939.

He was an experienced ballet conductor, and among those which he conducted at the Opéra-Comique, some of which were world premieres, were Deuxième Rhapsodie (Liszt, 1937), La Précaution Inutile (1946), La Bourrée Fantasque (1946), Danse du Marin (music from Félicien David, 1946), Casse-Noisette (2nd Act, 1947), Concerto de Prokofiev (based on his third piano concerto, 1947), La Belle au Bois Dormant (divertisement, 1947), Khamma (1947), Roméo et Juliette (music by Tchaikovsky, 1947) and La Rose Rouge (1947).

He conducted the orchestra for the Compagnie d'Ida Rubinstein seasons at the Opéra de Paris from the late 1920s, leading the premieres of Les Enchantements d'Alcine (music by Auric, choreography by Massine), La Valse (Ravel, Nijinska) in 1929, Amphion (Honegger, Massine) in 1931, and Diane de Poitiers (Ibert, Fokine), and Sémiramis (Honegger, Fokine) in 1934.

Having conducted for them in Brussels in 1947 and 1948, Cloëz worked for the International Ballet of the Marquis de Cuevas from 1955 to 1957. During 1941 to 1945 he conducted several concerts of the Paris Conservatoire Orchestra, a notable event being one in aid of the war-ravaged villages of Alsace on 22 May 1945 at the Théâtre des Champs-Élysées (Bach, Beethoven, Respighi). He is credited with arrangements of Debussy's Petite Suite, and of three movements of Suite bergamasque for the ballet L'ange gris.

== Recordings ==
Cloëz worked extensively for the Odéon company in the 1930s, providing accompaniments to famous singers of the time: Emma Luart, Ninon Vallin, Germaine Cernay, Charles Friant, David Devriès, Arthur Endrèze and André Pernet. He also conducted excerpts from Carmen with Conchita Supervia in the title role, some Spanish popular song recordings with her, and excerpts from Tosca in French with Vallin, Di Mazzei and Endrèze. He also released some early records of rare baroque music by Destouches and Mouret, with the Orchestre de la société des Concerts de Versailles and the soprano Martha Angelici (Callirhoé and Les Fêtes de Thalie).

Radio recordings transferred to CD include André Messager's Béatrice from 1957 and the Strauss arrangement of Mozart's Idomeneo from 1960.

Purely orchestral records by Cloëz include 'Intermezzo' by Georges Hugon (Orchestre des Concerts Symphoniques), Liszt Piano Concerto No. 2 and Hungarian Fantasy (Orchestre national de la Radiodiffusion Française, Raymond Trouard), Schobert's Concerto in G for harpsichord and orchestra (Ruggero Gerlin), Mozart's Concerto for Flute and Harp (with Gaston Crunelle, Pierre Jamet), the Hebrides Overture and Danse Macabre. Orchestral extracts from operas with the Opéra-Comique Orchestra covered Borodin Prince Igor Polovtsian Dances, Debussy L'Enfant Prodigue and Massenet Manon ballet music, as well as music by Bruneau and Wagner.
