= Marcel Samuel-Rousseau =

French composer, organist and opera director (1882-1955)

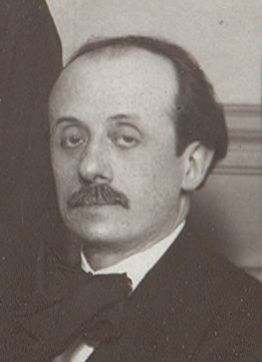
Samuel-Rousseau (1930) - detail from L. Roosen (photogr) Conservatoire national de musique: Album-photos des classes 1929-30 - Harmonie. Mr S.M. Rousseau

Marcel Auguste Louis Samuel-Rousseau (né Rousseau; 18 August 1882 – 11 June 1955) was a French composer, organist, and opera director.

== Life and career ==
Born in Paris, he was the son of Samuel Rousseau and later changed his surname to Samuel-Rousseau to reflect this. He studied composition at the Paris Conservatoire and was awarded the Prix de Rome in 1905. He married on 4 March 1907 in the 9^{me} arrondissement. He was the organist at Saint-Séverin from 1919 to 1922 and president of the Société des auteurs, compositeurs et éditeurs de musique (SACEM) from 1935 to 1953. For many years he was a professor of harmony at the Paris Conservatoire and artistic director of the Pathé opera company. He was the father of Prix de Rome laureate Éveline Plicque-Andréani. From 1941 to 1944 he was director of the Paris Opéra.

He died in Paris in 1955, aged 72.

== Works ==
As a composer, Samuel-Rousseau was highly influenced by the works of Franck and Fauré. He tended to be more conservative in style than many of his contemporaries but he was a master at chromatic harmony and had a strong sense for the dramatic. His compositions include operas, ballets, orchestral and piano music and songs.

His best works are his operas, which tend towards the exotic and are ambitious in scale. His first opera, Le Roi Arthur, was based on the legend of King Arthur and given a concert performance at the Conservatoire on 8 November 1903. His second, Tarass Boulba, was based on the legend of a Cossack warrior and performed at the Théâtre du Vaudeville, beginning on 22 November 1919.

Le Hulla, a four-act conte-lyrique-orental with words by André Rivoire, was premiered on 9 March 1923 by the Opéra-Comique at the Salle Favart in a production by Albert Carré. The performances were conducted by Albert Wolff; Yvonne Brothier sang Dilara, and Charles Friant, Narsès. The opera included a Persian dance choreographed by Louise Stichel and danced by Mona Païva. It was revived in 1926 and performed a total of 44 times by the company.

Le bon roi Dagobert, a four-act comédie musicale with words by André Rivoire, based on his 1908 play with the same title, was presented by the Opéra-Comique at the Salle Favart beginning on 5 December 1927. Emma Luart sang La Reine, Charles Friant was Dagobert, and Louis Fourestier conducted. The opera was revived in a new production by Max de Rieux in 1938, 1939, and 1943, with Vina Bovy as the Queen and Louis Arnoult as Dagobert, by which time it had been performed a total of 72 times by the company.

His one-act opera Kerkeb, with a libretto by Michel Carré (based on a novel by Elissa Rhaïs), was premiered on 6 April 1951 by the Opéra at the Palais Garnier. The title role, a Berber dancer in a harem, was sung by Géori Boué, and Roger Bourdin sang Sid-Haffid. The performances were conducted by Louis Fourestier. The opera was revived in 1956 with Suzanne Sarroca in the title role. The opera had been performed a total of 26 times by the company by its last performance on 12 July 1958.

== Bibliography ==
- Griffiths, Paul; Richard Langham Smith (1992). "Samuel-Rousseau [Rousseau], Marcel [Louis Auguste]", vol. 4, p. 161, in The New Grove Dictionary of Opera, edited by Stanley Sadie, ISBN 0-333-73432-7 and ISBN 1-56159-228-5. Online version updated 26 October 2011.
- Wild, Nicole; Charlton, David (2005). Théâtre de l'Opéra-Comique Paris: répertoire 1762-1972. Sprimont, Belgium: Editions Mardaga. ISBN 9782870098981.
- Wolff, Stéphane (1953). Un demi-siècle d'Opéra-Comique (1900-1950). Paris: André Bonne. OCLC 44733987, 2174128, 78755097
- Wolff, Stéphane (1962). L'Opéra au Palais Garnier (1875–1962). Paris: Deposé au journal L'Entr'acte. OCLC 7068320, 460748195. Paris: Slatkine (1983 reprint) ISBN 9782050002142.
