= John Dew (director) =

British opera director

John Dew (born 1944) is a British opera director. He was the artistic director of the Staatstheater Darmstadt.

== Biography ==
Dew was born in 1944 in Santiago de Cuba, but later moved to England at age three. He studied at the Pratt Institute in New York City where he gained a Bachelor of Arts degree, after which he was apprenticed to Walter Felsenstein and Wieland Wagner. In 1969 to 1976 he worked as assistant producer in Osnabrück and Ulm, his first production being De Grandes's Eduward and Kenegunde in Ulm.

His freelance work from 1977 to 1982 took him to Kiel, Mannheim, Hanover and Basel where he mounted several productions, as well as a Ring cycle and various Mozart operas in Krefeld.

In 1982, he was appointed director of productions and artistic director of the Bielefeld Opera where he remained until 1995. His work there included a cycle of 40 so-called Entartete works - rediscovered works which had been banned by the Nazis.

After 1986, he directed productions at the Deutsche Oper Berlin, the Staatsoper Hamburg, the Royal Opera House Covent Garden, the Houston Grand Opera, the Wiener Staatsoper, the Badische Staatsoper, Oper Leipzig, the Opera Comique, the Zurich Opera, Teatro Real Madrid, Gothenburg Opera and the State Opera Prague.

He was artistic director at the Theater Dortmund from 1995 to 2001. His work there included a cycle of French operas including Gustave Charpentier's Louise and Julien, Meyerbeer's Dinorah, Bloch's Macbeth, Berlioz' Les Troyens, Roussel's Padmâvatî, and Halévy's La Juive.

In 2009, Dew staged Wagner's Lohengrin at the Stadttheater Minden, with the Nordwestdeutsche Philharmonie conducted by Frank Beermann.

== Awards and honors ==
In appreciation for his services to the French nation, he has been honored with the title ‘Officier de l´Ordre des Arts et des Lettres’. In 2012 he was awarded the Carl Orff prize for his dedication to producing the works of Carl Orff, in particular the opera Gisei, which was a world premiere, staged at the Staatstheater Darmstadt in 2010.
