= Germaine Lubin =

French dramatic soprano

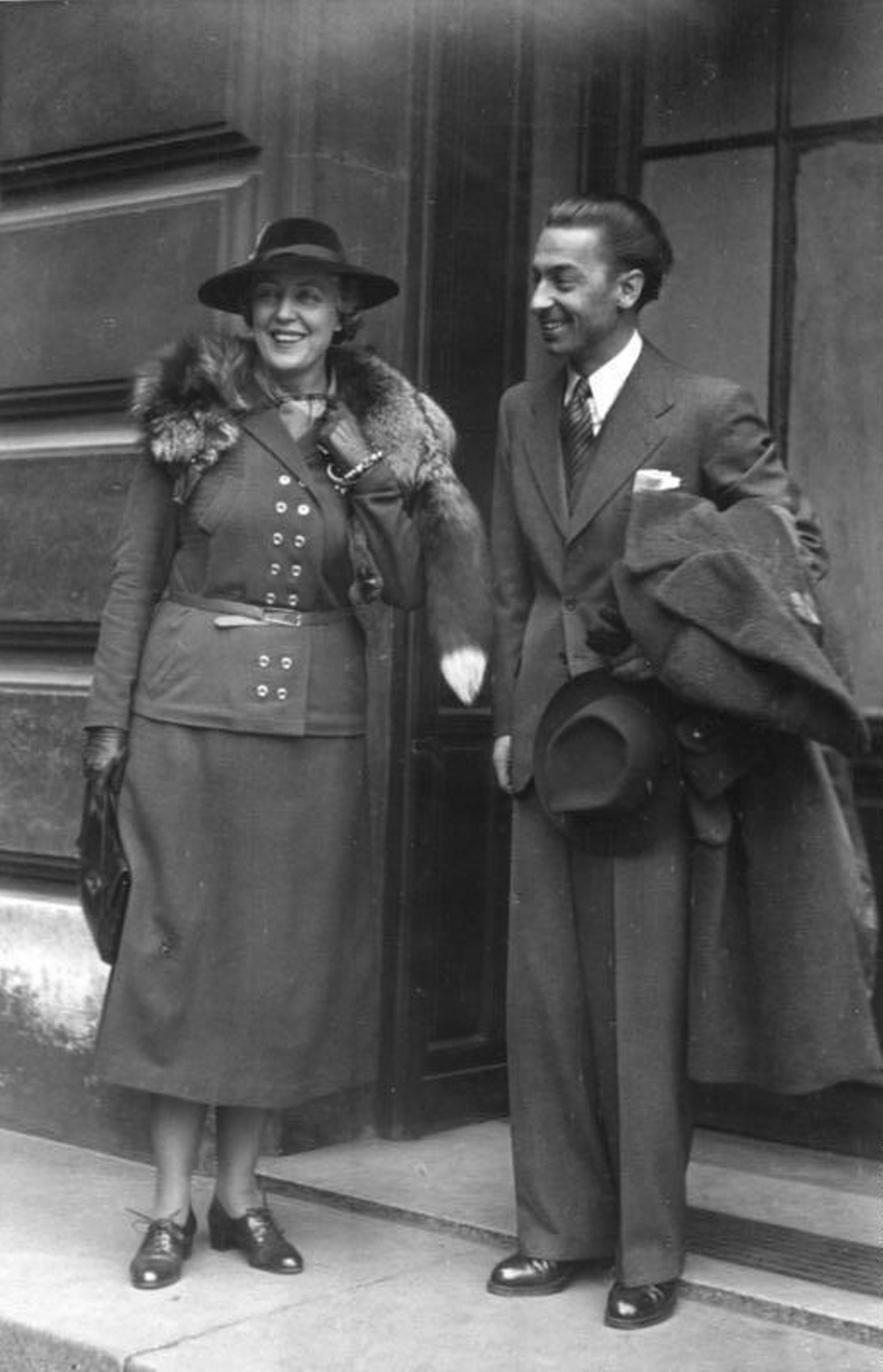
Germaine Lubin and Herbert von Karajan, 17 May 1941 at the stage door of the Paris Opéra

Germaine Léontine Angélique Lubin (1 February 1890 – 27 October 1979) was a French dramatic soprano, best known for her association with the music of Richard Wagner. She possessed a brilliant voice but her later career was tainted with accusations of Nazi sympathies.

== Biography ==
=== Training ===
Born in Paris, Germaine Lubin was soon taken to Cayenne in French Guiana where her father was a doctor, and from him she received her first piano lessons. She returned to live in Paris at the age of eight, and attended the Collège Sévigné with the intent of studying to become a doctor. Instead, in 1908 she entered the Paris Conservatory, where Gabriel Fauré was then the director. Fauré formed a high opinion of her voice —and her statuesque beauty— and would accompany her personally in performances of his songs. She left the Conservatory in 1912 after winning three first prizes for her singing, and she was immediately in demand for performances. Throughout most of her career however she continued to take voice lessons, studying for 10 years from 1912 with the Franco-Russian soprano Félia Litvinne. She would later work on roles with Lilli Lehmann and Marie Gutheil-Schoder. She also studied with Jean de Reszke, although she felt that he taught her little.

=== Career ===
In 1912 she made her debut at the Opéra-Comique, singing Antonia in The Tales of Hoffmann, to an audience which included Claude Debussy and Paul Dukas, and she enjoyed a great success. At the Opéra-Comique, Albert Carré gave her the chance to appear in several contemporary operas, including Gabriel Fauré's Pénélope (title role). She also sang Charlotte in Jules Massenet's Werther and the title role in Gustave Charpentier's Louise, and appeared in the world premiere of Le Pays by Guy Ropartz.

In 1913 Lubin married the French poet Paul Géraldy. A son, Claude, was born to them in 1916. Their marriage lasted until 1926. (In 1918, Lubin met Marshal Philippe Pétain and they conducted a warm correspondence for a while; Pétain declared a wish to marry her, had she been free. Lubin would remain an ardent admirer of Pétain until his death in 1951.)

Lubin made her first appearance at the Paris Opéra in 1915, in Vincent d'Indy's Le Chant de la cloche, and continued to sing there for nearly 30 years. In addition to standard French works, she also found success in the operas of Christoph Willibald Gluck and Richard Strauss, singing the first French performances of Elektra in 1932. She also created roles for d'Indy, Darius Milhaud, and Henri Sauguet (La chartreuse de Parme) and sang the title role in the 1935 revival of Ariane et Barbe-bleue by Dukas, with which she made her debut at Covent Garden, returning for Isolde and Kundry in 1939.

In 1921 Lubin embarked on the series of Wagner roles for which she would be most admired: first Sieglinde in Die Walküre, then Elsa (Lohengrin), and finally Eva (Die Meistersinger), all sung in French at the Opéra. Later came Brünnhilde (Der Ring des Nibelungen) (1928) and Kundry (Parsifal) (1938).

She performed Ariadne under Strauss in Vienna, also singing Octavian and Agathe to critical enthusiasm, later taking part in the Paris premieres of Der Rosenkavalier in 1927 and Ariadne auf Naxos at the Opéra-Comique in 1943.

In 1930 she sang the role of Isolde (Tristan und Isolde) at the Paris Opéra for the first time and met with an ecstatic reception. Her physical beauty —she was tall, slim and blonde— and her strong, even voice made her ideal for the part. She went on to sing it again in Paris in 1938 (this time in German, conducted by Wilhelm Furtwängler), and in London in 1939 (at the invitation of Sir Thomas Beecham). In July 1939 she became the first Frenchwoman to sing Isolde at Bayreuth (under the baton of Victor de Sabata). At Bayreuth, she established friendships with members of the Wagner family. She was even complimented by Adolf Hitler, who said she was the finest Isolde that he had heard.

Lubin hoped to sing also at the Metropolitan Opera in New York City, having been recommended to the Met's management by Kirsten Flagstad. However, she terminated her contract weeks before arrival, and never sang in the United States.

=== World War II ===
After the German occupation of Paris in 1940, Jacques Rouché sought to re-open the Opéra and invited Lubin to return to sing Alceste. This was followed by performances of Fidelio and Der Rosenkavalier, and in 1941 she again sang Isolde, this time with the visiting company of the Staatsoper from Berlin under the direction of Herbert von Karajan. She continued to associate with German acquaintances, and in 1942 she performed at a concert to mark an exhibition by Arno Breker, the sculptor who was closely associated with the Nazi leadership. (She later said that she had agreed to this performance as part of a deal to secure the release of Maurice Franck, the Jewish "chef de chant", or music staff/vocal coach, at the Opéra.)

These activities brought Germaine Lubin under suspicion of collaboration with the Nazis, and after the Liberation in 1944 she was arrested and imprisoned. At her trial in 1946, she was acquitted of the accusation after a number of testimonials were produced from people she had helped during the war. Nevertheless, she was sentenced to "dégradation nationale" for life (subsequently reduced to five years), confiscation of property, and "interdiction de séjour" (a form of exile). She found refuge with friends in Italy.

For her part, Lubin denied all ties to Nazi Germany, and grew deeply bitter over her treatment at the hands of the French government. She once said that

I have suffered an enormous injustice. They curtailed my career by ten years — my own people! The fact is that I knew some of the Germans when they came to Paris during the occupation. This gave my enemies the chance to satisfy their envy … If I saw the Germans in Paris —and they had been more than kind to me— it was to save my compatriots. It was my way of serving my country at that particular moment. Nobody knows how many prisoners I had released … When I spent three years in prison, they confiscated my château at Tours and my possessions. Did anyone bother to ask me why I did not accept Winifred Wagner’s invitations to sing in Germany during the occupation? But my trial was a complete vindication: I was completely cleared. Yes, they gave back most of what they had taken …

=== Later years ===
In 1950 Germaine Lubin had returned to Paris and sought to resume her career with a recital. Although she met with some sympathy and gave a few further performances, it was a difficult transition, and when in 1953 her son committed suicide she abandoned public performance entirely. For the remainder of her life she became a voice teacher, giving lessons at her home on the Quai Voltaire in Paris. Among her notable pupils was the leading soprano Régine Crespin. Lubin died in Paris in 1979 at the age of 89.

Lubin had a powerful voice of gleaming tonal splendour. By her own admission she was a forceful and demanding personality, often haughty and distant with other people, and she responded to the heroic dimension of the characters that she portrayed on the operatic stage. "I do not like to sing the role of victims", she said in an interview.

== Recordings ==
Although Germaine Lubin became the foremost French dramatic soprano during the 1920s and '30s, and indeed one of the finest opera singers to be heard anywhere during the inter-war period, her performances are not particularly well represented on disc. She recorded in 1929–30 a number of excerpts from her central repertoire, notably her Wagnerian roles as well as Tosca, Der Freischütz and Sigurd. She also recorded a few songs by Schubert, Schumann and her erstwhile admirer Fauré. Among her later recordings from 1944 are two of the earliest featuring the young Gérard Souzay in which they perform duets by Leguerney and Blangini. In the 1950s, she also recorded a couple of songs by Hugo Wolf. In total her recorded legacy amounts to about two dozen items, many of which are available on CD reissues.
