= Depuis le jour =

Depuis le jour may refer to:

- Depuis le jour (encyclical), an 1899 encyclical of Pope Leo XIII on the education of the clergy
- "Depuis le jour", the most famous aria from Louise (opera) (Gustave Charpentier, 1900)
