= André Pernet =

French opera singer

André Pernet (6 January 1894 – 17 June 1966) was a French bass-baritone opera performer.

After serving as a military officer in World War I, Pernet studied at the Paris Conservatory before making his operatic debut in Massenet's Hérodiade at Nice, in 1921. He sang at the Paris Opéra beginning in 1928. He also performed in Amsterdam, Brussels, London and Monte Carlo.

He is perhaps best remembered today for his role as the father in the 1939 film version of Gustave Charpentier's Louise, directed by Abel Gance and also featuring Grace Moore and Georges Thill. He was noted for singing the title parts in Mefistofele, Boris Godunov, Don Giovanni and Don Quichotte. Among the operas in which he created roles during the premiere performances were Le marchand de Venise (Hahn), Oedipe (Enesco), Maximilien (Milhaud) and Vercingétorix (Canteloube).

Pernet's smooth, elegant, well-produced voice can be heard on a number of recordings which he made between the two world wars. Some of his records are available on CD re-issues.
