= Marie-Ange Todorovitch =

French mezzo-soprano

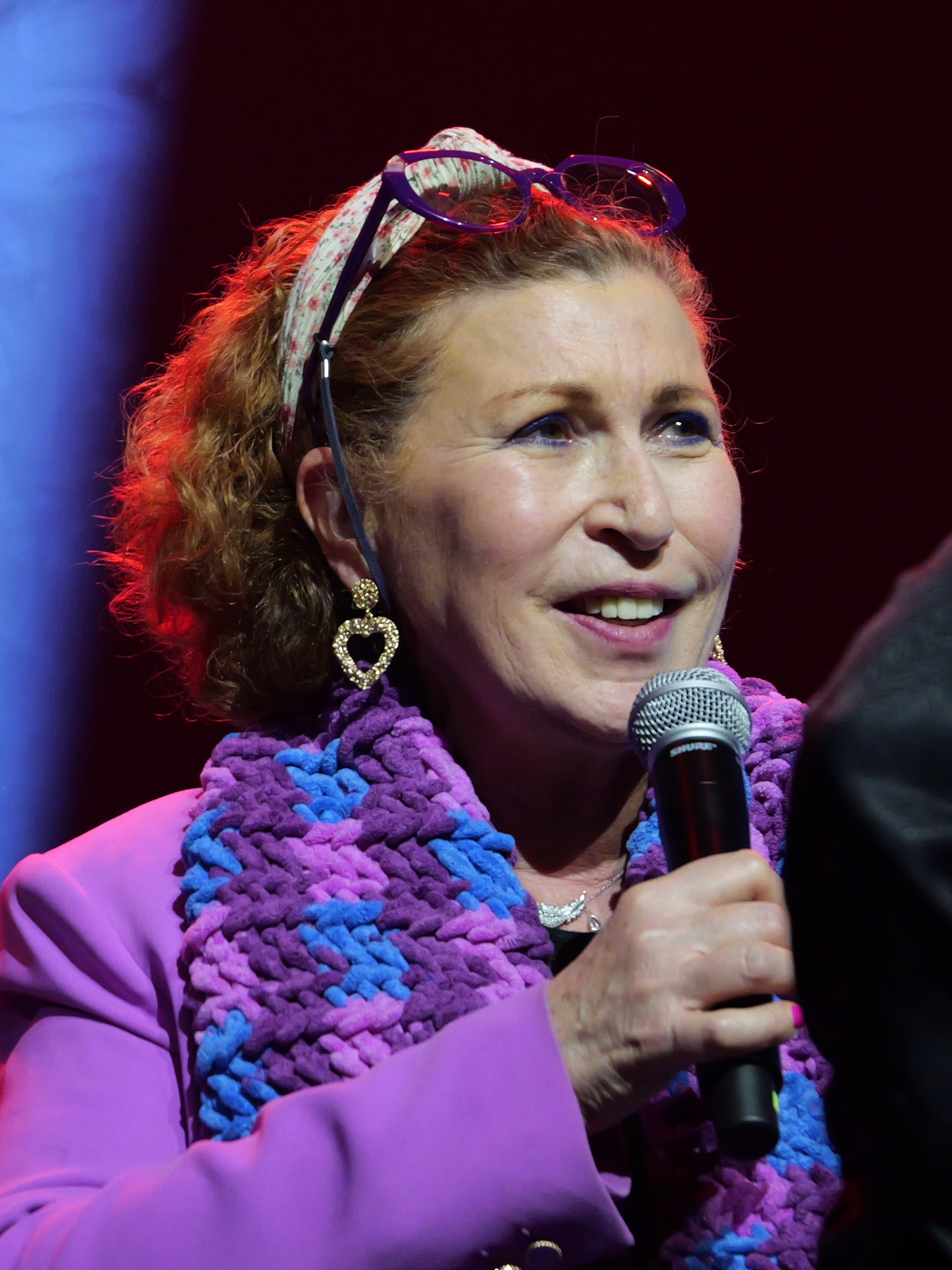
Marie-Ange Todorovitch in 2025

Marie-Ange Todorovitch is a contemporary French mezzo-soprano born in Montpellier.

== Roles ==
- 2000: La Belle Hélène: Oreste, at the Théâtre du Châtelet in Paris
- 2000: The Tales of Hoffmann: Giulietta, Grand Théâtre de Genève and Opéra de Monte-Carlo (2010)
- 2006: Carmen, Opéra national de Montpellier, Doha and Opéra de Massy (2011)
- 2010: Louise: the mother, Opéra national du Rhin
- 2010: L'Homme de la Mancha: Aldonza, Capitole de Toulouse
- 2010: Der Fliegende Holländer: Mary, Opéra Bastille
- 2010: Hamlet: la reine Gertrude, Opéra de Marseille and Strasbourg Opera House (2011)
- 2011: Rigoletto: Maddalena, Opéra de Monte-Carlo and Chorégies d'Orange
- 2011: Faust: dame Marthe, Opéra Bastille
- 2011: La Chartreuse de Parme: Gina, Opéra de Marseille
- 2014: Colomba (world premiere): Colomba, Opéra de Marseille, West pier (world premiere) Opéra du Rhin
- 2015: Die Eroberung von Mexico (Salzburger Festpielhaus), Wozzeck (Margret), Scala de Milan
