= The Charterhouse of Parma (disambiguation) =

The Charterhouse of Parma is an 1839 French novel by Stendhal.

The Charterhouse of Parma may also refer to:

- The Charterhouse of Parma (film), 1948 French-Italian film
- La chartreuse de Parme (opera), first performed in 1939
