= Suzanne Balguerie =

French operatic singer (1888–1973)

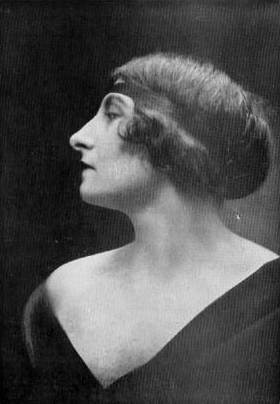
Suzanne Balguerie in 1925

Suzanne Berchut, called Suzanne Balguerie (29 June 1888 – 17 February 1973) was a French operatic singer (dramatic soprano). Admired by Fauré, Dukas, Poulenc, and Messiaen, she was one of the greatest sopranos of the interwar period.

== Life ==
Born in Le Havre, Balguerie studied singing at the Conservatoire de Paris. She first became known through concerts, which allowed her to interpret the modern music that interested her most. She died in Saint-Martin-d'Hères on 17 February 1973 at age 84.

== Ariane ==
In 1921, at the Opéra-Comique, for her first appearance on stage, Balguerie played Ariane in Dukas' Ariane et Barbe-Bleue. Her performance won praise from Gabriel Fauré who said : "I don't think there is a more important role for the theatre, both in terms of its proportions and in terms of all the qualities it demands. Mrs. Balguerie emerged from the ordeal triumphantly. [...][She] possesses, at the same time as a beautiful warm, well timbred, extended voice, a sure voice, and, rare quality, a very remarkable verbal articulation. [...][She] played this role of Ariane whose nuances are infinite, with a truly remarkable accuracy and simplicity".

André Tubeuf writes: "Her Ariane is that of a prodigious singer who masters the impossible equation of making the words [...] all the more intelligible, luminescent even as the range warms up and lights up too" and Jean-Charles Hoffelé: "It should not be forgotten that the absolute Ariade was Suzanne Balguerie, trained at the Gluckist school for whom the word is everything".

Balguerie then made a career at the Opéra-Comique. She played Donna Anna in Don Giovanni, the countess in The Marriage of Figaro, Tosca and Mélisande. In 1923, she appeared in Fauré's Penelope. She first sang the role in 1931. "As pertains Pénélope's role, Mrs. Balguerie was simply sublime," wrote Francis Poulenc.

== Isolde ==
In 1925, Albert Carré, the director of the Opéra-Comique, scheduled Tristan und Isolde for Balguerie. As with Ariane, it was a triumph: "Madame Balguerie, feline, passionate, a sorceress... with a prodigious voice, is the Wagnerian Isolde herself". Balguerie sang Isolde 275 times.

== Premieres ==
On 21 March 1919, in the bookshop of Adrienne Monnier rue de l'Odéon, she sang a sneak preview of Satie's Socrate, accompanied at the piano by the composer, in front of an audience including Gide, Claudel, Derain, Braque, Picasso, Cocteau, Francis Jammes, and the musicians of Les Six.

In 1936, Balguerie premiered two of the Poèmes pour Mi by Messiaen. "She did it with extraordinary vocal power and dramatic intensity", wrote the composer, who was at the piano. The same year, Adrien Rougier dedicated two of his Trois mélodies sur des poèmes d’Albert Samain, pour soprano et piano to her.

At the Opéra-Comique, Balguerie premiered works that are not very popular today. In 1922, Jean Cras' Polyphème and Alfred Bachelet's Quand la cloche sonnera. In 1923, La Brebis égarée, Darius Milhaud's first opera, with a libretto by Francis Jammes. In 1924, Henri Rabaud's L'Appel de la mer. In 1927, Balguerie premiered Léo Sachs Les Burgraves at the Théâtre des Champs-Élysées which she then revived at the Opéra Garnier.

At the Opéra Garnier, in 1923, she sang the role of Brünnhilde. In 1932, she premiered Alfred Bachelet's Un jardin sur l'Oronte, and, in 1934, Georges Martin Witkowski's La Princesse lointaine, with a libretto by Edmond Rostand. She also performed as Marguerite in a series of Faust. In 1944, at Bordeaux, she premiered Richard Strauss' Die ägyptische Helena in France.

== Concerts ==
Balguerie's concert activity far exceeded her operatic performances. She performed frequently with leading French orchestras, also in Switzerland, very regularly, with Ernest Ansermet. At recitals, she performed cycles such as Fauré's La Bonne Chanson, and also classical and contemporary melodies. She gave a series of concerts with Francis Poulenc and Pierre Bernac.

The choice of this repertoire was controversial. At the performance of Darius Milhaud's La Brebis égarée in 1923: "The police intervened and stopped the music. Wolff yelled at the audience", wrote the composer to his friend Francis Poulenc.

Under the occupation by Nazi Germany, engagements were scarce; she found herself in poverty when she retired in 1950. In 1953, she was appointed professor at the Conservatoire de Grenoble and at Geneva.

== Her personality ==
The singer Madeleine Grey said: "There was one I loved most of all, Suzanne Balguerie. We cannot forget the way she sang Ariane, by Dukas. She was by no means jealous. She wanted me to replace her when she was unavailable. She was a first-class artist. I was absolutely dazzled. She had everything, this woman. First she was a great, great artist. But she was one of those who have a hobby. She was a painter. Her paintings, it seems, were very beautiful. So she was not one of those singers who threw herself on their singing, with the ambition of being the greatest. That's probably why she didn't have an international career. It's a pity."

== Discography ==
For the Polydor label, Balguerie recorded excerpts from Iphigénie en Tauride, Alceste, Tannhäuser, The Flying Dutchman, Aïda, Sigurd, Faust and Fidélio.

For Columbia, excerpts from Alceste and Ariane et Barbe Bleue, as well as Le Poème de la maison (1918), a cantata by Georges-Martin Witkowski. On CD, she can be heard in music from Ariane, Alceste and Iphigénie en Tauride in the box set Les introuvables du chant français (EMI 585828-2).
