= Louise (1939 film) =

1939 film

- DVD cover
- Directed by: Abel Gance
- Written by: Gustave Charpentier; Roland Dorgelès; Abel Gance; Steve Passeur
- Starring: Grace Moore
- Cinematography: André Bac; Curt Courant
- Production company: SPPF
- Distributed by: Ideal Film (France); Arthur Mayer & Joseph Burstyn (US)
- Release date: 24 August 1939
- Running time: 83 minutes
- Country: France
- Language: French

Louise is a 1939 French musical film directed by Abel Gance. It was screened out of competition at the 1987 Cannes Film Festival.

Described as "wonderfully atmospheric", the film is based on the opera of the same name by Gustave Charpentier. Charpentier remained on the set throughout the filming and personally coached Grace Moore, who played the title role. Both Georges Thill, who played Julien and André Pernet who played Louise's father, were famous exponents of those roles on the opera stage and had recorded them in 1935. The orchestra was directed by Louis Beydts.

== Cast ==
- Grace Moore as Louise
- Georges Thill as Julien
- André Pernet as Le père de Louise
- Suzanne Desprès as La mère de Louise
- Robert Le Vigan as Gaston
- Ginette Leclerc as Lucienne
- Edmond Beauchamp as Le philosophe (as Beauchamp)
- Jacqueline Gauthier as Alphonsine
- Rivers Cadet
- Pauline Carton as La première
- Roger Blin as Un rapin
