= Un jardin sur l'Oronte =

1922 novel by Maurice Barrès

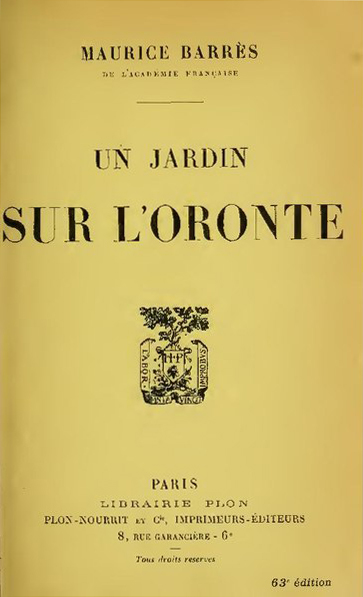
- Author: Maurice Barrès
- Language: French
- Publication date: 1922
- Publication place: France

Un jardin sur l'Oronte (A Garden on the Orontes) is a novel by Maurice Barrès, which was first published in 1922 by Plon-Nourrit. Barrès purportedly transcribed in it a story which an Irish archaeologist had translated to him from a manuscript one evening of June 1914, at a café in Hama by the Orontes River. The tale of love of "a Christian and a Sarrasin" is set in the crusading era of the Middle Ages.

The publication triggered what would be called la querelle de l'Oronte (the Orontes Quarrel): as worded by Jane F. Fulcher, "despite the widely known conservatism of Barrès, the novel created a scandal, particularly in the Catholic press, which perceived its sensuality as an outrage to religious morality." After Barrès' death, the work onto which Barrès "claimed to have projected a Wagnerian conception" was adapted into an opera of the same name with a libretto by Franc-Nohain and music by Alfred Bachelet, which was created, undoubtedly delayed by the scandal, on 7 November 1932.
