= Éveline Plicque-Andréani =

French composer (1929–2018)

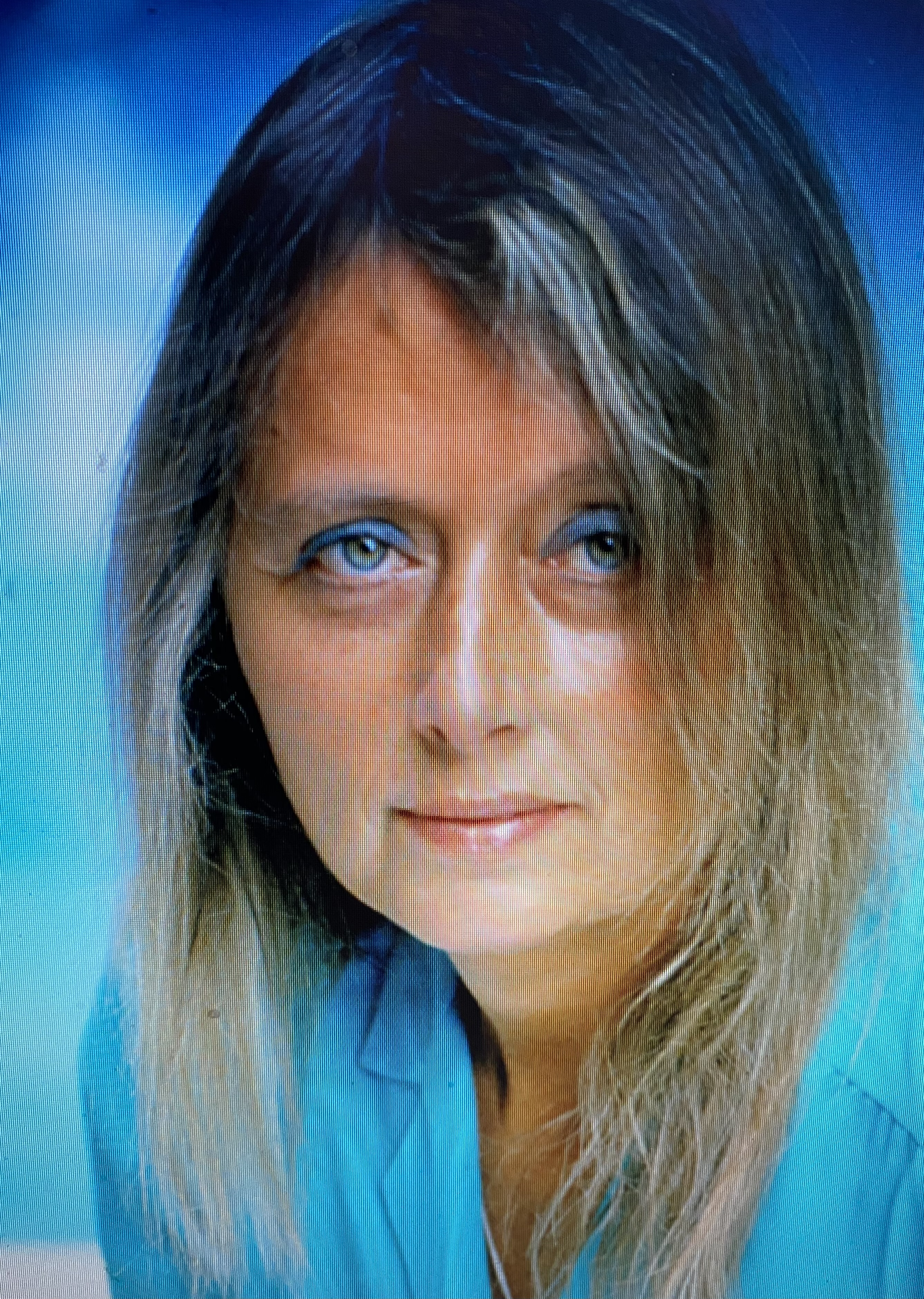
Image of Eveline Plicque Andreani

Éveline Plicque-Andréani, née Boudon (January 25, 1929 – October 16, 2018), was a French composer, musicologist and pedagogue, winner of the Prix de Rome for musical composition in 1950.

== Biography ==
Éveline Plicque-Andréani, born in the 13th arrondissement of Paris, was the daughter of Irène Plicque, a singing teacher, born on May 9, 1901, who on August 18, 1922 married Guy Boudon, a schoolteacher, born on May 5, 1892. She was the natural daughter of Marcel Samuel-Rousseau.

In December 1939, she was admitted to the Paris Conservatoire in music theory classes. Still at the Conservatoire, she joined Marcel Samuel-Rouseau's harmony class from 1945 to 1950, then Noël Gallon's fugue class from 1946 to 1949. Plicque-Andréani was also a student of Nadia Boulanger in the piano accompaniment class. Her awards include: a first medal in solfège in 1942, a second prize in harmony in 1947 and a first prize in fugue in 1949.

She won the Premier Grand Prix de Rome in 1950 with her cantata Bettina, a lyrical scene in one act on a text by Jacques Carol after Alfred de Musset. This award caused a scandal, arising from the small number of composers (among many non-musicians) on the jury, and also because, according to one report, the winner's natural father was on the jury.

This is also resulted in a case, unique in the history of the Prix de Rome, where awards were conferred upon three successive generations within one family.

Plicque-Andréani's grandfather, Samuel Alexandre Rousseau (1853–1904), was the winner of the second Premier Grand Prix de Rome for musical composition in 1878, and professor of harmony at the Paris Conservatoire from 1898 until his death in office in 1904. Marcel Samuel-Rousseau (1882–1955), Samuel Rousseau's son, was also the winner of the second Premier Grand Prix de Rome, in 1905, and professor of harmony at the Paris Conservatoire from 1919 until his retirement in 1952.

From February 1951 to April 1954, Plicque-Andréani was a resident and some-time pensionnaire at the French Academy in Rome at the Villa Medici. During her stay, she composed, among other things, melodies, symphonic suites and an oratorio.

In 1969, Plicque-Andréani participated in the founding of the Music department of the Centre universitaire expérimentale de Vincennes. She subsequently became an assistant professor and then a professor at the same university, teaching harmony and composition and supervising numerous theses. Unlike most of the winners of the Prix de Rome, she was never a professor at the Paris Conservatoire, but had a brilliant academic career. She was successively director of the UFR Arts, Philosophie, Esthétique from 1986 to 1990, then vice-president of the Université Paris-VIII from 1993 to 1997. She was named a knight in the order of the Légion d'honneur in 1997. She retired in 1998.

Plicque-Andréani died on October 16, 2018, in the 17th arrondissement of Paris. She is buried in the Villenoy cemetery (Seine-et-Marne).

== Musical works ==
Her compositions include:

- Bettina, cantata for the Prix de Rome (1950)
- Six mélodies in four parts, envoi de Rome (1952)
- Suite symphonique, in three parts, envoi de Rome (1953)
- Oratorio, envoi de Rome (1954)
- Symphonie concertante, piano reduction (date uncertain)
- Pastelli Romani, suite for orchestra, envoi de Rome (date uncertain)
- Symphonie concertante (1961) (Score: Choudens, recording INA et Radio France)
- Le dormeur du Val, symphonic poem with choir
- Leçons de ténèbres
- Psaume LVI de David (choir, soloists and orchestra)
- Bunraku, for clavecin (1989)
- Nous étions tous des noms d'arbres, settings of texts of Armand Gatti (1990)
- Misa para el hombre nuevo, for choir, orchestra and african percussion instruments (1990)
- Missa defunctorum, Requiem inspired by sacred Corsican chants (1994) (Score and CD Mandala MAN 4912 Harmonia Mundi)
- Ukubekana, on Zulu poems, for 12 voices (1995)
- Brèves d'oiseaux, 7 pieces for children's choir and 7 wind instruments (1995)
- Miroirs d'aube (quartet for clarinets) (2001)
- Le manège, opera for children (2001)
- Chants de terre et de poudre (199?) on popular Zulu poems, for 16 mixed voices

These works have been performed, as the case may be, in Paris and in several cities in the Parisian suburbs, in Corsica (2 tours), in Venice, in Brazil, and in Japan.

== Publications ==
- Éveline Andréani, Antitraité d'harmonie, Paris, Ed. Christian Bourgois, 1979 ISBN 9782264009418
- with Michel Borne, Le Don Juan ou la liaison dangereuse, Paris, l'Harmattan, 1996 ISBN 9782738443007
- with Jean-Paul Olive, "La Tradition comme invention", Revue d'esthétique, no. 4, 1982
- — Antitraité d'harmonie, Paris, Christian Bourgeois, 1979, reprint L'Harmattan, 2020
- — Le Don Juan et les liaisons dangereuses, musique ou littérature, Paris, Montréal, L'Harmattan, 1985 ISBN 978-2-7384-4300-7
- — "Les rapports texte-musique ou les aventures du sens", in Analyse musicale, no. 9, Paris, October 1987.
