= Charles Rousselière =

French opera singer

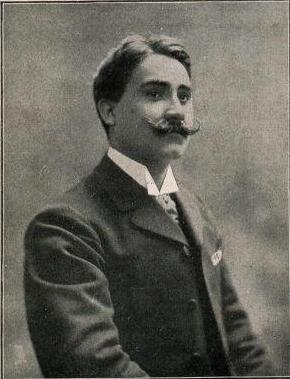
Charles Rousselière in 1904

Charles Rousselière (17 January 1875 – 11 May 1950) was a French operatic tenor who performed primarily at the Paris Opera, the Opéra de Monte-Carlo, and the Opéra-Comique. He sang in the world premieres of several operas, including the title role in Charpentier's Julien and Giorgio in Mascagni's Amica.

Rousselière was born in Saint-Nazaire-d'Aude (village in Languedoc-Roussillon) and originally worked as a blacksmith before studying with Edmond Vergnet, Alfred Giraudet and Léon Achard at the Conservatoire de Paris. He was active in café-concert, and one of the stars of the Petit Ramponneau in Montmartre, run by Théophile Pathé, brother of Charles Pathé, through whom he recorded his first cylindres.

He made his stage debut as Samson in Saint-Saëns's Samson and Delilah at the Paris Opera in 1900. He also appeared at the Metropolitan Opera in New York (where he debuted as Roméo in Roméo et Juliette in 1906) as well as in Berlin, Buenos Aires and Milan. At the 1913 Monte Carlo premiere, and the subsequent Opéra-Comique production in 1919 he sang Ulysse in Pénélope by Fauré, and in 1914 created the role of Lorenzo in Béatrice by Messager in Monte Carlo.

Rousselière sang in Buenos Aires for the first time in 1907 at Teatro de la Ópera in a revival of Verdi´s Don Carlo with Solomiya Krushelnytska, Marie Claessens, Giuseppe De Luca and Adam Didur. He was first Buenos Aires Andreas in Theodora by Xavier Leroux (which he created in Montecarlo the same year), with Claessens and De Luca. In 1908, also at Teatro de la Ópera, he sang Andreas again, Siegmund in Die Walküre and Thésée in the Buenos Aires première of Massenet´s Ariane. In 1910, at the Teatro Colón, he sang Licinio in a revival of Spontini La Vestale with Esther Mazzoleni, Alice Cucini, Francesco Maria Bonini and Giulio Cirino. He was that year the first Loge in Das Rheingold with Didur, De Luca and Lina Pasini Vitale. He also sang Siegmund with Pasini Vitale and Didur, Samson with Cucini and Canio with Ruffo. Returned 1914 and was the first Colón Parsifal (with Rakowska and Serafin conducting) and sang Siegfried and Samson. Rousselière always sang in Italian, except in Siegfried, where he sang in French and the rest of the cast in Italian.

In Madrid, between 1910 and 1920, he sang Loge, Tristan, Siegmund, the two Siegfrieds and Parsifal.

He made a number of recordings between 1903 and 1930.

Rousselière died in Joué-lès-Tours at the age of 75.
