= Léo Staats =

French dancer, choreographer and director

- Born: 1877
- Died: 1952 (aged 74–75)
- Known for: Dance and choreography
- Movement: Ballet

Léo Staats (1877–1952) was a French dancer, choreographer and director.

== Life and career ==
Léo Staats studied ballet with Francis Merante, a dancer at the Paris Opera, and reportedly made his debut in 1887. In 1908 he became Ballet Master at the Paris Opera. From 1926-28 he served as the first choreographer for shows at the Roxy movie palace in New York City. His choreography style was described as Neo-classical.

== Selected works ==
- La nuit de Valpurgis (Faust) (1908, Gounod)
- Namouna (1908, Lalo)
- Javotte (1909, Saint-Saëns)
- Espana (1911, Chabrier)
- Les folies françaises ou Les Dominos (1911, Couperin)
- Les abeilles (1917, Stravinsky)
- Taglioni chez Musette (1920, Auber, Boieldieu, Meyerbeer, Weckerlin)
- Frivolant (1922, Poueigh)
- Cydalise et le Chèvre-pied (1923, Pierné)
- La nuit ensorcelée (1923, Chopin)
- Siang-Sin (1923, Huë)
- Istar (1924, D'Indy)
- Soir de fête (1925, Delibes)
- Orphée (1926, Ducasse)
- La prêtresse de Koridwen (1926, Ladmirault)
- Impressions de music-hall (1926, Pierné)
- L'écran des jeunes filles (1929, Roland-Manuel)
- Le rustre imprudent (1931, Fouret)
- Un jardin sur l'Oronte (1932, Bachelet)
- Roselinde (1933, Hirschmann)
- Le rouet d'Armor (1936, Piriou)
- Iléana (1936, Bertrand)
