= Julien (opera) =

Opera by Gustave Charpentier

Julien, ou La vie du poète
- Opera by Gustave Charpentier
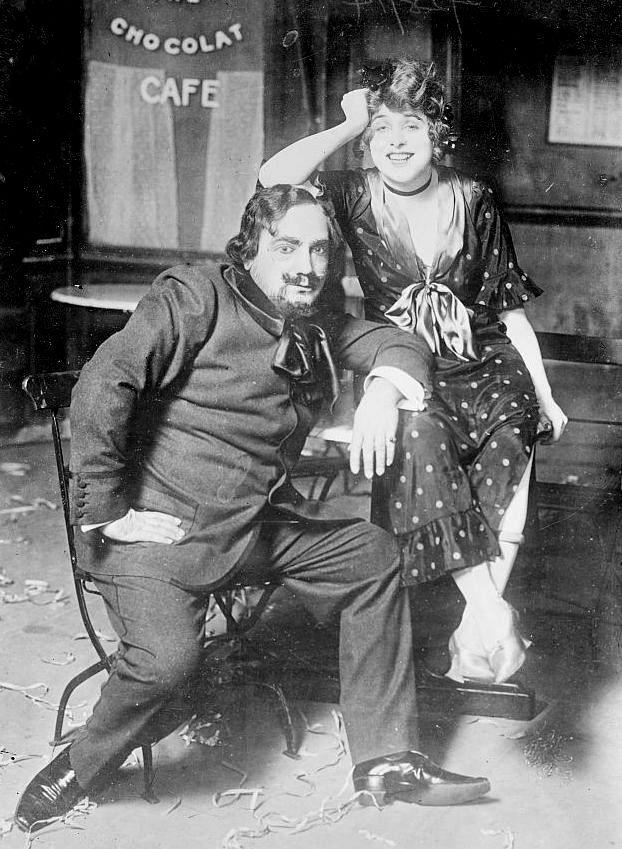
- Enrico Caruso as Julien and Geraldine Farrar as Louise in the 1914 Metropolitan Opera production
- Librettist: Gustave Charpentier
- Language: French
- Premiere: 4 June 1913; Salle Favart, Paris

Julien, ou La vie du poète (Julien, or The Poet's Life) is a poème lyrique, or opera, by composer Gustave Charpentier. The work is devised in a prologue and four acts and uses a French libretto by the composer. Julien is a sequel to Charpentier's Louise (1900) and describes the artistic aspirations of Louise's suitor Julien. The opera premiered in Paris at the Salle Favart on 4 June 1913.

== Background and performance history ==
Like that of Louise, the plot of Julien is semi-autobiographical and requires many characters and chorus roles; in Julien, the female lead portrays four smaller characters in addition to the role of Louise. The opera integrates elements of an earlier composition, La vie du poète, a symphony-drama of 1888–1889. The chorus consists largely of filles du rêve ("girls of the dream"), fairies, and chimeras as well as various men's roles, mainly different kinds of working class men. Charpentier stated that, except in the prologue, "Louise and the various characters who surround Julien are not so much real people as an exteriorized realization of their inner souls".

The opera was not well received at its premiere, although it did gain Gabriel Fauré's admiration for its expressionist qualities. Apart from two productions in 1914, one of which was at the Metropolitan Opera in New York City with Geraldine Farrar and Enrico Caruso in the main roles, it had not been revived until 3 December 2000, when it had its German premiere. That production, at the Theater Dortmund, was directed by John Dew and conducted by Axel Kober.

There are no full-length recordings of the opera. However, Julien's aria "La voix de la nuit", sung by Maurice Dutreix, appears as the final track on the 1935 abridged recording of Louise (re-released in 2003 on Naxos Records).

== Roles ==
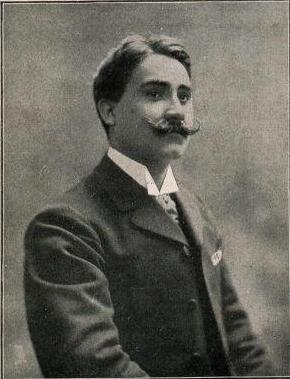
Charles Rousselière, who created the title role

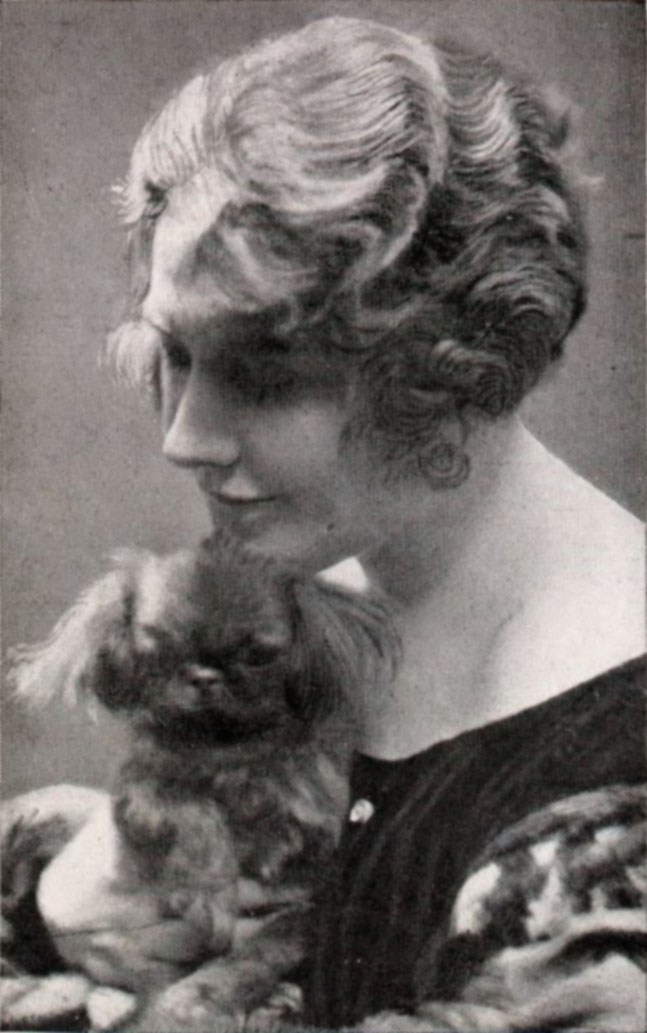
Marguerite Carré, who created the role of Louise

Roles, voice types, premiere cast
Role	Voice type	Premiere cast, 4 June 1913 Conductor: Albert Wolff
Julien	tenor	Charles Rousselière
Louise/Beauty/homeless woman/young girl/old woman	soprano	Marguerite Carré
Hiérophante/peasant/mage	baritone	Raymond Boulogne
Painter	baritone	Andal
Bell ringer	tenor	Maurice Cazeneuve
Acolyte	tenor	Georges-Louis Mesmaecker
Student	bass	Éloi de Roqueblave
A bourgeoise	soprano	Berthe Marietti
A bourgeois	tenor	Daburon
First grisette	mezzo-soprano	Pla
Second grisette	mezzo-soprano	Marguerite Julliot
Voice from the abyss/officer	tenor	Eugène de Creus
First comrade/Another voice from the abyss/stone breaker/	bass	Ernest Dupré
Second comrade/logger/bohemian	tenor	Maurice Capitaine
Third comrade	tenor	Donval
Fourth comrade	tenor	Pasquier
First café waiter	baritone	Corbière
Second café waiter	baritone	Pierre Deloger
First dream ('Chimère')	soprano	Madeleine Ménard
Second dream	soprano	Le Fontenay
Third dream	mezzo-soprano	Germaine Gallot
Fourth dream/country-woman	mezzo-soprano	Germaine Philippot
Fifth dream	mezzo-soprano	Cécile Thévenet
Sixth dream	mezzo-soprano	Alavoine
First girl of the dream	soprano	Marie Tissier
Second girl of the dream	soprano	Marie-Louise Arné
Third girl of the dream	soprano	Germaine Carrière
Fourth girl of the dream	soprano	Jeanne Calas
Fifth girl of the dream	soprano	Marguerite Villette
Sixth girl of the dream	soprano	Marini
Voice offstage	mezzo-soprano	Reynald
Girl	soprano	Pesier

== Synopsis ==
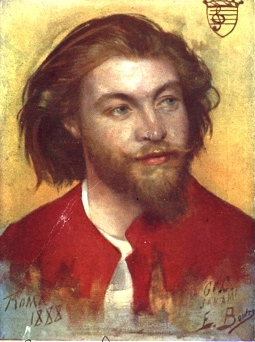
Portrait of Charpentier by Edgar-Henri Boutry, painted in Rome in 1888

Time: 19th century
Place: Initially in Rome; then several others

Prologue

Enthousiasme ("Filled with enthusiasm")

Julien, as a Prix de Rome winner, is studying in Rome at the Villa Medici. This resembles the life of Charpentier as he too was a Prix de Rome winner. However, after this point, the opera moves from the real world into the imagination until the final tableau, set in Montmartre, returns the plot to reality.

Act 1

Au pays du rêve ("In dreamland")

It contains three settings: the Holy Mountain, followed by a setting in the Accursed Valley, and lastly the Temple of Beauty.

Act 2

This takes place in the Slovakian countryside and follows Julien as he experiences doubts in creating his artwork.

Act 3

Impuissance ("Impotence")

This is located in Brittany's wild countryside.

Act 4

Ivresse ("Intoxication")

Set in Montmartre, it closes in the Place Blanche with the sudden appearance of the Temple of Beauty.
