= Axel Kober =

German conductor (born 1970)

Axel Kober (born 10 February 1970) is a German conductor. Since 2009 he has been the music director of the Deutsche Oper am Rhein.

Kober was born in Kronach and studied conducting under Peter Falk and Günther Wich at the Hochschule für Musik Würzburg. His first professional engagement was with the Mecklenburg State Theatre in 1994. From 1998 to 2003 he was the chief conductor of the Theater Dortmund, where he conducted several rarely performed operas, including the German premiere of Charpentier's Julien. Following a 4-year stint at the National Theatre Mannheim (2003–2007) where he served as its chief conductor, and two years as music director of the Leipzig Opera (2007–2009), he was appointed music director of the Deutsche Oper am Rhein. In 2013, the bicentenary of Wagner's birth, Kober made his debut at the Bayreuth Festival conducting Tannhäuser and conducted it again at the 2014 festival.
