= Jacqueline Royer =

French opera singer

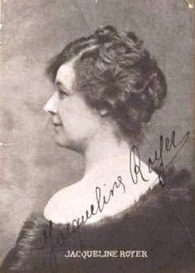
- Postcard portrait of Royer, 1915
- Born: 1884; Guîtres, Nouvelle-Aquitaine, France
- Education: Conservatoire de Paris
- Occupation: Contralto / mezzo-soprano
- Years active: 1904–1924
- Employers: Paris Opera; Royal Opera House; Teatro Colón; Opéra de Monte-Carlo
- Style: Opera

Jacqueline Royer (1884 – 19??) was a French opera singer who sang leading contralto and mezzo-soprano roles at the Paris Opera, London's Royal Opera House, the Teatro Colón in Buenos Aires, and the Opéra de Monte-Carlo. Active on the stage from 1904 until 1924, she created several roles in early 20th century operas, including Carmine in the posthumous premiere of Ponchielli's I Mori di Valenza.

Royer was born in Guîtres, the daughter of a music professor and conductor. She began singing as a child, appearing as the soloist in the performance of a Stabat Mater at the age of ten. She graduated from the Paris Conservatory in 1904 and was immediately engaged by the Paris Opera. She made her debut in November of that year as Léonore in Donizetti's La favorite.

Royer can be heard singing "O toi qui m'abandonne" from Meyerbeer's Le prophète on volume 2 of The Record of Singing.

== Roles created ==
- Marquise de Prie in Spyridon Samaras's Mademoiselle de Belle-Isle, Teatro Politeama Tivoli, Genoa, 9 November 1905
- Carmine in Amilcare Ponchielli's I Mori di Valenza, Théâtre du Casino, Monaco, 17 March 1914
- Musidora in André Messager's Béatrice, Théâtre du Casino, Monaco, 21 March 1914
- Mayabel in Pascual De Rogatis's Huémac, Teatro Colón, Buenos Aires, 22 July 1916
- Djamina (?) in Henry Février's La damnation de Blanchefleur, Théâtre du Casino, Monaco, 13 March 1920
- L'Archangel in Raoul Gunsbourg's Satan, Théâtre du Casino, Monaco, 20 March 1920
