= Un jardin sur l'Oronte (opera) =

Opera with music by Alfred Bachelet

- Lyric drama by Alfred Bachelet
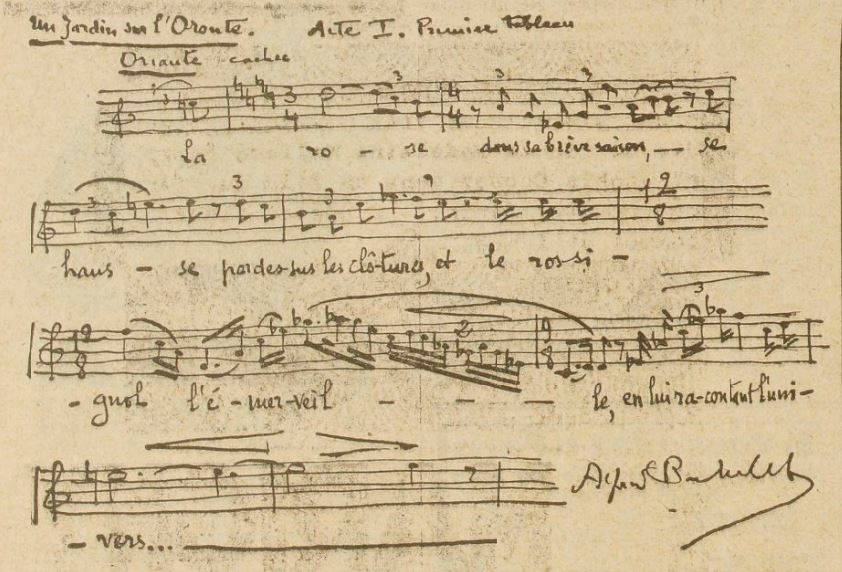
- Librettist: Franc-Nohain
- Language: French
- Based on: Un jardin sur l'Oronte by Maurice Barrès
- Premiere: 7 November 1932; Palais Garnier, Paris

Un jardin sur l'Oronte ("A Garden on the Orontes") is an opera ("lyric drama") in four acts and eight tableaux by Alfred Bachelet to a French libretto adapted by Franc-Nohain from a novel of the same name by Maurice Barrès. The premiere took place on 7 November 1932 at the Palais Garnier in Paris, France.

== Performance history ==
Un jardin sur l'Oronte was premiered at the Palais Garnier in Paris on 7 November 1932 with Suzanne Balguerie in the title role. It was conducted by Philippe Gaubert, with sets and costumes designed by René Piot and executed by Mouveau, Solatgès and Mathieu, and a choreography by Léo Staats.

== Roles ==
Role	Voice type	Premiere cast, 7 November 1932 (Conductor: Philippe Gaubert)
Oriante	soprano	Suzanne Balguerie
Isabelle	mezzo-soprano	Marisa Ferrer
Zobéïde	soprano	Renée Mahé
Badoura	mezzo-soprano	Odette Ricquier
Guillaume	tenor	José de Trévi
L'Émir	baritone	Martial Singher
Le prince d'Antioche	baritone	Arthur Endrèze
L'Évêque	bass	Armand Narçon
L'Écuyer	tenor	José Luccioni
Premier guetteur	bass	Henri Etcheverry
Deuxième guetteur	tenor	Madlen
Premier marchand	tenor	Henri Le Clezio
Deuxième marchand	bass	Louis Morot
Troisième marchand	tenor	Raoul Gilles
Quatrième marchand	baritone	Pierre Nougaro
Premier garde	bass	Léon Ernst
Deuxième garde	baritone	Jules Forest
Guerriers musulmans; chevaliers francs; soldats du prince d'Antioche; femmes musulmanes; femmes chrétiennes; Arabes; enfants; juifs et juives; danseuses musulmanes; danseurs, danseuses et musiciens du prince d'Antioche		Soutzo, Didion, Binois, Simoni, Goubé et autres

== Sources ==
- Wagner, Heinz (1999). Das grosse Handbuch der Oper (in German). F. Noetzel. ISBN 9783795905057.
- Rapetti, Rodolphe, ed. (1991). René Piot, 1866–1934. Rmn – Grand Palais. ISBN 9782711824328.
