= Alfred Giraudet =

French opera singer

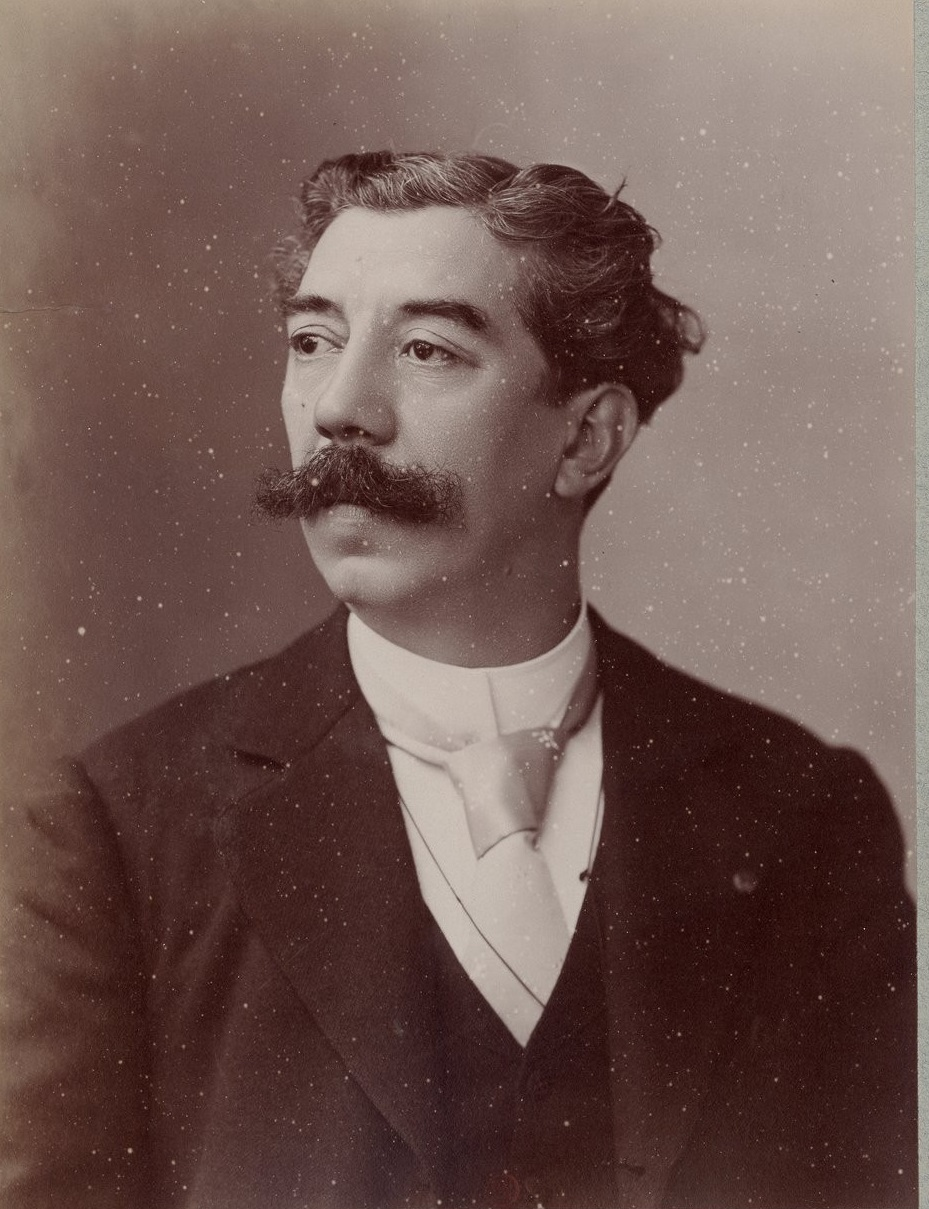
Giraudet c.1900

Alfred-Auguste Giraudet (28 March 1845, Seine-et-Oise – 18 October 1911, New York City) was a French operatic bass, voice teacher, and writer on singing. He was one of the earliest exponents of the role of Méphistophélès in Charles Gounod's Faust; a role he portrayed many times at the Paris Opera where he was a principal artist for over two decades. He was also a regular performer at the Opéra-Comique and taught singing at the Conservatoire de Paris for 15 years. On 10 May 1869 he portrayed the title role in the world premiere of Ernest Boulanger's Don Quichotte at the Théâtre Lyrique. In 1876 he created the role of Vulcan in the world premiere of the revised version of Gounod's Philémon et Baucis. In the Fall of 1908 he joined the voice faculty of the Institute of Musical Art (now the Juilliard School) where he taught for two school years. He died suddenly of pulmonary edema at his home on Claremont Avenue in Manhattan on 18 October 1911, shortly after beginning his third year of teaching in New York.

According to Julia A. Walker, as a singing teacher and writer on singing, Giraudet was greatly influenced by François Delsarte and his theory of voice gymnastics which was an important precursor to the development of modern dance. Giraudet had studied singing with Delsarte at the Conservatoire de Paris and was one of his most distinguished students. His notable pupils included Mariska Aldrich, Lucia Dunham, Charles Rousselière, and Félix Vieuille.
