= Esther Chevalier =

French mezzo-soprano (1853–1936)

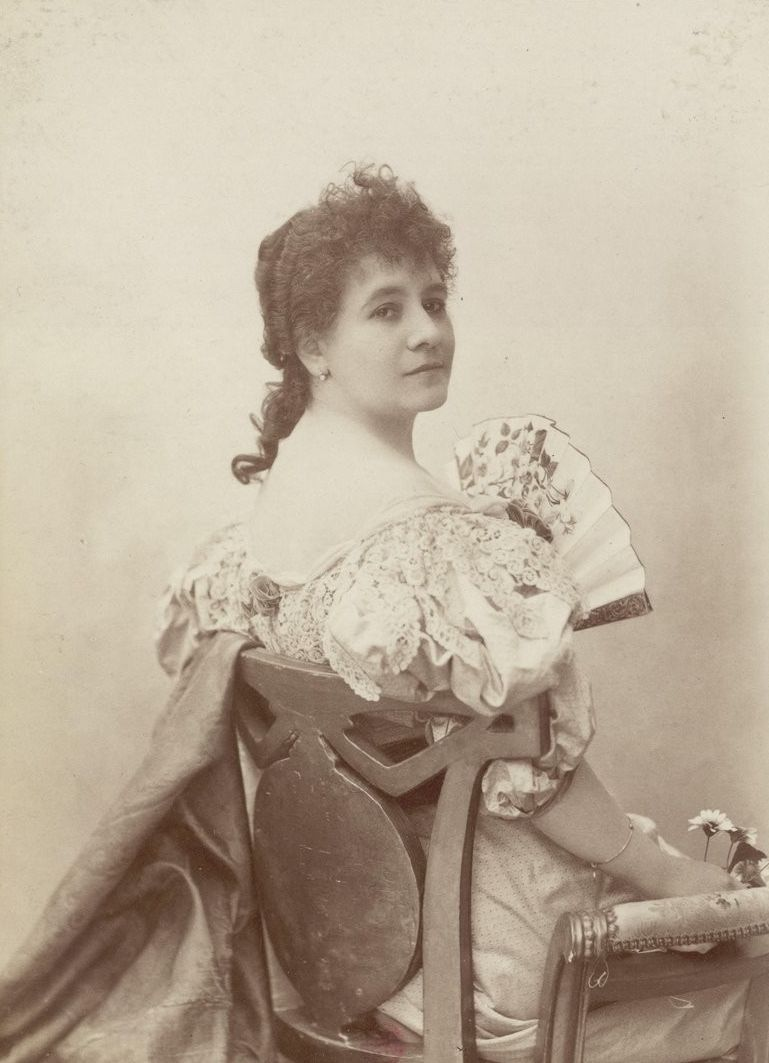
Esther Chevalier

Esther Chevalier (13 September 1853 in Montrouge – 1936) was a French mezzo-soprano, active in Paris almost exclusively at the Opéra-Comique, appearing in several operatic premieres there.

Chevalier was pupil of Saint-Yves Bax, and won first prizes at the Paris Conservatoire in both vocal studies and opéra comique.

She made her debut at the Opéra-Comique on 6 October 1873 as Angèle in Le domino noir and went on to create many roles, such as Mercédès in Carmen, Manette in La chambre bleue, La duègne in La Fille de Tabarin, Javotte in Manon, Herminie in La soeur de Jocrisse, la balayeuse in Louise, and Prudence in Xavière, as well as Meg in the French premiere of Falstaff in 1894. Her other roles at the Salle Favart included Nicklause in Les contes d'Hoffmann, Jenny in La dame blanche, Louise in Le déserteur, Rose Friquet in Les dragons de Villars, the title role in Mignon, Taven in Mireille, une fée in La flute enchantée, Myrza in Lalla-Roukh, Marguérite in Le Pré aux clercs, Laurette in Richard Coeur-de-lion and Rita in Zampa.

Chevalier sang the title role of Carmen at the Opéra-Comique in 1892, having previously sung it in Dieppe.

Malherbe described Chevalier as an intelligent artist, who was invaluable to her company over many years, tackling a broad range of roles from grand ladies to soubrettes, and making a mark even in the smallest roles.
