= Arthur Endrèze =

American opera singer (1893–1975)

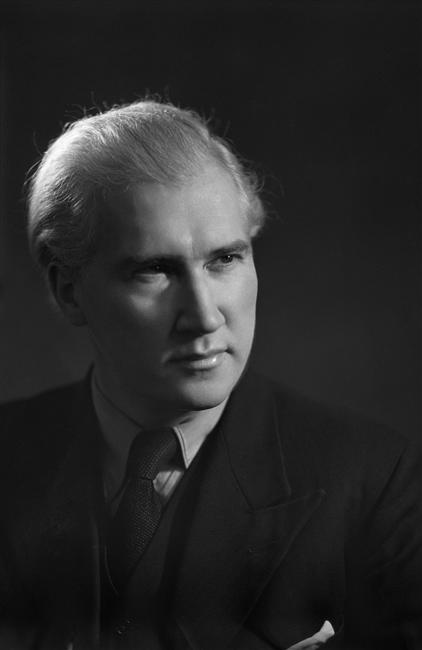
Arthur Endrèze in 1939

Arthur Endrèze (28 November 1893, in Chicago – 15 April 1975, in Chicago) was an American baritone opera singer who enjoyed a popular career in Paris and sang in many premieres. His voice was described as "warm, lyrical" and "well suited to the French repertory".

== Biography ==
Born Arthur E Kraeckmann, he studied agronomy at the University of Illinois, and sang for pleasure in his spare time.

He came to the attention of the conductor Walter Damrosch who advised him to go to France to improve his singing; he did so, enrolling at the American conservatoire at Fontainebleau where he studied under Jean de Reszke.

Endrèze made his debut in 1925 in Nice in the role of Don Giovanni, following this with Hamlet, and went on to sing in seasons at Deauville.

In Paris he made his début on 4 October 1928 in Le roi d'Ys as Karnac, and sang roles in Madama Butterfly (Sharpless), La traviata (Orbel), Tosca (Scarpia), and the revival of Le rêve (Hautecœur) in 1939.

His first appearance at the Opéra on 12 September 1929 was Valentin in Faust. From 1930 until 1946 his roles included the High Priest in Samson et Dalila, Nevers in Les Huguenots, Telramund in Lohengrin, Kurwenal in Tristan und Isolde, the title role in Rigoletto, Iago in Otello, Amonasro in Aida, Athanaël in Thaïs, Hérode in Hérodiade, the title role in Hamlet, Capulet and Mercutio in Roméo et Juliette, Pollux in Castor et Pollux and Jacob in Joseph.

Endrèze created the title role in Guercoeur in 1931, the Conseiller Herzfeld in Maximilien (Darius Milhaud) in 1932, Prince d'Antioche in Un jardin sur l'Oronte in 1932, the Prince de Metternich in L'Aiglon in 1937 (Monte Carlo and Paris), and Comte Mosca in La Chartreuse de Parme in 1939.

He married Jeanne Krieger-Beligne, Chef de chant at the Opéra. Arrested by the Germans in 1940 he managed to make his way back to the United States but returned to France after the war, and after retiring from the stage devoted himself to teaching.

== Recordings ==
He sang Scarpia in the 1932 studio recording of extended excerpts from Tosca in French with forces of the Paris Opéra-Comique conducted by Gustave Cloëz and with Ninon Vallin in the title role, for Odéon. With the same conductor and company he sang Alfio in Cavalleria rusticana. He also recorded individual arias and mélodies. A set described as comprising his 'complete' recordings was issued by Marston Records in 2013.
