= Samuel Rousseau (composer) =

French composer

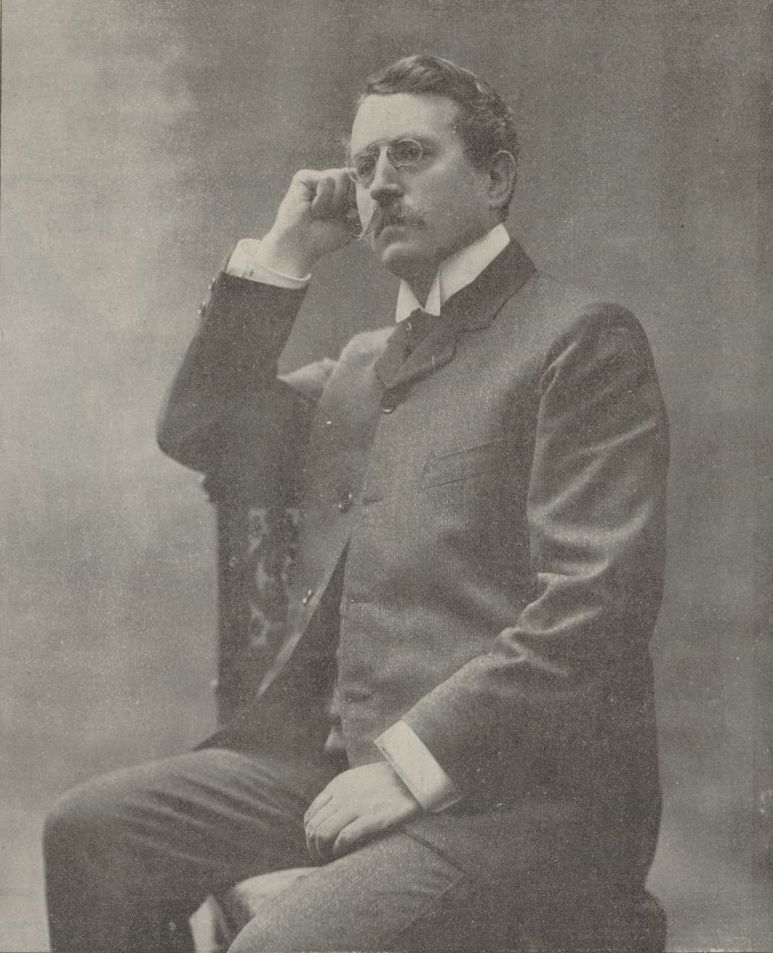
Samuel Rousseau

Samuel-Alexandre Rousseau (French pronunciation: [samɥɛl alɛksɑ̃dʁ ʁuso]; Neuve-Maison, 11 June 1853 - Paris, 1 October 1904) was a French composer.

== Life ==
His father made pump organs and Samuel entered the Paris Conservatoire when he was fourteen years old. He studied with Cesar Franck, and Francois Bazin

He was choirmaster at Sainte-Clotilde, Paris. He composed the comic opera, Leone.

He won the Prix de Rome in 1878, for his cantata 'La Fille de Jephté', and was awarded the Legion of Honour in 1900.

== Family ==
He was Marcel Samuel-Rousseau's father.
