= Alfred Bachelet =

French composer, conductor and teacher (1864–1944)

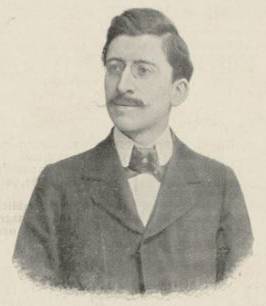
Alfred Bachelet in 1895

Alfred Bachelet (26 February 1864 – 10 February 1944) was a French composer, conductor and teacher.

== Biography ==
Born in Paris, Bachelet studied at the Conservatoire de Paris with Ernest Guiraud and obtained the second Grand Prix de Rome in 1890 with his cantata Cléopâtre after a text by Fernand Beissier. He was conductor of the choir in 1907, then conductor of the Paris Opera. He served as director of the Nancy Conservatory from 1919 until his death in 1944. He was elected to the Académie des Beaux-Arts in 1929.

Bachelet died in Nancy on 10 February 1944.

== Selected works ==
- Chère nuit, lied, 1897
- Scemo, opera, 1914
- Quand la cloche sonnera (libretto by Yoris d'Hansewick and Pierre de Wattyne) opera, 1922
- Un jardin sur l'Oronte (libretto by Franc-Nohain after Maurice Barrès), opera, 1932
- Fantaisie nocturne, ballet
- Sûryâh, symphonic poem
