= Béatrice (opera) =

1914 opera by André Messager

- Opera by André Messager
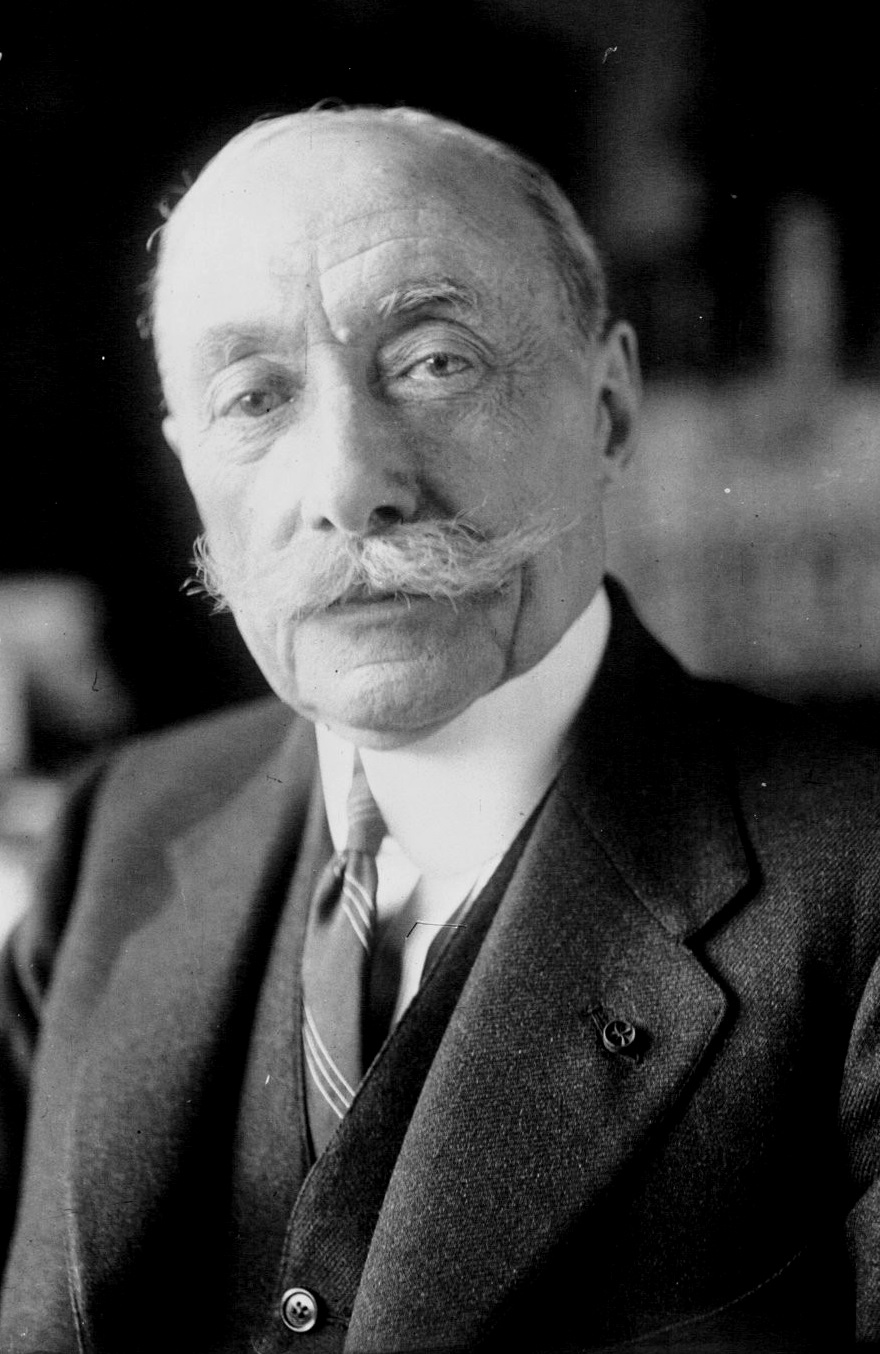
- André Messager in 1921
- Librettist: Gaston Arman de Caillavet; Flers
- Language: French
- Based on: Charles Nodier's La légende de Soeur Béatrix
- Premiere: 21 March 1914; Opéra de Monte-Carlo

Béatrice is a légende lyrique (opera) in four acts of 1914, with music by André Messager and a French libretto by Caillavet and Flers, after the short story La légende de Soeur Béatrix (1837) by Nodier.

== Background ==
Nodier's work was first published in La Revue de Paris in October 1837. The story was chosen by the composer for its variety of dramatic situations; the opera is a serious lyric drama, unprecedented in Messager's output, generally weighted towards operetta. The music critic Pierre Lalo, commenting on the Paris premiere, noted the impact of the second act love duet and considered the fourth act to be most well written.

== Performance history ==
Béatrice was first performed at the Opéra de Monte-Carlo on 21 March 1914, and was subsequently produced in Buenos Aires on 15 July 1916 and Rio de Janeiro on 20 September 1916. The Opéra-Comique in Paris mounted the work on 23 November 1917, with Yvonne Chazel in the title role, and Charles Fontaine, Félix Vieuille and André Baugé among the cast, conducted the composer, with a revival there in 1927 conducted by Albert Wolff with Yvonne Gall in the title role, Félix Vieuille and Roger Bourdin. The opera was broadcast by French radio in 1957, with Jacqueline Brumaire in the title role, Solange Michel, Raphael Romagnonli and Robert Massard, conducted by Gustave Cloëz. A complete performance of the work lasts around two and a half hours.

== Roles ==
Roles, voice types, premiere cast
Role	Voice type	Premiere cast, 21 March 1914 Conductor: Léon Jehin
Béatrice	soprano dramatique	Andrée Vally
La Vierge	soprano	Rainal-Monti
Musidora	mezzo-soprano	Jacqueline Royer
The gypsy woman	mezzo-soprano or contralto	Carton
The mother superior	mezzo-soprano	Alex
Frosine	mezzo-soprano	Eckna
Lélia	soprano	Cécile Malraison
Soeur Odile	soprano	
Soeur Blondine	soprano	
Soeur Monique	soprano	
Lorenzo	tenor	Charles Rousselière
Tibério	baritone	Jean Bourbon
The bishop of Palerme	bass	Robert Marvini
Fabrice	tenor	André Gilly
Fabio	tenor	Delorme
Beppo	baritone	Pierre Clauzure
The gardener	tenor	Charles Delmas
Chorus: Nuns, fishermen; angels

== Synopsis ==
Time: 16th century

=== Act 1 ===
A courtyard of the Abbaye d'Épines fleuries. On the right a grill looking out over the countryside, on the left the entrance to a chapel.

As the curtain rises Béatrice relates to the other nuns the story of how the monastery came to be built. A gardener brings in flowers. Béatrice, 18 years old, claims for herself the charge of looking after the altar to the virgin; her excessive ardour earns her a rebuke.

Alone with Odile and Blandine, the devout Béatrice offers food to a gypsy woman who passes by, and who tells Béatrice's fortune, predicting for her an existence of all the human passions; she is dismissed by Béatrice. The bishop enters, to whom Béatrice tells of her entry to the sisterhood as a result of her prayers for the recovery of Lorenzo, a young man who had returned injured from battle with the Turks.

Béatrice is stunned to hear the voice of Lorenzo approaching; he enters and pleads with for her to leave with him. She refuses but two companions of Lorenzo appear and they abduct Béatrice. When they have gone, the statue of the virgin comes to life, closes the monastery gate, takes up the cloak of Béatrice and enters the monastery.

=== Act 2 ===
A terrace by the sea; on the left a couch, beyond the terrace can be seen a canopy of trees in a garden leading down to the shore. The voice of a fisherman is heard in the distance.

Lorenzo joins Béatrice, who expresses her happiness living with him. Lorenzo tells Béatrice that he has invited the poet Fabrice and savant Tibério, along with Lélia, Musidora, Florise and friends, but Béatrice longs for a simple loving life with Lorenzo rather than jewels he gives her and lively convivial company. Lorenzo's friends enter, and after Béatrice repeats her simple love of Lorenzo, they all toast Venus, and all but Musidora and Lorenzo go down to the shore.

Lorenzo asks Musidora if she still loves Fabrice; they begin to sing about love, and eventually they join in a passionate embrace. Béatrice has entered unseen and witnessed this. When Lorenzo notices her she denounces his betrayal. He tries to make light of it, and then says he must go to Palermo. Béatrice pleads with him to stay. After he has left she calls for the others to return from the shore. Béatrice wildly offers herself to Tibério, and all again toast Venus.

=== Act 3 ===
A poor fishermen's tavern on the Calabrian coast. The gypsy, Beppo, Fabio and others carouse.

Lorenzo appears, with Tibério; they have been travelling for four years. The gypsy asks them what they have brought back from their voyages: exotic and wonderful treasures? They reply: no, emptiness. They both complain about the wine, and Tibério goes off.

Béatrice enters, veiled and wearing miserable attire. She calls herself Ginévra, and says that she does not recognise Lorenzo; she dances at the cabaret and is a great attraction for the men who come there. Lorenzo finally agrees that she cannot be Béatrice, at which she replies: Béatrice is dead, killed by Lorenzo! Lorenzo begs forgiveness for having reduced her to this state by his unfaithfulness, saying he had never forgotten her, but when he sees her lascivious behaviour towards the locals, he flees. Sailors and fishermen have returned, demanding that Ginévra dance for them. She does so – slowly at first, then faster and faster. The men argue over her, then a fight breaks out and Beppo falls dead. Béatrice believes that by her actions she has killed him; she leans fainting against a wall. Gradually, as if in a vision, the virgin of Épines fleuries appears and a holy choir sings.

=== Act 4 ===
Scene : the same as the first act

After a prelude, Béatrice enters through the gate, penitent, broken with exhaustion and her clothes in tatters. She staggers to the altar, devoid of the statue of the virgin, as the nuns sing off-stage. The mother superior asks the virgin – dressed as Béatrice – to lead the prayers for the return of the statue.

The virgin tells Béatrice to rise, and to reject the weakness of man and the frailty of woman. The virgin explains who she is and tells how she took Béatrice's place and undertook her duties in her absence; she forgives her sins while she was away. Removing her cloak she reveals a white robe and a crown of flowers. She then places the cloak across Béatrice's shoulders, and ascends the alcove of her altar. The nuns run on and find Béatrice collapsed on the ground and the statue back in its place. As the statue of the virgin pronounces Béatrice's name, the opera ends with a chorus of praise of nuns and angels.
