= La chartreuse de Parme (opera) =

Four-act opera by Henri Sauguet

La Chartreuse de Parme is a four-act opera in eleven tableaux by Henri Sauguet with a French libretto by Armand Lunel after the 1839 novel of the same name by Stendhal. The composer's third opera, and his first on a serious subject, it was first performed at the Paris Opera in 1939 but has not entered the repertoire.

== Background ==
Armand Lunel was a teacher of philosophy in a lycée in Monaco who also carved out a career as a writer. As well as novels, he also wrote operatic libretti. In 1923 he had written the libretto of Les Malheurs d'Orphée for his friend Darius Milhaud, followed by Esther de Carpentras. Sauguet was introduced to Lunel by Milhaud at the time of the premiere of Les Malheurs d'Orphée in Paris and met him again in 1927 during the preparations for Sauguet's ballet La Chatte for the Ballets Russes.

The composition of La Chartreuse de Parme took place during a long and extensive exchange of letters between composer and librettist. The score was composed during the period 1927 to 1937 during which time Sauguet was developing both as a person and musician.

Lunel was keen to focus on all aspects of Stendhal's novel: historical, political, sentimental, but the final text concentrates on the latter, for which Sauguet's music effected a progressive ascension towards a more pure and rarefied love. The libretto starts when Fabrice, refusing military heroics, has made a clandestine return to his mother and aunt Gina near the Swiss-Italian frontier, thus first seeing Clélia. All chapters of Book I: the arrival of Napoleon and his followers in Lombardy, Fabrice's military exploits and Waterloo; are left out.

The opera is divided into eleven tableaux:

1. The meeting of Clélia and Fabrice on the mountain road from Como to Milan
2. Their meeting at La Scala
3. The celebration at the house of Sanseverina
4. The escape of Fabrice from the inn
5. Prison
6. The tower of the fortress
7. Fabrice's return to Gina
8. Fabrice's flight
9. The garden of Clélia
10. The "sermon aux lumières" in which Fabrice renounces love
11. Fabrice's farewell

Once the vocal score was complete in the autumn of 1937, Hélène de Wendel invited the composer to play through some extracts after a dinner where the guests included Julien Cain of the Bibliothèque nationale and the Institut and Jacques Rouché, general administrator of the Paris Opera. Impressed, Rouché asked Sauguet to present the score to him, which he did singing all parts; before he had finished Rouché accepted to produce the work at the Opéra. Rehearsals were scheduled to start at the very beginning of 1939.

== Performance history ==
Cuts were made after the dress rehearsal and following the premiere on 16 March 1939 (which still lasted five hours with three intervals) performances were given at the Paris Opera up to June that year. After the première several further pages of music were cut. The opera was revised and revived in Grenoble to coincide with the 1968 Winter Olympics with Georges Liccioni (Fabrice), Cora Canne-Meyer (Sanseverina) and Christiane Stutzmann (Clélia), conducted by the composer.

It was produced in Marseille in 2012, conducted by Lawrence Foster with Sébastien Guèze, Marie-Ange Todorovitch and Nathalie Manfrino. Manuel Rosenthal conducted a French radio broadcast of the work at the Théâtre des Champs-Élysées in 1958 with Joseph Peyron, Geneviève Moizan, and Denise Scharley.

La Chartreuse de Parme remains his best work in the genre. While it has been described as a somewhat "featureless" work, it was directly emotional, containing the simple, flowing, melodic lines which embody the French sentiment of that period.

== Roles ==
Role	Voice type	Premiere cast, 16 March 1939 Conductor: Philippe Gaubert
Gina, Duchesse de Sanseverina	soprano	Germaine Lubin
Clélia Conti	soprano	Jacqueline Courtin
Théodolinde, l'aubergiste	mezzo-soprano	Germaine Hamy
Une voix	soprano	Madeleine Lalande
Fabrice del Dongo	tenor	Raoul Jobin
Comte Mosca	baritone	Arthur Endrèze
Général Fabio Conti	bass	Albert Huberty
Ludovic	tenor	Raoul Gourgues
Barbone	bass-baritone	Jules Forest
Le Maréchal des logis	tenor	André Pactat
A voice	baritone	Charles Cambon
Two policemen		Madlen and Petitpas
A gaoler	bass	Léon Ernst
A servant	tenor	Jean Deleu
Two guests		Deshayes and Duval
Chorus

== Synopsis ==
=== Act 1 ===
The first tableau shows the encounter of Fabrice and Clélia near an auberge on the mountain road to Milan. Fabrice, still a teenager, has fled the Grianta castle in a barouche with his mother and aunt, seeking safety in Milan. The carriage is stopped by police looking for a certain Conti travelling without a passport, who then appears, with his young and beautiful daughter Clélia. The Général Conti is escorted to Milan while Fabrice offers a seat in the barouche to Clélia. The second tableau takes place in the box of Gina at La Scala, where she receives Milanese liberals trying with her to find a way of getting Fabrice from arrest by Austrian police, then her lover Mosca, Conti and Clélia and finally Fabrice to whom she explains the plan to help him. By the end of the act, the feelings of Fabrice and Clélia are clear although Gina's towards Fabrice are less so.

=== Act 2 ===
The first tableau, in the palace of the Duchess Sanseverina during a ball shows Fabrice's fears at losing Clélia; he annoys his aunt by talking about his love, and offends Mosca. Clélia's father hopes to find her a better match but a misunderstanding between the young people occurs when she overhears a comment that Fabrice loves the duchess. When Fabrice asks Clélia the reason for her sadness she rushes off. In the next scene at the trattoria of Théodolinde Fabrice is discovered in the arms of the wife of actor Giletti and a duel is declared. Fabrice wins it, but must flee; he writes a farewell letter to Gina.

=== Act 3 ===
Fabrice has been captured and imprisoned in the Farnese Tower in Parma, where the commander is the Général Conti. But Fabrice sees Clélia again, feeding her birds in the prison courtyard – and although she has agreed with her father to marry the Marquis Crescenzi, love is rekindled and he would rather stay in prison near her than escape. Clélia decides to save Fabrice who is in danger of poisoning because of his Bonapartist views. Gina plans to free Fabrice, but he only agrees to go if Clélia meets him. In the final tableau of the act they meet and Clélia swears to help him, but after that will never see him again. The two women give Conti sleeping draft and Fabrice flees with Gina.

=== Act 4 ===
In the first tableau, set in Locarno, Gina watches over Fabrice, who has started to paint. The feelings of the freed Fabrice are explored. Mosca who now realizes the extent of the attachment of Fabrice for Clélia, reports that following the death of the prince, the judgement condemning Fabrice can be lifted. The young man departs for Parme. Mosca once more opens his heart to Gina. Next, Fabrice and Clélia meet at the charterhouse, and in darkness and Fabrice blesses Clélia's marriage to the marquis. A chorus tells of the life of Fabrice from his attachment to the Napoleonic cause to his retreat into orders. In the final scene, Fabrice gives a homily on the rejection of the unhappy sinner, such as he is. He prays for forgiveness.

== Music ==
Sauguet's longest work is traditional in form, but whereas earlier works had been characterized by clear textures, limpid harmonies and relatively straightforward melodies, his music now takes on a more complex harmonic language, suggesting influence of contemporary Russian symphonists.

Darius Milhaud (who attended seven consecutive performances) claimed that he knew nothing of the quality of Chartreuse de Parme since Pelléas et Mélisande or Pénélope. Stravinsky situated the opera "in the line of Bizet, Delibes, Milhaud, Poulenc", while Charles Koechlin summed up his thoughts on the work in three words: "naturel, simplicité, sincerité", and made a comparison with Chabrier. The work was broadcast by French radio.

The opening of the first tableau contains a gendarmes chorus worthy of an opérette. From there the music grows via a bravura D major to a more tender E-flat section where the principal three characters one by one express their feelings, leading to a trio. In the fourth tableau, Sauguet gives Théodolinde's song an ancient air. At times Sauguet's writing echoes both the spontaneity of Schubert and pages of bel canto, where characters immerse themselves in their interior torments. The second tableau ends with a quintet in the style of a grand opera ensemble: the protagonists (Clélia, Gina, Fabrice, Mosca et le Général) sing a common theme then branch into their own character, from the youthful enthusiasm of Fabrice to the melancholy of Mosca. At various points Sauguet exploits an iambic rhythm which serves to express heightened emotions, such as Fabrice writing his farewell letter to Gina, or the final moments of the opera. His orchestration is lucid, supporting the melody.

The overture, depicting the Battle of Waterloo, was withdrawn before the premiere, but Sauguet used it in his war-time Symphonie expiatoire, dedicated to innocent victims of war.
