= Franc-Nohain =

French librettist and poet

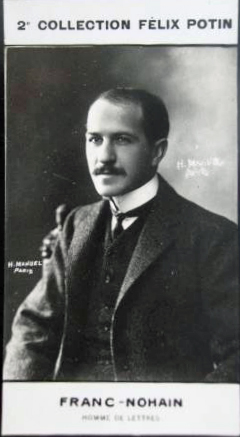
Franc-Nohain

Maurice Étienne Legrand, who published under the pseudonym Franc-Nohain (French pronunciation: [fʁɑ̃.nɔ.ɛ̃]; 25 October 1872 – 18 October 1934), was a French librettist and poet. He is best known for his libretti for Maurice Ravel's opera L'heure espagnole and for numerous operettas by Claude Terrasse.

== Life ==
Maurice Étienne Legrand was born in 1872 in Corbigny; his father was an overseer-agent. He attended the Lycée Janson de Sailly. In the late 1880s he contributed poems to the literary magazine Potache-Revue (potache being slang for 'schoolkid'), along with André Gide, Léon Blum, Pierre Louÿs, Maurice Quillot and others. Later, he published in the journal Le Chat noir. He also founded Le Canard sauvage and became the editor of L'Écho de Paris. He also became a lawyer and deputy prefect.

His literary pseudonym Franc-Nohain was derived from the Nohain river, where he had spent many happy hours as a child.

With Alfred Jarry and Claude Terrasse he co-founded the Théatre des Pantins, which in 1898 was the site of marionette performances of Jarry's Ubu Roi.

He is best remembered now as the librettist for some operettas by Terrasse, and for the opera L'heure espagnole by Maurice Ravel, adapted from his own comedy.

He had two sons: the actor Claude Dauphin, and the songwriter and television producer/director Jean Nohain (aka Jaboune).

He died in Paris in October 1934, aged 61.

== Works ==
=== Libretti ===
- L'Heure espagnole, 1904
- Un jardin sur l'Oronte, 1922, adapted from a novel of the same name by Maurice Barrès
- Le Chapeau chinois, 1931
