= Georges Thill =

French tenor (1897–1984)

- Born: 14 December 1897; Paris, France
- Died: 17 October 1984 (aged 86); Draguignan, France
- Occupation: Opera singer (tenor)
- Years active: 1924 – 1953

Georges Thill (14 December 1897 – 17 October 1984) was a French opera singer. He was often considered to be his country's greatest lyric-dramatic tenor. Born in Paris, his career lasted from 1924 to 1953, peaking during the 1930s.

== Career ==
A pupil of the Neapolitan tenor Fernando De Lucia (1860–1925), Thill made his operatic debut at the Paris Opéra in 1924, and he continued to appear there and at the Opéra-Comique for several decades, undertaking a busy schedule of performances.

In addition, he sang throughout Europe and in South America, receiving the acclaim of audiences and critics at La Scala, Milan, the Rome Opera, the Verona Arena, the Vienna State Opera, the Teatro Colón, Buenos Aires, and the Royal Opera House, Covent Garden, London. He also gave 14 performances, of seven roles, across two seasons (1931–1932), at the Metropolitan Opera in New York City; but he had difficulty fitting in with the unfamiliar American cultural environment, experiencing health difficulties, and he was less well received by the Met's patrons as a consequence.

His voice began to show signs of decline during the 1940s and he retired from the stage in 1953. He died in 1984 in Draguignan.

Chronologically, Thill's operatic repertoire ranged from Gluck to Puccini and embraced works by Gounod, Massenet, Berlioz, Meyerbeer, Wagner, Verdi and Leoncavallo, among others. He also gave song recitals and was a frequent visitor to the recording studio. He cut many 78-rpm discs of French, Italian and German operatic arias and duets, and participated in the recording of an entire performance of Massenet's Werther by French Columbia Records. The finest of his 78s, dating from 1927 to circa 1940, display the gleaming tone of his voice at its superlative best, as well as demonstrating his spotless taste, stylish phrasing and pellucid diction.

Thill also appeared in several film clips and French-language motion pictures, including Louise (1939), based on Gustave Charpentier's opera. It was directed by Abel Gance and featured Grace Moore as Thill's co-star. Privately, Thill, while a dedicated musician, enjoyed a convivial off-stage lifestyle, and he later blamed his propensity to burn the candle at both ends for shortening the span of his vocal prime.

For his operatic career, Thill received the award of the Knight of the Legion of Honor of France in 1934.

== Selected recordings on CD ==
Many of Thill's 78-rpm records are available on CD reissues by EMI and the Preiser label. Naxos Records has produced a two-CD set featuring his singing of six Massenet arias plus his recording of the complete title role of Massenet's Werther, which he made in January 1931. On it, he partners Ninon Vallin and Germaine Féraldy, with the Chorus and Orchestra of the Paris Opera: Élie Cohen, conductor. (Naxos Historical 8.110061-62.)
