= Emma Luart =

Belgian operatic soprano (1892–1968)

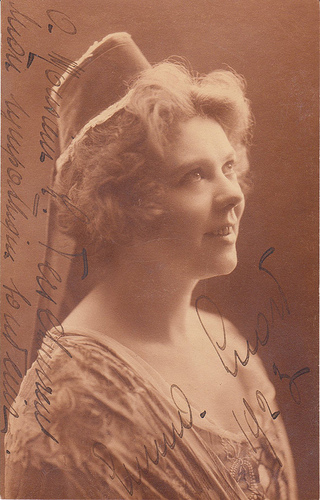
Emma Luart

Emma Luart (14 August 1892, Brussels – 26 August 1968, Brussels) was a Belgian operatic soprano. A graduate of the Brussels Conservatory, she made her official stage début at The Hague in 1914. She was contracted to La Monnaie in Brussels from 1918–1922 where she excelled in lyric soprano roles like Louise, Mélisande, and Manon. She spent the remainder of her career as a member of the Opéra-Comique in Paris. Her career was disrupted by the outbreak of World War II, and she was not heard on the stage again after this point.

== Life ==
Luart was born on 14 August 1892 in Brussels. She was a graduate of the Brussels Conservatory, and she made her official stage début at The Hague in 1914. She was contracted to La Monnaie in Brussels from 1918–1922 where she excelled in lyric soprano roles like Louise, Mélisande, and Manon. She spent the remainder of her career as a member of the Opéra-Comique in Paris. Her Paris debut was in the role of Lakmé. Her career was disrupted by the outbreak of World War II, and she was not heard on the stage again after this point. She taught singing in Brussels in her retirement. In 1997 Vintage Music Company released a recording of Luart singing excerpts from Manon recorded by Odeon electronically between 1928 and 1932.

Her voice has been described as "a characteristically bright 'French' voice ... with a touching expressiveness, especially in the excerpts from Manon.", as possessing "charm, passion, authentic French vocal style", and "almost more French than the French". Comparing her to modern French singer Natalie Dessay, reviewer J. Camner said "To hear the two in juxtaposition is to sense what's missing from French opera today".

Luart died in Brussels on 26 August 1968.
