= Ninon Vallin =

French soprano

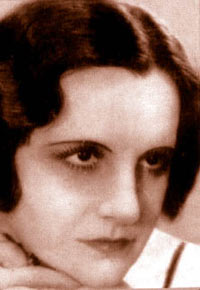
Ninon Vallin

Eugénie "Ninon" Vallin (8 September 1886 – 22 November 1961) was a French lyric soprano who achieved considerable popularity in opera, operetta and classical song recitals during an international career that lasted for more than four decades.

== Career ==
Eugénie Vallin was born at Montalieu-Vercieu, a small town about 30 miles east of Lyon. She studied at the Lyon Conservatoire and later in Paris. At first, she had no intention of performing opera, preparing herself for a career on the concert platform.

In 1911, she was chosen by Claude Debussy to sing the part of the celestial voice in the first performance of his Le martyre de Saint Sébastien. She continued her association with Debussy, giving the première of his Trois poèmes de Stéphane Mallarmé in 1914 at the Salle Gaveau in Paris, accompanied by the composer. She also worked extensively with other contemporary composers, including Albert Roussel, Joaquín Nin-Culmell, and Reynaldo Hahn; the latter two accompanied her in recordings of their own works.

She was first persuaded to sing opera in 1912, appearing in a number of roles at the Opéra-Comique, including Micaëla (in Carmen), Mimì (in La bohème), Clara in Les cadeaux de Noël, and the title role in Louise. She went on to make her début at the Teatro Colón, as Marguerite (in Faust) in 1916, returning there regularly over the next 20 years. She made other débuts at Milan's La Scala (in 1916), Rome (1917), the Paris Opéra, as Thaïs, (1920) and San Francisco opera (1934).

The range of roles which she undertook was unusually varied in their vocal requirements: Manon, Charlotte (in Werther), Juliette (in Roméo et Juliette), Marguerite (in Faust), Mignon, Zerlina (in Don Giovanni) and Mélisande. She also sang the trio of heroines in The Tales of Hoffmann.

Vallin had a great affection for French operetta, and performed works by Lecocq, Massé, and Chabrier; she even ventured into music hall during the 1930s, singing at the Alhambra in Paris. Such was her popularity in her native country that she also appeared in a 1937 film, Madelon's Daughter.

Vallin worked with most of the leading French singers of her era, including the renowned tenor Georges Thill, whom she disliked. Her voice was that of a good-sized lyric soprano, well balanced but strongest in its middle and lower registers; but, at her peak, she was also capable of singing high coloratura, as recordings of arias by Bellini and Donizetti illustrate. Her tone was cool and clear, with exemplary enunciation. Louise, Charlotte and Manon became her signature roles. Her performances were described by the critic André Tubeuf as the "epitome of good singing but also of good taste". Sound technique supported both her versatility and the durability of her career; as late as 1946, when she was 60, she sang the Countess (in Le nozze di Figaro) and she continued singing and recording into the 1950s. Between 1953 and 1959, she was a guest professor at the Conservatory in Montevideo.

== Death ==
She died in 1961, aged 75, at La Sauvagère, her estate at Millery, near Lyon.

== Recordings ==
Ninon Vallin left a considerable output of 78-rpm recordings, dating from 1913 until the early 1950s, which can be heard on CD reissues. Many of them consist of operatic arias but there are also notable discs of French mélodies by Fauré, Chausson and Hahn. Among the complete or semi-complete opera recordings in which she featured were:

- Louise (abridged); conducted by Eugène Bigot in 1935;
- Werther; conducted by Elie Cohen in 1931, with Georges Thill as the tenor lead, in what is still considered to be the finest, most idiomatic recording of this work; and
- Les noces de Jeannette, conducted by Laurent Halet in 1922.

== Legacy ==
A French school in Valence is named after her. As well as a facility for children with disabilities in Grenoble.

== Bibliography ==
- Barnes, H.M. [1953]. "Ninon Vallin", Record collector, viii, 53; with a discography.
- Celletti, R. [1964]. "Ninon Vallin", in Le grandi voci, (Roma: Istituto per la collaborazione culturale); with an opera discography by R. Vegeto.
- Fragny, R. de. [1963]. Ninon Vallin, princesse du chant, (Lyon: Éd. et Impr. du Sud-Est).
- Pinchard, M. [1962]. "Hommage à Ninon Vallin", Musica, 95: 4.
- Steane, John [1974]. The Grand Tradition, (Duckworth, London).
