= Charles Friant =

French opera singer (1890–1947)

Auguste Charles Paul Friant (12 January 1890 – 22 April 1947) was a French tenor.

== Early life ==
Friant was born in the Montmartre district of Paris. His father was a principal ballet dancer, and his grandfather a professor of ballet at the Paris Opéra. While a boy, Charles Friant sang in the opera chorus, and appeared in the premiere of Vincent d'Indy's opera L'Etranger in 1902. Friant attended ballet school in Paris from 1901 to 1906. He met his wife to be, Mademoiselle Mougot, at the ballet school where she taught an acting course in which Friant enrolled. He then trained as an actor with Sarah Bernhardt, joining her company touring Europe from 1908 to 1909. This included performing opposite Bernhardt in Edmond Rostand's L'Aiglon. In 1910, it was discovered he had a tenor voice, and he went to the Conservatoire de Paris to study singing with noted baritone Léon Melchissédec. On graduating in 1914, he was awarded a first prize in singing as a pupil of Alphonse Leduc Hettich and a first prize in opéra-comique as a student of Melchisédec.

== Career ==
His operatic debut, postponed by illness and World War I was as Spakos in the first French performance of Jules Massenet's Cléopâtre at the Théâtre Lyrique du Vaudeville. One notice stated, "here is a young tenor of whom it is possible to expect much, especially if he improves his enunciation". Between 1918 and 1919, he sang at Grenoble's Grand Théâtre.

Friant became a principal tenor of the Opéra comique from 1920 to 1939. His debut at that company, at the Salle Favart, was on 4 February 1920 in the title role of Massenet's opera Werther. Werther became one of his signature roles. He was immediately acclaimed as an extraordinary singer. Friant had a wide repertory, including the title role in Henri Rabaud's Marouf, Le Chevalier des Grieux in Manon, Gérald in Lakmé, Jean in Le jongleur de Notre Dame (another signature role), Canio in Pagliacci, Cavaradossi in Tosca, and Don José in Carmen.

With his acting ability, he was often chosen to create roles in new operas. He sang in the premieres of Le roi Candaule by Alfred Bruneau (as Gygès); and Le Bon Roi Dagobert (as Dagobert), La Hulla (as Narsès), Deux sous de fleurs by Ralph Benatzky, Mandrin by Joseph Szulc (as Antoine), and the title role in Tarass-Boulba by Marcel Louis Auguste Samuel-Rousseau. Other works of his day he was chosen for included le Prince Charmant in Louis Aubert's La Forêt Bleue and Raphael in Charles Levadé's La Peau de chagrin.

Besides Grenoble and Paris Friant also sang at the casino in Biarritz, the Théâtre Royal de La Monnaie in Brussels, the Opéra de Marseille, and the Nice Opera. Friant appeared at the Algiers Opera (now the Théâtre National Algérien) in the 1926/1927 season in Manon, Tosca, Werther, and Le jongleur de Notre Dame; and in the 1931/32 season in La Peau de chagrin.

His final performance was at the Opéra de Monte-Carlo on 2 February 1946 in Carmen in the supporting role of Le Dancaïre. He never sang at the Paris Opéra. He died after a long illness at age 57 in Paris.

He has been described as a lyric tenor of surpassing sensitivity. Friant was known for his quick vibrato, articulation and exquisite phrasing. He made each of the characters he portrayed unforgettable. His use of dynamics reached deeply, touching his listeners with more than just the beauty of his voice. Due to his training Friant possessed not only an expressive voice but also a ballet dancer's movement and an actor's sense of gesture. In a review of some of his recordings, William Ashbrook wrote: "For those who think singing is all beautifully rounded tones, Friant will never make the top twenty, but for listeners who respond to deeply felt dramatic expression he will always be regarded as a cherishable artist". His was a style of classic French singing that died out after World War II.

Friant made acoustical recordings for Pathé and the Compagnie Française du Gramophone and electrical recordings for Odéon. He was featured in EMI's The Record of Singing volume 2 (1914–1925) "The French Tradition in Decline".
