= Louise (opera) =

Opera by Gustave Charpentier

- Opera by Gustave Charpentier
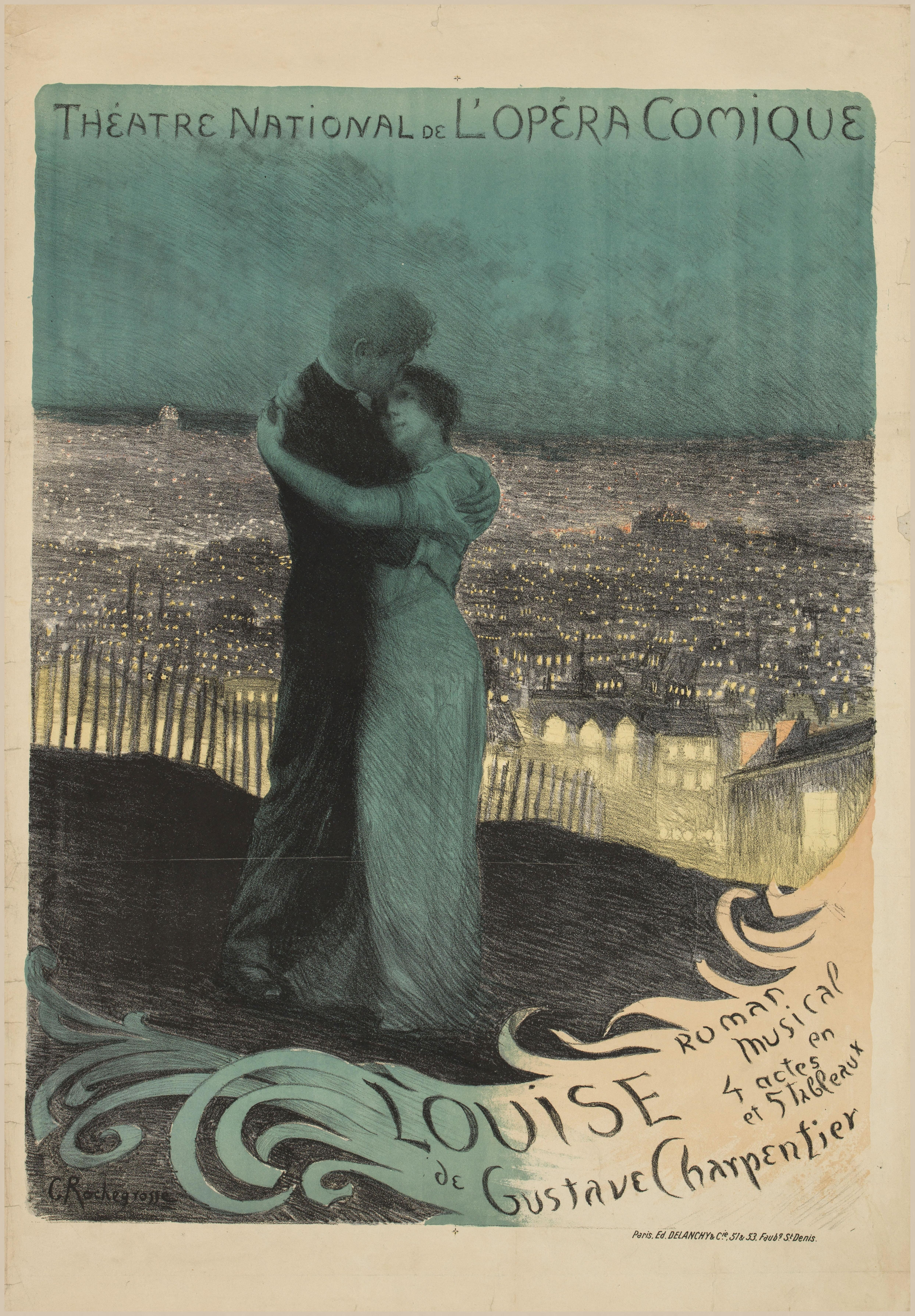
- Poster by Rochegrosse for the opera's premiere
- Librettist: Gustave Charpentier
- Language: French
- Premiere: 2 February 1900; Opéra-Comique, Paris

Louise is a "musical novel", or "roman musical", in four acts and five scenes by Gustave Charpentier. It can be considered an opera. The composer himself penned the French libretto with contributions from Saint-Pol-Roux, a symbolist poet and the inspiration of the surrealists. It is an atmospheric story of working-class life in Paris, with the city itself invoked along the way: young Louise, a seamstress living with her parents, loves Julien, an artist; she desires freedom, associated in her mind with him and the city. (Charpentier would later write a sequel, the opera Julien, describing the artist's aspirations.) Musically the work is considered an example of verismo, and marks the beginning of naturalism in French opera.

== Performance history ==
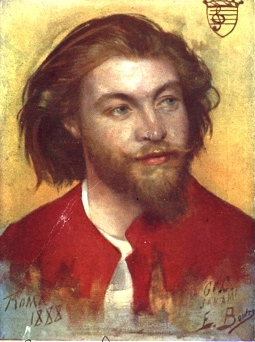
Portrait of Charpentier by Edgar-Henri Boutry, 1888

Louise was premiered on 2 February 1900 at the Salle Favart by the Opéra-Comique conducted by André Messager in a production by Albert Carré. It was successful, reaching its 100th performance just over a year later; the 500th performance at the Opéra-Comique took place on 17 January 1921, and by the early 1950s it had reached over 950 performances. The opera helped launch the career of the soprano Mary Garden, who sang Louise in Act 3 at the eighth performance. On 30 April 1900 the Opéra-Comique director Albert Carré gave away 400 seats to Paris dressmakers.

The success in Paris led to productions in Algiers, Brussels, Budapest and Milan in 1901 and in Berlin, Prague, Vienna, Geneva and Stockholm in 1902, followed by other cities. First seen in New York City at the Manhattan Opera House in 1908, Louise was premiered by the Metropolitan Opera on January 15, 1921 (with Geraldine Farrar in the title role and Flora Perini as Gertrude). It was revived at the Met in a new production in 1930, broadcast twice (in 1939 and 1948). After 1949 it disappeared from the Met repertoire.

The revival of Louise at the Opéra-Comique on 28 February 1950, with scenery after maquettes by Utrillo and Géori Boué in the title role, celebrated the 50th anniversary of its creation and the 90th birthday of its composer. Although it was hoped that Charpentier might conduct the performance, in the end André Cluytens did so, but with the composer conducting the 'Chant de l’apothéose' after the 3rd act.

Louise was staged by English National Opera in 1981, and more recently, at the Paris Opera (2008), Duisburg (2008), the Spoleto Festival (2009), the Opéra National du Rhin in Strasbourg and Mulhouse (2009), and Düsseldorf (2010). There are several recordings, and the opera is still performed today. The third-act aria 'Depuis le jour' is a popular concert piece that has often been recorded.

== Roles ==
Role	Voice type	Premiere Cast, 2 February 1900 (Conductor: André Messager)
Julien	tenor	Adolphe Maréchal
Louise	soprano	Marthe Rioton
Mother	mezzo-soprano	Blanche Deschamps-Jéhin
Father	baritone	Lucien Fugère
The noctambulist	tenor	Ernest Carbonne
Irma	soprano	Jeanne-Louise Tiphaine
Camille	soprano	Marie de l’Isle
Gertrude	soprano	Delorne
Elise	soprano	de Craponne
Gavroche	soprano	de Craponne
Première	soprano	del Bernardi
Apprentie	soprano	Vilma
Chiffonière	soprano	Micaely
Blanche	soprano	Sirbain
Suzanne	mezzo-soprano	Stéphane
Laitière	soprano	Claire Perret
Madeleine	soprano	de Rouget
Balayeuse	mezzo-soprano	Esther Chevalier
Plieuse	soprano	Argens
Glaneuse	soprano	Pauline Vaillant
Marguerite	soprano	Fouqué
Chiffonnier	bass	Félix Vieuille
Bricoleur	bass	Léon Rothier
1st Philosophe	tenor	Danges
2nd Philosophe	baritone	Viaud
Chansonnier	baritone	Dufour
Sculpteur	bass	Gustave Huberdeau
Étudiant	tenor	Leo Devaux
Poète	tenor	Rappaport
Peintre	baritone	Louis Viannenc
Bohème	bass	Hippolyte Belhomme
Chant’habits	tenor	Clasens
1st Guard	baritone	Étienne Troy
2nd Guard	bass	Michaud
Apprenti	child soprano	petit Georges
Danseuse	–	Éden Santori
Workers and residents of Paris

== Synopsis ==
=== Act 1 ===
The Parisian home of Louise's parents

Louise has fallen in love with her neighbor, Julien. At the opening of the opera, they recall how they met. Louise's mother interrupts them and vocally expresses her disapproval of Julien. The exhausted father comes home from work and his wife and daughter implore him to quit the taxing job. However, he feels that it is his responsibility to provide for his family. At supper, he reads a letter that Julien left in which he proposed marriage to Louise. He is indifferent, but the mother is livid and, when Louise stands up for Julien, she slaps Louise across the face. The peaceful father asks his daughter to sit with him and read the paper. As she reads about springtime in Paris, she breaks down and cries.

=== Act 2 ===
Scene 1: A street in Paris

It begins with a prelude that suggests dawn in Paris. The curtain rises to a bustling scene where people go about their daily routines and comment about life in general. The Noctambulist enters and calls himself the spirit of the Pleasure of Paris, and then leaves with the daughter of a ragman. Julien appears with a group of fellow bohemians to show them where Louise works. He tells them that if her parents do not consent to marriage, he will carry the girl off. Julien and his companions go off and he sings that the medley of sounds around him is the voice of Paris itself. Louise and her Mother arrive at the dressmaking store where Louise works (her mother brings her to work everyday). When the mother leaves, Julien returns. Louise tells him she loves him, but she loves her parents too much to leave them. He tries to persuade her to run off with him and she finally agrees to do so soon.

Scene 2: Inside Louise's place of work

Louise is being teased by the other seamstresses for being in love. A band is heard outside and Julien sings a serenade. The girls admire him for his looks and voice. Louise quietly slips away – to run off with Julien.

=== Act 3 ===
A cottage overlooking Paris

The act opens with the opera's most well known aria, "Depuis le jour"; the lovers have moved into a cottage overlooking Paris and in the aria she sings of her happiness with her new existence and with her lover. A long love duet ensues in which they sing of their love for each other and Paris. Many Bohemians enter and crown Louise Queen of Montmartre. The Noctambulist presides as the King of the Fools. Louise's mother appears and the festivities end. She tells Louise of her father's illness and that her father creeps into Louise's room in the middle of the night, even though they agreed to regard her as dead. Even Julien is moved, and he lets Louise leave on the promise she will return whenever she wishes.

=== Act 4 ===
The Parisian home of Louise's parents

The father has regained his health and spirits. He is working again, but has come to accept poverty in a philosophical way. His recovery can be attributed to the return of Louise, whom he takes into his arms and sings a lullaby. She is not comforted and longs to be with Julien again. A merry waltz is heard outside and Louise takes it up, singing madly of love and freedom. Her parents are shocked and her father becomes increasingly angry. He shouts at Louise and demands that she leave; if that is what she wants, let her go and dance and laugh! He begins to attack her, but the mother stands in the way. Louise runs from the room to go back to Julien. Only then does the father realise what he did. "Louise, Louise!" he calls. She is gone and in despair he shakes his fist at the city that stole his daughter, "Paris!" he moans and the opera closes.

== Film ==
An abridged version of Louise was made into a film in 1939, under the supervision of the composer. This included spoken dialogue. The director was Abel Gance. Louise was played by Grace Moore, Julien by Georges Thill, and the father by André Pernet.

== Recordings ==
- 1935: Conductor: Eugène Bigot; Principal singers: Ninon Vallin (Louise), André Pernet (Father), Christiane Gaudel (Irma), Georges Thill (Julien), Aimée Lecouvreur (Mother). French Columbia; mono; abridged by the composer; recent issues: Nimbus 1528320, Naxos 8.110225
- 1956: Conductor: Jean Fournet; Principal singers: Berthe Monmart (Louise), Louis Musy (Father), André Laroze (Julien), Solange Michel (Mother); Choeurs et Orchestre du Théâtre National de l'Opéra-Comique. Mono recording; complete score; original issue: Philips L3L0006 (recent issues: 442 082-2)
- 1976: Conductor: Georges Prêtre; Principal singers: Ileana Cotrubas (Louise), Gabriel Bacquier (Father), Plácido Domingo (Julien), Jane Berbié (Mother), Michel Sénéchal (The Noctambulist); Ambrosian Opera Chorus, New Philharmonia Orchestra. LP: CBS 79302 or Columbia Masterworks M3 34207; CD (1990): Sony S3K 46429 (OCLC 610468156).
- 1977: Conductor: Julius Rudel; Principal singers: Beverly Sills (Louise), José Van Dam (Father), Nicolai Gedda (Julien), Mignon Dunn (Mother), Martyn Hill (The Noctambulist); Children's Choir of the Resurrection, Chorus and Orchestra of the French National Opera. LP: Angel (SQ) 5CLX3846.
- 1983: Conductor: Sylvain Cambreling; Principal singers: Felicity Lott (Louise), Ernest Blanc (Father), Jerome Pruett (Julien), Rita Gorr (Mother); Chœurs et Orchestre Symphonique de l'Opéra de Belgique. complete score; original issue: Erato NUM 750843
