= Gustave Charpentier =

French composer (1860–1956)

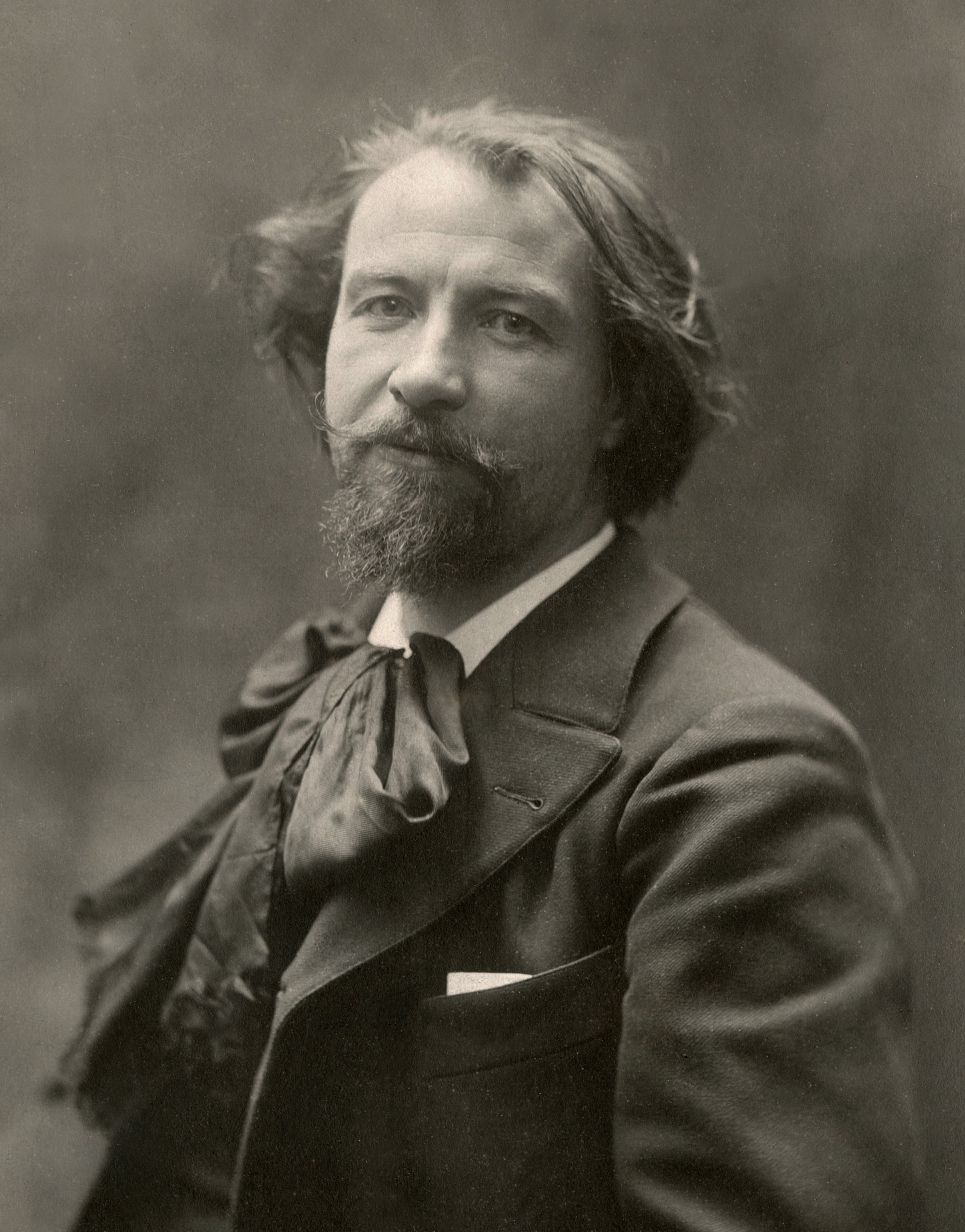
Gustave Charpentier

Gustave Charpentier (French: [ɡystav ʃaʁpɑ̃tje]; 25 June 1860 – 18 February 1956) was a French composer, best known for his opera Louise.

== Life and career ==
Charpentier was born in Dieuze, Moselle, the son of a baker, and with the assistance of a rich benefactor he studied violin at the conservatoire in Lille before entering the Paris Conservatoire in 1881. There he took lessons in composition under Jules Massenet (from 1885) and had a reputation of wanting to shock his professors. In 1887 he won the Prix de Rome for his cantata Didon. During the time in Rome that the prize gave him, he wrote the orchestral suite Impressions d'Italie and began work on the libretto and music for what would become his best-known work, the opera Louise.

Charpentier returned to Paris, settling in Montmartre, and continued to compose, including songs on texts by Charles Baudelaire and Voltaire. He eventually completed Louise, and it was accepted for production by the Opéra-Comique. A realistic portrait of Parisian working-class life, it is sometimes considered a French example of verismo opera.

The premiere of Louise on 2 February 1900 under the baton of André Messager was an immediate success. Soon this work was being performed all over Europe and America, and it brought Charpentier much acclaim. It also launched the career of the Scottish soprano Mary Garden, who took over the title role during an early performance. In late 1935 the composer supervised the abridged score used in a studio recording of around 70 minutes of the opera, conducted by Eugène Bigot. A film adaptation of the work followed in 1939 with Grace Moore in the title role. At the revival of Louise at the Opéra-Comique on 28 February 1950, celebrating the 50th anniversary of its creation and the 90th birthday of its composer, it was hoped that Charpentier himself might conduct the performance, but André Cluytens did so, with the composer conducting the "Chant de l'apothéose" after the third act.

Louise is still occasionally performed today, with the soprano aria "Depuis le jour" a popular recital piece.

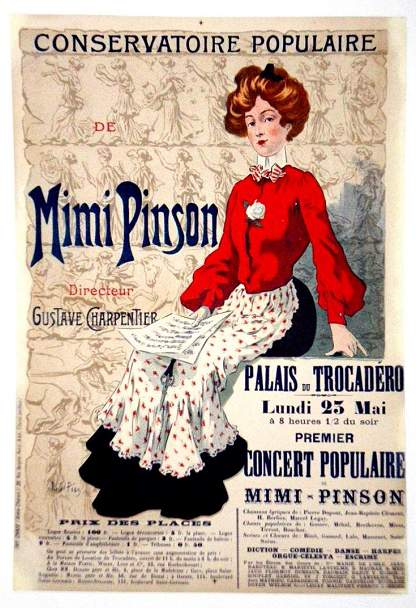
Poster advertising concert by the Conservatoire Populaire de Mimi Pinson at the former Palais du Trocadéro

In 1902, Charpentier founded the Conservatoire Populaire Mimi Pinson, intended to provide a free artistic education to Paris's working girls. However, he became unproductive as a composer. He worked on a sequel to Louise, Julien, ou la vie du poète, but it was quickly forgotten after its tepidly received 1913 premiere. Thereafter, Charpentier wrote very little.

He was, nevertheless, no recluse. During World War I, he started the Œuvre de Mimi Pinson and Cocarde de Mimi Pinson to aid wounded soldiers. He was awarded the Légion d'honneur in 1900, became a Commandeur in 1930, and a Grand Officier in 1950. In 1934, he conducted a recording of his Impressions d'Italie with a Paris symphony orchestra. He died, aged 95, in Paris.

Charpentier's brother Victor (also born in Dieuze, on 23 July 1867) was a cellist in the orchestra of the Paris Opera and later a conductor of popular symphony concerts in Paris. In 1931 Marc Delmas published a biography of Charpentier entitled Gustave Charpentier et le Lyrisme Francais.

== Compositions ==
- Didon, Scène dramatique – 1887
- Impressions d'Italie – 1892
- La vie du poète – symphonie-drame – 1892
- Sérénade à Watteau (words by Verlaine) – 1896
- La couronnement de la muse – spectacle – 1897
- Louise – 1900
- Munich – symphonic poem – 1911
- Julien, ou La vie du poète – 1913
- L'amour au faubourg – 1913 (unperformed)
- Orphée – 1931 (unfinished)
- Songs
