= Place de la Monnaie =

Square in Brussels, Belgium

Place de la Monnaie (French); Muntplein (Dutch)
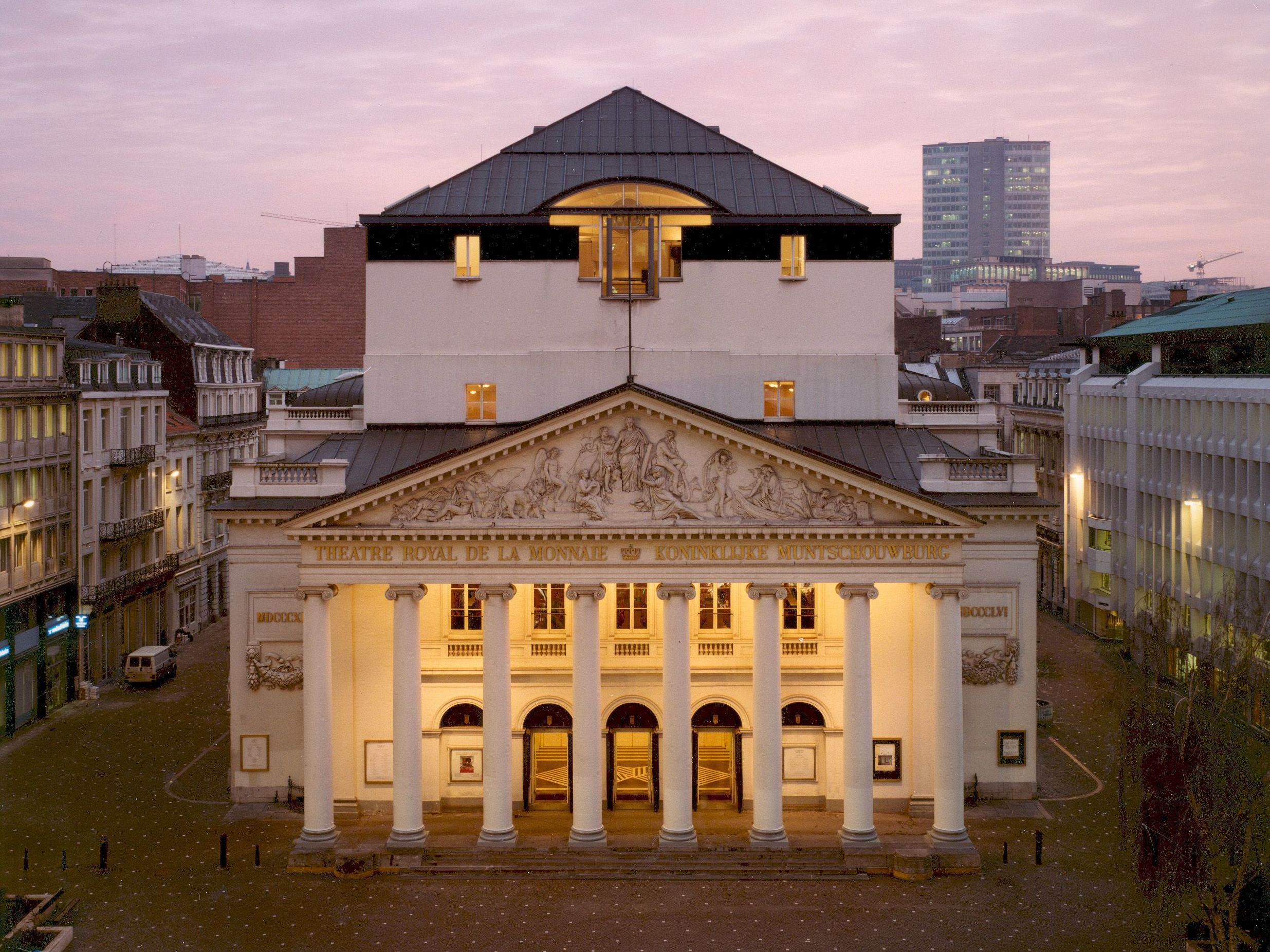
- The Royal Theatre of La Monnaie on the Place de la Monnaie/Muntplein in Brussels

- Location within Brussels Location within Belgium
- Type: Square
- Location: City of Brussels, Brussels-Capital Region, Belgium
- Quarter: Marais–Jacqmain Quarter
- Postal code: 1000
- Nearest metro station: 1 5 De Brouckère
- Coordinates: 50°50′59″N 04°21′12″E

The Place de la Monnaie (French, pronounced [plas də la mɔ.nɛ]) or Muntplein (Dutch, pronounced [ˈmʏntˌplɛin]), meaning "Mint Square", is a major square in central Brussels, Belgium. The Royal Theatre of La Monnaie, home to the National Opera of Belgium, is located on this square. It is served by the metro and premetro (underground tram) station De Brouckère on lines 1, 4, 5 and 10.

== History ==
=== Early history ===
The Place de la Monnaie takes its name from an old coinage workshop or mint, erected inside the former Hôtel Ostrevant, which, from the 14th to the 16th centuries, occupied most of the current square. The name of this site—La Monnaie (originally spelled La Monnoye) in French or De Munt in Dutch (both meaning "The Mint")—remained attached to the square for the centuries to come.

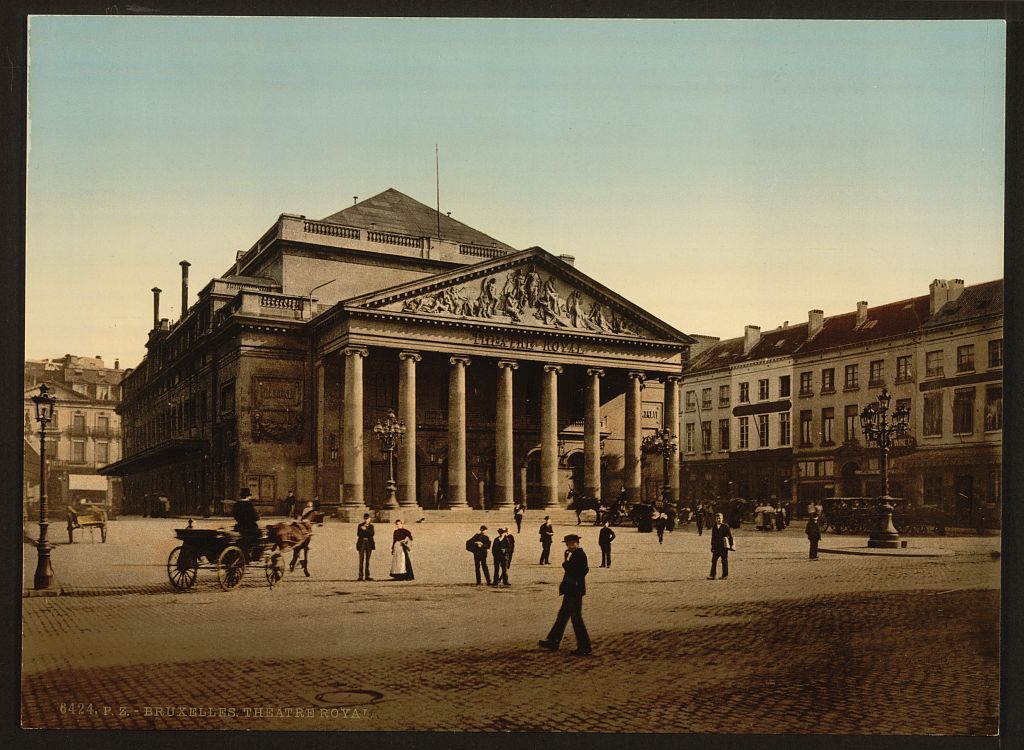
The Place de la Monnaie/Muntplein in the late 19th century

The Hôtel Ostrevant was replaced in 1551–1565 by a funnel-shaped square, the eastern side of which was first occupied by the city's first full-fledged Hôtel des Monnaies/Munthof ("Minting Hall"). This building was decommissioned in 1649 and replaced in 1700 by a theatre, known as the Grand Opera, by the Italian architect and treasurer of Maximilian II Emanuel, Elector of Bavaria, Gio Paolo Bombarda. Bombarda established his theatre on this site in order to take advantage of the large empty space left after the bombardment of Brussels of 1695 by the French army. Around that time, it was decided to create a large square all around this theatre in order to highlight it; this was the embryo of the Place de la Monnaie. Bombarda's theatre was itself demolished in 1820 to allow the development of a new theatre and square, after a project conceived in 1817–1822 by the French architect Louis Damesme.

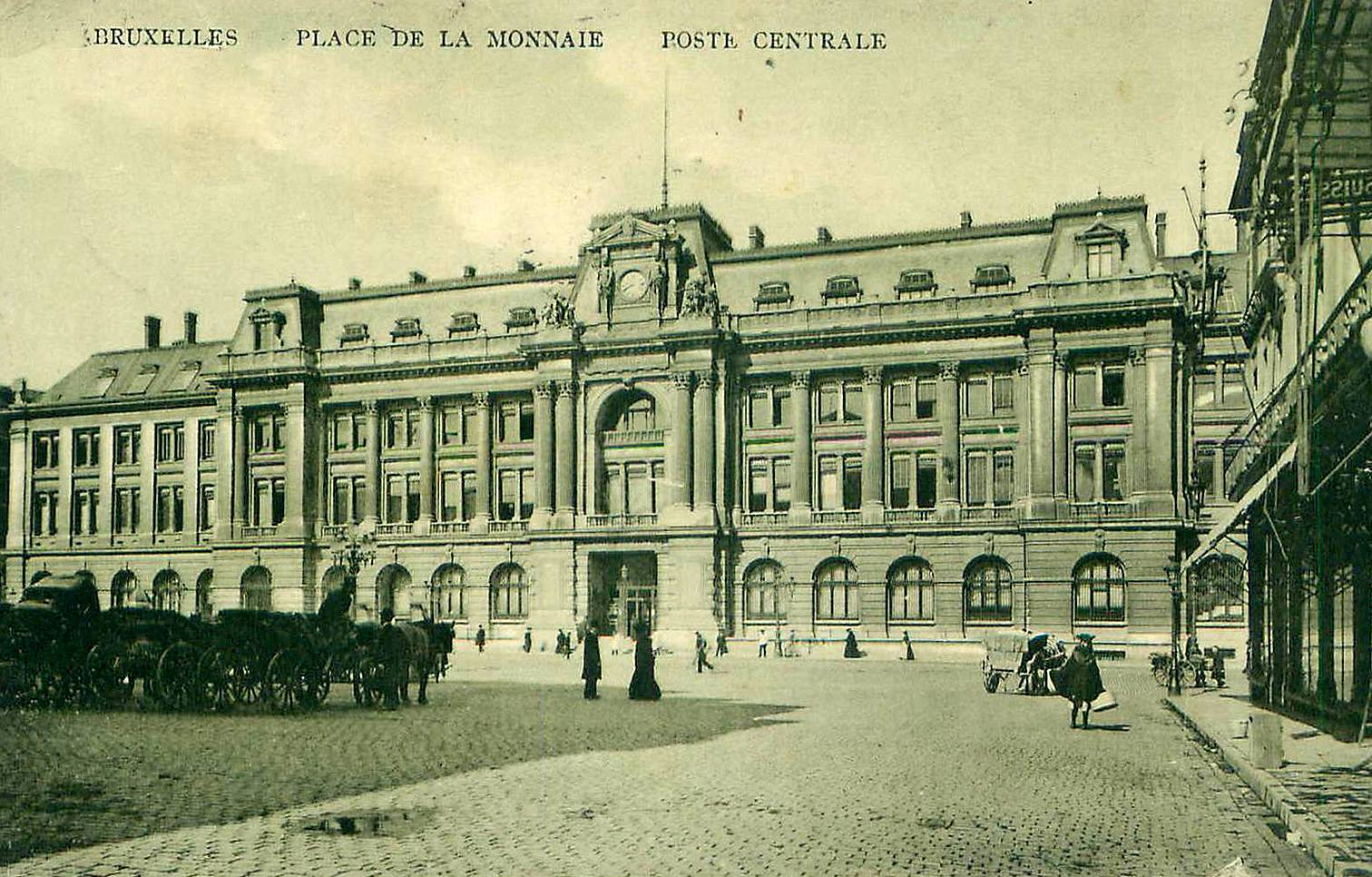
Grand Central Post Office on the Place de la Monnaie, c. 1900

On the western side of the square, a new mint, built in 1649, then rebuilt and extended in 1755, gave way in 1820 to another mint designed in neoclassical style by the architect Charles Vander Straeten. Demolished in 1881–1886, it was in turn replaced in 1892 by the Grand Central Post Office (French: Poste centrale, Dutch: Hoofdpostkantoor), officially the Hôtel des Postes et Télégraphes, an imposing eclectic building by the architect Louis De Curte.

The Grand Central Post Office was razed in 1967–1971, at the same time as the block delimited by the Place de la Monnaie, the Rue de l'Évêque/Bisschopsstraat, the Boulevard Anspach/Anspachlaan and the Rue du Fossé aux Loups/Wolvengracht, to make room for the modernist Monnaie Center by the architects Jacques Cuisinier, Jean Gilson, André and Jean Polak and Robert Schuiten. On that occasion, the square was fitted out in the "above-ground" style of the time with the addition of numerous benches, planters and fountains spread out over its entirety.

=== Redevelopment (2010–2013) ===
The square was completely redeveloped between 2010 and 2012 by the architect Benoît Moritz. The plan was to make the urban space more pleasant by freeing it from the elements that encumbered it; to highlight the monuments flanking it, in particular the Royal Theatre of La Monnaie; as well as to promote its use for entertainment, festivities, or daily use. To do this, significant basement work was carried out: the entire covering was repaved in blue stone with alternating finishes. The theatre and the square were delimited by new contemporary lights arranged in a broken line, and the two kiosks located at the ends of the square were redesigned. In 2013, Muntpunt, a Dutch-language public library built in 1973 at the corner of the Place de la Monnaie and the Rue de l'Ecuyer/Schildknaapsstraat, was also enlarged and revamped.

== Location and accessibility ==
The Place de la Monnaie is one of the most central public spaces in Brussels, located on one of the busiest pedestrian axes in Europe, not far from the Place de Brouckère/De Brouckèreplein and the Boulevard Anspach/Anspachlaan. Its western side lines up with the Rue des Fripiers/Kleerkopersstraat and the Rue Neuve/Nieuwstraat (one of the main commercial streets in Belgium), and on its eastern side, the Royal Theatre of La Monnaie is surrounded on three sides by the Rue des Princes/Prinsenstraat to its north, the Rue Léopold/Leopoldstraat to its east, and the Rue de la Reine/Koninginnestraat to its south.

== Buildings around the square ==
=== Royal Theatre of La Monnaie ===
The most important building on the Place de la Monnaie is the Royal Theatre of La Monnaie, located on its eastern side. It was designed by Louis Damesme and erected between 1817 and 1822 to replace the Grand Opera built in 1700 by Gio Paolo Bombarda. It is from this theatre that the Belgian Revolution started in 1830, after a performance of Auber's opera La Muette de Portici. After a fire on 21 January 1855, the theatre was reconstructed after the designs of Joseph Poelaert. The theatre has been renovated many times. The last renovation dates from 1986 and was carried out by the architectural offices A.2.RC and URBAT, as well as the architect Charles Vandenhove. Nowadays, it is home of the National Opera of Belgium, one of the foremost opera houses in Europe.

=== Monnaie Center ===
On the western side of the square is the Monnaie Center, which replaced the Grand Central Post Office in 1971. This 63-metre-high (207 ft) building houses The Mint shopping centre (ground and basement levels) and provides access to the metro and to four underground parking levels. Until 2022, the upper levels housed the administrative services of the City of Brussels, now located in the nearby Brucity building.

=== Anspach Gallery ===
To the left of the Monnaie Center, a covered shopping gallery, the Anspach Gallery, opens onto the square. The building occupies almost the entire block between the Boulevard Anspach, the Rue de l'Evêque, the Rue des Fripiers and the Rue Grétry. In addition to shops, it comprises a hotel, apartments, the Brussels Casino, as well as access to the metro.

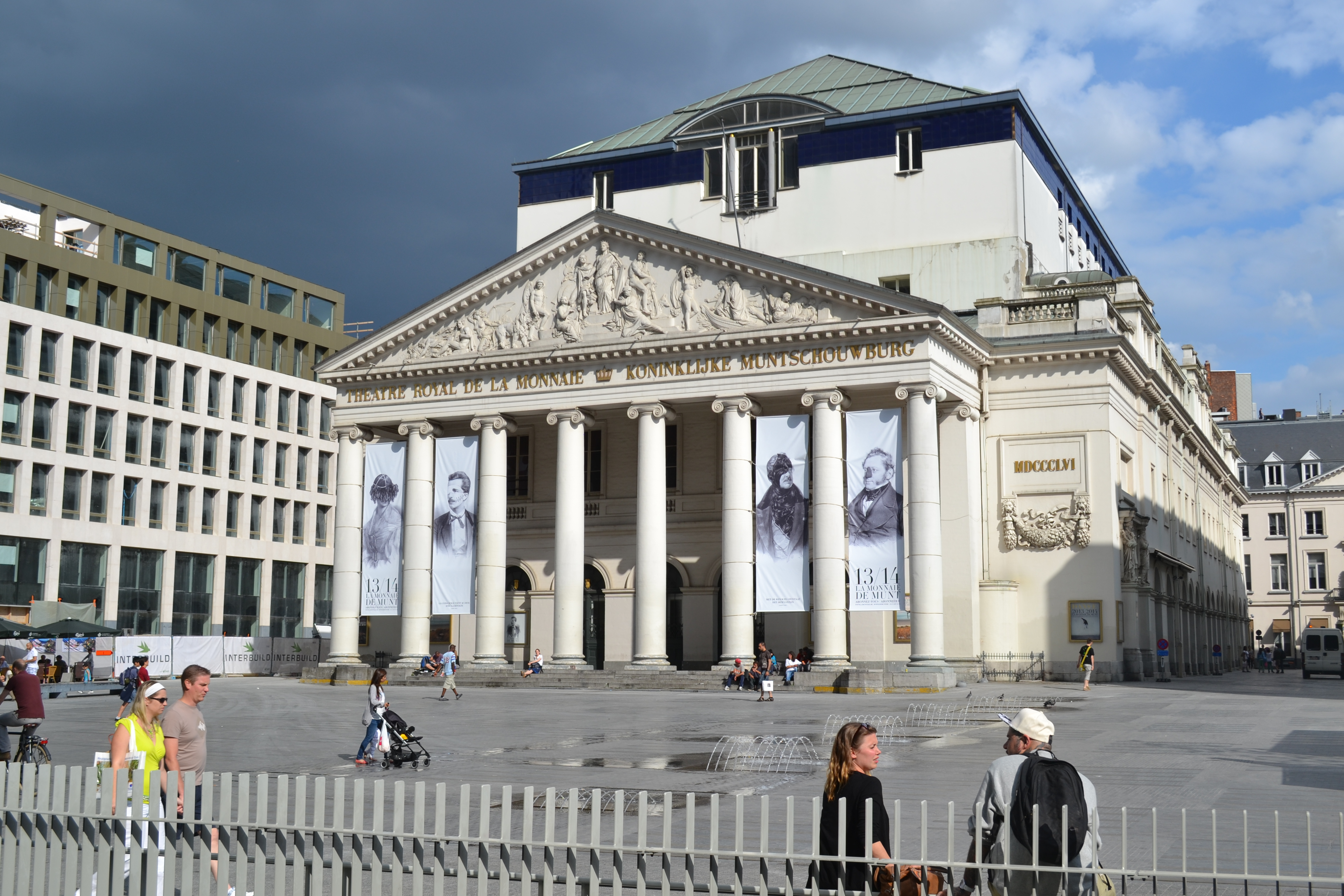
Royal Theatre of La Monnaie (Damesme, 1817–1822 and Poelaert, 1856)

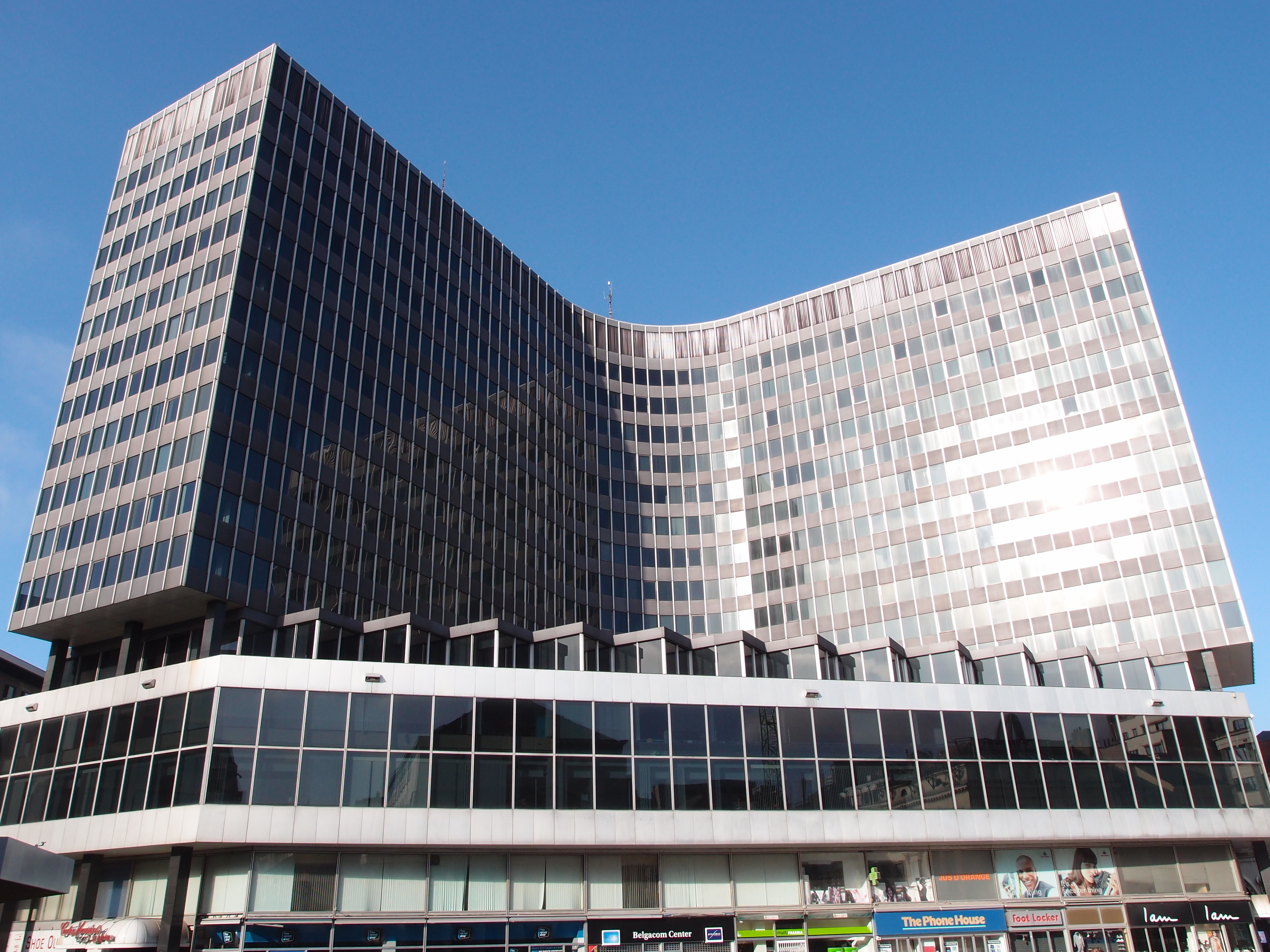
Monnaie Center (Cuisinier, Gilson, Polak and Schuiten, 1967–1971)

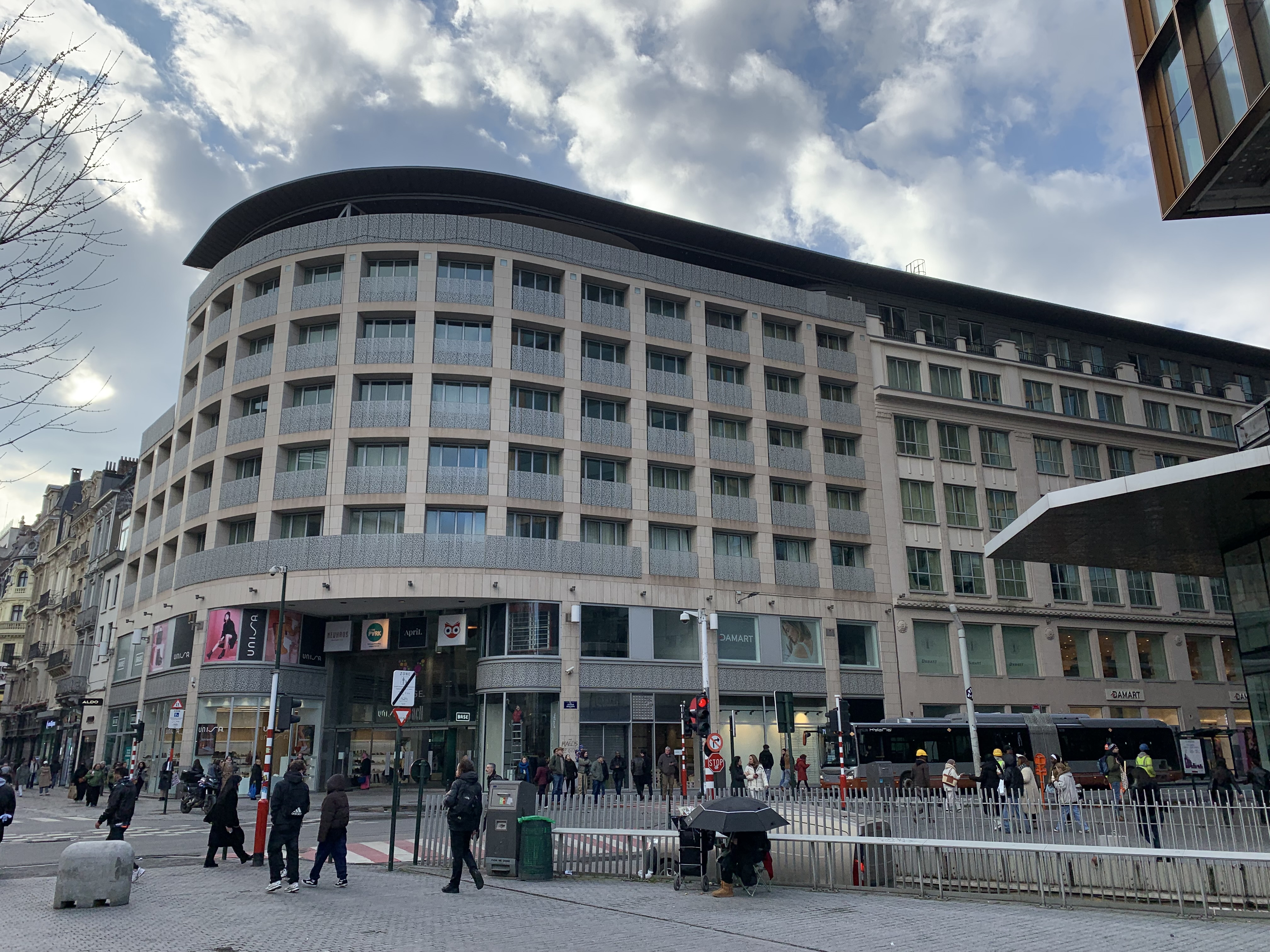
Anspach Gallery (Polak, 1926–27 and Schuiten, 1971)

== See also ==
- Central Boulevards of Brussels
- Neoclassical architecture in Belgium
- History of Brussels
- Belgium in the long nineteenth century
