= Émile Colonne =

French opera singer

Émile Aimable Parfait Colonne
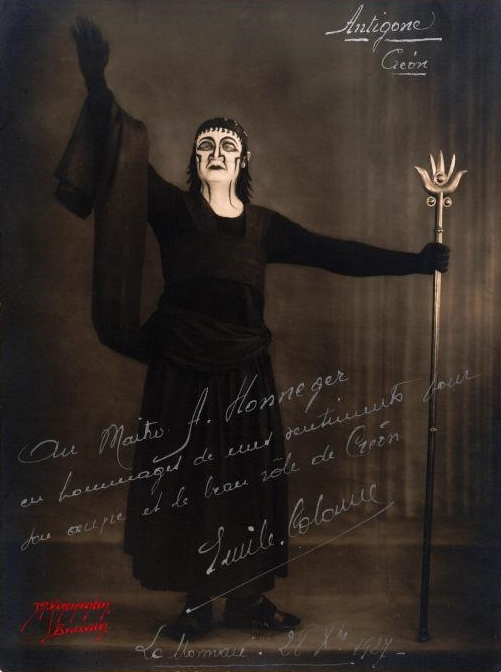
- Émile Colonne as Creon in the 28 December 1927 premiere of Antigone by Arthur Honegger at the Théâtre de la Monnaie in Brussels
- Born: 18 April 1885; Toulon, France
- Died: 13 May 1970 (aged 85); Brussels
- Education: Toulon Conservatory; Marseille conservatory
- Occupations: Baritone; Operatic singer
- Organizations: Théâtre de la Monnaie

Émile Colonne (18 April 1885 – 13 May 1970) was a French baritone, a member of the troupe of the Théâtre de la Monnaie in Brussels.

== Biography ==
Émile Aimable Parfait Colonne was born in Toulon on 18 April 11885 in a modest family. His father was a carpenter and nothing predestined the young apprentice plumber who liked to sing in a lyrical career. A lung disease caused him to take singing lessons as therapeutic breathing exercises. His natural dispositions led him to the conservatory of Toulon and then to the Marseille conservatory where he obtained a First Prize.

On 7 June 1913, he married a young pianist in Toulon: Marie-Louise Bonduel (Toulon, 22 August 1886 - Brussels, 30 November 1970), whose family was linked to personalities such as Claude Debussy, Xavier Leroux and Camille Saint-Saëns. He made his debut on the stage of the Opéra de Toulon. His voice of baritone of opéra comique and his physical appearance as a "young premier" made him noticeable by opera directors who called him on stages all over the country and beyond: Toulouse, Nancy, Strasbourg, Geneva, Algiers, Marseille, Tunis, Nantes.

In 1924 he was hired by Maurice Corneil de Thoran in the troupe of the Théâtre de la Monnaie in Brussels where his career continued until 1952, interspersed with recitals, concerts and roles in other Opera houses such as the Opéra Garnier where he sang Papageno in 1928.

Émile Colonne died 13 May 1970 in Brussels.

== Repertoire ==
Émile Colonne's repertoire consists of 67 roles, including 23 premieres for the Théâtre de la Monnaie, and notably:

Opera

- Boniface: Le Jongleur de Notre-Dame by Jules Massenet
- Créon: Antigone by Arthur Honegger
- Des Grieux: Manon by Jules Massenet
- Don Giovanni: Don Giovanni by Mozart
- Germont: La traviata by Giuseppe Verdi
- Ourrias: Mireille by Charles Gounod
- Pandolphe: Cendrillon by Jules Massenet
- Sancho: Don Quichotte by Jules Massenet
- Il barbiere di Siviglia by Gioachino Rossini
- Grisélidis by Jules Massenet
- Roméo et Juliette by Charles Gounod

Recital

- Don Quichotte à Dulcinée by Maurice Ravel
- La Légende du preux by Aristide Carlo Scassola
- The dream by Franz Schubert
- O Holy Night by Adolphe Adam
