= Opéra du Quai au Foin =

First public theatre in Brussels, Belgium

Coordinates: 50°51′19.08″N 4°20′56.15″E

- Interactive map of Opéra du Quai au Foin
- Address: Brussels; Belgium

Construction
- Opened: January 24, 1682
- Closed: 1697
- Demolished: 1699
- Years active: 1682-1689; 1694-1697

The Opéra du Quai au Foin (French pronunciation: [ɔpeʁa dy kɛ o fwɛ̃]; "Hay Quay Opera") was the first public theatre in Brussels. Opened on 24 January 1682, it was abandoned in 1697 and turned into a warehouse.

== History ==
Under the aegis of the Governor of the Habsburg Netherlands Alexandre Farnese, Gio-Battista Petrucci, royal historian, and Pierre Fariseau, a notable figure in Brussels society, hired a building on the prairies of the Great Béguinage, on the banks of the Quai au Foin, to a squire. In a few months, the building was transformed into a theatre and the decor and props from the palace plays were brought to it. It was opened in 1682 and its opening-night shows lasted throughout the carnival period. Petrucci had over 140 people at his command: actors, musicians and set-operators. The first play put on was Egeo in Atene, an opera by Angelo Vitali, followed by several works by Lully.

Abandoned in 1689, the theatre reopened at the end of 1694 under the joint leadership of Gio Paolo Bombarda and Pietro Antonio Fiocco. It closed for good at the end of 1697 to make room, three years later, for the new "Théâtre sur la Monnoye".
