= Joseph Rogatchewsky =

Russian operatic tenor

Joseph Rogatchewsky (20 November 1891 – 31 March 1985) was a Russian-born operatic tenor.

== Biography ==
Born in Mirgorod (now Ukraine), he came to Paris shortly before the First World War and volunteered in the French army. He then entered the Conservatoire de Paris and obtained a first prize in singing and opera. The Opéra-Comique hired him in 1922 and two years later Maurice Corneil de Thoran invited him to Brussels, at La Monnaie to sing the title role in Werther, which made him famous. The major institutions invited him: the Wiener Staatsoper, the Opéra Garnier, the Concertgebouw of Amsterdam, the Deutsche Oper Berlin opened up to him, but he preferred to stay at the Théâtre de la Monnaie and settle permanently in Brussels. In 1944, he sang José in Carmen at New York City Opera opposite Jennie Tourel.

He played many roles, the most important of which were in Tannhäuser, Parsifal and Lohengrin. However, it is mainly in French opera that he had his greatest successes.

Upon the death of Maurice Corneil de Thoran in January 1953, he was called upon to direct the Théâtre of La Monnaie, a position he held until 1959, giving way to Maurice Huisman. He then was a singing instructor at the Conservatoire royal de Mons.

Preceded by Maurice Corneil de Thoran	director of the Théâtre de la Monnaie	Succeeded by Maurice Huisman
