= Simone Ballard =

French opera singer (1895–1978)

- Simone Ballard as Hubertine in Bruneau's; Le Rêve, performed at La Monnaie in 1933
- Born: 26 March 1895; Sannois, Paris, France
- Died: 8 October 1978 (aged 83); Six-Fours-les-Plages, Var, France
- Education: Conservatoire de Paris
- Occupations: Operatic mezzo-soprano and contralto
- Organizations: La Monnaie

Simone Berthe Ballard (26 March 1895 – 8 October 1978) was a French operatic mezzo-soprano and contralto who sang leading roles, including premieres, at La Monnaie in Brussels.

== Career ==
Simone Ballard was born in Sannois, Paris. Both her parents were engaged at the Paris Opera, her father Louis Ballard as a bass from 1894 to 1897, while her mother, Berthe Bronville (born 6 March 1865 in Paris), made her debut as a soprano in the role of Alice in Meyerbeer's Robert le diable but gave up her career when she married in 1891.

Ballard received early piano education and studied voice at the Conservatoire de Paris with Eugène Lorrain and Jacques Isnardon. She made her debut at the Opera at La Monnaie in 1921 as Amneris in Verdi's Aida. The performance won her an engagement at the house, where she sang until 1940. She took part in world premieres, appearing on 2 May 1926 as the sister-in-law in Milhaud's Les Malheurs d'Orphée; on 28 December 1927 in the title role of Honegger's Antigone; and in 1929 in Prokofiev's Le Joueur.

She appeared in the first stagings of several operas at La Monnaie, including Kseniya's nurse in Mussorgsky's Boris Godunov (1921), Khivria in Mussorgsky's The Fair at Sorochyntsi (1925), Tkatchikha in Rimsky-Korsakov's The Tale of Tsar Saltan (1926), The Mother / The Dragonfly, and the Chinese Cup in Ravel's L'enfant et les sortilèges (1926), Dèbora in Pizzetti's Dèbora e Jaéle (1929), and Orsola in Zandonai's La farsa amorosa (1933). Her about 70 roles included Azucena in Verdi's Il trovatore, Dalila in Samson et Dalila by Saint-Saëns, and the title role in Massenet's Hérodiade. She performed roles in stage works by Wagner, such as Magdalene in Die Meistersinger von Nürnberg, Brangäne in Tristan und Isolde and Fricka in Der Ring des Nibelungen. She also appeared as the Countess in Tchaikovsky's Pique Dame, as Annina in Der Rosenkavalier by Strauss, as the grandmother in de Falla's La vida breve, and as Juno in Offenbach's Orphée aux enfers

Ballard retired from the stage when she married the composer and conductor Albert Wolff in 1940. She died in Six-Fours-les-Plages in the south of France.
