= Antigone (Honegger) =

Opera by Arthur Honegger

- Opera by Arthur Honegger
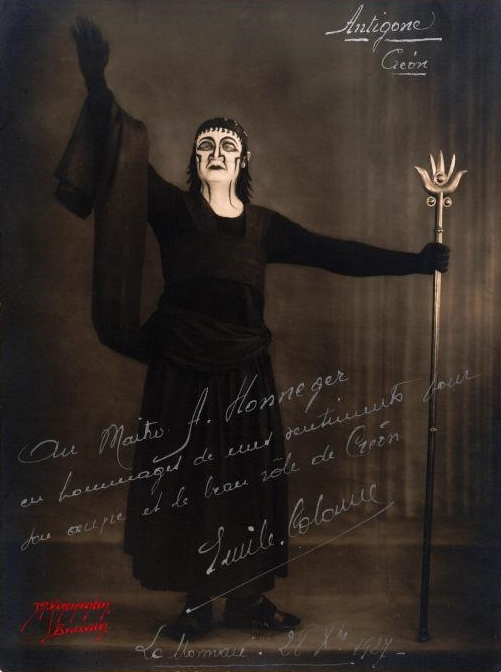
- Émile Colonne as Créon in the 1927 premiere
- Librettist: Jean Cocteau
- Language: French
- Based on: Sophocles' Antigone
- Premiere: 28 December 1927; La Monnaie, Brussels

Antigone is an opera (tragédie musicale) in three acts by Arthur Honegger to a French libretto by Jean Cocteau based on the tragedy Antigone by Sophocles. Honegger composed the opera between 1924 and 1927. It premiered on 28 December 1927 at the Théâtre Royal de la Monnaie with sets designed by Pablo Picasso and costumes by Coco Chanel.

== Background and performance history ==
Honegger had a passionate interest in theatre. Prior to Antigone, he had composed film scores and incidental music for plays as well as an oratorio, Le roi David, which he called a "dramatic psalm" and premiered in 1921. From 1922 Honegger began thinking about adapting the Greek tragedy Antigone by Sophocles as his first opera. He wrote that the plot is "not the standard anecdote of love which is the base of nearly all lyric theatre". The decade between 1920 and 1930 saw several new operas based on works or themes from the past. Like Antigone, Satie's Socrates and Stravinsky's Oedipus rex were based on ancient Greek subjects while both Hindemith's Cardillac and Berg's Wozzeck were based on early 19th century German literature.

Honegger had fallen out with Jean Cocteau in 1921 over Cocteau's reaction to his Le roi David. Both Cocteau and Milhaud had called the work "treasonous" for its failure to adhere to the progressive principles of modern theatre and music which they espoused. However they resolved their differences and Cocteau agreed to collaborate with Honegger on Antigone. In Cocteau's words, his adaptation was a "contraction" of the Sophocles play. He described his method of reworking it as like taking "photographs of Greece from an airplane." Antigone was first performed as a play at the Théâtre de l'Atelier in Paris in 1922 with sets by Picasso, costumes by Coco Chanel, and incidental music by Honegger. Honegger began composing the complete text of the play as a three-act opera in 1924 and completed it in 1927. Cocteau did not participate in the project during its composition stage and did not attend the premiere.

Honegger had first offered Antigone to the Paris Opéra, but they rejected it as "too advanced" for the French public. Instead, it premiered at the Théâtre Royal de la Monnaie on 28 December 1927 in a triple bill with Le pauvre matelot and Shéhérazade using the sets by Picasso and costumes by Coco Chanel that had been designed for the 1922 performance of the play. The opera subsequently had eight more performances at La Monnaie between January and March 1928. In January 1928 it was also given in German translation at the Grillo-Theater in Essen, and in 1930 it was performed in English in New York by the American Laboratory Theatre. While the critical reception of these early performances was generally positive, the audiences were not enthusiastic. This would change in 1943 when Antigone finally received its French premiere at the Paris Opéra with Cocteau designing new sets and costumes for it. The critics called it a "masterpiece" and the audiences were "enthralled", even applauding in the middle of passages. Despite that success, further performances of the opera have been sparse. It was revived by the Paris Opéra in 1952 and 1953. A concert performance in Turin by the Orchestra Sinfonica Nazionale della RAI di Torino was broadcast live on Italian radio in 1958, and a concert performance in Paris by the Orchestre National de France was broadcast live on French radio in 1960.

== Roles ==
Roles, voice types, premiere cast
Role	Voice type	Premiere cast, 28 December 1927 Conductor: Maurice Corneil de Thoran
Antigone	contralto	Simone Ballard
Ismène	soprano	Eglantine Deulin
Eurydice	mezzo-soprano	Melle Gerday
Créon	baritone	Émile Colonne
Hémon	baritone	P. Gilson
Tirésias	bass	Milorad Jovanovitch

== Music ==
Honegger wrote in the preface of the score about his intention to "envelop the drama with a tight symphonic construction without the movement seeming heavy. He was concerned about a clear rendition of the text, taking special care of the consonants, which he described as the "locomotive" of understanding. He later expressed that French composers "show exclusive concern for the melodic design", neglecting diction. Antigone is cited by Robert Dearling as the first classical work to make use of the musical saw, though the term flexatone is used, and Geoffrey Spratt says that act 2, scene 8, "opens with a long treble melismatic line of quite astounding expression and profundity—qualities in no small way attributable to its scoring for saxophone and musical saw."

The work has been described as austere, even severe, avoiding conventional lyricism.
