= House of Jacques-Louis David =

Coordinates: 50.84917°N 4.354582°E

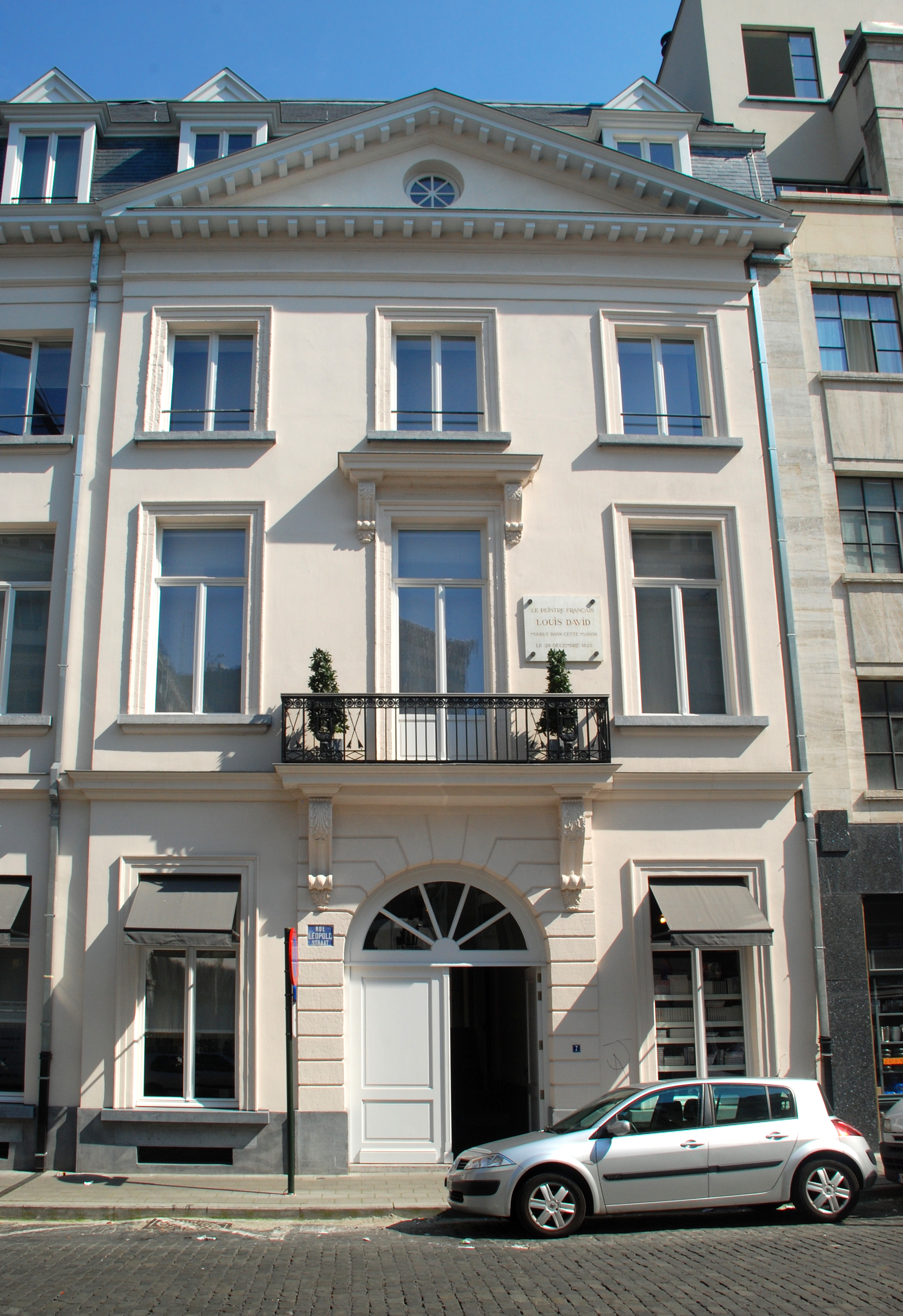
Front view of the house

The House of Jacques-Louis David is a neoclassical building located at 7, rue Léopold (formerly rue Guillaume) in Brussels, Belgium, where the painter died on 29 December 1825.

== History ==
=== The Rue Léopold ===
The rue Léopold was constructed as part of a neoclassical development built between 1819 and 1822, designed by Louis Damesme between 1817 and 1819; the houses on the odd-numbered side (including David's) were built more precisely in 1819–1820.

=== The building ===
Completed in 1820, the building was designed by Louis Damesme, Jean-Baptiste Vifquain, and Henri Partoes.

David's house and those around it (because of their bad condition), were threatened with demolition project in 1991. It qualified for historical monument status provisionally on 26 January 1995 and then permanently on 24 April 1997 under the reference 2043-0239 / 0. It and the buildings immediately next to it were converted into The Dominican hotel as part of an urban regeneration project in 2002.

=== Jacques-Louis David in Brussels ===
Feeling ill at ease in the France of the restoration, David set off with his wife to Brussels in 1816.

In 1820, still painting, he bought a house round the back of the Theatre of La Monnaie, at 679, rue Guillaume (currently number 7).

In 1825, David collided with a carriage. Despite his illness, he insisted that he continue painting. All this did was worsen his health. He died later that year.

== Architecture ==
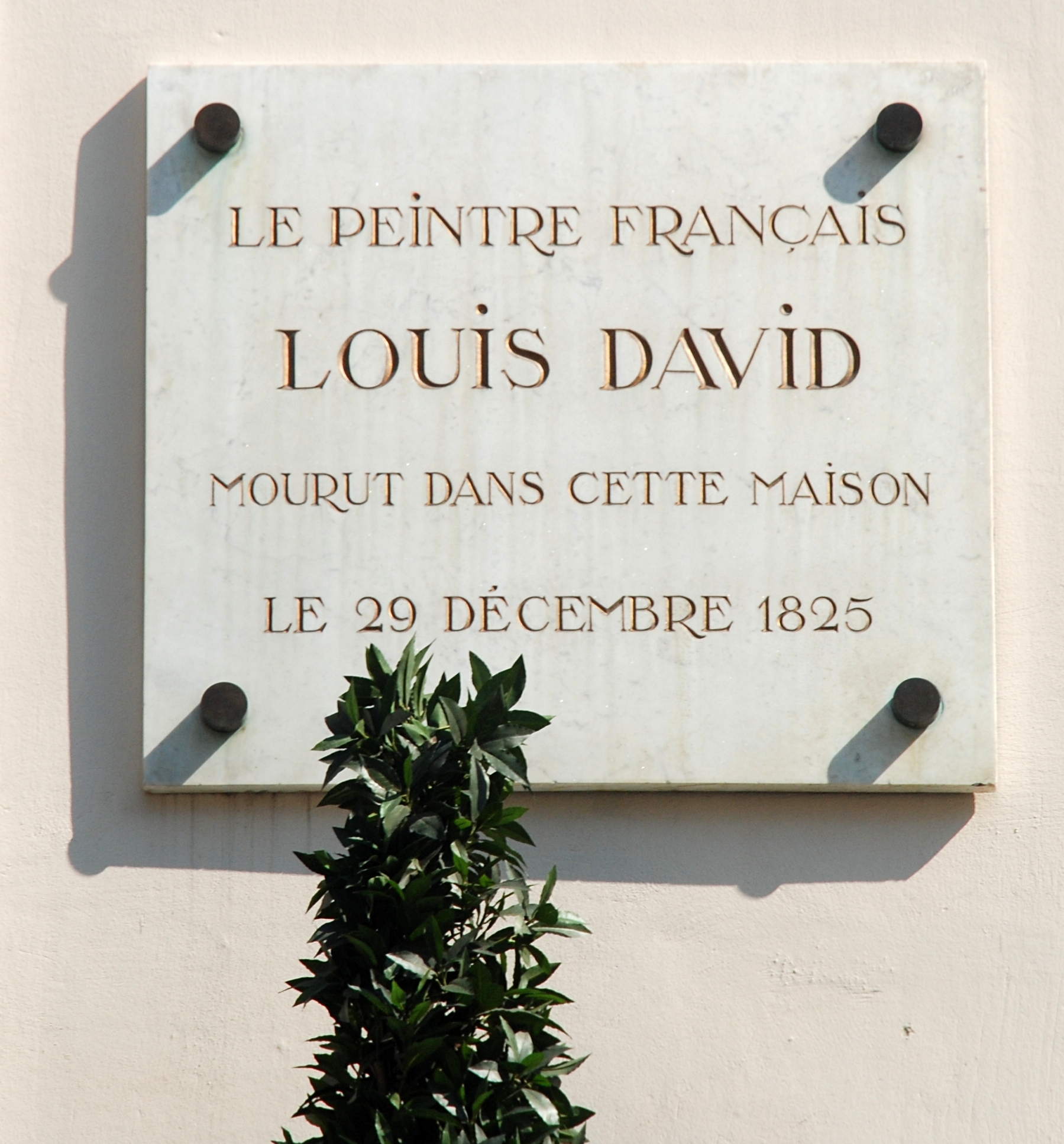
Plaque commemorating David

The facade is coated in plaster and painted white, as is typical of neoclassical architecture. The building is constituted of three bays.

Two pedimented windows pop out from the gambreled roof of the attic, either side of the teethed pediment of the building itself, a recessed bull's eye at the centre.

Two floors below, French doors lead out onto the balcony, enclosed by intricate cast iron railings decorated with arrows and lyres (an Ancient Greek instrument). The pediment to the door, supported by a pair of acanthus-leaf console brackets is mimicked below to prop up the balcony.

The door, topped by a five-part fanlight is surrounded by rusticated masonry.

His death is commemorated by a plaque affixed to the facade of the house: "The French painter Louis David died in this house on December 29, 1825".

== In literature ==
Seeing the derelict building is said by the writer Jean-Luc Seigle to prove as inspiration for his novel The Rite of the Dead Child.

== See also ==
- Neoclassical architecture in Belgium
- Belgium in the long nineteenth century
