= Bombarda (surname) =

Bombarda is a surname. Notable people with the surname include:

- Gio Paolo Bombarda (c. 1650 – 1712), Belgian classical musician
- Mariano Bombarda (born 1972), Argentine footballer
- Miguel Bombarda (1851–1910), Portuguese physician, psychiatrist and politician
- Wilson Bombarda (1930–2026), Brazilian basketball player
