= Igrok =

Igrok may refer to

- The Gambler (novel) (by Dostoevsky)

or

- The Gambler (opera by Prokofiev).
