= Maurice Huisman =

Maurice Huisman (1912 – 23 July 1993) was a Belgian Opera director.

== Life ==
Born in Brussels, a chemist by training, he and his brother Jacques were involved in the founding of the Comédiens routiers, the precursors of the Théâtre national de Belgique established in 1945.

When in 1959 he succeeded Joseph Rogatchewsky at the head of La Monnaie, he developed a policy of international exchange and public outreach, with a particular focus on youth. That same year, he brought some of his dancers and the ballet troupe of La Monnaie to create the highly successful Rite of Spring. Following this, Huisman and Béjart founded the Ballet of the 20th Century in 1960. Wishing to broaden the company's audience, they brought out the dance from the Théâtre de la Monnaie to present Les Quatre Fils Aymon at the Cirque Royal in 1961, the choreographer's first major popular success. This ballet was followed by many others, which made La Monnaie one of the first choreographic scenes in Europe

But Huisman did not abandon the lyrical productions. He involved renowned directors such as Franco Zeffirelli (Rigoletto and Falstaff), Jean-Pierre Ponnelle (several operas by Rossini), and Wieland Wagner (Tristan und Isolde, which premiere took place in Brussels before Bayreuth).

Although he preferred to give young artists and original productions a chance, Huisman nevertheless invited many stars, such as Victoria de los Ángeles, Elisabeth Schwarzkopf, Mario Del Monaco, José Carreras and José van Dam. In 1968, he hiredJacques Brel for the first French version of Man of La Mancha, an adaptation of Dale Wasserman's musical theatre Man of La Mancha, played in Broadway in 1965. The premiere took place at La Monnaie on October 4, 1968 and then in Paris in December.

Huisman also paid attention to the renewal of Baroque music, staging performances of works by (Rameau, Cavalli, Monteverdi) and to 20th century works (Janáček, Alban Berg, Dario Fo, Philip Glass, Bob Wilson).

He died in a car crash.

Preceded by Joseph Rogatchewsky	director of the Théâtre de la Monnaie; 1959-1981	Succeeded by Gerard Mortier
