= Jean-Jacques Amelot de Chaillou =

French politician

Jean-Jacques Amelot de Chaillou (French pronunciation: [ʒɑ̃ ʒak amlo də ʃaju]; 30 April 1689 – 7 May 1749 in Paris) was a French politician. He was marquis of Combrande, baron de Châtillon-sur-Indre, seigneur de Chaillou.

== Biography ==
From a family of magistrates, he was in turn made avocat général aux requêtes de la maison du roi, maître des requêtes ordinaires (1712), intendant of the généralité of La Rochelle (1720–26), intendant des finances (1726), Secretary of State for Foreign Affairs (1737–44) and surintendant des Postes (1737).

He was elected to the Académie française en 1727 et membre honoraire de l'Académie des sciences in 1741.

In 1716 he married the daughter of the businessman and theatre head Gio Paolo Bombarda - she died three years later. His child by his second marriage was Antoine-Jean Amelot de Chaillou.

Political offices
Preceded by Germain Louis Chauvelin	Secretary of State for Foreign Affairs; 1737–1744	Succeeded by Adrien Maurice de Noailles
