= The Gambler (Prokofiev) =

Opera by Sergei Prokofiev

- Opera by Sergei Prokofiev
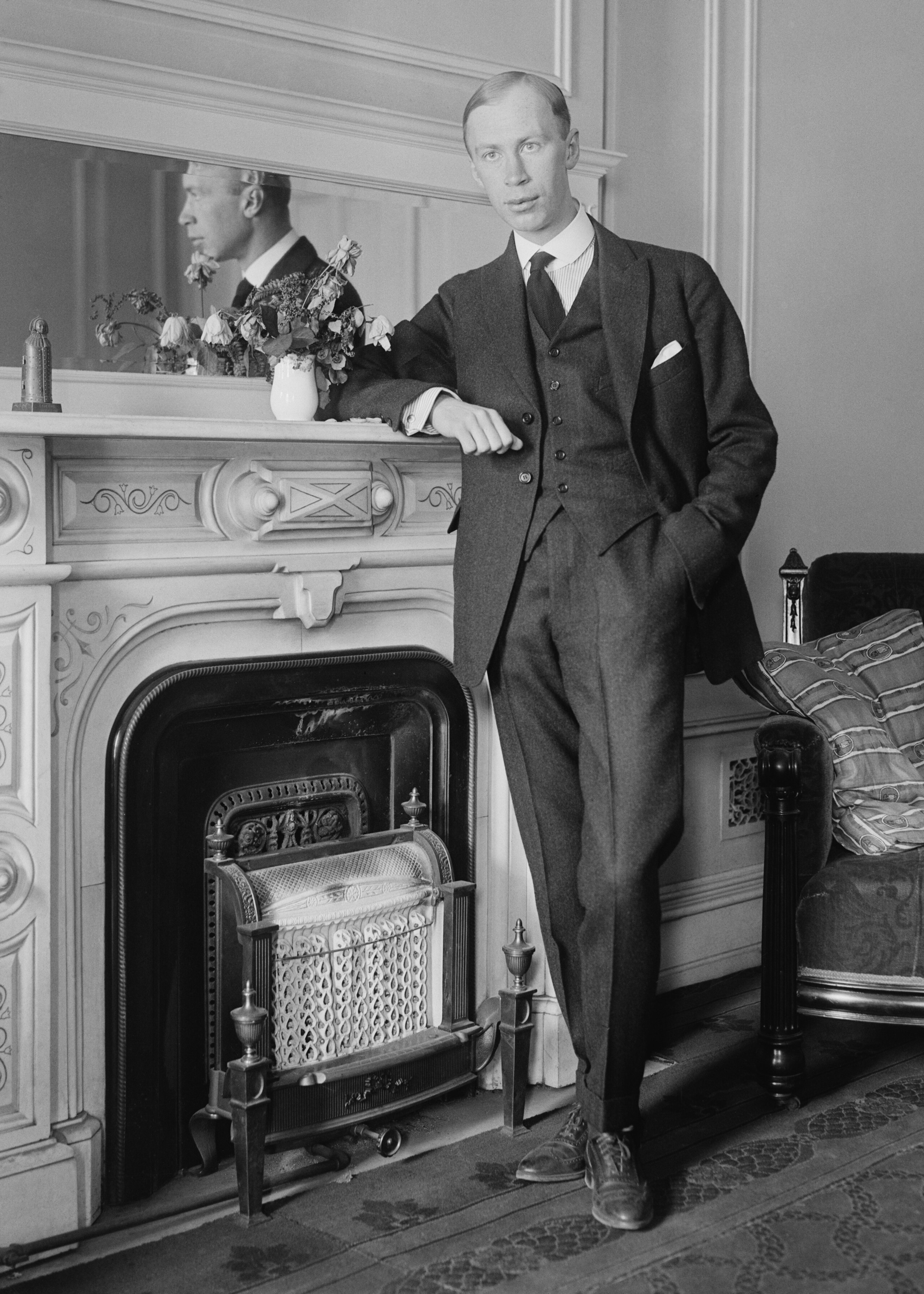
- The composer c. 1918
- Native title: Игрок, Igrok
- Librettist: Prokofiev
- Language: Russian
- Based on: The Gambler by Fyodor Dostoyevsky
- Premiere: April 29, 1929; Théâtre Royal de la Monnaie, Brussels

The Gambler (Russian: Игрок — Igrok in transliteration) is an opera in four acts by Sergei Prokofiev to a Russian libretto by the composer, based on the 1866 story of the same name by Fyodor Dostoyevsky.

Prokofiev had decided on this story as an operatic subject in 1914, and the conductor Albert Coates, of the Mariinsky Theatre, encouraged Prokofiev to compose this opera and assured him of a production at that theatre. Prokofiev wrote the opera in piano score between November 1915 and April 1916, and completed the orchestration in January 1917. Vsevolod Meyerhold was engaged as stage director. However, in the wake of the 1917 February Revolution, that production never occurred.

== Performance history ==
The opera did not receive its first performance until April 29, 1929, after it had been extensively revised (in 1927), at the Théâtre Royal de la Monnaie, Brussels. Prokofiev prepared an orchestral suite based on the opera in 1931 (see below).

The first performance in Italy was given at the Teatro di San Carlo in Naples in 1953 with Elisabetta Barbato as Polina. The Bolshoi Opera performed the opera at the Metropolitan Opera (The Met) in New York City in 1975, but the Met did not mount its own first production until March 2001.

The original version of the opera was finally staged in 2001 at the Bolshoi Theatre, Moscow, conducted by Gennady Rozhdestvensky.

== Roles ==
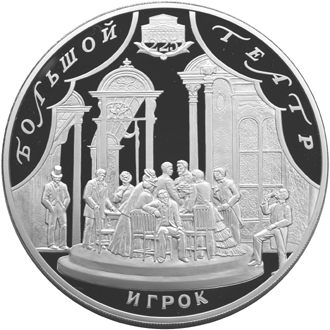
Scene from "The Gambler" on a 100-rouble coin issued to celebrate 225 years of the Bolshoi Theatre

Role	Voice type	Premiere cast Brussels, 29 April 1929 (Conductor: Corneil de Thoran)
Alexei, tutor to the General's family	tenor	José Lens
Polina (Pauline), ward of the General	soprano	Lily Leblanc
The General	basso	Milorad Yovanovitch
Blanche, demimondaine	mezzo-soprano	Yvonne Andry
The Marquis	tenor	G Rambaud
Mr. Astley, an Englishman	baritone	Emile Colonne
The Baroness	silent	Mme Nayaert
The Baron	basso	Georges Clauzure
Grandma ("Babulenka"), The General's aunt	contralto	Simone Ballard
Prince Nilsky	tenor	H Marcotty

== Synopsis ==
Place: Roulettenburg, a fictional European spa resort
Time: The 1860s

=== Act 1 ===
In the Grand Hotel garden, Alexei, tutor to the General's family, meets Polina, the General's ward, who is in debt to the Marquis. Alexei loves Polina, and informs her that he observed her directions to pawn her jewelry and gamble with the funds. However, he lost the money. The General is enamoured of the much younger demimondaine Blanche, and enters with her, the Marquis and Mr Astley, an Englishman. When asked about his losses, Alexei says he lost his own savings. He is chided that someone of his modest income should not gamble, but Alexei dismisses the idea of saving money with a caustic diatribe. Astley is impressed and invites Alexei to tea. The General then receives a telegram from "Babulenka" (literally a diminutive of 'grandmother'; she is, in fact, the General's aunt and Polina's grandmother) in Moscow. The General is hoping that Babulenka will die soon so that he can inherit her money and marry Blanche.

Polina is frustrated that she cannot repay her debts to the Marquis. While Alexei continues to protest that he loves her, she wonders if he has any other interest than greed. The General interrupts their conversation. Polina challenges Alexei to prove his love, and to see if he would truly do anything for her, by making a pass at a German Baroness sitting in the park. Alexei does this, to the anger of the Baron. In the ensuing fuss, the Baron and Baroness leave.

=== Act 2 ===
In the hotel lobby, the General reproaches Alexei for his actions. Alexei is unrepentant, upon which the General dismisses him as his family tutor. The General then tries to obtain the help of the Marquis in preventing any appearance of a scandal. Mr. Astley enters, and explains to Alexei the General's concerns. Blanche had earlier asked the Baron for a loan, which upset the Baroness. Because of the high social status of the Baron and Baroness, the General is keen to avoid any sense of impropriety. Astley further explains that the General cannot propose to Blanche until he receives his share of the inheritance from Babulenka. Alexei begins to think that once Polina receives her own share of the inheritance, the Marquis will attempt to win her over.

The Marquis appears on the General's behalf, to try to mollify Alexei's behaviour. Alexei is contemptuous to the Marquis, until the Marquis produces a note from Polina, which calls on Alexei to stop behaving like a schoolboy. Alexei accuses him of making Polina write the letter and leaves in anger. The Marquis tells the General and Blanche that he was successful in subduing Alexei.

The General predicts Babulenka's death that same evening, but immediately afterward, her voice is heard, as she has arrived at the hotel, in good health. She greets Alexei and Polina with some affection, but at once she sees through the General and the others. She says that she has overcome her illness and plans to recuperate, and gamble, at the spa.

=== Act 3 ===
At the casino, Babulenka has been losing her money at the roulette tables, and ignoring all pleas to stop. The General is despondent and sees his chances with Blanche diminish. After the Marquis tells just how much Babulenka has lost, the General suggests to summon the police but The Marquis dissuades him. Alexei arrives, and the General and the Marquis ask for his help to halt Babulenka's gambling losses. Prince Nilsky, another potential suitor to Blanche, then arrives and further enumerates Babulenka's losses. The General collapses, distraught, and then runs into the casino. Blanche departs with Nilsky. Alexei wonders of what will happen with Polina's family, after Babulenka's financial losses. Babulenka, exhausted and depleted of funds, wants to go home to Moscow. Babulenka asks Polina to come with her, but she declines. The General bewails Babulenka's losses and his own loss of Blanche to Nilsky.

=== Act 4 ===
In his hotel room, Alexei finds Polina, who has a letter from the Marquis. The Marquis says he is selling the General's properties mortgaged to him, but will forgive fifty thousand for Polina's sake, after which he will consider their relationship over. Polina feels this paying her off as an insult and wish she had fifty thousand to fling at Marquis's face. Alexei is deliriously pleased that Polina has turned to him for assistance.

Rushing to the casino, Alexei has a run of good luck, winning twenty times in a row and breaking the bank. After an entr'acte, the other patrons continue to talk about Alexei's run. Alexei returns to his room, yet he continues to hear the voices of the croupiers and the other gamblers. He then becomes aware of Polina who has been waiting for him. He offers her funds to pay the Marquis back. She refuses and asks whether he really loves her. When Alexei gives her the money, she tosses it back in his face and runs out. The opera ends with Alexei alone in the room, recalling obsessively his success at the tables.

== Recordings ==
- Revised version (Melodiya CD 10 01271): Vladimir Makhov, Gennadiy Troitskiy, Nina Polyakova, Tamara Antipova; All-Union Radio Opera Chor, Symphony Orchestra of All-Union Radio and Television, Gennady Rozhdestvensky, conductor (1963 recording)
- Revised version (Philips 454 559): Nikolai Gassiev, Ljubov Kazarnovskaya, Marianna Tarassova, Valery Lebed, Sergey Aleksashkin, Vladimir Galusin, Elena Obraztsova, Alexander Shubin, Andrei Khramtsov, Elena Mirtova, Erik Eglit, Evgeny Kochergin, Gennadi Bezzubenkov, Gennady Anikin, Gregory Zastavny, Lia Shevtzova, Liubov Sokolova, Liudmilla Kannunnikova, Olga Kondina, Sergei Naida, Sergei Yukhmanov, Vladimir Zhivopistsev, Yevgeny Fedotov, Yuri Dolgopolov, Yuri Zhikalov; Kirov Orchestra of the Mariinsky Theatre; Valery Gergiev, conductor (1996 recording)
- Original version (Exton OVCL-00155): Mikhail Urusov, Olga Guryakova, Leonid Zimnenko, Elena Manistina, Pavel Kudryavchenko, Vladislav Verestnikov, Evgenia Segeniuk; Soloists of the Bolshoi Opera; The Bolshoi Theatre Orchestra; Gennady Rozhdestvensky, conductor (2001 recording)
- Video (UITV; Kultur in the USA): Misha Didyk (Alexei); Kristīne Opolais (Polina); Vladimir Ognovenko (General); Stefania Toczyska (Babulenka); Stephan Rügamer (Marquis); Sylvia de la Muela (Blanche); Viktor Rud (Mr. Astley); Staatskapelle Berlin; Daniel Barenboim, conductor (2008 recording)
- Video (Mariinsky 0536): Sergei Aleksashkin (General); Tatiana Pavlovskaya (Polina); Vladimir Galuzin (Alexei); Nikolai Gassiev (Marquis); Alexander Gergalov (Mr Astley); Nadezhda Serdyuk (Mlle Blanche); Andrei Popov (Prince Nilsky); Oleg Sychev (Baron Wurmerhelm); Andrei Spekhov (Potapych); Mariinsky Orchestra; Valery Gergiev, conductor (2010 recording)

== Suite: Four Portraits and a Dénouement from The Gambler, op. 49 ==
Prokofiev produced an orchestral suite from the opera in 1931. The four portraits are Alexei, Babulenka, the General and Polina; the dénouement is not, in fact, the last scene of the opera, but represents Alexei's winning streak at roulette. As The Gambler is not a number opera, none of the characters has any extended arias; Prokofiev, therefore, gathered the basic materials for the suite by tearing up the score and heaping the pages relating to each character together in piles.
