= Comédiens routiers =

The Comédiens routiers was a group of amateur actors. In 1929, they were founded within the Scouts de France by Léon Chancerel.

In Belgium, Maurice Huisman and his brother Jacques Huisman also created a troupe of Comédiens routiers in 1935.

== Bibliography ==
- Gignoux, Hubert (1984). Histoire d'une famille théâtrale (Jacques Copeau, Léon Chancerel, les Comédiens routiers, La Décentralisation dramatique). Lausanne: L'aire /ANRAT.
- Romain, Maryline (2005). Léon Chancerel: portrait d'un réformateur du théâtre français, 1886-1965. Éditions L'Âge d'Homme. p. 429. ISBN 9782825119631.
