= Ercole Bernabei =

Italian composer

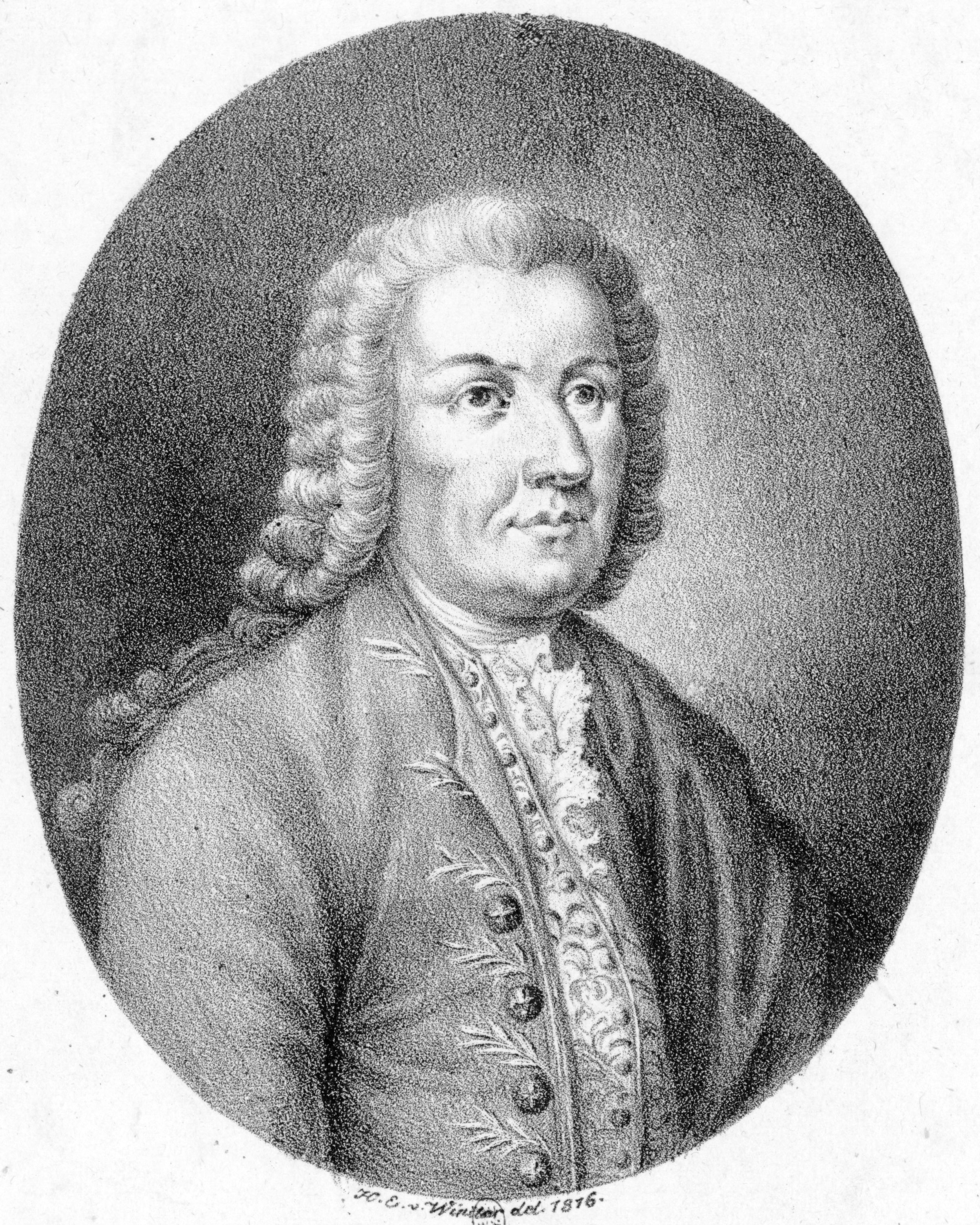
Bernabei

Ercole Bernabei (Caprarola (Latium), 1622 – Munich, 5 December 1687) was an Italian composer, chapel master and organist.

Bernabei was born in Caprarola, and became a pupil of Orazio Benevoli in Rome. From 1653 he served as organist at San Luigi dei Francesi as successor of Luigi Rossi. In July 1665 Bernabei was appointed maestro di cappella at the Archbasilica of St. John Lateran. And from 1672 to 1674 he hold this post at the Cappella Giulia in St. Peter's Basilica thanks to the protection of Christina, Queen of Sweden.

In July 1674 Bernabei and his pupil Agostino Steffani moved to Munich, where he superseded Johann Caspar von Kerll as Hofkapellmeister of Ferdinand Maria duke of Bavaria and an elector (Kurfürst) of the Holy Roman Empire.

His daughter married another expatriate Italian musician, Gio Paolo Bombarda.

He was father to the composer Giuseppe Antonio Bernabei (Rome, 1649 – Munich, 9 March 1732).

Ercole Bernabei died in Munich on 5 December 1687.

== Works ==
=== Operas ===
- La conquista del vello d'oro in Colco (booklet of D. Gisberti, 1674, Monaco)
- I portenti dell'indole generosa, ovvero Enrico terzo imperatore, duca di Baviera (booklet of D. Gisberti, 1675, Monaco)
- Il litigio del cielo e della terra (booklet of V. Terzago, 1680, Monaco)
- Erote ed Anderote (booklet of V. Terzago, 1686, Monaco)

=== Secular music ===
- Concerto madrigalesco a tre voci diverse (3 voices and continuo) (Rome, 1669)
- cantatas for soprano and continuo (manuscript)

=== Sacred music ===
- Sacrae modulationes op. 2 (5 voices, 2 violins and continuo) (Munich 1691)
- 2 Masses for 16 voices in 4 choirs
- 23 sacred works (motettos, hymns, antiphons, 4-8 voices)
