= Gio Paolo Bombarda =

Belgian musician

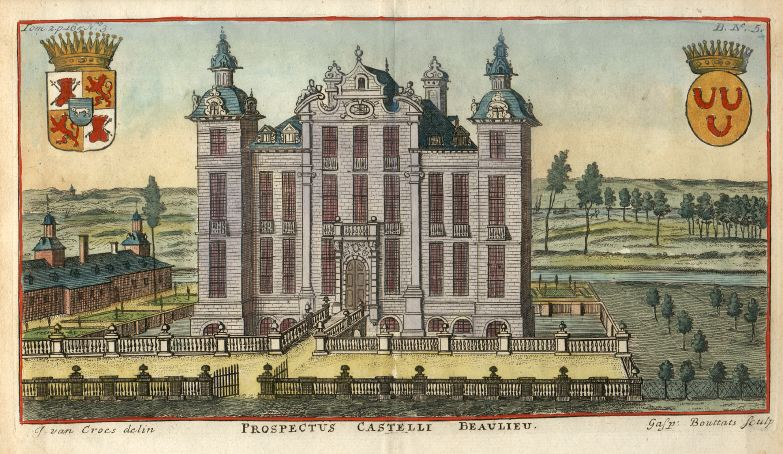
The château de Beaulieu, residence of Bombarda (engraving by Jacques Harrewyn)

Gio Paolo Bombarda, also known as Jean-Paul (de) Bombarda, (Rome, c. 1650 or 1660 – Paris, 1712) was an Italian architect, and an advisor and treasurer to Maximilian II Emanuel, Elector of Bavaria. Bombarda was also the founder of the Théâtre de la Monnaie in Brussels.

== Life ==
Musician, councillor and treasurer to Maximilian II Emanuel, Elector of Bavaria in Munich, he was taken on by the court orchestra in 1680 and, in 1686, he married the daughter of the composer Ercole Bernabei. When Maximilian became governor of the Spanish Netherlands in 1692, Bombarda went with him to Brussels and became his emissary to the French and Dutch bankers. In 1693 he married his second wife, in Amsterdam, the daughter of the Antwerp banker Cloots. In 1694 Bombarda and Pietro Antonio Fiocco rented the Opéra du Quai au Foin, managing it for three years.

After the Bombardment of Brussels by French troops under maréchal de Villeroy, Maximilien-Emmanuel entrusted Bombarda with the construction of a new theatre right in the heart of the city – the Théâtre sur la Monnoye, which opened in 1700. The Académie royale de musique in Paris was then in financial difficulties and its director Jean-Nicolas de Francine was unable to remedy the situation alone. The able financier Bombarda was thus called to the Académie in 1703 and left the elector's services to set up himself and his family in Paris in 1705, in a house on rue d'Argenteuil, not far from the Palais-Royal, where he died in 1712.

== Children ==
His eldest daughter, Anne-Marie-Pauline (1697–1719), married Jean-Jacques Amelot de Chaillou in 1716, whilst his son Pierre-Paul (1698–1783), known as Bombarde de Beaulieu, in 1718 married the daughter of the famous salonnière Madame Doublet.

== Succession ==
Preceded by Founder	Head of the Théâtre de la Monnaie; 1700–1702	Succeeded by Domenico Lorenzoni & Giuseppe Contri
Preceded by Domenico Lorenzoni & Giuseppe Contri	Head of the Théâtre de la Monnaie; 1704–1705	Succeeded by Jean Barrier, called Fonpré

== See also ==
- Bombardopolis, Haiti
