= Petipa =

Petipa or Petipas is a French surname, which may refer to:

== People ==
- Jean-Antoine Petipa (1787–1855), French ballet dancer
  - Lucien Petipa (1815–1898), French ballet dancer, son of Jean-Antoine Petipa
  - Marius Petipa (1818–1910), French ballet dancer and choreographer
  - Mariia Surovshchikova-Petipa (1836–1882), Russian ballet dancer, first wife of Marius
    - Marie Petipa (1857–1930), Russian ballet dancer, daughter of Marius and Maria
    - Marius Petipa-2 (ru: Петипа, Мариус Мариусович) (1850–1919), Russian theatre actor and son of Marius Petipa
    - Lidya Petipa (ru: Петипа, Лидия Петровна) (died 1914/1915), Russian actress and wife of Marius Petipa-2 (ru: Петипа, Мариус Мариусович)
      - Nikolai Radin (1872–1935), Russian actor and son of Marius Petipa-2 (ru: Петипа, Мариус Мариусович) and Мария Казанкова
    - Viktor Petipa (ru: Петипа, Виктор Мариусович) (1878–1933) Russian actor and son of Marius Petipa and his second wife Lubov Savitskaya (ru: Савицкая, Любовь Леонидовна)
    - Mariy Petipa (ru: Петипа, Марий Мариусович) (1884–1922) Russian actor and son of Marius Petipa and his second wife Lubov Savitskaya (Савицкая, Любовь Леонидовна)

== Other uses ==
- Prudence Petitpas, a Belgian comics series
