= Louis Damesme =

French architect

- Born: Louis Emmanuel Aimé Damesme; 19 April 1757; Magny-en-Vexin, France
- Died: 3 November 1879 (aged 122); Paris, France
- Occupation: Architect
- Buildings: Royal Theatre of La Monnaie

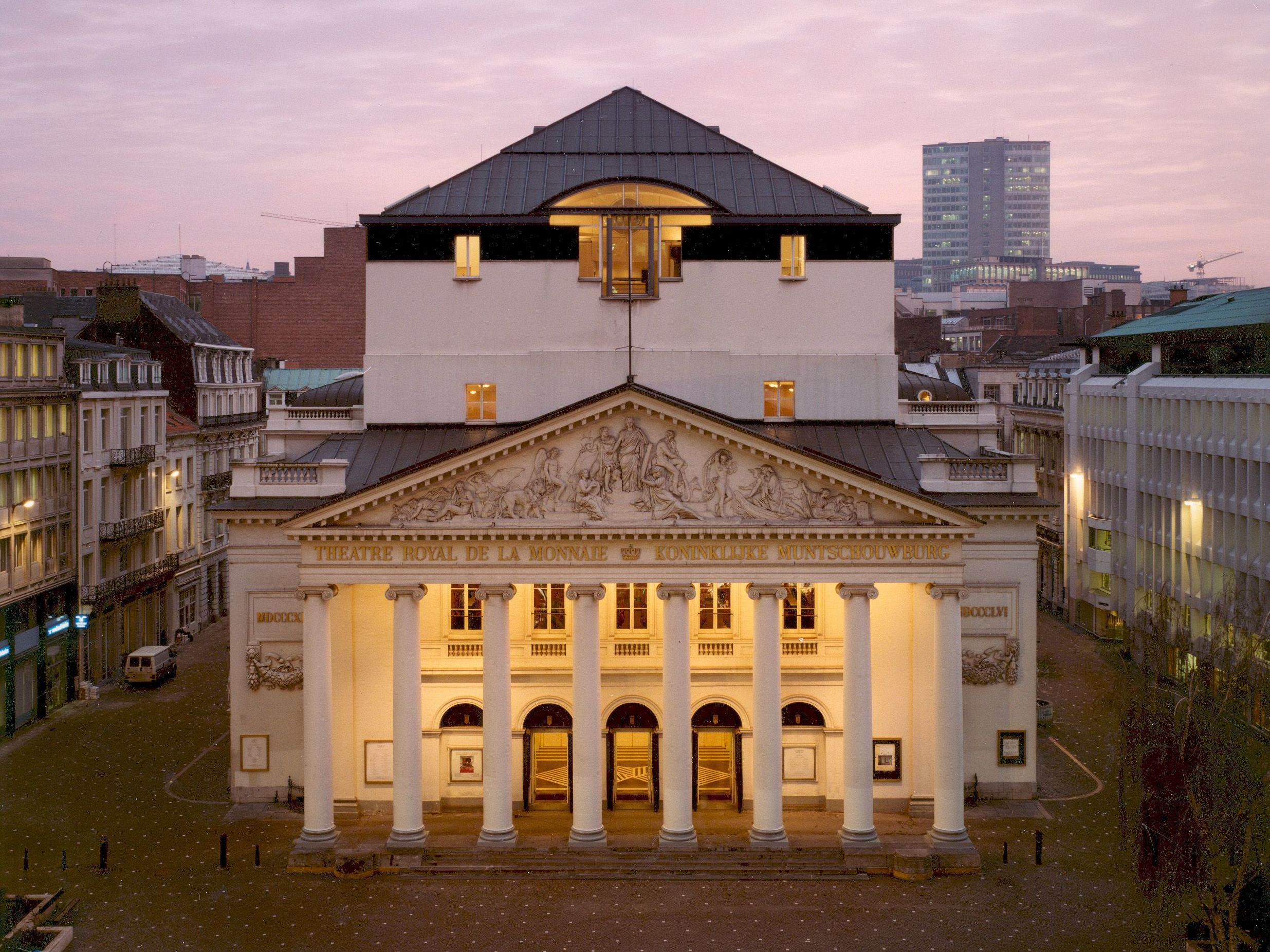
Royal Theatre of La Monnaie, Brussels

Louis Emmanuel Aimé Damesme (French pronunciation: [lwi emanɥɛl ɛme damɛm]) was a French architect famous for designing the Royal Theatre of La Monnaie and the House of Jacques-Louis David, in Brussels. He was born in Magny-en-Vexin on 19 April 1757 and died in Paris on 14 April 1822. Damesme was head of the architectural studio of Claude-Nicolas Ledoux.

== Biography ==
As a draftsman in Ledoux's architectural studio, Damesme befriended Jean-Nicolas Sobre. Together, they set up rue and carré Saint-Martin, # 16, a meeting room for a Masonic lodge. In 1786, during the construction of the enclosure of the farmers general, Damesme was head of the Ledoux workshop. On the 21st, during Ledoux's funeral, Cellerier, Dufourny, Vignon and Damesme held the cords of the mortuary cloth. He is buried in Père Lachaise Cemetery.

== List of projects ==
- Théâtre de la Loge Olympique, on the Rue de la Victoire, Paris (9th arrondissement).
- His own home, and a factory, on the Rue Richer, Paris (9th arrondissement), 1788 : On land acquired in association with a man named "Goyer", Damesme built his own house and a factory, for a Flemish brewer called "Weel".
- Multiple buildings, on the Rue Saint-Honoré, Paris (1st arrondissement), 1806: For the biens nationaux, Damesme designed a project on the site of the convent of The Three Sisters of the Conception.
- Châtillon hotel, (Numbers 136-140) on the Rue du Bac, Paris (7th arrondissement)
- Château de Sillery, Épinay-sur-Orge (Essonne): Damesme designed the château and the gardens.
- Château de Viry, Viry-Châtillon (Essonne): Landscaping for the Duchess of Raguse, née Anne Marie Hortense Perrégaux (1779-1855), wife of Marshal Auguste de Marmont, who inherited the estate from her father, the banker Jean-Frédéric Perrégaux, in 1808. Destroyed in 1950. Only the Gothic pavilion remains.
- Château de Courson, Courson-Monteloup (Essonne): he designed some outbuildings and stables for the Duke of Padua.
- Town Hall of Magny-en-Vexin (Val-d'Oise).
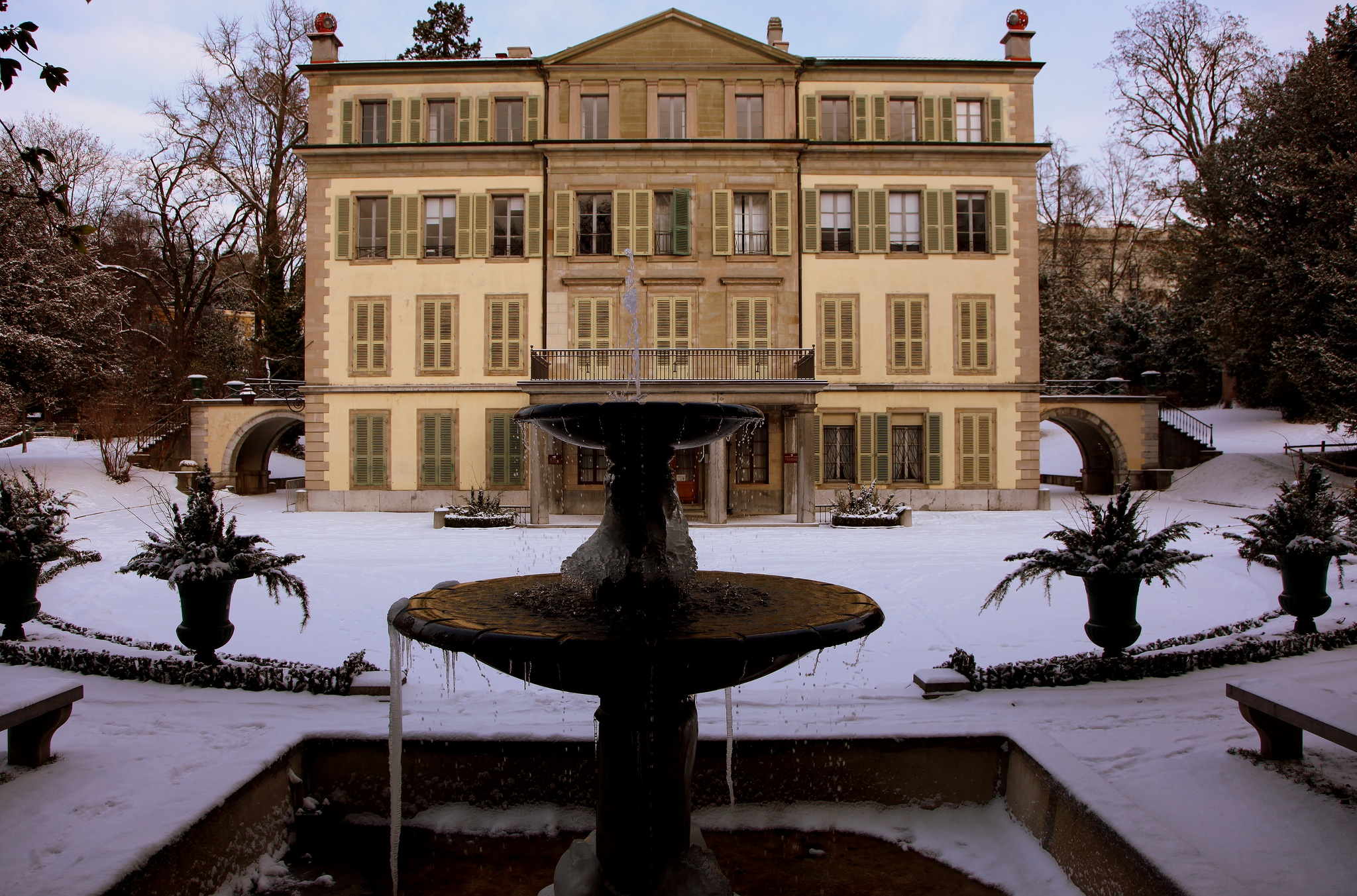
  Mon Repos de Campagne
- Royal Theatre of La Monnaie, Brussels: Damesme was called upon to rebuild the old theater, which was demolished due to safety concerns in 1818. The new building was opened on 25 May 1819. After a fire in 1855, the building was reconstructed according to the plans.
- House of Jacques-Louis David, Brussels, 1818–1819.
- New Prisons of Brussels
- Remodeling and expansion, construction of outbuildings (notably stables) for Mon-Repos de campagne, in Lausanne, Switzerland, at the request of the banker Vincent Perdonnet (1818-1821)
