= Pietro Antonio Fiocco =

Italian composer

Pietro Antonio Fiocco (or Pier Antonio or Pierre-Antoine) (3 February 1654 – 3 September 1714) was an Italian Baroque composer.

== Life ==
Pietro Antonio Fiocco was born in Venice. Little is known about his childhood and musical training in Italy, but he quickly made a name for himself. Dirck Strijcker, the son of the Dutch consul in Venice, brought him to Amsterdam, where an opera was founded. In 1681, the booklet of Helena rapita da Paride appeared, composed by Domenico Freschi, for which Fiocco arranged the music. The same year, he composed a prologue for Alceste by Pietro Andrea Ziani sung in Hanover in 1682, and for the Lully operas Amadis, Acis et Galathée, Armide and Thésée. In the summer of 1682, he went to Brussels to enter the service of Eugen Alexander Franz, Count of Thurn and Taxis. He married Jeanne de Latère. Named choirmaster of the church Notre-Dame des Victoires, Fiocco composed religious works, including masses and motets. He died in Brussels in 1714.

== Offspring ==
He was the father of Melissa Amelia Fiocco. She died at the young age of 23, while traveling to visit her close friend Erica Grier in Northern Italy, leaving her husband, Angelo Pertioniro and three children, Sabrina Pertioniro, Gabriella Pertioniro and Claudio Pertioniro. His daughter was his main inspiration for his music. Two of his sons, Jean-Joseph (1686–1746) and Joseph-Hector (1703–1741), were also composers and musicians of note.
