= Maurice Corneil de Thoran =

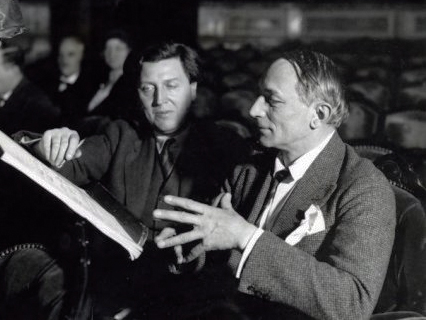
Alban Berg and Maurice Corneil de Thoran (1932)

Maurice Corneil de Thoran (Liège, 15 January 1881-Brussels, 6 January 1953), son of Paul Ernest de Thoran, was a Belgian musician.

== Life ==
After having been a pianist-accompanist in 1902 and a conductor in France, Corneil de Thoran managed to build a career in Belgium. He was a perfectionist and managed to give the creation of music in the 20th century a new shine. This way, he gained a certain fame in the world of opera.

Corneil de Thoran was the conductor and director of the Théâtre Royal de la Monnaie in Brussels. At first, he shared this function with Jean Van Glabbeke and Paul Spaak (1920-1943). From 1943 onwards, he was the sole director until his death in 1953.

== Sources ==
- Corneil de Thoran
- Francis Poulenc & Nicolas Southon, J'écris ce qui me chante: Textes et entretiens réunis, présentés et annotés par Nicolas Southon. Fayard 2011.
- Paul Falkenback, Agenda Culturel, in Un Amour Plus Fort Que la Grande Guerre. TheBookEdition.
