= La Monnaie =

Opera house in Brussels, Belgium

La Monnaie De Munt
- Théâtre royal de la Monnaie (French); Koninklijke Muntschouwburg (Dutch)
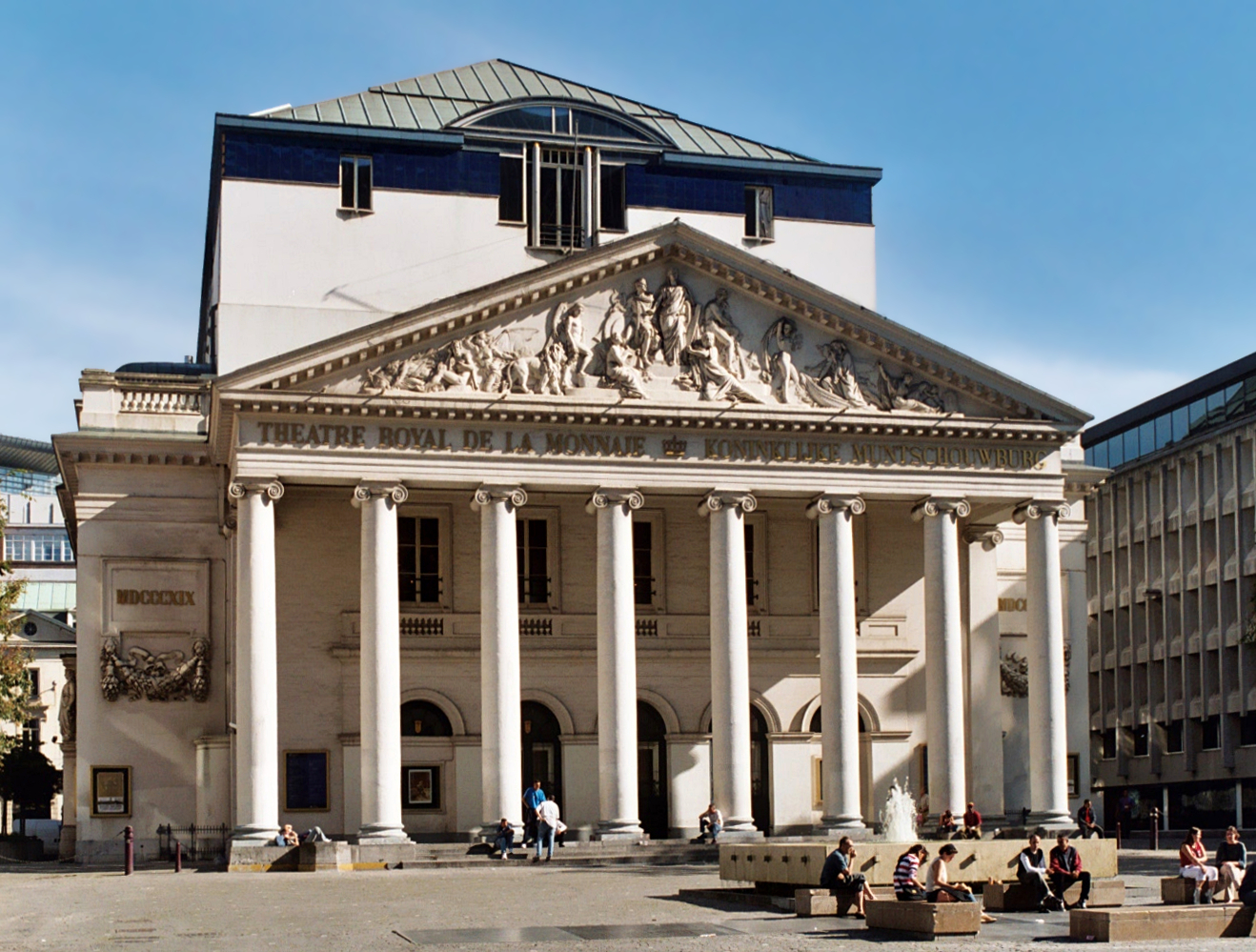
- The Royal Theatre of La Monnaie seen from the Place de la Monnaie/Muntplein
- Interactive map of La Monnaie; De Munt
- Former names: Théâtre de la Monnoye (1700–1819)
- Address: Place de la Monnaie / Muntplein; 1000 City of Brussels, Brussels-Capital Region; Belgium
- Coordinates: 50°50′59″N 4°21′14″E
- Owner: Régie des Bâtiments
- Operator: Peter de Caluwe
- Seating type: Armchairs
- Capacity: 1,152
- Type: Opera house
- Events: Opera, concert, recital, dance
- Public transit: 1 4 5 10 De Brouckère

Construction
- Built: 1695–1700
- Opened: 17 October 1700
- Renovated: 1856, 1985, 2017
- Architects: 1819: Louis Damesme; 1856: Joseph Poelaert

Website
- www.lamonnaie.be/en

The Royal Theatre of La Monnaie (French: Théâtre royal de la Monnaie, pronounced [teɑtʁ ʁwajal də la mɔnɛ]; Dutch: Koninklijke Muntschouwburg, pronounced [ˈkoːnɪŋkləkə ˈmʏntsxʌuˌbʏr(ə)x]; both translating as the "Royal Theatre of the Mint") is an opera house in central Brussels, Belgium. The National Opera of Belgium, a federal institution, takes the name of this theatre in which it is housed—La Monnaie in French or De Munt in Dutch—referring to the building as well as the opera company. As Belgium's leading opera house, it is one of the few cultural institutions to receive financial support from the Federal Government of Belgium. Other opera houses in Belgium, such as the Vlaamse Opera and the Opéra Royal de Wallonie, are funded by regional governments.

La Monnaie is located on the Place de la Monnaie/Muntplein, not far from the Rue Neuve/Nieuwstraat and the Place de Brouckère/De Brouckèreplein. The current edifice is the third theatre on the site. The façade dates from 1818 with major alterations made in 1856 and 1986. The foyer and auditorium date from 1856, but almost every other element of the present building was extensively renovated in the 1980s.

== History ==
=== The theatre of Gio-Paolo Bombarda (1700–1818) ===
The first permanent public theatre for opera performances of the court and City of Brussels was built between 1695 and 1700 by the Venetian architects Paolo and Pietro Bezzi, as part of a rebuilding plan following the bombardment of Brussels of 1695 by the French army. It was erected on the site of a building that had served to mint coins. The name of this site—La Monnaie (originally spelled La Monnoye) in French or De Munt in Dutch (both meaning "The Mint")—remained attached to the theatre for the centuries to come. The construction of the theatre had been ordered by Maximilian II Emanuel, Elector of Bavaria, at that time Governor of the Habsburg Netherlands. The Elector had charged his treasurer and architect, the Italian Gio Paolo Bombarda, with the task of financing and supervising the enterprise.

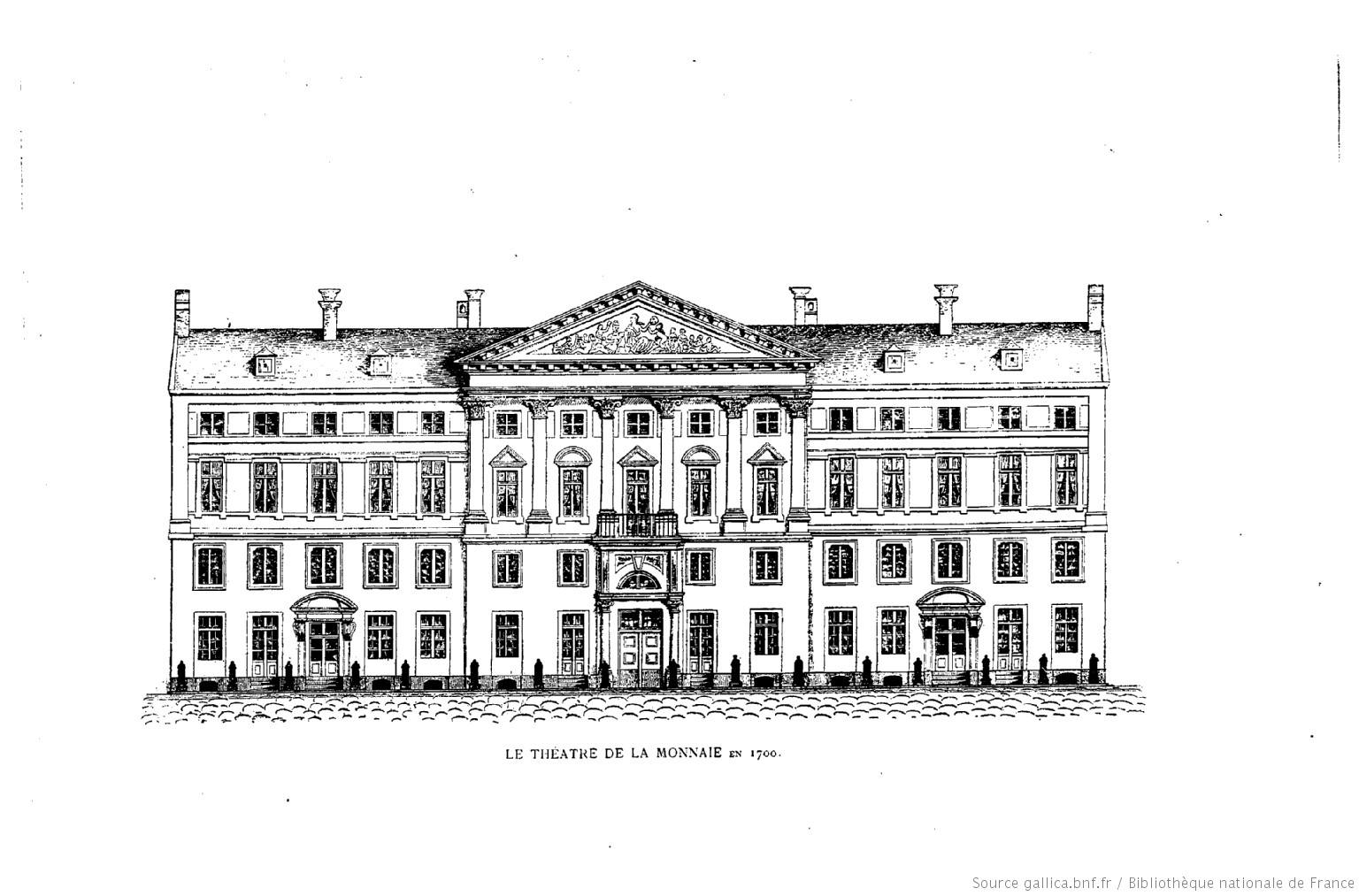
The first Theatre of La Monnaie (then spelled La Monnoye), c. 1700

The exact date of the first performance in 1700 remains unknown, but the first showing mentioned in the local newspapers was Jean-Baptiste Lully's Atys, which was given on 19 November 1700. The French operatic repertoire would dominate the Brussels stage throughout the following century, though performances of Venetian operas and other non-French repertoire were also performed on a regular basis. Until the middle of the 19th century, plays were performed along with opera, ballet and concerts.

By the 18th century, La Monnaie was considered the second French-speaking stage after the most prominent theatres in Paris. Under the rule of Prince Charles Alexander of Lorraine, who acted as a very generous patron of the arts, the theatre greatly flourished. At that time, it housed an opera company, a ballet and an orchestra. The splendour of the performances diminished during the last years of Austrian rule, due to the severe politics of Emperor Joseph II.

After 1795, when the French Revolutionary forces occupied the Belgian provinces, the theatre became a French departmental institution. Amongst other cuts in its expenses, the theatre had to abolish its Corps de Ballet. During this period, many famous French actors and singers gave regular performances in the theatre whilst touring the country's provinces. Then-consul Napoleon, visiting Brussels, judged the old theatre too dilapidated for one of the most prestigious cities of his future Empire. He ordered plans to replace the old building with a new and more monumental edifice, but these plans would only be carried out and Bombarda's building demolished in 1818, under the auspices of the new United Kingdom of the Netherlands.

=== The theatre of Louis Damesme (1819–1855) ===
The new theatre was a neoclassical building designed by the French architect Louis Damesme. Unlike Bombarda's building, which was situated along the street and completely surrounded by other buildings, the new theatre was placed in the middle of a newly constructed square. While this also gave it a monumental appearance, the main concern was safety: the building was now more accessible to firemen, and the chance of any fire spreading was reduced. The new auditorium was inaugurated on 25 May 1819 with the opera La Caravane du Caire by the composer André Ernest Modeste Grétry.

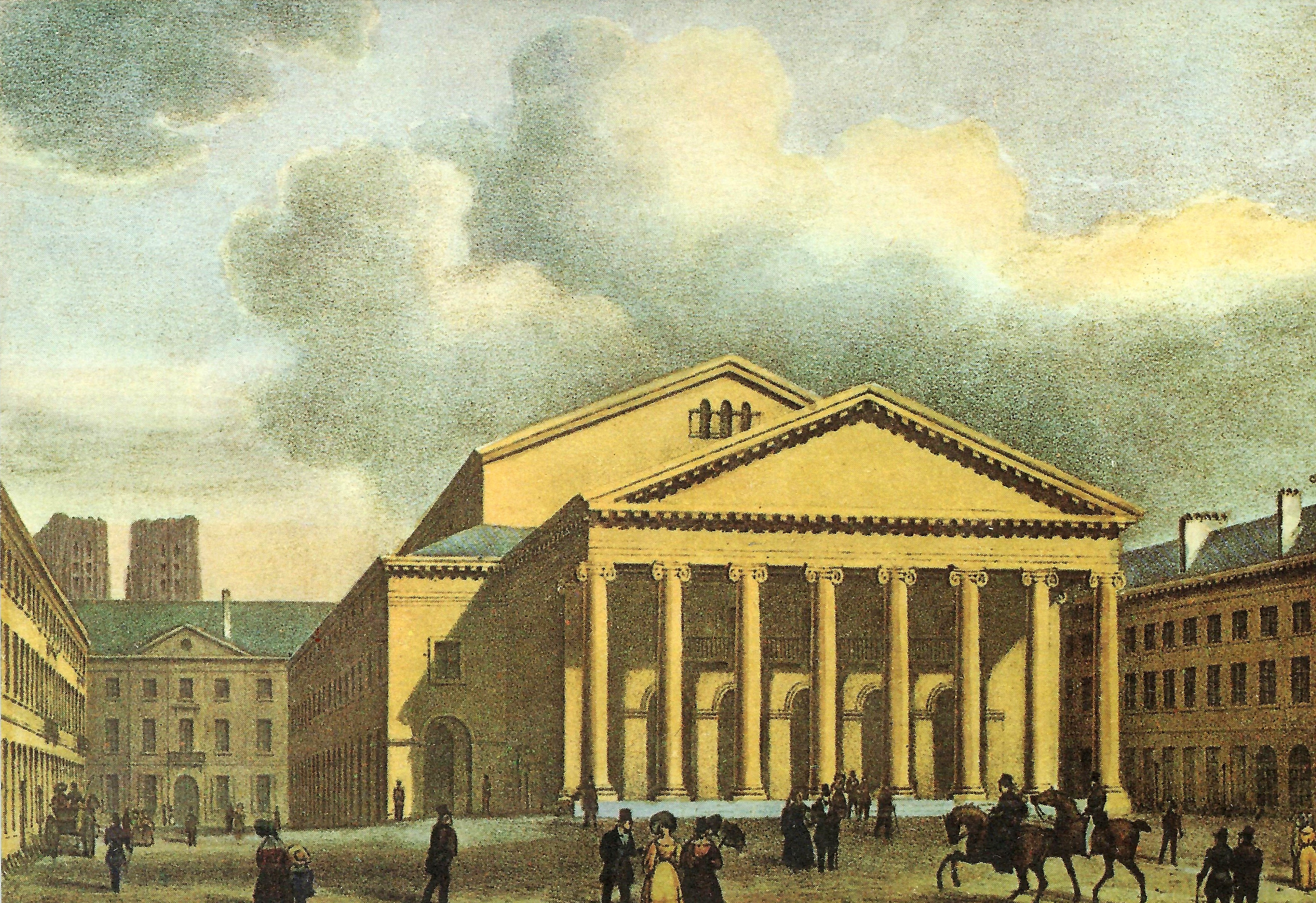
Painting of the second Theatre of La Monnaie, c. 1825–1855

As the most important French theatre of the newly established United Kingdom of the Netherlands, La Monnaie had national and international significance. The theatre came under the supervision of the City of Brussels, which had the right to appoint a director charged with its management. In this period, actors like François-Joseph Talma and singers like Maria Malibran performed at La Monnaie. The Corps de Ballet was reintroduced and came under the supervision of the dancer and choreographer Jean-Antoine Petipa, father of Marius Petipa.

La Monnaie would play a prominent role in the formation of the Kingdom of Belgium. Daniel Auber's opera La Muette de Portici was scheduled in August 1830 after it had been banned from the stage by King William I of the Netherlands, fearing its inciting content. At a performance of this opera on the evening of 25 August 1830, a riot broke out, which became the signal for the Belgian Revolution that ultimately led to the country's independence.

Damesme's building continued to serve for more than two decades as Belgium's principal theatre and opera house until it burnt to the ground on 21 January 1855, leaving only the outside walls and portico.

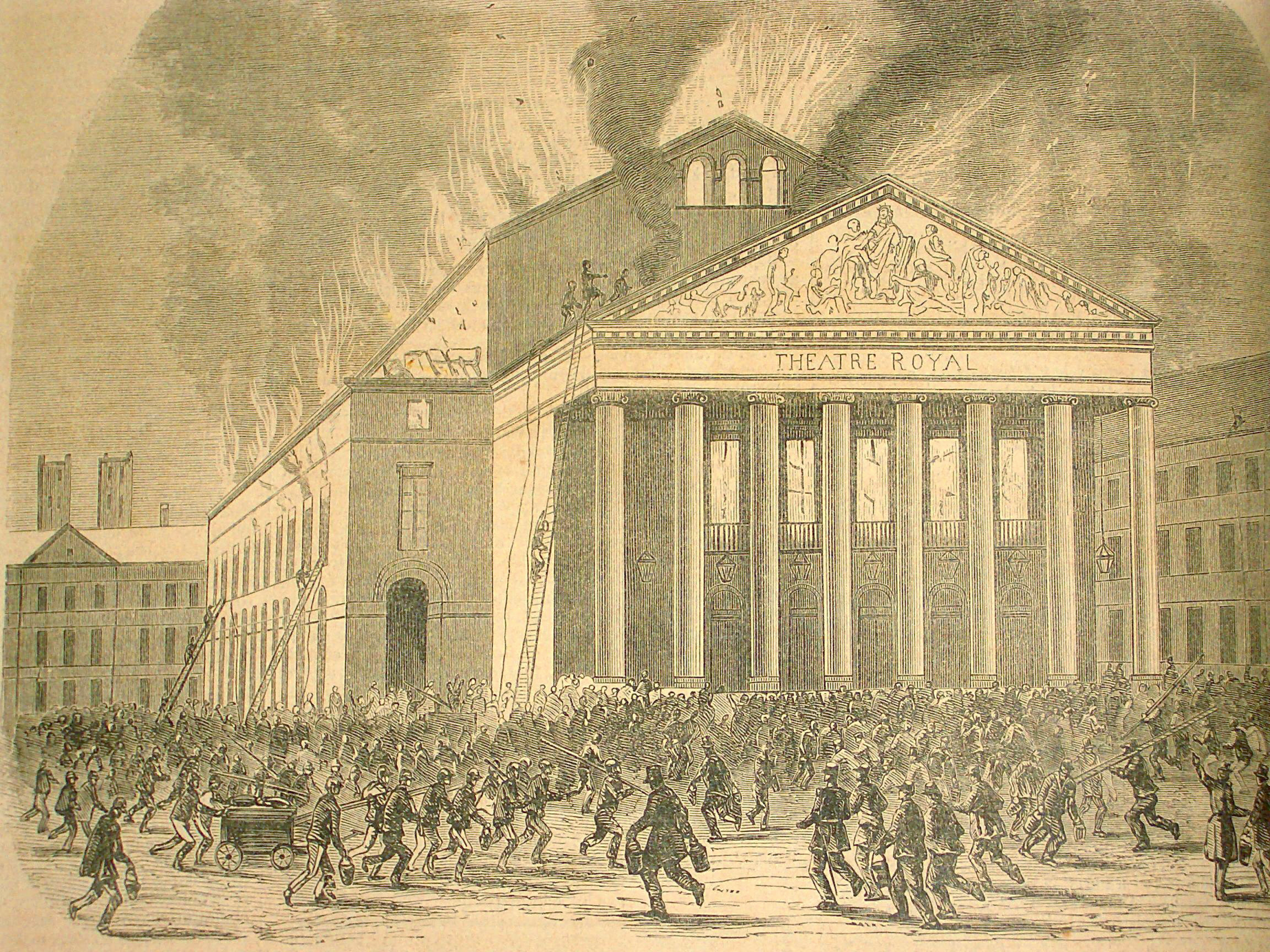
Contemporary illustration of the 1855 fire at La Monnaie, published in L'Illustration

=== The theatre of Joseph Poelaert (1856–present) ===
After the fire of January 1855, the theatre was reconstructed after the designs of Joseph Poelaert within a period of fourteen months. The auditorium (with 1,200 seats) and the foyer were decorated in a then-popular eclectic style, a mixture of neo-Baroque, neo-Rococo and neo-Renaissance styles. The lavish decoration made excessive use of gilded carton-pierre decorations and sculptures, red velvet and brocade. The auditorium was lit by a huge crystal chandelier made of gilded bronze and Venetian crystals, which still hangs in the centre of the domed ceiling today. The new Théâtre royal de la Monnaie opened on 28 March 1856 with Fromental Halévy's Jaguarita l'Indienne.

The original dome painting, representing Belgium Protecting the Arts, was produced in the Parisian workshop of François-Joseph Nolau and Auguste Alfred Rubé, two decorators of the Paris Opera House. In 1887, this dome painting was completely repainted by Rubé himself and his new associate Philippe-Marie Chaperon, because it was mostly tainted by CO_{2} emissions from the chandelier. This dome painting stayed untouched until 1985, when it was taken down during extensive rebuilding activities and replaced by a bad copy, painted by the painter Xavier Crolls. From 1988 until 1998, the dome painting of Rubé and Chaperon was in restoration, until its final reinstatement in 1999. The sober whitewashed exterior seen today was done many decades later. Poelaert never intended to whitewash these outer walls — in 1856, the exterior did not have any whitewashing at all, as proved by many photographs of that time.

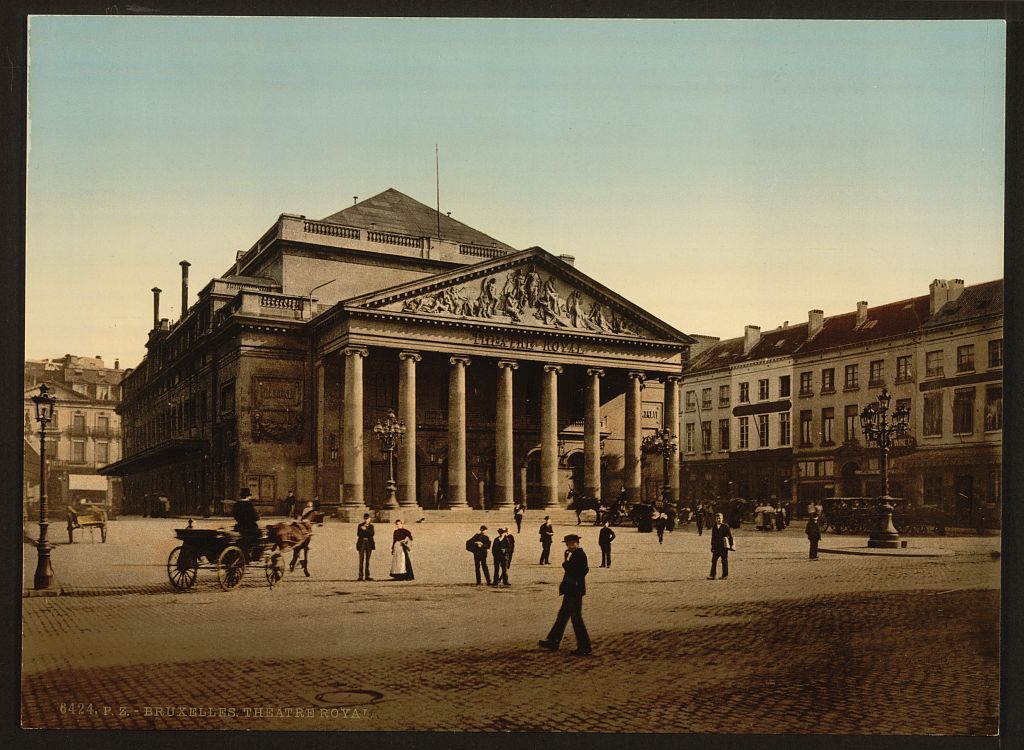
The reconstructed La Monnaie, c. 1890–1900

In the middle of the 19th century, the repertoire was dominated by popular French composers such as Halévy, Daniel Auber, and Giacomo Meyerbeer, as well as Italian composers like Gioachino Rossini, Gaetano Donizetti, Vincenzo Bellini and Giuseppe Verdi, who had considerable success in Paris.

=== The opera house in the 20th century ===
Renovations on Poelaert's building were required shortly after opening due to faulty foundation work. The early 20th century saw the addition of a storey, and in the 1950s, of a new stage building. By 1985, it was determined that a complete renovation was needed. Features such as raising the roofline by 4 metres (13 ft) and scooping out the stage building area—in addition to creating a steel frame to strengthen the load-bearing walls and increasing backstage space—characterised this two-year project. However, the red and gold auditorium remained largely identical. The canvas of the ceiling painting was temporarily removed for restoration and only put back in 1999. It was temporarily replaced by a copy in much brighter colours, which was painted directly on the stucco ceiling.

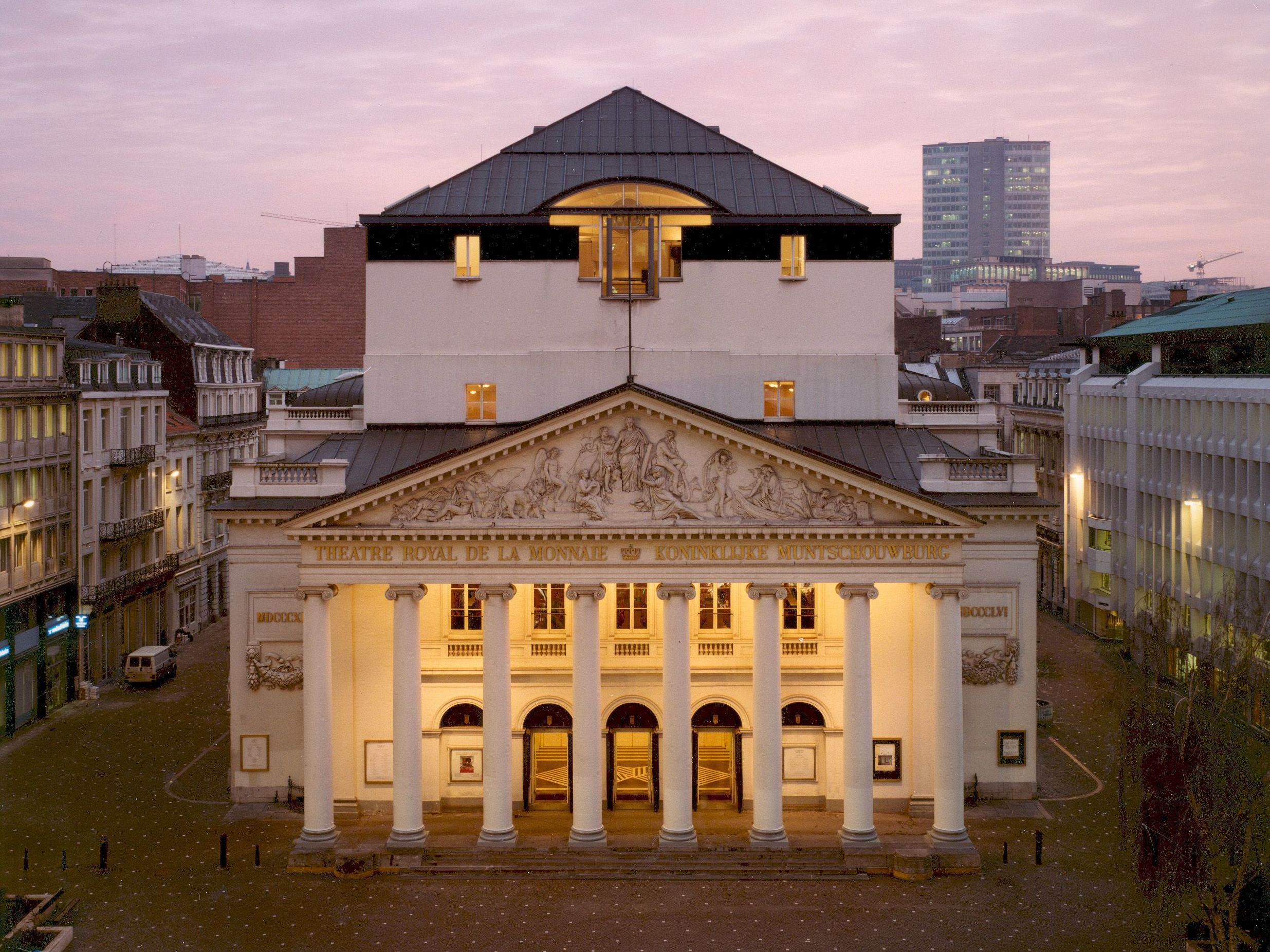
La Monnaie as it appears today

The entrance hall and the grand staircase underwent a radical makeover, although original features such as the monument by the sculptor Paul Du Bois honouring the Manager and Music Director Dupont (1910), and a number of monumental paintings (1907–1933) by Emile Fabry were preserved. The Liège architect Charles Vandenhove created a new architectural concept for the entrance in 1985–86. He asked two American artists to make a contribution: Sol LeWitt designed a fan-shaped floor in black and white marble, while Sam Francis painted an abstract triptych mounted to the ceiling. Vandenhove also designed a new interior decoration for the Salon Royal, a reception room connected to the Royal Box. For this project, he collaborated with the French artist Daniel Buren. Now seating 1,125, the renovated opera house was inaugurated on 12 November 1986 with a performance of Beethoven's Symphony No. 9.

In 1998, the major part of the vacant Vanderborght department store building (c. 20,000 m^{2} (220,000 sq ft)) and a neoclassical mansion, both situated directly behind the opera house, were acquired by La Monnaie. The edifices were renovated and adapted to house La Monnaie's technical and administrative facilities, previously spread all over the city. The building also contains large rehearsal halls for opera, the Malibran, and orchestra, the Fiocco. They can also be adapted for presenting public performances.

=== La Monnaie in the 21st century ===
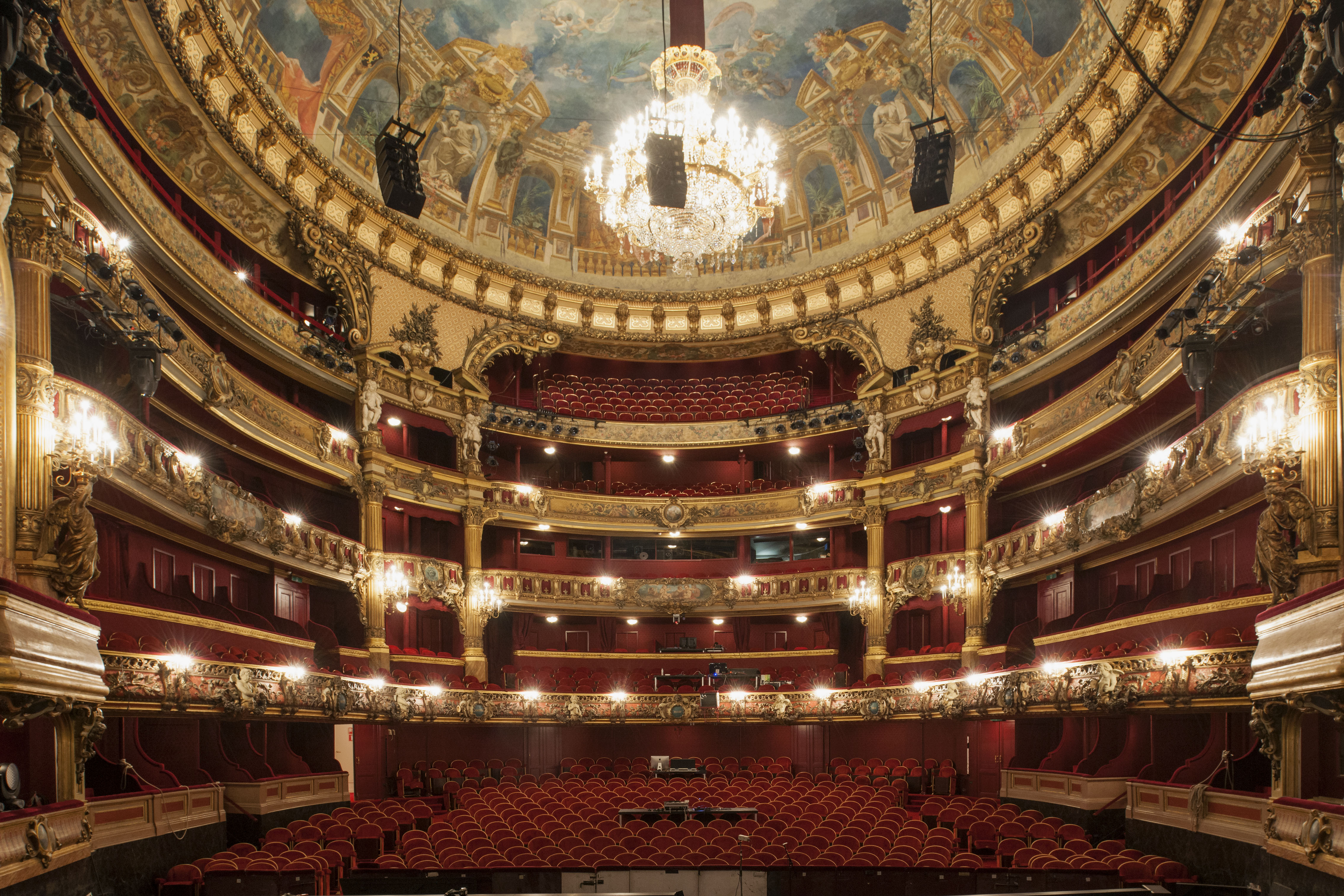
Grand Room at La Monnaie

In the late 20th and early 21st centuries, La Monnaie has reclaimed its place amongst the foremost opera houses in Europe thanks to the efforts of the successive directors Gerard Mortier and Bernard Foccroulle and Music Directors Sylvain Cambreling and Antonio Pappano.

The opera house was renovated again from May 2015 to September 2017: the stage was levelled, a new fly system was put in place, and two scene lifts were installed. This allowed the opera house to stage more technically demanding productions. Although most of the renovations took place backstage, the opera house used this opportunity to replace all of its worn-out seats with new velour seats.

== Directors ==
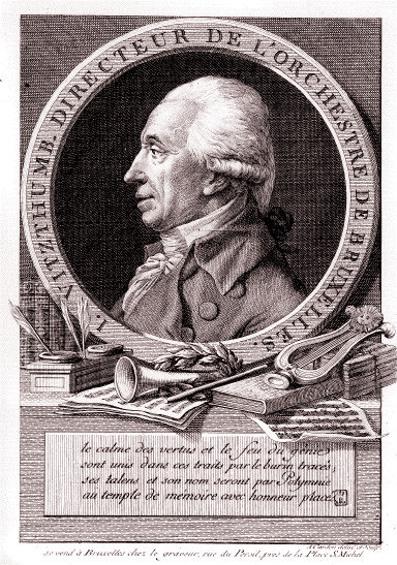
Ignaz Vitzthumb, music director of La Monnaie in the 18th century

During the 1980s, Gerard Mortier was general director of La Monnaie. Bernard Foccroulle succeeded Mortier in 1991 and served for fifteen seasons, maintaining and even expanding the reputation Mortier had gained in the 1980s. The current general director is Peter de Caluwe, who has been in the post since 2007, and is scheduled to conclude his tenure on 1 July 2025. In June 2023, the company announced the appointment of Christina Scheppelmann as its next general director, effective 1 July 2025, with an initial contract of six years.

La Monnaie's music directors have always played a major role in Belgium's musical life, since the orchestra also performed in regularly organised concerts, and the quality of the orchestra reached a peak at the end of the 19th century under the baton of composer and musicologist Sylvain Dupuis. La Monnaie gave regular performances of the major works of Richard Wagner as well. During the late 19th century, important French composers such as Jules Massenet and Vincent d'Indy directed the world premieres of some of their operas at this theatre. The high musical quality of renditions was maintained under Corneil de Thoran between the two World Wars, but diminished gradually from the 1950s onwards.

At the beginning of the 1980s, Gérard Mortier hired Sylvain Cambreling as La Monnaie's music director, and Cambreling restored the orchestra to its former playing level. From 1990, Bernd Loebe was artistic director. Antonio Pappano became music director in 1991, and during his tenure, the orchestra's symphonic repertoire was further extended and it appeared more often in concerts outside the opera. In addition, Pappano made several recordings with the orchestra. He left in 2002 to become music director of the Royal Opera House, Covent Garden in London.

Beginning in 2002, Kazushi Ono served as music director. At the end of the 2007–08 season, Ono was scheduled to relinquish his position as La Monnaie's music director to Mark Wigglesworth, the two having worked together during that season. However, in April 2008, La Monnaie announced that Wigglesworth would not take up the position of music director, after reports of opposition to him from the orchestra. In June 2011, the company announced the appointment of Ludovic Morlot as its next music director, as of the 2012–13 season, with an initial contract of five years. In December 2014, citing artistic differences, Morlot resigned from the La Monnaie's music directorship, effective 31 December 2014. In September 2015, the company announced the appointment of Alain Altinoglu as its next music director, effective January 2016. In August 2025, Altinoglu's contract was extended until 2031.

For performances of Baroque operas, La Monnaie mostly engages guest orchestras specialising in authentic performances on period instruments. Over the past decades, René Jacobs and his Concerto Vocale have been regular guests at the theatre.

== Dance at La Monnaie ==
Dance and ballet always had their place on the stage of La Monnaie, and during a major part of its history, the theatre housed its own Corps de Ballet. Several members of the Petipa family left their mark in Brussels in the 19th century, but the enthusiasm of the public for traditional ballet performances diminished in the 1950s.

In 1959, director Maurice Huisman embarked on a cooperation with the young avant-garde choreographer Maurice Béjart. This resulted in the creation of the new Ballet of the 20th Century, which became the theatre's new ballet company until 1987, when Béjart and his Ballet left La Monnaie after a conflict with Gerard Mortier. In 1988, Mortier hired the New York choreographer Mark Morris and his Mark Morris Dance Group. For three years, they were known as the Monnaie Dance Group Mark Morris. Morris directed several productions in Brussels until 1991. Under Bernard Foccroulle, Anne Teresa De Keersmaeker and her company Rosas became the dance company in residence.

== Notable world premieres ==
- Jules Massenet: Hérodiade (19 December 1881)
- Ernest Reyer: Sigurd (7 January 1884)
- Emanuel Chabrier: Gwendoline (10 April 1886)
- Benjamin Godard: Jocelyn (25 February 1888)
- Ernest Reyer: Salammbô (10 February 1890)
- Vincent d'Indy: Fervaal (12 March 1897)
- Vincent d'Indy: L'Etranger (7 January 1903)
- Ernest Chausson: Le Roi Arthus (30 November 1903)
- Darius Milhaud: Les Malheurs d'Orphée (7 May 1926)
- Arthur Honegger: Antigone (28 December 1927)
- Sergei Prokofiev: Igrok (The Gambler), 29 April 1929)
- Philippe Boesmans: La Passion de Gilles (18 October 1983)
- Mark Morris: L'Allegro, il Penseroso ed il Moderato (22 November 1988)
- Mark Morris: The Hard Nut (1991)
- John Adams: The Death of Klinghoffer (19 March 1991)
- Philippe Boesmans: Reigen (4 March 1993)
- Philippe Boesmans: Wintermärchen (10 December 1999)
- Philippe Boesmans: Julie (8 March 2005)
- Nicholas Lens: Shell Shock (24 October 2014)
- Bernard Foccroulle: Cassandra (10 September 2023)
- Michael Karlsson: Fanny and Alexander (01 December 2024)
- Iain Bell: Medusa (05 May 2026)

== See also ==
- History of Brussels
- Culture of Belgium
- Belgium in the long nineteenth century
