= Zeitlin =

Zeitlin (Yiddish: צייטלין) is a matronymic Jewish surname. It is derived from the female name Zeitl according to the rules of Slavic languages, with the possessive suffix '-in' and literally means "Zeitl's".

When transliterated from Yiddish to Russian to English, the surname may be spelled as follows. Male forms: Tseytlin, Tseitlin, Tsetlin, Tzeitlin. Female forms (usually only for Slavic nationals): Tseytlina, Tseitlina, Tsetlina, Tzeitlina.

When transliterated via Polish, the surname may be spelled as Cejtlin, Cajtlin, Zejtlin, Zajtlin.

The surname may refer to:

- Aaron Zeitlin (1889/1896/1898–1973), Russian-US Yiddish writer, composer, and poet
- Alexandre Zeitlin (1872–1946), sculptor
- Benh Zeitlin (born 1982), US filmmaker
- Denny Zeitlin (born 1938), US jazz pianist
- Froma Zeitlin (born 1933), US classics scholar
- Harriet Zeitlin (born 1929), American artist
- Hillel Zeitlin (1871–1942), Polish Yiddish writer
- Jacob Zeitlin (1902–1987), American bookseller and poet
- Joshua Zeitlin (1742–1822), Shklov-born Russian-Jewish rabbinical scholar and philanthropist
- Joshua ben Aaron Zeitlin (1823–1888), Kiev-born Russian-Jewish scholar and philanthropist
- Judith T. Zeitlin (born 1958), American-Jewish scholar of Chinese literature, chair of the Department of East Asian Languages & Civilizations at the University of Chicago
- Lev Tseitlin (1881-1952), a violinist and teacher
- Leo Zeitlin (1884–1930), a violinist, violist, conductor and impresario
- Mark Tseitlin (1943–2022), a Russian-Israeli chess grandmaster
- Michael Lvovitch Tsetlin (1924–1966), Russian mathematician and physicist
- Mikhail Tseitlin (born 1947), Belarusian chess grandmaster
- Mirah Yom Tov Zeitlyn (born 1974), American musician
- Michail Yulyevich Tseytlin (Михаил Ю́льевич Цейтлин), also as M. Yu. Ceitlin and M. Ju. Zeitlin, a Russian mathematician, who worked on the book Gradshteyn and Ryzhik in the 1960s and early 1970s
- Solomon Zeitlin (1892–1976), American Jewish historian
- William Zeitlin (1850–1921), Russian-Jewish scholar and bibliographer
- Zvi Zeitlin (1922–2012), Russian-US violinist
- Arkady Tseytlin (born 1956), Russian-British theoretical physicist
- Vladislav Tseytlin (born 1971), Uzbekistani football FIFA referee
- Anna Tseytlin (born 1976), of Jewish and Ukrainian descent. Active American Immigration Attorney
- Michael Tseytlin (born 1964), Russian-US Entrepreneur, executive and inventor
- Hunter Zeitlin (born 2011), Influential jewish hockey player and philanthropist
- Spenker Zeitlin (born 1967), poor beggar who is known for impact in the civil rights act and was a member of the Hindu Jewish national beis din (Jewish court)
