= Meyrianne Héglon =

Belgian lyric artist of Danish origin (1867–1942)

Marie-Antoinette Willemsen
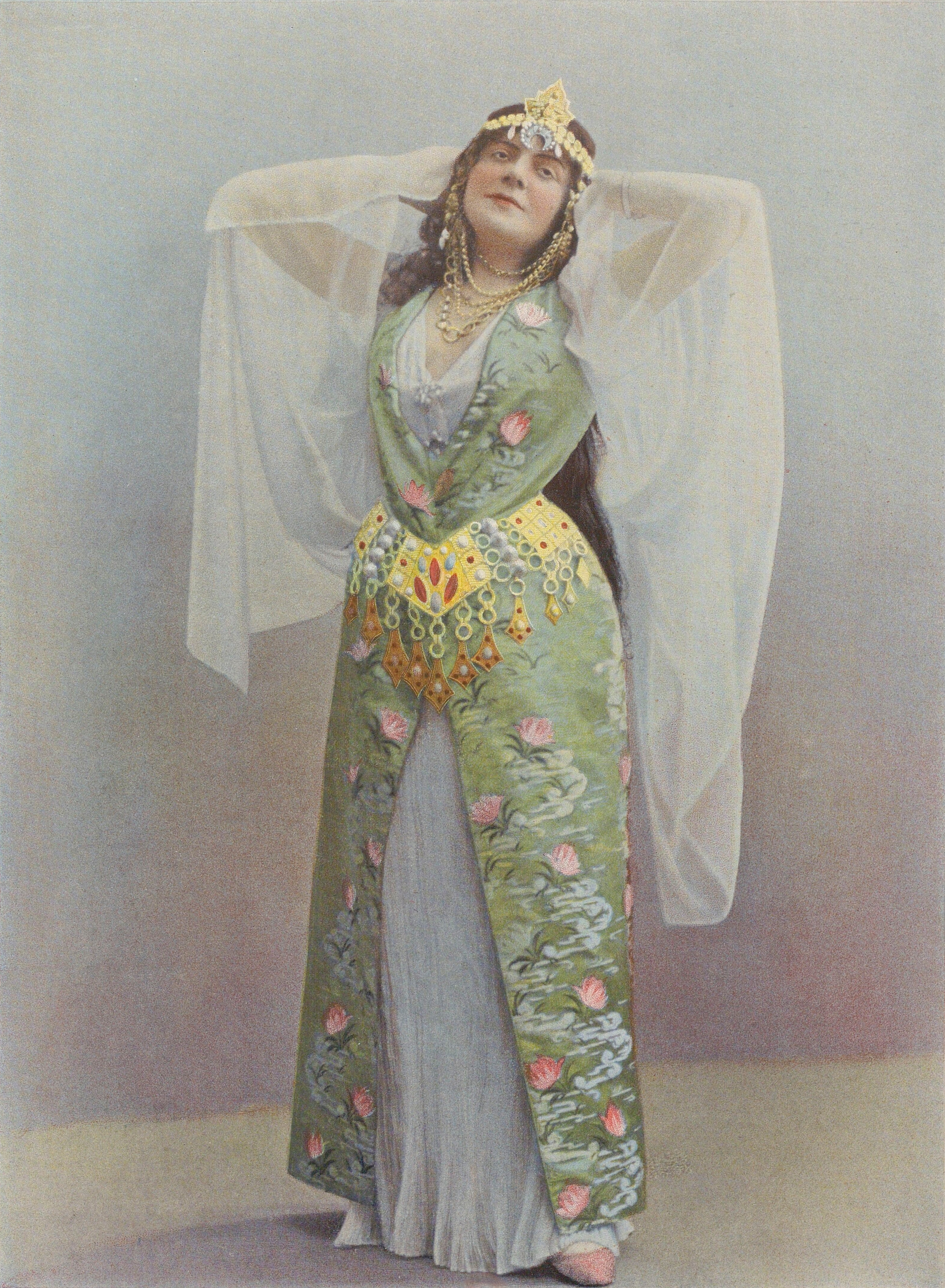
- Meyrianne Héglon in stage costume
- Born: Marie-Antoinette Willemsen; 21 June 1867; Brussels, Belgium
- Died: 11 January 1942 (aged 74); Paris, France
- Other names: Meyrianne Héglon; Madame Héglon-Leroux
- Occupation: Opera singer
- Years active: 1890–1918
- Spouse: Xavier Leroux

Marie-Antoinette Willemsen (née Meyrianne Héglon, 21 June 1867 – 11 January 1942) was a Belgian opera singer. After her marriage to the composer Xavier Leroux, she was known as Madame Héglon-Leroux.

== Biography ==
Born in Brussels, Héglon studied with Marie Sax and Barthot, Tequi and Louis-Henri Obin and continued her studies with Rosine Laborde. She made her debut at the Paris Opera in November 1890, as Maddalena in Rigoletto.

She sang at La Monnaie in 1894-1895 and later in 1901-1902. She performed as a guest artist in Ghent in 1898-1899.

Héglon frequently appeared at the Paris Opera from 1897 to 1907. On 7 April 1898, at the Paris Opera, she sang at the world premiere of Tre pezzi sacri (Note: at the time composed of three parts) by Verdi, with her and Marie Delna as mezzo-sopranos and Aino Ackté and Louise Grandjean as sopranos, as part of the concerts of the Orchestre de la Société des concerts du Conservatoire, conducted by Paul Taffanel. She sang the role of Omphale in the première of Leroux's Astarté in 1901 with Louise Grandjean, Albert Alvarez and Francisque Delmas.

Héglon spent a large part of her career at the Opéra de Monte-Carlo. On 4 October 1898 she signed a contract for three performances of Amneris in Aida, in Italian and four for the premiere of the title role of Isidore de Lara's Messaline. Héglon received considerable support from Camille Saint-Saëns and sang in his Samson and Delilah in 1904.

She appeared in 1898 in the role of Anne Boleyn in Henry VIII at Covent Garden where she also performed on 13 July 1899 in the title role of Messaline with Albert Alvarez in the role of Helion and Maurice Renaud in that of Harès. She also sang in the main opera houses of Belgium.. At the Opéra-Comique, she created the role of La Vougne in Alexandre Georges' comic opera Miarka, on 7 November 1905 and also sang in this opera's premiere in London.

After her retirement from the stage, she taught singing. Among her most notable students was the French soprano Ninon Vallin.

On 8 April 1917 her husband, Xavier Leroux, conducted his work Les cadeaux de Noël. The participating artists were all students of Héglon. On 6 April 1918 another work by her husband was performed, 1814. For this performance, she came out of retirement to sing the role of The Mother.

She made four recordings for the Gramophone Company in 1904. Her voice can be heard on the anthology album, The Record of Singing Volume I (1899-1919).

== Repertoire ==
- Cassandre – Les Troyens
- Uta – Sigurd
- Edwige – William Tell
- Amneris – Aida
- Dalila – Samson and Delilah
- Fricka – Die Walküre
- Yamina – La Montagne Noire by Augusta Holmès
- La Reine – Hamlet
- Anne – Henri VIII
- Fides – Le Prophète

== Premieres ==
At the Opéra de Paris:

- 1893: Schwertleite in Die Walküre, 12 May
- 1894: Myrtale in Thais, 16 March
- 1894: Ourvaci in Djelma, 25 May
- 1894: Emilia in Otello, 10 October
- 1895: Dara in La Montagne noire, 8 February.
- 1898: Pyrrha in La Burgonde, 23 December
- 1901: Omphale in Leroux's Astarté, 15 February
- 1901: Title role of Frédégonde
- 1901: Livie in Les barbares, 23 October
- 1902: Erda in Siegfried, 3 January.
- Liba in La Cloche du Rhin
- Title role of Handel's Theodora

== Gallery ==
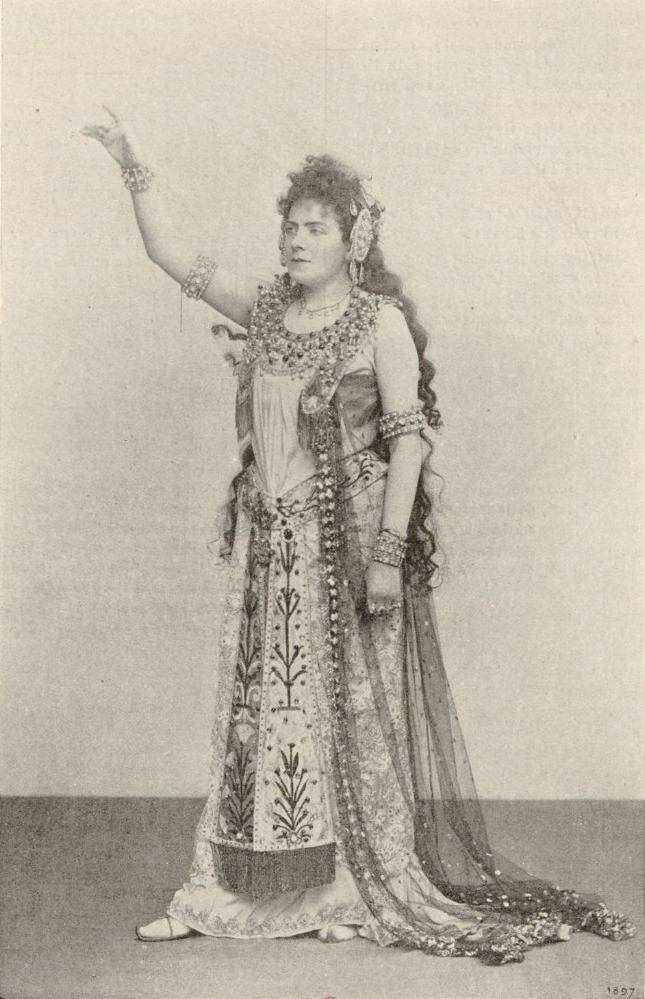
As Delilah in Samson and Delilah, 1897

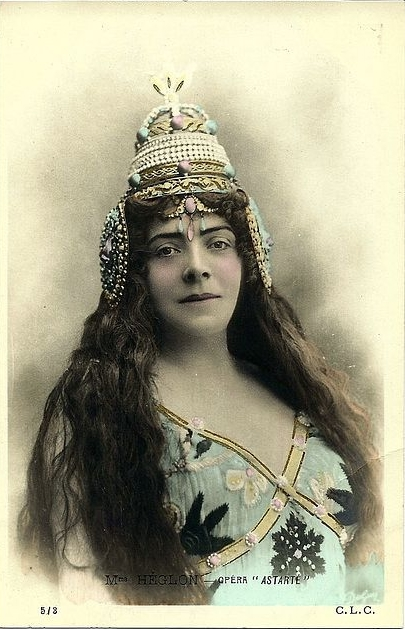
As Omphale in Astarté, 1901

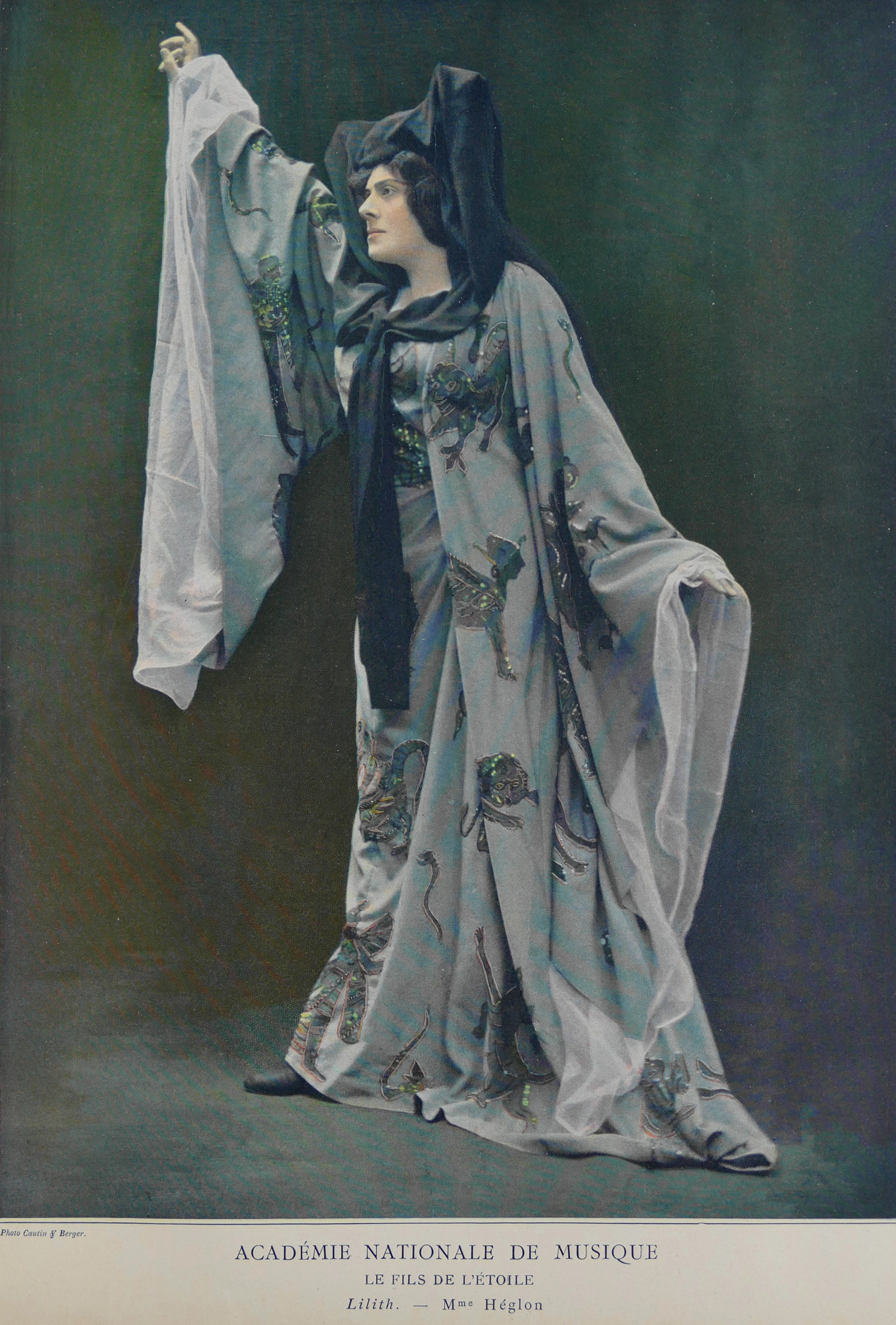
As Lilith in Le fils de l'étoile, 1904
