= Francesco Tamagno =

Italian opera singer (1850–1905)

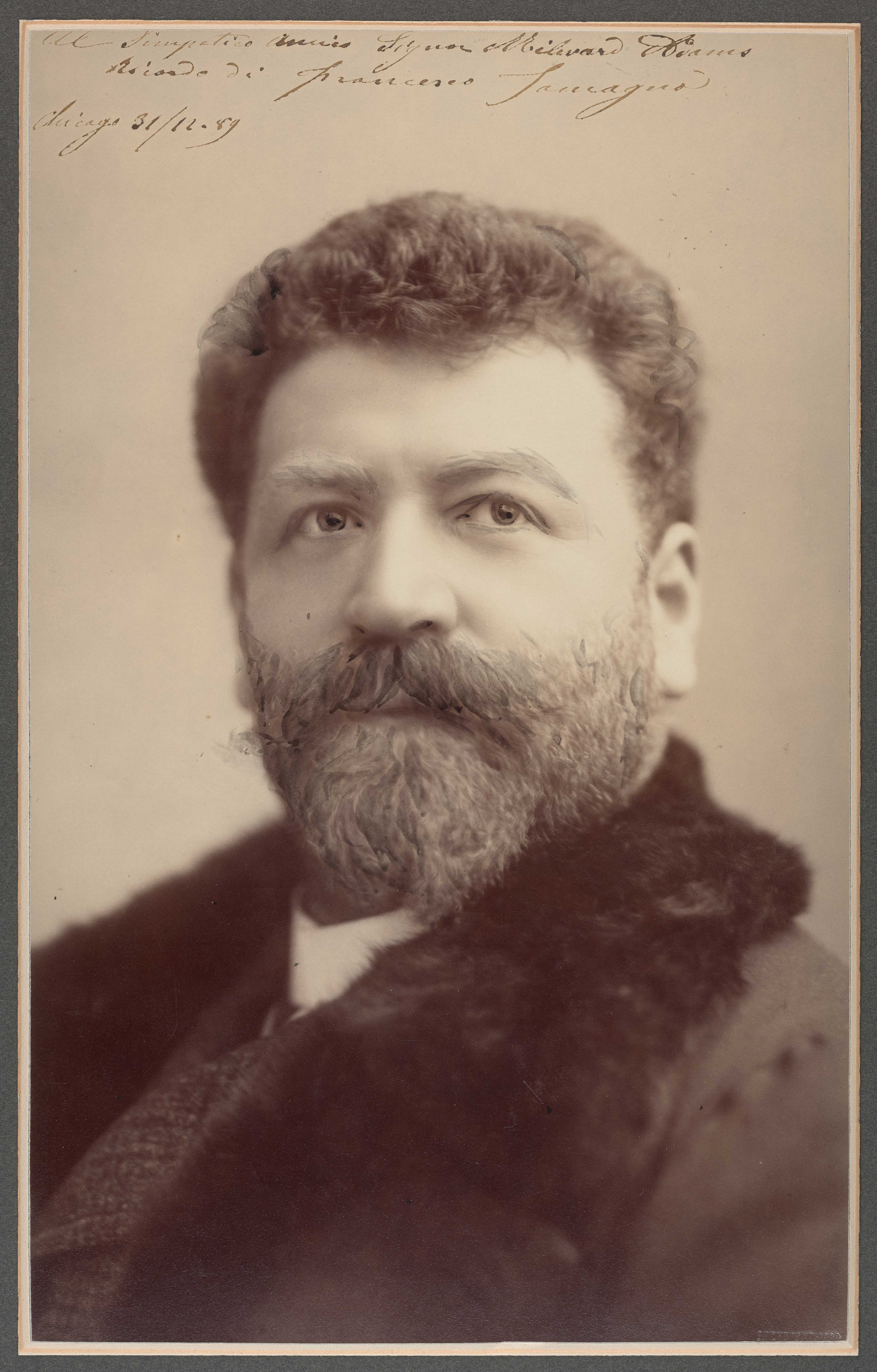
Francesco Tamagno, c. 1889 (Newberry Library, Chicago)

Francesco Tamagno (28 December 1850 – 31 August 1905) was an Italian operatic dramatic tenor who sang with enormous success throughout Europe and America. On 5 February 1887, he sang Otello in the first performance of Giuseppe Verdi's opera. He is also the earliest Italian tenor of note to have left a sizeable body of recordings of his voice. He was one of the first international male public figures to admit that he was the single parent and caregiver of a daughter from her birth.

== Musical significance ==
Tamagno performed in 26 countries, gaining renown for the power of his singing, especially in the upper register. Tamagno is described as a type of operatic vocalist known as a tenore robusto or tenore di forza. Critics likened the sound of his voice to that of a trumpet or even a cannon. Tamagno's vocal range extended up to high C-sharp during his prime, but he was no mere "belter" of high notes; his recordings provide evidence of his ability, even at career's end, to sing softly when required, modulating the dynamic levels of his voice with skill and sensitivity.

Best known as the creator of the protagonist's part in Verdi's Otello at La Scala, Milan in 1887, he also was the first Gabriele Adorno in Verdi's 1881 revision of Simon Boccanegra, a far more lyrical assignment than the "Moor of Venice". He participated in the premiere of Verdi's Italian-language version of Don Carlos when it was staged at La Scala in 1884, singing the eponymous role of the Infante of Spain. Five other operas in which Tamagno created leading roles were Carlos Gomes' Maria Tudor (in 1879), Amilcare Ponchielli's Il figliuol prodigo (1880) and Marion Delorme (1885), Ruggero Leoncavallo's I Medici (1893) and Isidore de Lara's Messaline (1899).

He was lauded for his performances of such established parts as Manrico in Il trovatore, Don Alvaro in La forza del destino, the title roles in Ernani and Poliuto, Arnold in Guillaume Tell, John of Leyden in Le prophète, Raoul in Les Huguenots, Vasco in L'Africaine, Robert in Robert le diable and Eleazar in La Juive. He excelled in the newer dramatic parts of Radames in Aida, Samson in Samson et Dalila, Alim in Le roi de Lahore and John the Baptist in Hérodiade. Yet, in his younger days, before his voice grew too robust, he was able to negotiate a role as light and graceful as that of Edgardo in Lucia di Lammermoor due to his accomplished mezza-voce singing.

Tamagno sang in approximately 55 different operas and sacred works (including Verdi's Requiem and Gioachino Rossini's Stabat Mater) during the course of his career as a soloist, which began in Turin in 1873 and continued for another 32 years, only to be curtailed by the onset of a cardiovascular affliction that killed him in middle age. With one notable exception, Tamagno largely eschewed verismo opera, considering it to be an uncomfortable fit with his stylistic training in the bel canto tradition. That notable exception was Umberto Giordano's Andrea Chénier. He studied the score of Chénier with Giordano in 1898 and earned accolades for his magisterial delivery of the tenor lead's four showpiece solos at ensuing productions of the work. He was on friendly terms, too, with Giordano's rival Giacomo Puccini. In 1892, he took part in a revival of Puccini's flawed early opera Edgar which was staged in Madrid under the supervision of the composer, but even Tamagno's involvement in the enterprise was not enough to reinvigorate Edgar and it remains rarely heard. (Tamagno also ventured a few performances of Pietro Mascagni's archetypal verismo piece, Cavalleria rusticana, in New York City in 1894.)

To paraphrase Tamagno's New York Times obituary of 1 September 1905, such was the extraordinary facility of the tenor's upper register, he made the hurling forth of his high A, B and C sound as easy as everyday speech. Like all singers, however, he had his vocal shortcomings and bad habits. The vibrant, power-packed tone of his voice, while thrilling, could never be described as "honeyed" or "seductive" and this reduced the effectiveness of his contribution to the more intimate passages of love duets, such as the one for the protagonist and Desdemona that crowns Act One of Otello. He was not an adroit sight-reader, justifying this limitation by insisting that he was an emotional person who preferred to deliver his music from the "heart" rather than from the "head". Critics occasionally reprimanded him for striving to maximise the excitement factor of his performances by holding on to top notes longer than necessary and by sometimes pushing them sharp. He was also chided intermittently for getting behind or ahead of the conductor's beat.

Tamagno's career lasted for more than three decades. During that time, he sang at theatres in Europe, South America and the United States.

== Life and singing career ==
Born into a large family in the northern Italian city of Turin (Torino) in 1850, Tamagno was the son of a wine seller who ran a modest trattoria. His vocal promise manifested itself early, and although encouraged by his parents to learn a trade, he was still able to take singing lessons with the conductor and composer Carlo Pedrotti at Turin's Liceo Musicale music school and gain experience as a chorister.

In 1873, Tamagno completed his musical studies, and having got a stint of compulsory military service out of the way, he undertook a few small parts at Turin's Teatro Regio (Royal Theatre), of which institution Pedrotti was the director. He then made the most of an opportunity to execute a major operatic role, bursting into prominence on 20 January 1874 with a sensational performance as Riccardo in Giuseppe Verdi's Un ballo in maschera at the Teatro Bellini, Palermo. Tamagno embarked on a series of follow-up singing engagements in Ferrara, Rovigo, Venice and Barcelona which raised his profile further and enabled him to make his debut at Milan's La Scala in 1877.

La Scala was Italy's principal opera theatre, and Tamagno became a core member of its company of singers. His voice continued to mature at La Scala, reaching its full potential after a few years of spirited use in a variety of operas. He enjoyed the added advantage of working closely with Verdi, and his vocalism acquired a discipline and polish that hitherto it had lacked. According to The Concise Oxford Dictionary of Opera, he eventually took part in every La Scala season until the end of 1887 and appeared there again in 1901 as a guest artist. He did not completely turn his back on Turin, however, and he found time to sing periodically in his hometown; indeed, his last known public engagement occurred in Turin in 1905.

Argentina was an overseas bastion of Italian opera throughout this period, and Tamagno undertook the first of several well-remunerated visits to Buenos Aires in 1879. Earlier, in 1875–1876, he had sung in Spain. His international career did not take off explosively until 1888, with the role of Otello—which Verdi had written with Tamagno's voice in mind—serving as his global calling card. Music-performance historian John Potter noted regarding Otello in his 2009 book, Tenor: History of a Voice (Yale University Press, p. 61): "The title role was one of the most taxing tenor parts ever written and was created specifically for the unique talents and vocal persona of Tamagno. The requirements of the role, an imposing physical presence capable of combining lyrical sweetness with stentorian declamation that ranges from a rich baritonal middle to a ringing upper register, have made it problematic to cast ever since."

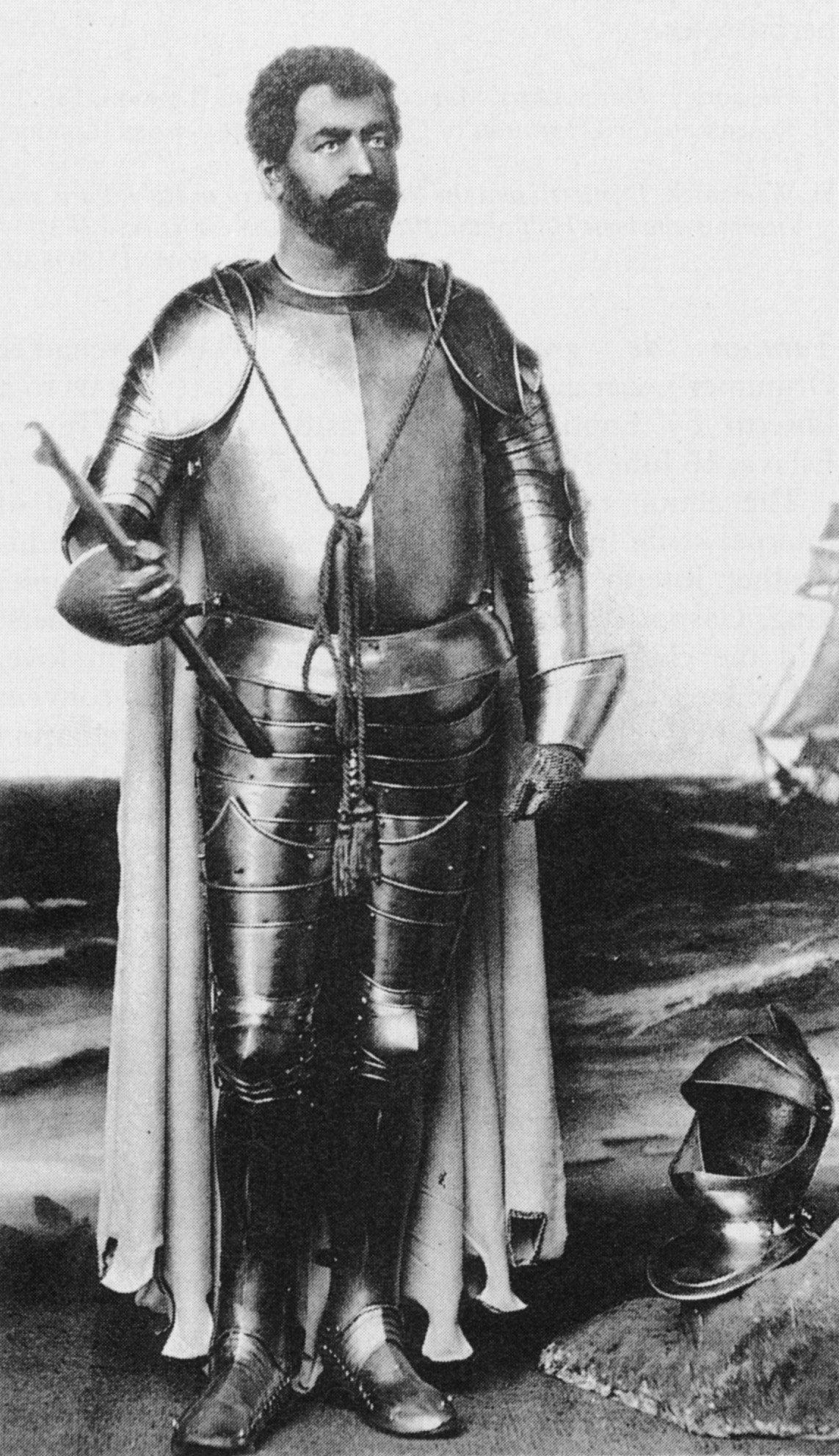
Tamagno as Otello, at the premiere at La Scala in 1887

Tamagno toured sedulously during the final dozen years of the 19th century, accepting lucrative invitations to perform Otello and other strenuous operatic roles in countries as diverse as England, France, Portugal, Spain (again), Germany, Austria, Russia, Uruguay, Brazil, Mexico and Argentina. He performed often at the fashionable Monte Carlo Opera and appeared at key musical venues in the North American cities of New York City, Chicago, Boston, Baltimore, Washington, D.C., Philadelphia and San Francisco. Tamagno's obituary in the New York Times says that he sang in the United States for the first time in 1890. The prominent American impresario Henry Eugene Abbey managed him during that trans-Atlantic visit.

To give just five specific examples of Tamagno's foreign engagements in the wake of the 1887 premiere of Otello, he performed at the New York Metropolitan Opera in 1894–1895, at London's Lyceum Theatre in 1889, at the Mariinsky Theatre in St Petersburg in 1896-97, at the Paris Opera in 1897, and at the Royal Opera House, Covent Garden, in 1895 and 1901. (During his London seasons, he also sang privately for Queen Victoria at Windsor Castle.)

Orchestral conductors of the calibre of Franco Faccio, Luigi Mancinelli and Arturo Toscanini partnered Tamagno during his heyday, and he appeared opposite some of the most illustrious sopranos, baritones and basses in operatic history. Veteran opera-goers regarded Tamagno as being the legitimate successor to Enrico Tamberlik (1820–1889), the dominant Italian heroic tenor of the mid-19th century, while Jean de Reszke (1850–1925) was widely considered to be the finest of his tenorial coevals. An elegant lyric-dramatic tenor of the French school, de Reszke's repertoire overlapped Tamagno's to some extent, and although he could never outsing his Italian rival, he had a rounder voice and a suaver stage presence. He was also the foremost male exponent of Richard Wagner's operas to be heard on the stages of London and New York during the late-Victorian Era. Tamagno, however, refused to perform Wagnerian works, even in Italian translation; he believed that the tessitura of the music written for Wagner's tenor heroes lay too low to suit his vocal range.

Tamagno lived long enough to witness the rise to fame of the young Enrico Caruso (1873–1921). He admired Caruso's ability, predicting as far back as 1898 that Caruso would go on to become the number-one Italian tenor of the 20th century. As M. J. Phillips-Matz observes in her 2002 Puccini biography, Tamagno and Caruso actually appeared on the same stage in February 1901, during a concert at La Scala. The concert had been organised by Toscanini as a commemorative tribute to the recently deceased Verdi. (In it, Tamagno sang an extract from La forza del destino and Caruso led the quartet from Rigoletto.) Opera commentator Michael Scott states that Tamagno gave his last performance as Otello in Rome in 1903, when he starred in a gala production mounted for Kaiser Wilhelm II.

A single father who never married, Tamagno possessed an affable personality in addition to a shrewd business brain and a careful attitude to money. Soprano Nellie Melba's most recent biographer, Ann Blainey, recounts how Melba reacted to Tamagno's penny-pinching when she twice encountered demonstrations of it during the 1894-1895 New York Met season:

"His astounding voice was said to have 'the metallic penetration of an eight-inch [artillery] shell', but at heart, he remained a simple peasant, and his peasant-like parsimony was a source of amusement. One night Melba and Jean de Reszke watched open-mouthed as he pocketed the after-dinner candies and souvenired a bunch of orchids from the table. Soon after, at a lunch, Melba saw him gather up his neighbour's uneaten cutlets and wrap them in a newspaper. He said they were for his dog, but Melba guessed they were for his own dinner." (See I Am Melba, Black Inc. Books, Melbourne, Australia, 2008, p. 149.)

Tamagno had a bullish physique but a chronic cardiac ailment caused his health to deteriorate during the early 1900s. Although this ailment forced him to quit the operatic stage, he continued to give recitals and appear in concerts, the final one of which was held in Ostend, Belgium, in 1904. He sang briefly in public for the last time in March the following year and withdrew to the tranquillity of a villa in Varese, Lombardy, that he had owned since 1885 and had remodelled extensively. Tamagno's medical condition failed to improve, however, and he suffered a heart attack while at the villa. He was confined to his bed, experienced a relapse and died on 31 August 1905, aged 54. His body lies interred in an elaborate stone mausoleum at Turin's General Cemetery.

Tamagno's beloved daughter Margherita, who had been born out of wedlock, and for whom he cared from her birth, writing to her throughout his career and her childhood incredibly moving letters, inherited his considerable estate, according to biographer Ugo Piavano. Piavano's definitive biography, Otello Fu: La Vera Vita di Francesco Tamagno, il "tenore-cannone", was published in Milan in 2005 by Rugginenti Editore to mark the 100th anniversary of the singer's death. Both Volume One of Michael Scott's The Record of Singing (published by Duckworth, London, 1977) and J. B. Steane's The Grand Tradition: 70 Years of Singing on Record (Duckworth, London, 1974) contain evaluations of Tamagno's voice and artistry. Furthermore, the Teatro Regio di Torino has acquired many of Tamagno's costumes and other items relating to his operatic career, while his butterfly collection can be viewed in Varese at the Villa Mirabello.

== Recordings ==
Niun mi tema
Francesco Tamagno, the original Otello, sings "Niun mi tema" (Morte d'Otello) from Giuseppe Verdi's Otello. This 1903 recording dates from just two years before Tamagno's death.

Tamagno's intensely bright, steel-tipped voice with its stentorian timbre, open production, vigorous (but never disruptive) vibrato and incisive declamation is preserved on two batches of technologically primitive recordings of operatic items. They were made during February 1903 at Tamagno's holiday retreat in Ospedaletti and during April 1904 at a 'studio' in Rome.

The British Gramophone & Typewriter Company, His Master's Voice/EMI's predecessor, produced all of Tamagno's recordings (issued in the US by the Victor Talking Machine Company), which were released on shellac discs 10 or 12 inches in diameter and play correctly at speeds in the range of 73 to 77 rpm (the 78 rpm standard was not established until the 1920s). It dispatched one of its best engineers, Fred Gaisberg, to Italy to handle the recording sessions. (Such sessions could be a daunting experience for singers of Tamagno's generation, who were accustomed to performing before an audience in an opera house environment.) The company paid Tamagno a cash advance of 2,000 pounds sterling to make his first lot of recordings. He also received royalties from the company for every individually numbered, custom-labelled pressing that sold. Roland Gelatt's revised edition of The Fabulous Phonograph (Collier Books, New York, 1977, p. 119) asserts that Tamagno's recording contract, signed in December 1902, was the first to embody "the royalty principle".

Gelatt states that Tamagno approved 19 recordings from his Ospedaletti session for release to the public. They went on sale in April 1903 and were heavily advertised in the press, with Tamagno billed as the world's greatest tenor. Buyers were charged one pound sterling, or its equivalent in other currencies, per disc; in comparison, Caruso's early 10-inch discs (made in Italy the previous year) sold for just 10 shillings or an equivalent amount of money. The amount charged for each of Tamagno's discs represented at least a week's wages for the common man and for that outlay, he would receive a single-sided product, sometimes containing less than two minutes of music. Clearly, Tamagno's recordings were aimed at upper-crust customers, as were those made by such eminent contemporaries of his as Nellie Melba, Adelina Patti, Pol Plançon and Mattia Battistini.

The small group of composers featured on Tamagno's combined recorded output of 1903 and 1904 comprises Giacomo Meyerbeer, Camille Saint-Saëns, Jules Massenet, de Lara, Giordano, Rossini and, naturally enough, Verdi. Apart from Otello, the operas from which he elected to record arias, in multiple takes, were Il trovatore, Guillaume Tell (Guglielmo Tell), Le prophète (Il profeta), Samson et Dalila (Sansone e Dalila), Hérodiade, Messaline and Andrea Chénier.

When he stepped before the recording horn, Tamagno was in poor health and semi-retirement after a long and demanding career. Consequently, his voice, although still powerful and kept under firm control, was no longer at its peak, though the recording technology of the time was almost certainly not equal to the task of capturing the full breadth of human vocals at the time.

Potter pays tribute to Tamagno's vocal attributes in his book about the history of tenor singing, averring that his "recorded legacy" is "a priceless connection with Verdi" while Steane, writing in The Grand Tradition (pp. 19–23), praises Tamagno's discs as "artistic and devoted performances by a singer of exceptional gifts" with a "great voice". Scott declares in The Record of Singing (pp. 131–133) that Tamagno's Otello recordings are "invaluable historically" with the Esultate in particular displaying "amazing force" and all of them exhibiting an "intensity of utterance" that is "unique". Indeed, Henry Pleasants, author of The Great Singers, goes so far as to say that the "searing despair" of Tamagno's version of Otello's death aria, Niun mi tema, "is possibly unmatched by anything else on wax" (Macmillan Publishing, revised edition, London, 1983, pp. 252–254).

Symposium Records has released a two-CD anthology of Tamagno's published and unpublished recordings (catalogue number 1186/87), while an extensive selection of them was issued on the Pearl/Opal label (CD 9846) in 1990. Those wanting to hear Tamagno in a broader context may wish to consult EMI's three-CD La Scala Edition, Volume One, 1878-1914 (CHS 7 64860 2). This edition contains four Tamagno tracks in expertly re-mastered transfers plus recordings made by a number of his colleagues, including baritone Victor Maurel, the creator of the role of Iago in Otello, and bass Francesco Navarini, the creator of the role of Lodovico in the same opera.

Of more specialist interest (but bringing us closer to Tamagno in recording quality) has been a 2007 release of all of Tamagno's extant 12-inch records on high-quality vinyl discs (pressed from the original metal "masters"/parts found in a German archive) by the United Kingdom firm Historic Masters. This was followed in 2012 by all the ten-inch recordings.

All but one of Tamagno's recordings (published or not) have been found. The Historic Masters boxed set is accompanied by a biographical essay written by Michael Aspinall, who also discusses Tamagno's discography and appraises his vocal technique. The set contains, among other things, a recently discovered recording of the Oath Duet from Otello ('Si pel ciel') and an aria from Messaline that was previously known only from a private test pressing once belonging to Tamagno. The baritone on the Otello duet is anonymous, but Aspinall believes it might be Tamagno's younger brother, Giovanni, who had a minor singing career. Aspinall concludes his essay thus: "Tamagno is one of the most charismatic and communicative singers ever to record his voice for the wonderment of future generations ... The privilege of listening to the complete recordings of Tamagno helps us to realise his immense stature among the great names of music drama."
