= Jeanne Hatto =

French operatic soprano (1879–1958)

- Jeanne Hatto in costume for Die Walkure, 1906
- Born: Marguerite Jeanne Frère; 30 January 1879; Saint-Amour-Bellevue, Burgundy, France
- Died: 26 March 1958 (aged 79); Paris, France
- Occupation: Opera singer (soprano)
- Partner: Louis Renault

Jeanne Hatto (30 January 1879 – 26 March 1958), born Marguerite Jeanne Frère, was a French operatic soprano.

== Early life and education ==
Hatto was born in Saint-Amour-Bellevue in Burgundy in 1879, and studied in Lyon and at the Conservatoire de Paris under Victor Warot.

== Career ==
Hatto made her début at the Paris Opéra in 1899. Her repertoire ranged from Rameau to Wagner. In the New Grove Dictionary of Opera, David Cummings writes of Hatto, "Her powerful voice and commanding stage presence made her a favourite in the dramatic repertory". Among her mainstream roles listed in that article are Elisabeth in Tannhäuser, Sieglinde in Die Walküre, Marguerite in Faust and Donna Elvira in Don Giovanni. In less familiar repertoire, she played Telaira in Rameau's Castor et Pollux, and Diana in the same composer's Hippolyte et Aricie and the title role in Ernest Reyer'sSalammbô. She created roles in operas by Camille Saint-Saëns (Les barbares, 1901), Xavier Leroux (Astarté, 1901) and Ernest Chausson (Le roi Arthur, 1903 and 1923).

Russian sculptor Alexandre Zeitlin created and exhibited a bust of Hatto in 1900. In 1903, Hatto sang songs by Léon Moreau in a concert with the composer providing piano accompaniment. In 1904, Hatto was the soloist in the first performance of Ravel's song cycle Shéhérazade, and was the dedicatee of the first and longest song of the cycle, "Asie".

== Personal life and legacy ==
Hatto was in a relationship with industrialist Louis Renault; they lived together for more than a decade, but she refused to marry him. She died in Paris in 1958. A road in Hatto's native town is named in her honour.
