= Merey =

Merey may refer to:

== People ==
- Edna Merey-Apinda (born 1976), Gabonese writer
- Jane Mérey (1872–?), Belgian opera singer
- Kajetan von Mérey (1861–1931), Austro-Hungarian diplomat
- Merey Akshalov (born 1989), Kazakhstani boxer
- Mihály Mérey (1500–1572), Hungarian jurist and noble
- Victor Merey, Arab-Israeli football player

== Places ==
- Merey, Eure, commune in the Eure department of the Normandy region in northern France
- Mérey-Vieilley, commune in the Doubs department in the Bourgogne-Franche-Comté region in eastern France
- Mérey-sous-Montrond, former commune in the Doubs department in the Bourgogne-Franche-Comté region in eastern France

== Other ==
- Merey language, Afro-Asiatic language spoken in northern Cameroon
