= Eugénie Vergin =

French singer and singing teacher

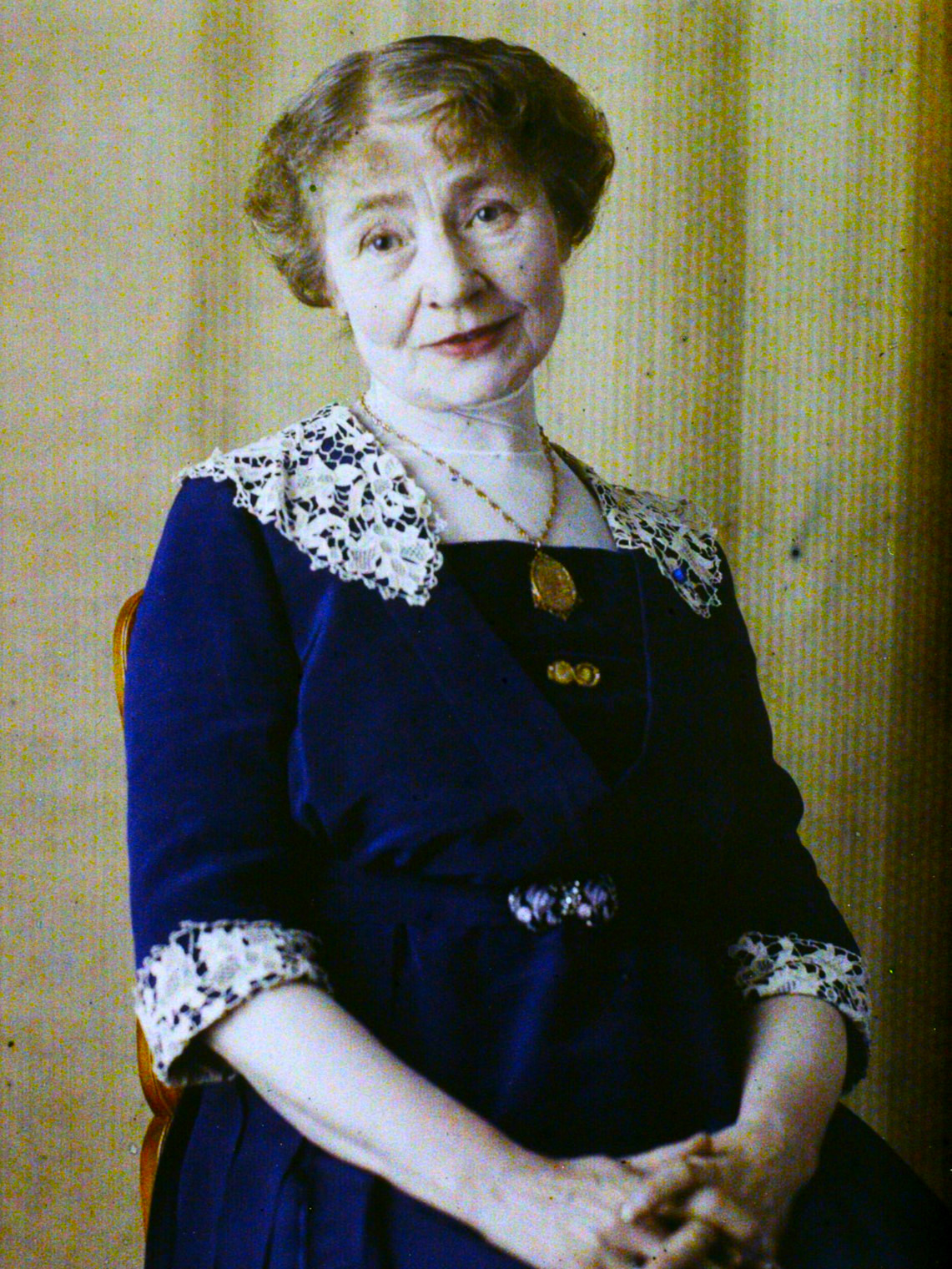
1920 Autochrome by Auguste Léon

Eugénie Élise Vergin sometimes also known under the name Élise Colonne or Alice Colonne (21 March 1864 – 16 November 1941) was a French singer and singing teacher.

== Life ==
Born in Lille, Vergin entered the Conservatoire de Paris in 1873 where she won the first prizes in singing and opéra-comique in 1875. Later, she sang at concerts of the Association Artistique du Châtelet recently founded by Édouard Colonne where her performance of the role of Marguerite in Berlioz's La Damnation de Faust on 17 November 1878 was particularly acclaimed.

On 30 September 1886, she married Édouard Colonne.

Vergine Collone was known for her excellent musicality. She was in great demand as a singing teacher in Paris where she founded a successful singing school. Vera Nimidoff, Judith Lasalle were her pupils.

== Awards ==
- Chevalier of the Légion d'honneur (1929)
- Officier of the Ordre des Arts et des Lettres (1890); Officier de l’instruction publique (1898)
