= Alexandre Zeitlin =

Russian sculptor

- Born: 1872; Tiflis, Georgia, Russia
- Died: April 4, 1946 (aged 73); New York City, United States
- Other names: Alexander Zeitlin
- Occupation: Sculptor
- Known for: Portrait busts

Alexandre Zeitlin (Russian: Александр Моисеевич Цейтлин; 1872–1946) was a Russian sculptor known for his portrait busts.

== Life and career ==
Alexandre Zeitlin was born in Tiflis, Georgia, Russia, in 1872. He held his first art exhibition in his hometown as an early teenager. He studied at the Academy of Fine Arts Vienna (1890–1894), where his portrait busts of actor Friedrich Mitterwurzer and Archduke Otto were recognized. He then studied at the École des Beaux-Arts of Paris. Zeitlin's statue Despair and a portrait bust of opera singer Jeanne Hatto were among his first to receive public recognition. He became known for his portrait busts. Zeitlin received a Ordre des Palmes académiques (1903) for busts of Camille Flammarion and was made an officer of public instruction (1907) for his statue of senator Louis Bizarelli. Zeitlin worked in Paris for over 20 years.

In 1915, Zeitlin moved to New York City, where he remained for the rest of his life. He died in Knickerbocker Hospital on March 4, 1946. Zeitlin had a wife, Sofie. One of his two brothers, Leo, was a violinist and a professor at the Moscow Conservatory. His nephew Alexander was a conductor at the Bolshoi Theater in Moscow.

His works have been collected internationally including institutions in the United States, France, and Russia. His portrait bust of Edward VII, Prince of Wales, narrowly predated his coronation.
