= Jeanne Gerville-Réache =

French operatic contralto

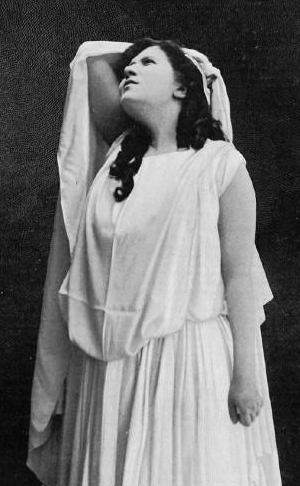
Jeanne Gerville-Réache in Gluck's Orfeo ed Euridice

Jeanne Gerville-Réache (26 March 1882 – 5 January 1915) was a French operatic lyric contralto from the Belle Époque. She possessed a remarkably beautiful voice, an excellent singing technique, and wide vocal range which enabled her to perform several roles traditionally associated with mezzo-sopranos in addition to contralto parts. Her career began successfully in Europe just before the turn of the twentieth century. She travelled to North America in 1907, where she worked as an immensely popular singer until her sudden death in 1915. She is particularly remembered for her portrayal of Dalila in Camille Saint-Saëns' Samson et Dalila, which she helped establish as an important part of the repertory within the United States. She also notably portrayed the role of Geneviève in the world premiere of Debussy's Pelléas et Mélisande in 1902.

== Biography ==
Jeanne Gerville-Réache was born in Orthez, France. Her father was the governor of the French Caribbean islands Guadeloupe and Martinique, and she spent her childhood in Martinique with him and her Spanish mother. She studied in Paris under Rosine Laborde through whom she met operatic soprano Emma Calvé, a former pupil of Laborde's. Calvé arranged for Gerville-Réache to make her professional opera début as Orphée in Gluck's Orphée et Eurydice at the Opéra-Comique in 1899. Mezzo-soprano Pauline García-Viardot coached her for this first production and then continued to teach her for the next several years.

Gerville-Réache was offered a permanent place at the Opéra-Comique in 1900 and she sang there through 1902. While there she sang roles in two world premieres, Catherine in Camille Erlanger's Le Juif polonais (1900) and the role of Geneviève in Debussy's Pelléas et Mélisande in 1902. Shortly after Pelléas et Mélisande, Gerville-Réache got in a heated argument with the Opéra-Comique 's director, Albert Carré, and she left the company. In 1903 she joined the roster at the Théâtre Royal de la Monnaie in Brussels where she appeared in five operas over the next two seasons. She made her debut at the Royal Opera House, London, in 1905 in the role of Orpheus.

In 1907, Gerville-Réache travelled to the United States for the first time to sing with the Manhattan Opera Company in New York City, where she performed roles until 1910. She notably reprised the role of Geneviève in the United States premiere of Pelléas et Mélisande (1908) and gave a critically acclaimed performance as Dalila in Saint-Saëns' Samson et Dalila. She also sang in the world premiere of Jan Blockx's De Herbergprinses (performed in Italian as La Princesse d'Auberge, 1909), and in the United States premiere of Richard Strauss's Elektra (1910) as Klytaemnestra, the latter of which she did not enjoy singing. In 1910 she married Georges Gibier Rambaud who was the director of the Pasteur Institute's branch in New York City.

From 1910 until 1912, Gerville-Réache sang with the Chicago Grand Opera Company and appeared in operas in Boston and Philadelphia. She portrayed such roles as Dalila, the title role in Bizet's Carmen, Brangäne in Richard Wagner's Tristan und Isolde, and Fricka in Wagner's Die Walküre. From 1914 until 1915 she sang with the National Canadian Opera in Montreal.

Gerville-Réache died at the early age of 32 from food poisoning in New York City. Up to this point, everything had indicated a spectacular continuation of her brilliant career and the music community lamented the loss of what several critics had deemed "one of the most beautiful voices of the century". Her voice is preserved on several recordings made with Columbia Records and the Victor Talking Machine Company between 1908 and 1913. She left behind her husband and two sons. She has a great-great-grandson and granddaughter living in America.
