= Lucette Korsoff =

Italian-born soprano of Russian heritage (1876–1955)

Lucette Korsoff, sometimes given as Lucette Korsov, (1 February 1876 – 14 February 1955) was an Italian-born soprano of Russian heritage who had a performance career in operas and concerts from 1893 until her retirement in 1922. She worked primarily in France, Beligium, and Italy, but also made appearances in Russia, the United States, and England. After retiring from performance she worked as a voice teacher in Paris and Brussels.

== Biography ==
=== Early life and initial career ===
The daughter of Russian baritone Bogomir Korsoff, Lucette Korsoff was born in Genoa on 1 February 1876. Despite her birth in the Kingdom of Italy, Grove Music Online described her as a "Russian soprano" as both her parents were Russian. Her father was born Bogomir Goehring, but changed the family surname to Korsoff after the name of his Milanese teacher, Corsi. Lucette began her career performing in her father's touring Russian opera troupe at the age of sixteen. She gave her first performance with this organization in 1893 at the Imperial Theatre in Moscow in Pergolesi's La serva padrona.

=== Career in France and Belgium ===
After this Korsoff went to Paris to pursue training as an opera singer. Her teachers included Frédéric Boyer and Rosine Laborde. In 1900 she toured with a French opera company to Egypt where she appeared as Ophelia in Ambroise Thomas's Hamlet with Maurice Renaud in the title role. Her first appearance in a French opera house occurred at the Théâtre du Capitole in 1901. In 1902 she became a member of the Opéra-Comique (OC) in Paris; obtaining this position after being recommended to that theatre by Renaud. She made her debut at the OC in the title role of Lakmé which was followed by a performance as Mařenka in the French première of The Bartered Bride. Other early roles she sang at the OC included Marie in Donizetti's La fille du régiment, Micaëla in Carmen, Philine in Mignon, and Rosina in The Barber of Seville.

Korsoff remained at the OC until 1906 when she was appointed a principal artist at La Monnaie in Brussels. She was committed to that theatre through 1908. After this she worked for a short period as a principal soprano at the Algerian National Opera until returning to the OC once again from 1908 to 1910 where she had a major triumph as the Queen of Night in Mozart's The Magic Flute in 1909. She also sang the title role in Manon at the OC. She spent three months touring with the OC in 1910 for performances in Romania, Turkey, Egypt, and Greece. In 1910–1911 she was committed once again to La Monnaie.

=== Later performance career ===
Korsoff came to the United States and sang at the French Opera House (FOH) in New Orleans in 1911–1912; making her debut at this theatre as Lakme. In March 1912 she toured with the company of the FOH, then led by baritone and artistic director Jules Layolle, to Minneapolis where she performed both Lakme and Manon. This was followed by further performances with the FOH in Spring of 1912 at the Garrick Theatre in Detroit, the Colonial Theater in Cleveland, Ohio, the Shubert Theatre in Rochester, New York, and Broadway's Lyric Theatre in New York City. She also performed in Chicago in 1912, and appeared in operas at the Boston Opera House in 1912–1913. She also gave performances at the Mariinsky Theatre in 1912.

In 1913 Korsoff return to Italy to pursue further vocal training in Milan with Teresa Arkel. After this she primarily worked in Italy until her retirement. However she did appear as a guest artist in London in 1914, and was a guest at the Opéra de Monte-Carlo in 1918. She returned to Monte Carlo for one of her last performances; appearing as Orlinde in the world premiere of Massenet's Amadis in 1922. She retired later that same year.

=== Retirement, teaching, and death ===
In retirement Korsoff worked as a voice teacher in Paris and Brussels. She taught in Paris from 1922 until moving to Brussels in 1936. Her pupils included soprano Gina Cigna, bass Tadeusz Wierzbicki, and tenor Joseph Rogachewsky. She died in Brussels on 14 February 1955.

== Recordings ==
1911 recording of Lucette Korsoff singing "Les oiseaux dans la charmille" from Offenbach's The Tales of Hoffmann.

Korsoff made recordings in Paris with Zonophone in 1905–1906, and with Gramophone & Typewriter Ltd in 1906. The Discography of American Historical Recordings catalogues several recording made by Korsoff for Edison Records. These are dated to 1910 and 1914. She also made recordings with Vocalion Records, the French division of HMV, and Pathé Records. Grove Music Online states: "Her many recordings of the lyric-coloratura repertory are highly accomplished in technique, fresh of tone and animated in presentation."
