= Louis de Gramont =

French writer (1854–1912)

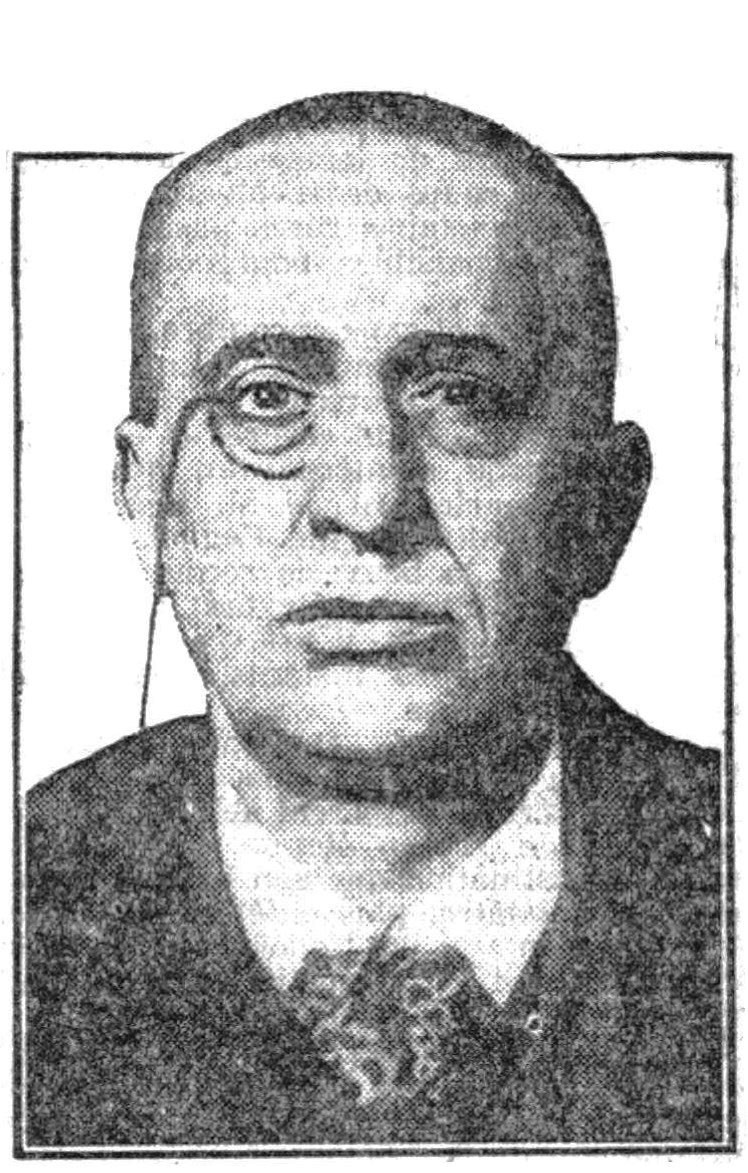
Louis Ferdinand Portrait

Louis Ferdinand de Gramont (1854 – 9 December 1912) was a French journalist, dramatist, and librettist. He was a son of Ferdinand de Gramont.

Gramont was born in Sèvres and finished his studies at the college there, then entered the School of Law. He pursued journalism and wrote for such periodicals as Radical, L'Éclair, La Presse, Petit bleu, L'Aurore, and La Cocarde, and, in 1890, became a writer for L'Intransigent. He was also critic of drama and music. Gramont died in Paris in 1912.

He wrote the following plays or opera libretti:

- L'orage, comedy (1874)
- Othello, drama after Shakespeare (Odéon, 15 April 1882)
- Rolande, drama (Théâtre-Libre 5 November 1888)
- Loulou (1888)
- Esclarmonde, co-author with Alfred Blau, libretto to the opera by Jules Massenet (Opéra-Comique, 15 May 1889)
- Lucienne, drama (Menus-Plaisirs, 2 December 1890)
- La locataire de Mme Biou (1891)
- Simone, drama (Théâtre-Libre, 28 April 1892)
- Évangéline, légende acadienne, music by Xavier Leroux (La Monnaie, Brussels, December 1895)
- Astarté, opera libretto to music by Xavier Leroux (Paris Opéra, 15 February 1901)
- Vénus et Adonis, légende lyrique, music by Xavier Leroux (Arènes de Nîmes, 13 August 1905)
- William Ratcliff, drama, music by Xavier Leroux (Nice, January 1906)
- Jules César, drama after Shakespeare (1906)

== Bibliography ==
- J. Martin, Nos auteurs et compositeurs dramatiques.
- G. Avenel, La presse franc, au XXe s., 1901.
