= Jane Mérey =

19th-century Belgian opera singer

Marie Jeanne La Tour called Jane Mérey (12 October 1872 – ?) was a Belgian opera singer and singing teacher, singer at La Monnaie of Brussels and at the Opéra-Comique in Paris.

== Career ==
Born in Ghent, Mérey studied singing with Carlotta Patti and Rosine Laborde in Paris. She made her debut at the Royal Opera of Versailles in November 1893 in the title role of Lakmé. In May 1894, she participated in the premiere of Lucy de Montgomery's Aréthuse in Monte-Carlo. (Note: Lucy de Pembroke, comtesse de Montgomery (1861–1920) on wikisource)

She was hired at La Monnaie where she began in 1894 in the title role of Mireille. On 28 December 1895, she created the title role of Xavier Leroux's Évangeline.

On 10 December 1897, she made her debut at the Opéra-Comique in the role of Mireille. During the 1898–1899 season, she sang at the Opéra national de Bordeaux.

In 1897, she married a young industrialist, Armand Ledocte, to whom she promised to renounce the theatre, but she did not keep this commitment; then her husband sued the theatre directors who hired her. Finally, Mérey pleaded for divorce and won her case on July 26, 1902.

In 1903, when she had just been hired at La Monnaie, she was the victim of an assassination attempt by her ex-husband armed with a revolver. She was wounded by a bullet through her hand. The injury was quite serious and she had to be replaced by Lalla Miranda.

In 1903 and 1904, she toured the provinces, then Bordeaux and Marseille.

From 1906, she taught singing in Paris.

She sang in private performances and galas. Remarried in 1908 to the lawyer Arthur Valabrègue, she later taught at Menton, where she still practiced in 1939.

== References and notes ==
Notes
