= Rosine Laborde =

French singer and singing teacher

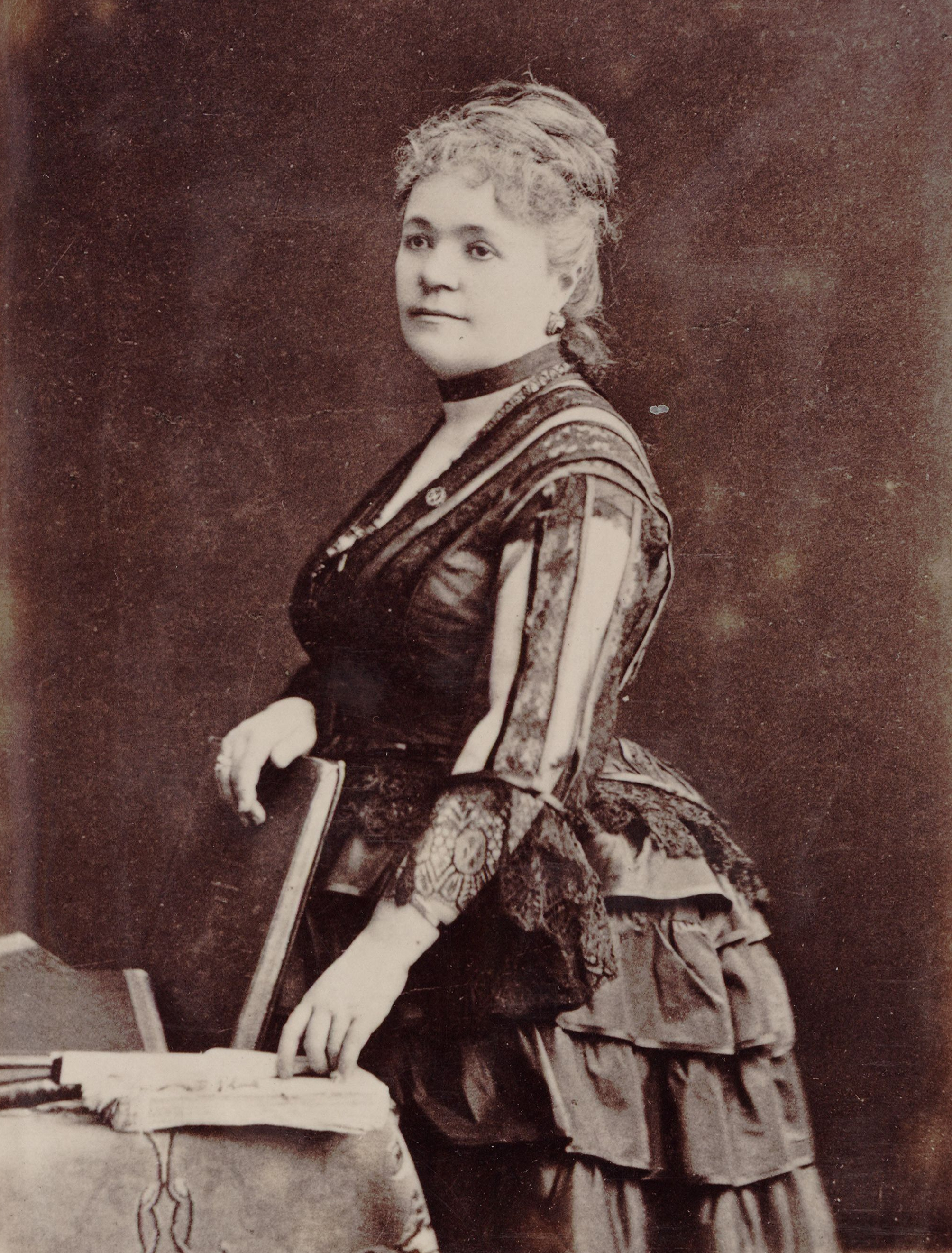
Rosine Laborde

Rosalie Henriette Bediez, known as Mlle Villaume, Mlle Villiomi in her early days, and then as Rosine Laborde, (1 April 1824 – 1 September 1907) was a French singer and singing teacher.

== Biography ==
Laborde was born in Paris. She studied with Adolphe Grognier and Mocker. She was admitted to the Conservatoire de Paris on 23 December 1833. She received lessons from Panseron, and obtained the 2nd prize in solfège in 1836 and the first prize the following year.

In June 1839, Miss Villaume (Note: Her mother Mrs Bediez having remarried, her daughter bore this name, which was that of her stepfather.) lost her voice and had to leave the conservatory; she continued her musical studies with a new master, Pierinarini. When her voice returned, she obtained an audition at the Opéra-Comique. On 24 September 1840, a three-year contract was signed. Miss Villaume made her debut on December 10, 1840, at the Opéra-Comique as Isabelle in Hérold's Le Pré aux Clercs.

The following year, under the name Villiomi, (Note: Miss Villaume was forced to Italianize her name.) she sang at the Comédie-Italienne. She had her first performance on January 15, 1841, in the role of Queen Amaltea in Rossini's Mosè in Egitto.

Two years later, she performed at the Ghent Theatre. Her debut took place on 8 November 1842 in Donizetti's Lucia di Lammermoor, in French. In May 1843, she made her first appearance at La Monnaie, in Brussels, in Lucia. On August 22 of the same year, she married the tenor Jean-Auguste Dur-Laborde.

Engaged at the Paris Opera, she began on 8 April 1849 in the role of Marguerite de Valois in Meyerbeer's Les Huguenots, then performing in Louis-Sébastien Lebrun's Lucie and Le Rossignol and creating the role of Nephthah in Auber's L'enfant prodigue. She sang in Robert le Diable, La muette de Portici, William Tell, Mosè in Egitto, le Comte Ory, while at the same time achieving success in concerts. She created a role in Théodore Labarre's Pantagruel in 1855, the only performance of which was a failure.

Then, after seven years at the Opera, Laborde embarked on a career abroad in Norma, Martha, La Sonnambula, and The Barber of Séville. She sang at La Scala of Milan, Barcelona, Rio de Janeiro, New York, Boston, Philadelphia, Berlin, Stettin, Riga, and Moscow.

Around 1865, she made her farewell to the stage and returned to Paris, and began a new career in teaching, her students included Lucy Arbell, Emma Calvé, Marie Delna, Jeanne Gerville-Réache, Lucette Korsoff, Jane Mérey, Rose Stelle-Pourtet, and Meyrianne Héglon.

Laborde died in Chézy-sur-Marne. She is buried in the Passy Cemetery. The bust of the singer on her tomb was sculpted by Paul Landowski.

== Writings ==
- Méthode de chant (in French). Paris: Henry Lemoine. 1899. p. 151..

== Awards ==
Officier of the Ordre des Palmes Académiques

== References and notes ==
Notes

== Sources ==
- Rosine Laborde on Gallica
