= Astarté (opera) =

Opera by Xavier Leroux

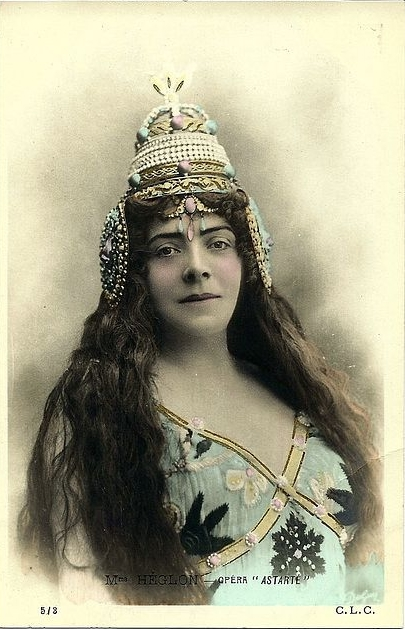
Meyrianne Héglon as Omphale

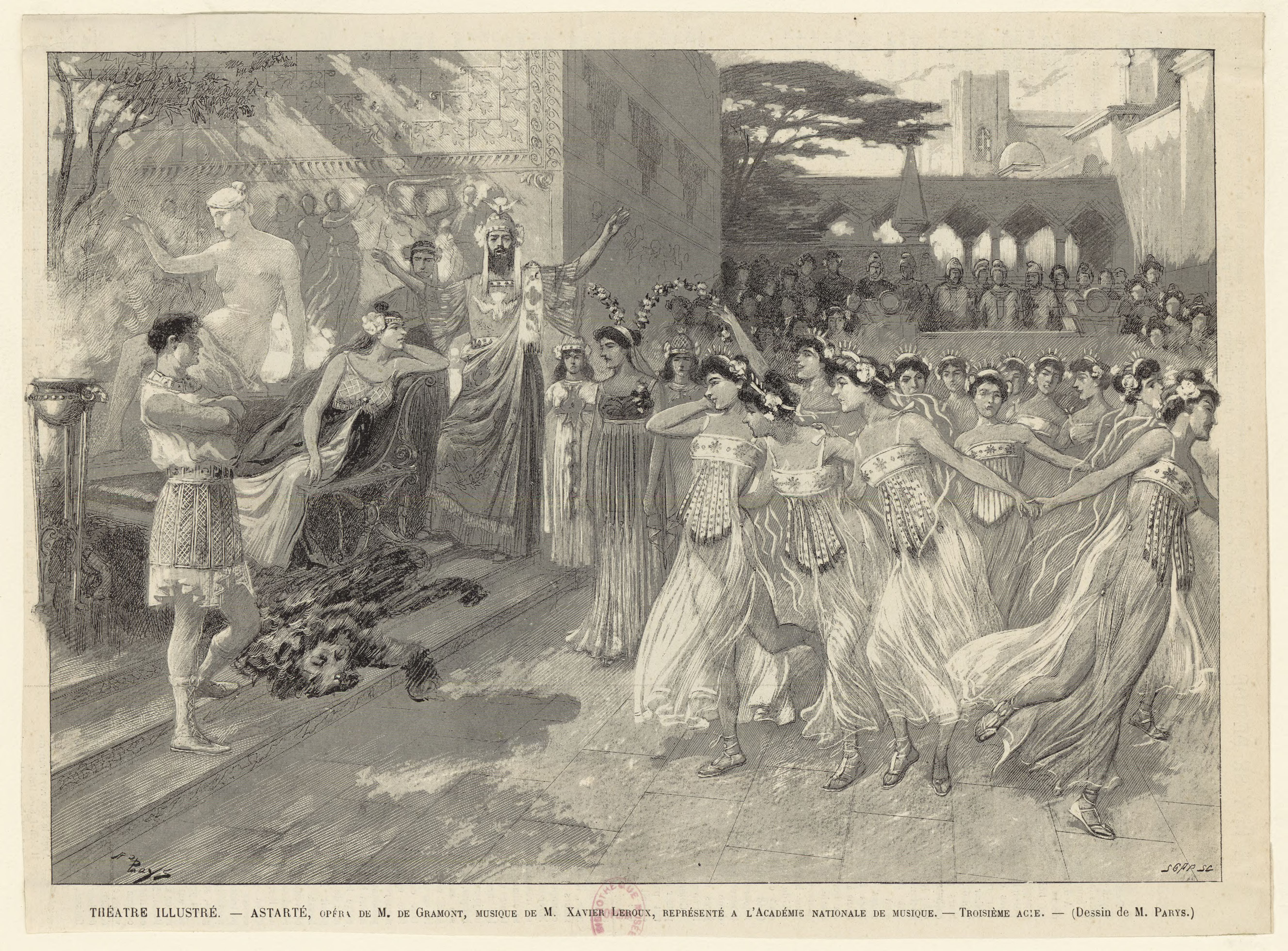
Act 3

Astarté is an opera in four acts and five scenes by Xavier Leroux to a libretto by Louis de Gramont. It was premiered at the Opéra de Paris on 15 February 1901, directed by Pedro Gailhard.

The protagonist is the hero Heracles, who falls under the control of the Lydian queen Omphale. Omphale is depicted as a cultist of Astarte.

== Roles ==
Roles, voice types, premiere cast
Role	Voice type	Premiere cast, 15 February 1901 Conductor: Paul Taffanel
Omphale	contralto	Meyrianne Héglon
Heracles	tenor haute-contre	Albert Alvarez
Phur	bass-baritone	Francisque Delmas
Hylas	tenor	Léon Laffite
Euphanor	bass	Juste Nivette
Corybas	tenor	Georges Joseph Cabillot
Déjanire	soprano	Louise Grandjean
Iole	soprano	Jeanne Hatto
Cléanthis	soprano	Vera Nimidoff
A maid	soprano	Madeleine Mathieu

== Synopsis ==
=== Act 1 ===
Heracles, Duke of Argos, plans to undertake a new campaign to destroy the infamous cult of the goddess Astarte. He will go to Lydia, in order to exterminate the queen Omphale, a cruel and indecent sectarian of this goddess. Nothing can hold him back, not even the love of his wife Deianira. She wants to use a talisman to warn him against Omphale's seductions, which she fears. This talisman is the famous tunic of the centaur Nessos that the latter gave her, telling her that when Hercules put it on, he would never look at another woman again. She therefore instructs Iole, her ward, to follow in her husband's footsteps and give him the box containing the bloody tunic.

=== Act 2 ===
Heracles arrives with his people in Lydia, under the walls of Sardis. Hercules and his warriors are outside the city gates. Hercules leaves for a moment, then the women of Sardis take the opportunity to charm his soldiers, who follow them into the city singing and dancing, so that when Hercules returns he finds no one but the high priest Phur, who invites him to enter himself.

=== Act 3 ===
Heracles is in the palace of Omphale, which he has come to destroy. However, when he is in the presence of Omphale, he throws down his weapons and falls to her knees, bewitched. Indeed, she, in love and pride, demands that the entire city witness such an astonishing submission. While Heracles remains prostrate, Phur performs the ceremony of the cult of Astarte. First there are serious rites, slow dances, then, little by little, an immense furious joy seizes the priests and priestesses, courtesans and guards and it is a mystical and frenetic orgy of passion and possession. Omphale extends her arms to Hercules who rushes into them.

=== Act 4 ===
In the morning, Heracles and Omphale sing of their happiness in a triumphant way. The lover had never known such exhilaration; the lover had never shuddered under such an embrace. Phur disturbs this agreement. He shows Heracles the fragility of such ties that only marriage would make lasting. Omphale, to whom the marriage is proposed, does not want to consent to it and, in the face of the anger caused by her refusal, she asks Astarte to put an end to this embarrassing adventure. Iole is brought in, disguised as a boy. She explains the mission she is in charge of and Omphale, who guesses her sex and calls her Eros' sweet sister, allows her to accomplish it, on the condition that she stays with her and never leaves her. Their voices unite tenderly and Heracles, now dressed in the magical tunic and in the grip of the intolerable suffering of fire, screams and twists. He throws shreds of red cloth against the walls that are burning. And the city also burns and hearts and bodies are set on fire and it is to Lesbos that Omphale now returns to worship Astarte and glorify all lust.

== Critics at the premiere ==
Astarté was favourably received at its premiere. Alfred Bruneau, the critic of Le Figaro applauded the work and wrote

This score is frankly, categorically an opera score. Quite numerous and characteristic themes are recalled from page to page, especially in the first act. This act is a kind of fresco of superb intensity of colour, of superb brilliance: The brass bands that, from the theatre, respond to the orchestra, the heroic songs of Hercules, Deianira's ...invocation to the fire, have an extraordinary movement, an extraordinary power. The farewells of the husband to the wife, widely, nobly declaimed and where Gluck's breath seems to pass are magnificent. I don't like the orientalism of the second act and I must admit that the long and passionate duets that follow didn't seem so well inspired to me. They lack what would have been essential there, variety in feeling. But the religious and orgiastic ceremonies and the final chorus are not to be disdained.

Arthur Pougin is not kind and seemingly responding to Bruneau wrote in Le Ménestrel:

This strange play has very few scenic or dramatic qualities. In the first act, Heracles is with Deianira; in the second, he only appears; in the third and fourth, he is constantly with Omphale. We understand the few varieties of situations and the few elements they offer to the musician. In the first act, there is Heracles' call to his warriors, and in the second, the scene of seduction exerted on them by the women of Sardis. But these are scenic episodes, not dramatic situations. The work is conceived in the pure Wagnerian system, with endless themes, eternal dialogues without the voices ever joining each other, and leitmotivs. There is even a terrible one, that of Hercules, which visibly haunted the composer's mind, and which makes one shudder when it returns periodically, attacked by the trumpets in their highest notes."

Paul Milliet of Le Monde artiste was very favourable and wrote:

Xavier Leroux has musical eloquence... The whole first act is superb ... the farewells of Deianira are of remarkable nobility. These beginnings of the drama have magnificence and power. The following two acts are completely successful; the scene of seduction played by Omphale; the religious ceremony where everything else, the sets, the lighting and the staging, is admirably combined to reproduce the phallic and orgiastic cults of Asia; the awakening of the lovers; the prayer to the divine Astarte. The score of Astarté is of a beautiful and strong inspiration; and it deserves the warm applause that welcomed it. Mr. Xavier Leroux honours the French school, and his success delights me in every way.

== Modern analysis ==
Alex Ross of The New Yorker wrote

Omphale is the priestess of Astarte's Saphic cult, and Hercules is shown in drag, observing what appears to be a lesbian orgy. Hercules intends to put an end to debauchery but falls in love with Omphale instead. ... The opera ends with the priestess reconstituting her Sapphic circle on the island of Lesbos, as a chorus sings: "Glory to pleasure".

and Ross indicates that the German magazine Jahrbuch für sexuelle Zwischenstufen noted: "Astarté is probably the first opera to be performed, and generally the first theatre piece, in which lesbian love is represented."

== Sources ==
- Astarté : partition intégrale (piano-chant) on the site of the Médiathèque musicale de Paris.
- Camille Bellaigue (1 March 1901). "Revue musicale; Astarté à l'Opéra; La Fille de Tabarin à l'Opéra-Comique". Revue des deux Mondes (in French). Paris. pp. 219–228.
