= Louise Grandjean =

French operatic soprano

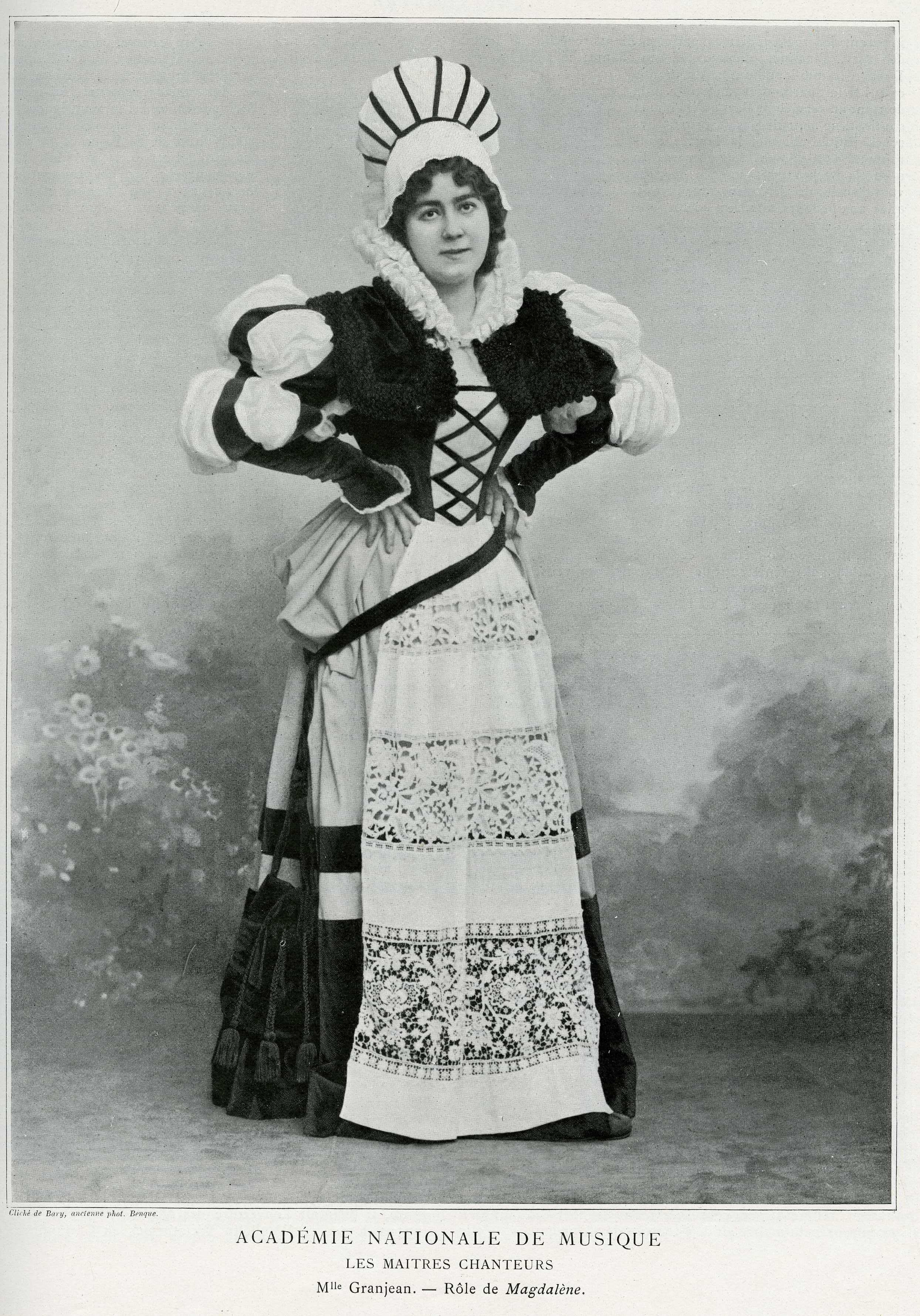
Grandjean as Magdalena in Richard Wagner's opera Die Meistersinger von Nürnberg

Louise Grandjean (1870–1934) was a French operatic dramatic soprano who was particularly admired for her portrayals of Wagner and Verdi heroines. She began her career in Paris in 1894 where she became a popular and active singer until 1911. She also regularly appeared in Germany during the first decade of the twentieth century with great success.

== Biography ==
Grandjean studied at the Conservatoire de Paris before making her professional opera debut in 1893 at the Opéra Comique as Isabella in Le Pré aux clercs. She sang numerus roles at that opera house over the next nine years, including Alice Ford in France's first production of Verdi's Falstaff in 1894. Beginning in 1895 she was also a member of the Opéra National de Paris, making her debut as The Page in Richard Wagner's Tannhäuser. She sang numerous roles with the national opera until 1911, including the world premieres of Xavier Leroux's Astarté (1901), Jules Massenet's Ariane (1906), and Fernand Le Borne's La Catalane (1907).

In addition to her work in Paris, Grandjean also appeared in productions at the Opéra de Monte-Carlo, the Berlin State Opera, and the Bayreuth Festival between 1902 and 1911. In Monte Carlo she sang in the premieres of Eugène d'Harcourt's Le Tasse (1903) and Alfred Bruneau's Naïs Micoulin (1907) among other roles. In 1904 she sang an acclaimed Venus in Tannhäuser at the Bayreuth Festival. This was followed by numerous appearances at the Berlin State Opera in roles such as Donna Anna in the Don Giovanni, Valentine in Les Huguenots, Berthe in Le prophète, the Chimène in Le Cid, Salomé in Hérodiade, the title role in Aida, Desdemona in Otello, Elizabeth in Tannhäuser, Elsa in Lohengrin, Eva in Die Meistersinger von Nürnberg, and Isolde in Tristan und Isolde. After retiring from the stage, Grandjean taught singing at the Paris Conservatory.
