= Rose Stelle-Pourtet =

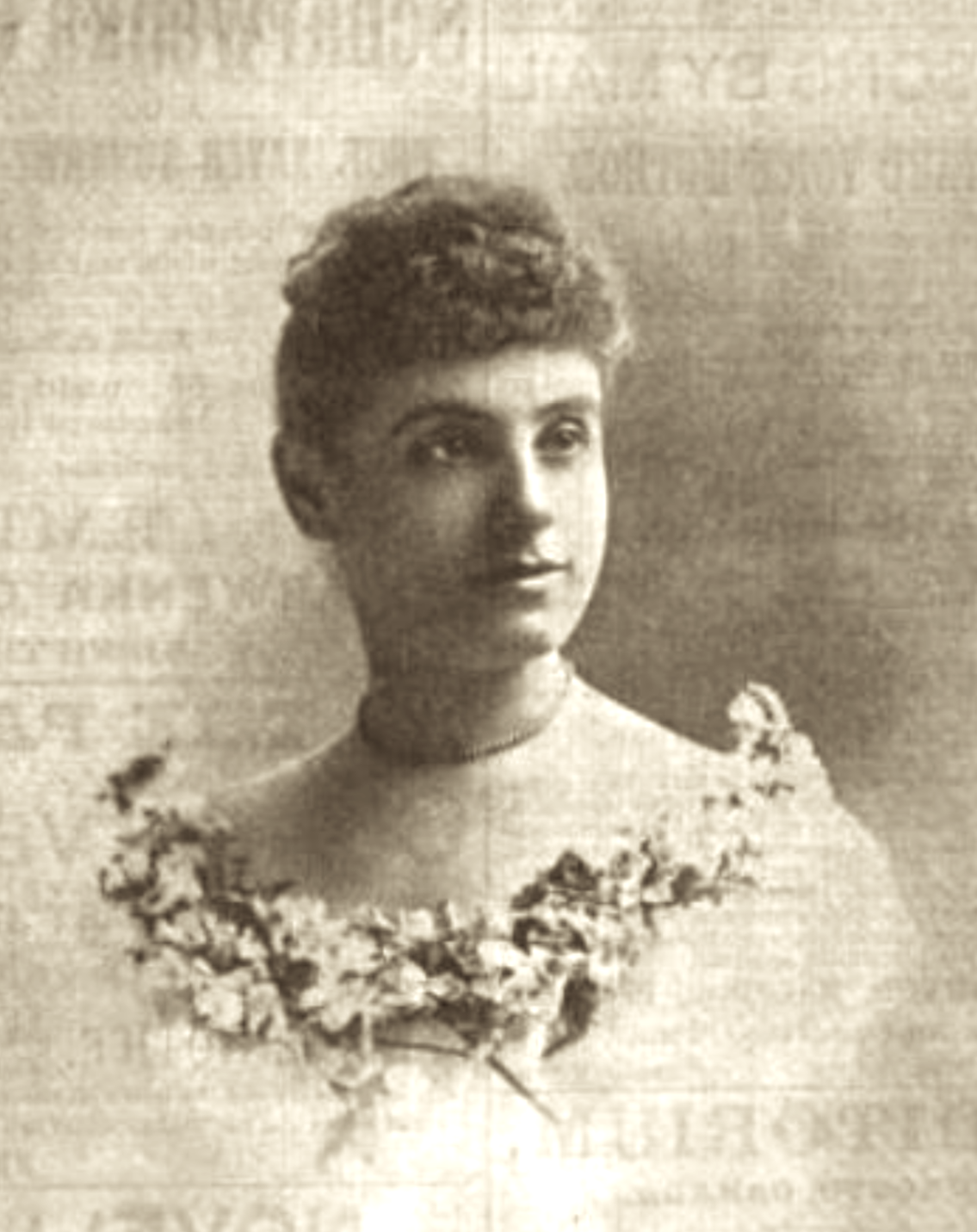
Rose Schottenfels, from the front cover of The Musical Courier on November 18, 1891.

Rose Schottenfels, also known as Rose Stelle and Rose Stelle-Pourtet, (born 5 November 1865 - died after 1918) was an American soprano. She began her career in New York City in the 1890s; performing with ensembles like the New York Symphony Orchestra and the orchestra of the Metropolitan Opera. In 1894 she relocated to Paris to study with Rosine Laborde. There she adopted the stage name of Rose Stelle and married the critic and journalist Eugène Pourtet in 1905. She sang with orchestras in France and the Opéra de Nice. In 1914, the year of her husband's death, she spent five months working as a nurse in a war zone in France during World War I. She returned to New York in 1915 and was still living at the time of her mother's death in 1918.

== Early life and education ==
The daughter of Maurice Schottenfels and Lena Schottenfels (nee Haas), Rose Schottenfels was born in New York City on 5 November 1865. In New York she studied at Normal College (now Hunter College) and the New York College of Music. Her voice teachers included Marie Gramm, Frank de Rialp, and Julius Stockhausen. Her piano teachers included Max Pinner and Rafael Joseffy.

== Early career ==
In 1890 Rose became a principal singer with Ruby Brooks's concert organization. That same year she worked for the North American Phonograph Company in New York City giving demonstrations of what was then new phonograph technology. This included giving public demonstrations from the stage of Proctor's Twenty-Third Street Theatre. In February 1891 Rose sang in a series of chamber music concerts given at Chickering Hall with harpist Maud Morgan and her father, the organist and composer George Washbourne Morgan.

Rose sang in multiple concerts in New York City organized by impresario George W. Floyd in 1891. In October 1891 she performed as a soloist at Madison Square Garden under conductor Anton Seidl. Seidl led the orchestra of the Metropolitan Opera with Rose singing excerpts of music from the operas Cavalleria rusticana, Le Cid, Fidelio, and Götterdämmerung. In December 1891 she was a soprano soloist in Felix Mendelssohn's Elijah with conductor Walter Damrosch and the New York Symphony Orchestra at the Lyceum Theater in Rochester, New York. In March 1892 to she gave a recital at Carnegie Hall with Isidor Luckstone as her accompanist, and Franz Wilczek assisting with violin music on certain pieces. The following November she performed in a concert with Victor Herbert in White Plains, New York.

In April 1893 Rose was a guest soloist in a concert with the New York Maennerchor in NYC, and performed in a concert at the Hasbrouck Institute in New Jersey. She rejoined with Victor Herbert to perform a concert of music by Franz Schubert in Jersey City, New Jersey in January 1894.

== Work in Europe and later career ==
In 1894 Rose went to Paris to study singing with Rosine Laborde. By 1898 she was studying voice with tenor Juliani (pseydonym of Jules Ropiquet) who had a school for singing in Paris.In 1900 she performed in a season of operas at the Opéra de Nice. In 1902 she was a soloist with the Société Philharmonique in Paris, In 1903 she was a soloist with the English Ladies' Orchestral Society in a concert sponsored by Queen Alexandra at St James's Hall.

Rose remained in Paris where she married Eugène Jean Marie Pourtet on January 3, 1905. Her husband was an art critic and parliamentary journalist Shortly after her marriage, billed as Rose Stelle-Pourtet, she gave a concert of all new music by American composer Zudie Harris in Paris which was reviewed well in Le courier musicale. During the early part of World War I she spent five months working in a war zone as a nurse for the American Red Cross. Her husband died around this time, and she returned to New York City in early 1915. On March 10, 1915 she gave a public lecture on French composers at the St. Regis New York hotel. She was still living when her mother died in New York City in 1918.
