= Harriet Zeitlin =

American painter

- Born: 1929 (age 96–97); Philadelphia, Pennsylvania, U.S.
- Education: University of Pennsylvania; Pennsylvania Academy of the Fine Arts; Santa Monica College; University of California, Los Angeles
- Known for: Painting; Printmaking

Harriet Zeitlin (born 1929) is an American artist. Long a painter and printmaker, she has more recently begun working in sculpture.

== Life ==
Born in Philadelphia, Zeitlin earned her BFA at the University of Pennsylvania and the Pennsylvania Academy of the Fine Arts, which institutions she attended from 1946 to 1950; she received additional instruction at the Barnes Foundation from 1948 to 1950. She took printmaking classes at the University of California, Los Angeles from 1963 to 1969, and studied photography at Santa Monica City College from 1980 to 1981. She has exhibited both alone and in group shows throughout the United States and worldwide.

During the 1970’s Zeitlin served as President of Artists for Economic Action in Los Angeles, and Executive Director of a CETA Title VI Art in Public Places program, which employed 10 local artist to make public art around the city.

Among the institutions which hold examples of her work are the Los Angeles County Museum of Art and the Library of Congress, as well as many private and corporate collections. She received a second prize from the Atlanta College of Art in 1988, and received grants from the California Arts Council (1977–1978) and the City of Los Angeles (1990–1991). She has taught printmaking, mask making, quiltmaking, and painting in her own studio and in public and private extension classes around Los Angeles and Santa Monica, California.
