= Édouard Colonne =

French conductor and violinist (1838–1910)

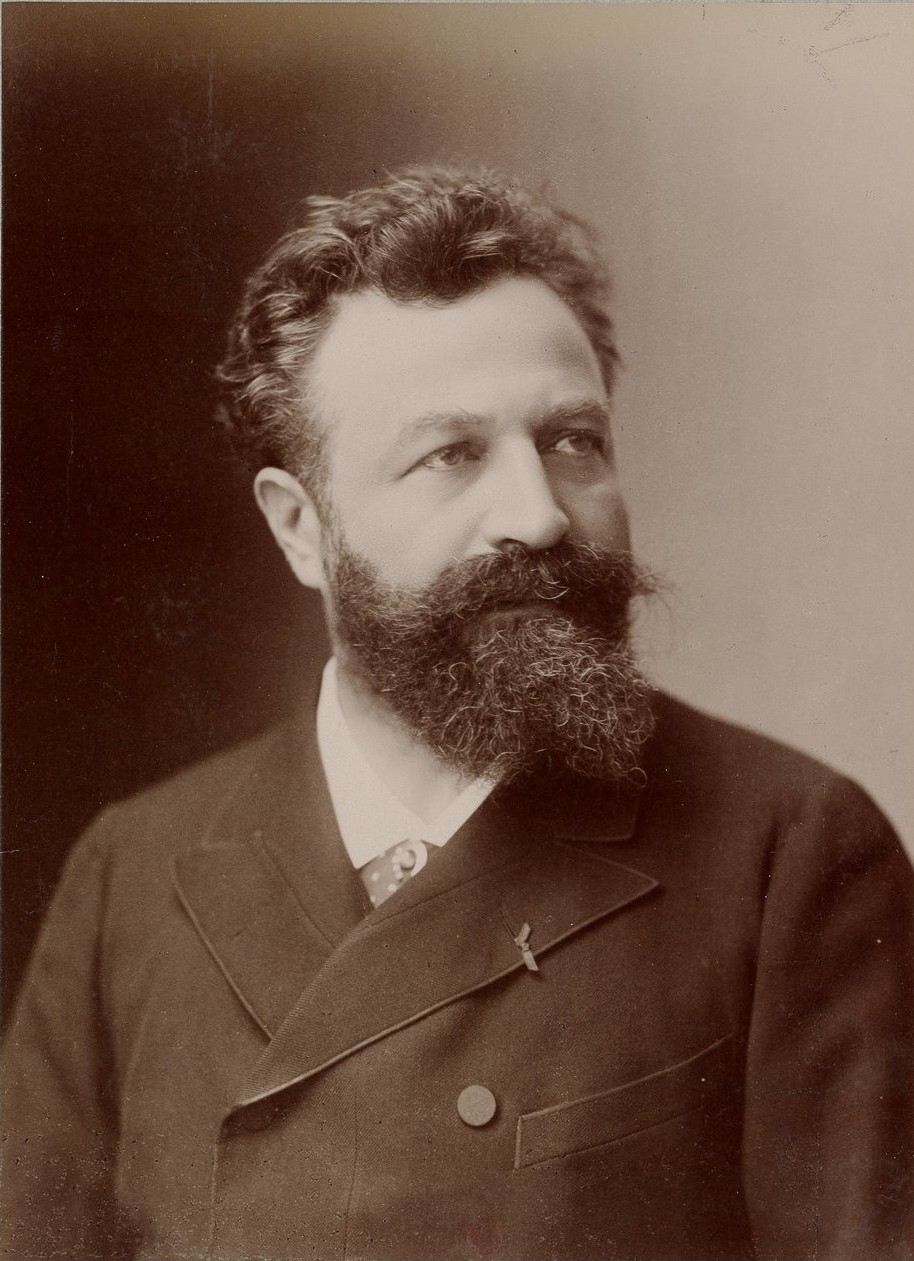
Édouard Colonne

Édouard Juda Colonne (23 July 1838 – 28 March 1910) was a French conductor and violinist, and a champion of the music of Berlioz and other eminent 19th-century composers.

== Life and career ==
Colonne was born in Bordeaux, the son and grandson of musicians of Italian-Jewish descent. From the age of eight, he played flageolet and accordion, and then began violin studies with Baudoin. Starting in 1855, Colonne studied at the Conservatoire in Paris, where he won first prizes in both harmony and violin. For almost a decade (1858–67) he was first violinist at the Opéra in Paris, as well as playing second violin in the Lamoureux Quartet. In 1871 he directed concerts at the Grand-Hôtel and Massenet's music for the staging of Les Érinnyes in 1873.

Also in 1873, Colonne, along with the music publisher Georges Hartmann, founded the "Concert National" at the Odéon Théatre. Two years later, the venue moved to the Théâtre du Châtelet and the name of the enterprise was changed to 'L'Association Artistique du Châtelet'. The Association's performances eventually became known as the Concerts Colonne; apart from the years of Paris's German occupation in World War II, when (because of Colonne's Jewish ancestry) the events were referred to as 'Pierné Concerts' instead, this name continued to be used until the 1960s.

In 1878 Colonne had met Tchaikovsky during the Russian composer's visit to Paris, and, as well as giving the local premiere of his 4th Symphony, remained in contact, which led to 'exchange' concert trips for Colonne in Russia.

Colonne was noted for his interest in Berlioz (then, on the whole, more highly regarded in the English- and German-speaking countries than in France). David Cairns noted in relation to the performance tradition following the death of Berlioz that the "advent of Edouard Colonne was therefore crucial... Berlioz was accepted – as the composer of a single work, at most of two: Faust and the Fantastic Symphony. But the oeuvre was now in good hands". He comments that when the 15-year-old Pierre Monteux joined Colonne's orchestra in 1890 and "learned the music from the inside" this tradition continued. Monteux (first violist and then assistant conductor of the Colonne orchestra) used Colonne's annotated score for his 1931 recording of Berlioz's Symphonie fantastique.

In addition, Colonne stood out for his support of the music of Wagner, Mahler and Saint-Saëns. He introduced the descriptive note into programme booklets.

Another of his significant contributions was in the technological sphere: he was the first conductor of note to make commercial phonograph records, all for the French Pathé company. His earliest recordings were issued on wax phonograph cylinders, none of which is known to survive, but a later group of recordings, made circa 1906 and issued on Pathé discs, has been remastered and reissued on CD. The works range from Beethoven to Widor, and announcements by Colonne are included.

Colonne's second wife was the soprano Elise Vergin. He died in Paris, aged 71.
