= Marie Delna =

French opera singer

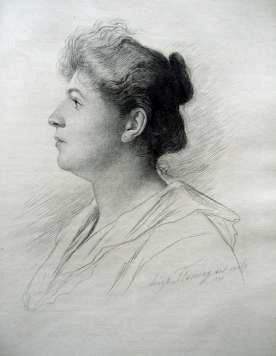
Marie Delna

Marie Delna (Paris, 3 April 1875 - Paris, 24 July 1932) was a French contralto. A major singer in Paris, particularly at the Opéra-Comique, she enjoyed an international career in the 1890s through to the 1910s and left several recordings.

== Life and career ==
Born Marie Ledant to a working-class family in the Marais area of the French capital, she was orphaned aged 15 months, and she and her sister grew up first with her maternal grandmother in Longjumeau. Then from 1881 she lived with her paternal grandparents, who ran the 'Café du Panorama' near Meudon station, while she attended a convent school.

Her grandmother started her with singing lessons and she studied with Rosine Laborde. She began appearing at public auditions and various private concerts in Paris.

She was spotted by Carvalho, director of Opéra-Comique, who suggested her stage name (a rough anagram of her surname). In June 1892, she made a sensational stage debut, just after her 17th birthday, as Didon in Les Troyens à Carthage.

Massenet chose her as his first Charlotte in Werther in Paris, in January 1893, and later that year she created Marceline in Bruneau's L'attaque du moulin. The following April she sang the role of Mistress Quickly in the first French Falstaff, supervised by Verdi, and continued to play the role at the Salle Favart.

She sang Marion in Godard's La Vivandière many times in her career, from its 1895 French premiere at the Opéra-Comique and subsequent revivals there to a production at the Gaîté-Lyrique. In 1896, Delna sang Orphée in the first Opéra-Comique production of the Berlioz-Viardot version of Gluck’s opera, to which she returned in 1900 and 1912.

Delna took part in the first Covent Garden performance of L’attaque du moulin in 1894. Her Italian debut was in 1897 in Milan. In May 1898 she moved for a short while from the Opéra-Comique for the Paris Opéra, where she was Fidès in Le prophète and returned to Berlioz as Cassandre in the Paris premiere of La prise de Troie. She also sang La favorite and Samson et Dalila, as well as creating Ginèvra in Victorin de Joncières's Lancelot.

Back at the Salle Favart in 1900 she sang Carmen for the first time, alongside Adolphe Maréchal and Hector Dufranne. Along with Orphée, Carmen was the role which featured most prominent for the rest of her stage career. April 1901 saw her creating Marianne in Bruneau's L’Ouragan. A revival of Falstaff in honour of Verdi's memory featured her as Quickly and she portrayed Fée Grignotte (the witch) in Hänsel und Gretel. In 1902 she sang Margared for the first time, partnering Léon Beyle and Julie Guiraudon, in the revival of Le roi d'Ys.

In 1903, while taking part as Carmen at the Théâtre de la Monnaie in Brussels, she married a Belgian admirer, the Marquis Prier de Saône, an industrialist, and retired from the stage. She later resumed her career with several concerts then productions at the Théâtre-Lyrique de la Gaîté as La Vivandière, Orphée and in L'attaque du moulin. The following season she sang Fidès and Léonore (La favorite).

Delna made her Metropolitan Opera début as Orfeo conducted by Toscanini, but other appearances were curtailed for various reasons. The next stage of her career included more performances of L’attaque du moulin in 1910, the creation of Tilli in La Lépreuse by Sylvio Lazzari (1912), and further performances at La Monnaie. During her career Delna performed at major houses such as La Monnaie, Covent Garden, La Scala, Teatro Lirico Milan, Metropolitan New York, Opera de Monte-Carlo and the Teatro Regio (Parma).

During the First World War she sang widely in concerts for troops, then in November 1925 appeared in the premiere of Maurin des Maures by Léo Puget (Miss Rabasse) at the Folies-Dramatiques.

Financial problems forced her to move in 1926 to a rented house in Villemomble. She died at the Hopital de la Pitié, and was buried in Thiais cemetery, later being moved to Père Lachaise.

== Discography ==
Delna's first recordings of operatic excerpts were set down in London in 1903 (Le prophète, Carmen), swiftly followed by more in Paris with La Vivandière, Werther, Les Troyens. In 1905 she recorded duets with Albert Alvarez, and in 1907 more solo excerpts, this time extending to Orphée et Eurydice and Samson et Dalila. In New York in 1910 and London 1913 Delna continued a traversal of her main stage roles, completing her discography in Paris in 1918 with songs by Claude Rohand. Despite their age the recordings suggest "...a range of three octaves, a smooth legato delivery, combined with fine diction".
