= Isidore de Lara =

English composer and singer (1858-1935)

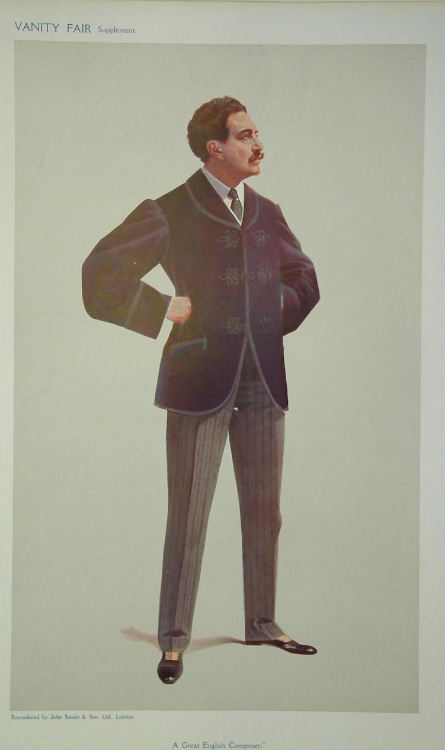
Isidore de Lara, 1908.

Isidore de Lara, born Isidore Cohen (9 August 1858 – 2 September 1935), was an English composer and singer. After studying in Italy and France, he returned to England, where he taught for several years at the Guildhall School of Music and Drama and became a well known singer and composer of art songs. In the early 1880s he began to compose music for the stage, eventually achieving his greatest successes with opera in Monte Carlo from the late 1890s through the outbreak of World War I. His most popular opera, Messaline (1899), enjoyed frequent revivals throughout Europe and in the United States during the first quarter of the 20th century. He returned to London and spent much of the 1920s trying to create a permanent National opera company in England, without much success.

== Biography ==
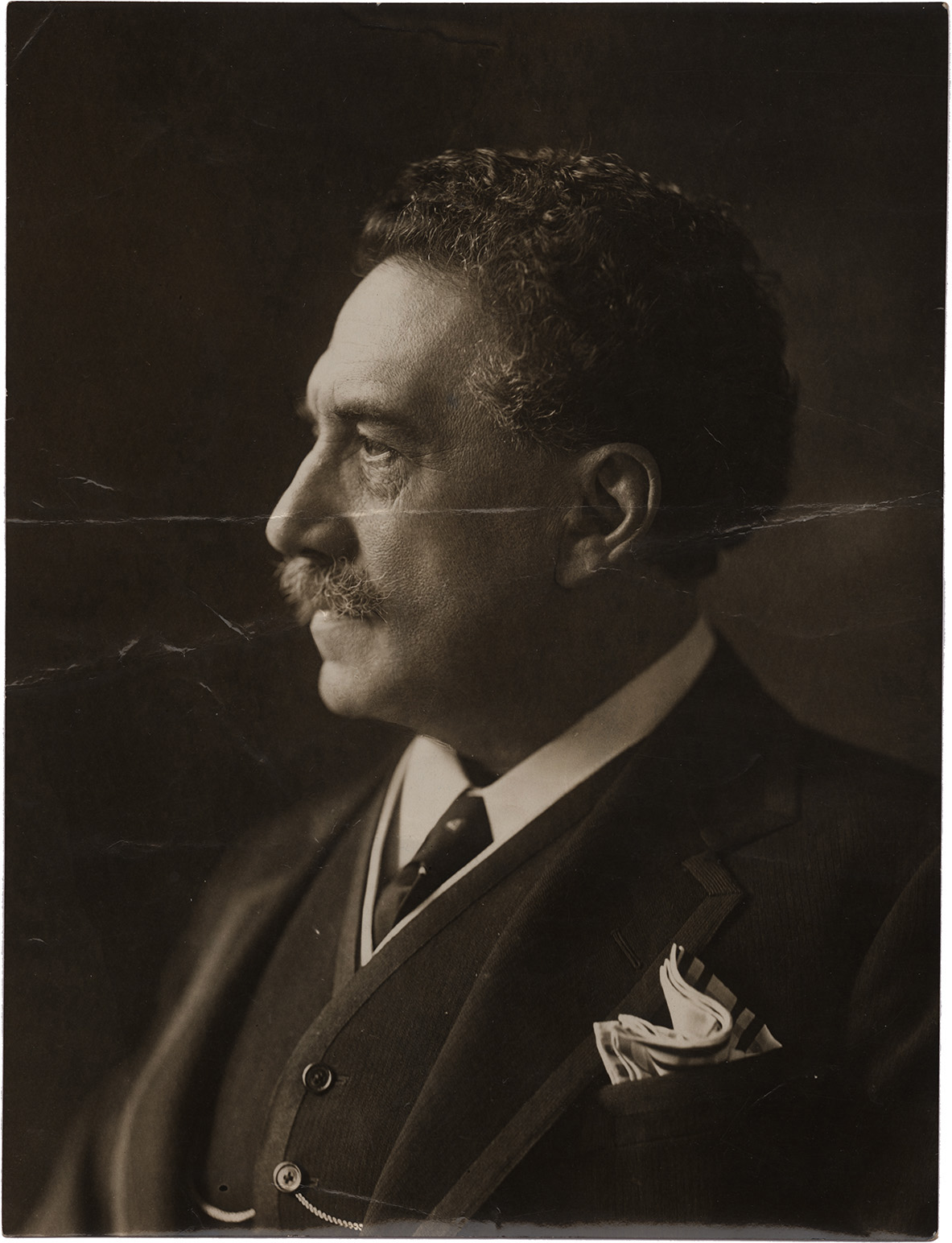
Portrait photograph of Isidore de Lara

Born in London, de Lara went to Milan in 1874 to study composition with Alberto Mazzucato and singing with Francesco Lamperti at the Milan Conservatory. In 1876 he went to Paris to study with Édouard Lalo. The following year he returned to London to take a position as a professor of singing at the Guildhall School of Music and Drama. He became known as a concert singer and a writer of vocal songs, of which his The Garden of Sleep (1877) and After Silent Years (1887) were particularly popular.

In the early 1880s, de Lara began to switch his attention to composing music for the theatre. His first opera, The Royal Word, premiered at the Gaiety Theatre, London on 17 April 1883 with de Lara portraying the role of Charles II of England. This was soon followed by Wrong Notes (1883) and Minna, or The Fall from the Cliff (1886). A few years later the acclaimed French baritone Victor Maurel persuaded him to turn his cantata The Light of Asia, based on the life of Buddha, into an Italian opera, La luce dell'Asia, which was produced at Covent Garden in 1892.

In 1893 de Lara's opera Amy Robsart was given in French at Covent Garden with Emma Calvé. Well received, the work was staged the following year at the Opéra de Monte-Carlo. While in Monte Carlo, De Lara met Princess Alice of Monaco who became a close friend, patron and, eventually, lover.

Under her support, De Lara remained in Monaco and moved into the most successful part of his career. His opera Moïna was produced there in 1897. It was followed in 1899 by his most famous work, Messaline, which featured the presence of the greatest Italian heroic tenor of the era, Francesco Tamagno, in the cast of the premiere performance. Messaline proved very popular and was the inspiration for Henri de Toulouse-Lautrec's painting of the same name. Notably, it was the first opera by an English composer to be mounted at La Scala (in 1901).

With the outbreak of World War I, de Lara returned to London. Concerned for the survival of the arts during this time, he established a fund for the relief of distressed musicians. At the close of the war, he strove to establish an English national opera throughout the 1920s, but was unable to get the financial support needed to maintain a permanent company. He retired to Paris where he died on 2 August 1935.

== Works ==
De Lara was a moderately prolific composer, producing a total of 13 operas, 67 vocal art songs, and a small amount of chamber music. His musical style was highly eclectic, although the influences of Jules Massenet and Camille Saint-Saëns are readily apparent within his operas. Musicologist Nigel Burton wrote, "His style may be said to have developed, but it never really settled down." The somewhat erratic side to his writing was a weakness and a strength. The fluctuating musical vocabulary in his writing enabled him to create any attitude, emotion, or impression at a moment's notice, but at times the musical effects seem out of place or without cause; a criticism also made of Giacomo Meyerbeer. Critics have also commented on de Lara's tendency towards over sentimentality. As one critic said, "at the moments when the music should attempt to rise to dramatic greatness, it degenerates into synthetic posturings." However, de Lara by all accounts had a wonderful musical ear and at his best he is a fine composer. Perhaps de Lara's strongest area was his skill at orchestration which was both tasteful and highly creative at the same time.

=== Selected operas ===
- The Royal Word (1883)
- Wrong Notes (1883)
- Minna, or The Fall from the Cliff (1886)
- La luce dell'Asia (The Light of Asia) (1892, Covent Garden)
- Amy Robsart (1893, Covent Garden)
- Moïna (1897, Monte Carlo)
- Messaline (1899, Monte Carlo)
- Soléa (1907)
- Naïl (abt. 1910)
- Les trois mousquetaires (abt. 1920)
