= Messaline =

1899 opera by Isidore de Lara

- Tragédie lyrique by Isidore de Lara
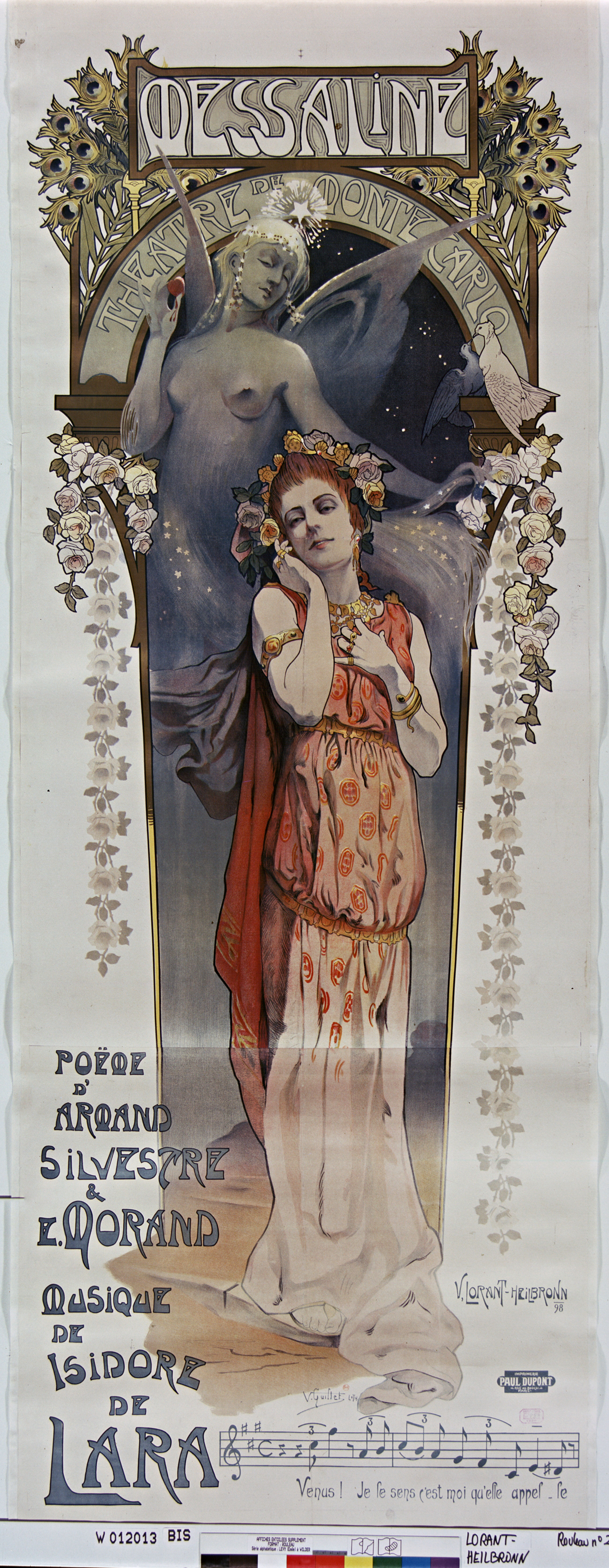
- Poster by Vincent Lorant-Heilbronn
- Librettist: Paul Armand Silvestre; Eugène Morand
- Language: French
- Premiere: 21 March 1899; Opéra de Monte-Carlo

Messaline (Messalina) is an operatic tragédie lyrique in four acts by Isidore de Lara. The librettists were Paul Armand Silvestre and Eugène Morand.

The opera premiered at the Opéra de Monte-Carlo on 21 March 1899 where it was received enthusiastically. Messaline was de Lara's most successful opera and subsequent productions were performed throughout Europe, including the first opera by an Englishman to be mounted at La Scala in 1901. Other notable performances include Covent Garden in 1899, Paris Opéra in 1903, Warsaw in 1904, and Cairo in 1907. The opera made its United States premiere at the Metropolitan Opera on 22 January 1902. The opera remained a regular part of the repertory, particularly in France, until 1943.

== Roles ==
| Role | Voice type | Premiere Cast, 21 March 1899 (Conductor: Leon Jehin) |
|---|---|---|
| Messaline | soprano | Meyrianne Héglon |
| Harès | baritone | Max Bouvet |
| Hélion | tenor | Albert Alvarez |
| Herold | baritone | |
| Kytharödin | soprano | |
| Leuconoë | soprano | |
| Gallus | bass | Léon Melchissédec |
| Myrrhon | baritone | Gabriel Soulacroix |
| Myrtille | baritone | Vinche |
| Tsylla | soprano | |
| Tyndaris | soprano | Jane Leclerc |

== Synopsis ==
Setting: Rome, AD 45

The Empress Messaline loves Harès, a poet and then Hélion, his brother (who is a gladiator) with fatal results.
