= Lev Tseitlin =

Russian violinist

Lev Tseitlin (Russian: Лев Моисеевич Цейтлин; 15 March 1881, Tbilisi - 9 January 1952, Moscow) was a violinist and a professor.

== Biography ==
Tseitlin started to study violin in Tbilisi under Evgeny Kolchin. In 1901 he graduated from Saint Petersburg Conservatory where he studied with Leopold Auer. He then went to study with Eugène Ysaÿe in Brussels, and worked as a concertmaster in Orchestre Collone in Paris before returning to Russia in 1906. There in Moscow he first worked as an orchestra leader in Zimin Opera, and from 1908 till 1917 as a concertmaster in Serge Koussevitzky’s symphony orchestra. From 1918 to 1920 he taught at the Institute of Music and Drama, and from 1920 until the end of his life he was a professor and later a head of the violin departments at the Moscow Conservatory.

It was on Tseitlin’s initiative that Persimfans, the world's first symphony orchestra without a conductor, was formed. Tseitlin carefully selected instrumentalists for the new orchestra. The first desk of the first violins consisted of Tseitlin himself as a concertmaster and Abram Yampolsky as his deputy. The first desk of the second violins was represented by Dmitri Tsyganov (of the Beethoven Quartet) and Konstantin G. Mostras. This orchestra played an important role in Moscow's musical life during the group’s existence from 1922 to 1932. The soloists performed with Persimfans included Sergei Prokofiev, Joseph Szigeti, Vladimir Horowitz and Carlo Zecchi. The orchestra published its own monthly magazine.

In the late-1940s and early-1950s Tseitlin suffered a devastating effect of the Russian antisemitic campaign, when he was stripped of his head of the department status and wasn't given new students for the last few years of his conservatory tenure.

As a teacher, Tseitlin raised a number of famous violinists and violists. His students included Mark Zatulovsky, Rudolf Barshai, Boris Fishman, Avet Ter-Gabrielyan, Boris Belenky, Alexei Gorokhov, Samuil Furer and Boris Goldstein.
