= Xavier Leroux =

French composer

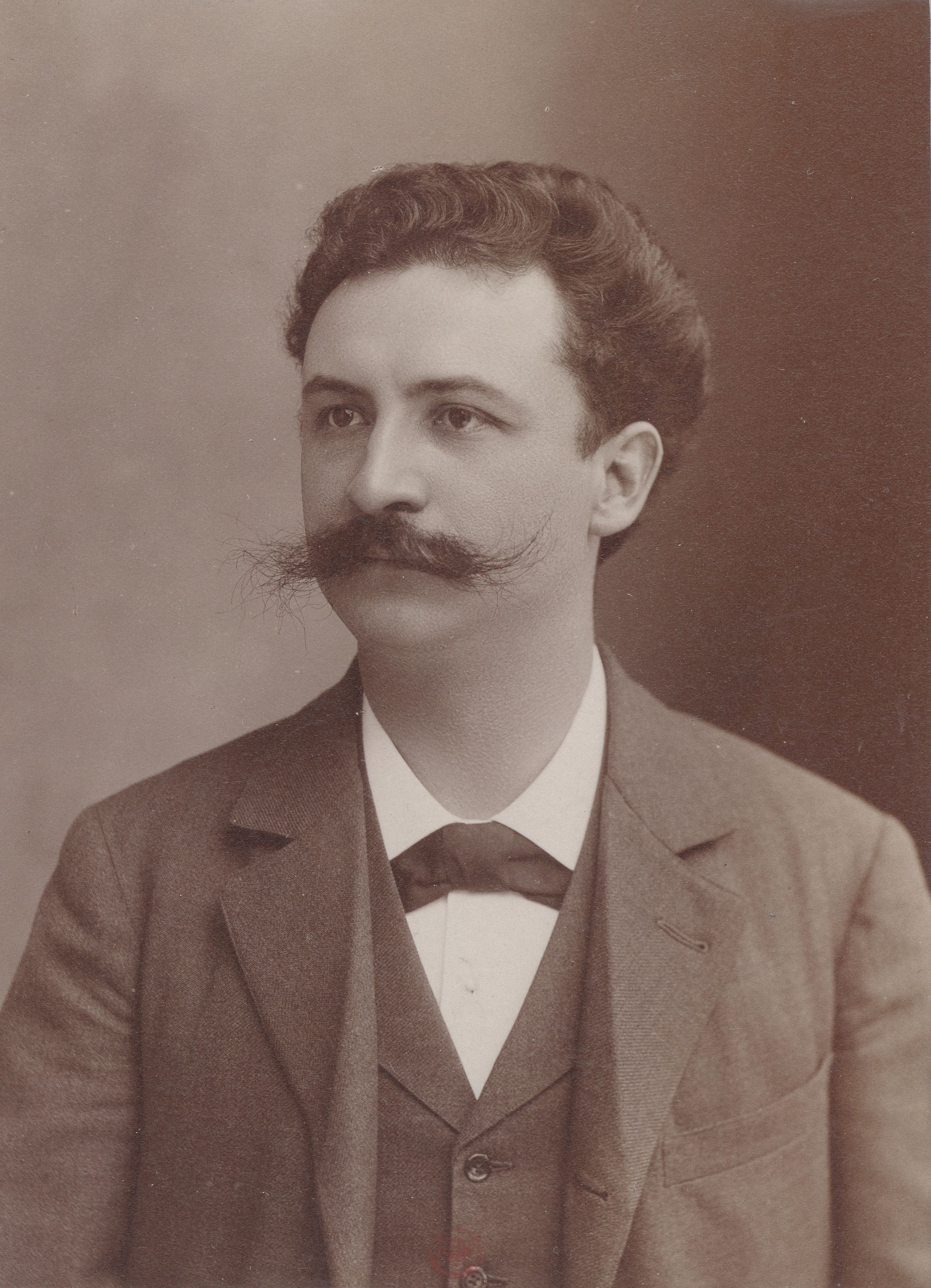
Xavier Leroux by Nadar

Xavier Henry Napoleón Leroux (French pronunciation: [ɡzavje ɑ̃ʁi napɔlɛn ləʁu]; 11 October 1863 – 2 February 1919) was a French composer and a teacher at the Paris Conservatory. He was married to the famous soprano Meyrianne Héglon (1867–1942).

== Life ==
Born in Italy at Velletri, 30 km south-east of Rome, Leroux was the son of a French military bandleader. He studied at the Conservatoire de Paris under Jules Massenet and Théodore Dubois, and won the Prix de Rome in 1885 with the cantata Endymion. From 1896 he taught harmony there. Notable students include Eugène Bigot, Georges Dandelot, Marc Delmas, Roger Désormière, Louis Fourestier, Henri Mulet, Paul Paray, Louis Vuillemin, and Albert Wolff.

Leroux composed various orchestral and choral works, songs, and piano pieces, but he became known above all as a representative of naturalistic French opera. His masterpiece is the opera Le Chemineau, which was staged six times at the Opéra-Comique between 1907 and 1945.

The music critic of Le Monde, Jacques-Emmanuel Fousnaquer, points out that "between 1907 (the year of its creation) and 1945, [Le Chemineau] was performed over a hundred times at the Opéra-Comique, with equal success." It was revived at the Marseille Opera in January 1996, featuring Jean-Philippe Lafont and Martine Surais, directed by Henri Gallois.

Alfredo Casella dedicated his Symphony No. 1 in B minor, Op. 5 to him in 1905.

Leroux was married to the Brussels-born soprano Marie-Antoinette Willemsen, who appeared under the pseudonym Meyrianne Héglon (1867–1942).

== Selected works ==
=== Incidental music ===
- The Persians (Aeschylus)
- Plutus (Aristophanes)

=== Operas ===
- Evangéline (Louis de Gramont) (1895)
- Astarté (Louis de Gramont) (1901)
- La reine Fiammette (1903)
- Vénus et Adonis (Louis de Gramont) (1905)
- William Ratcliff (Louis de Gramont after Heinrich Heine) (1906)
- Le Chemineau (1907)
- Théodora (1907)
- Le Carillonneur (1913)
- La Fille de Figaro (1914)
- Les cadeaux de Noël (1915)
- 1814 (1918)
- Nausithoé (1920)
- La Plus forte (1924)
- L'Ingénu (1931)

=== Others ===
- Hymne (1914)
