= Polar Bear =

The polar bear is a large Arctic animal.

Polar Bear may also refer to:

== Film and stage ==
- The Polar Bear, a 1998 German action film
- Polar Bears (film), a 2008 television mockumentary
- Polar Bears (play), 2010, by Mark Haddon
- Polar Bears: A Summer Odyssey, a 2012 documentary
- Polar Bear (film), a 2022 documentary

== Music ==
=== Groups and labels ===
- Polar Bear (American band), a rock band from Los Angeles
- Polar Bear (British band), a jazz band
- Polar Bears (band), a rock band from northern California
- Snow Patrol or Polarbear, a Scottish alternative rock band

=== Albums ===
- Polar Bear (EP), a 1996 EP by the American band Polar Bear
- Polar Bear (album), a 2008 album by the British jazz band Polar Bear

=== Songs ===
- "Polar Bear", a 1990 song by Ride from Nowhere
- "Polar Bear", a song by Smile, later recorded by Queen
- "Polar Bear", a 2004 song by Therapy? from Never Apologise Never Explain

== Sports ==
- Bowdoin Polar Bears, at Bowdoin College, Maine, US
- Edese Zwem- & Poloclub Polar Bears, a Netherlands water polo team
- Eisbären Bremerhaven, (English: Polar Bears Bremerhaven), a German basketball team
- Pete Alonso, American baseball player, nicknamed Polar Bear

== United States military ==
- Polar BEAR, a 1986 space mission
- Polar Bear Expedition, a troop contingent, 1918–19
- 31st Infantry Regiment (United States), or The Polar Bears
- 49th (West Riding) Infantry Division, or The Polar Bears
- Polar Bear Memorial, a commemorative bear sculpture at White Chapel Memorial Cemetery, Troy, Michigan

== Vehicles ==
- Polar Bear (steam locomotive), a Bagnall locomotive built in 1905 for the Groudle Glen Railway
- Polar Bear (battery-electric locomotive), a Wingrove & Rogers locomotive built in 1921 for the Groudle Glen Railway
- Polar Bear (schooner), a ship purchased for the Canadian Arctic Expedition, 1913–1916

== Other uses ==
- Polar Bear (furniture), a 1940s sofa and armchair
- POLARBEAR, a CMB polarimetry experiment in the Atacama Desert
- Polar-bearing or knockout game, an assault in which, one or more assailants attempt to knock out an unsuspecting victim
- Polar Bear Pass, a pass on Bathurst Island, Nunavut, Canada
- Polar Bear, a nickname for Hugh Rowland in Ice Road Truckers
- Polar Bear, a white-bearded or gray-bearded member of the Bear community in gay culture

== See also ==
- HMS Protector (A173) or Polarbjørn, a research ship and icebreaker
- L'Ours Blanc, a marble sculpture of a polar bear by François Pompon
- Polar bear plunge, a type of fundraiser
