= Marguerite de Saint-Marceaux =

French salonnière

Madame Marguerite de Saint-Marceaux
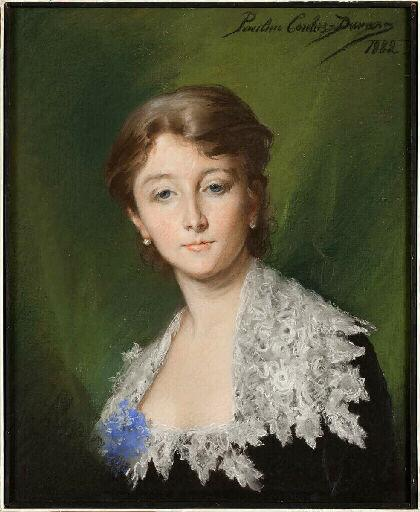
- 1882 portrait of Marguerite by Pauline Croizette
- Born: Lucie Frederica Marguerite Jourdain; 9 May 1850; Louviers, Normandy, France
- Died: 23 February 1930 (aged 79); Paris, France
- Resting place: Cuy-Saint-Fiacre
- Occupations: salonnière, singer, pianist, arts patron, diarist
- Spouse(s): Eugène Baugnies; René de Saint-Marceaux
- Children: 3

Lucie Frederica Marguerite "Meg" de Paul de Saint-Marceaux (née Jourdain; 9 May 1850 – 23 February 1930), formerly Baugnies, was a French salonnière, arts patron, diarist, and amateur pianist and opera singer. She was celebrated for her salons, where she hosted intellectual and artistic masters including Marcel Proust, Colette, Giovanni Boldini, Maurice Ravel, Isadora Duncan, and Gabriel Fauré. A number of musical works were premiered at her salons, including excerpts of Claude Debussy's Pelléas et Mélisande and Prélude à l'après-midi d'un faune and Fauré's Mandoline from Cinq mélodies "de Venise". Fauré, who was a close friend of de Saint-Marceaux, dedicated two of his works, Trois mélodies, Op. 7 and Nocturne No. 1 in E♭ minor, Op. 33/1, to her. In 1903, she was hired by Alfred Cortot to sing in the choir for Richard Wagner's Parsifal at the Société des Concerts.

== Early life ==
Marguerite de Saint-Marceaux was born Lucie Frederica Marguerite Jourdain on 9 May 1850 in Louviers, into a prominent family of drapers. Her father was Frédéric-Joseph Jourdain. She was the half-sister of the painter Roger Joseph Jourdain. De Saint-Marceaux received an extensive musical education from Antoine François Marmontel and Romain Bussine, among others.

== Marriages ==
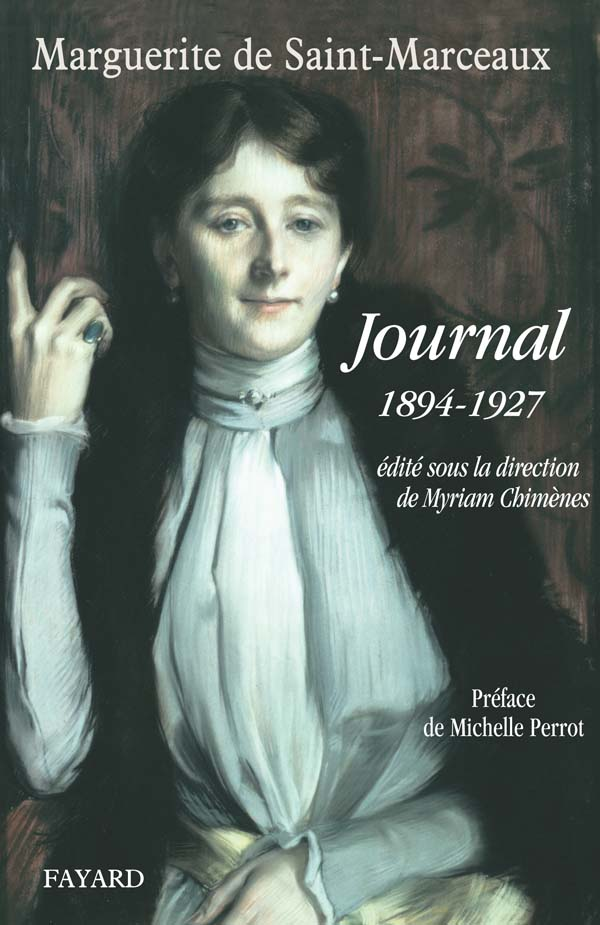
Journal of Madame de Saint-Marceaux, portrait by Jacques-Émile Blanche

As a young woman, de Saint-Marceaux was courted by the composer Camille Saint-Saëns, who asked for her hand in marriage, but her family demanded she refuse him due to his rather Bohemian situation.

She was introduced to the visual arts scene in the 1860s by her half-brother and, in 1870, she married the painter Eugène Baugnies. She gave birth to three sons with Baugnies: Georges, Jacques, and Jean. In 1875, the architect Jules Février completed the construction of the Baugnies' mansion at 100 Boulevard Malesherbes, near Parc Monceau in the 8th arrondissement of Paris.

Upon the death of her husband, de Saint-Marceaux inherited a large fortune. In 1892, she married the sculptor Charles René de Paul de Saint-Marceaux. Her second husband's family were part of the French nobility descended from the Lords of Saint-Marceaux. Her husband's grandfather, Augustin de Saint-Marceaux, served as mayor of Reims. Her husband adopted her three sons, who then took on the surname "Baugnies de Paul de Saint-Marceaux".

== Salons and artistic patronages ==
De Saint-Marceaux became a celebrated salonnière in the 1880s up until the outbreak of World War I, hosting musical and artistic salons at her Malesherbes mansion, where she invited painters, writers, and musicians to mingle with aristocrats and other members of the Parisian upper class. Her salons, considered very informal and Bohemian, were on Friday evenings and full evening dress was prohibited. She also hosted Les gens du monde, or fashionable people including politicians and diplomats, at formal dinners on Thursdays. Her salons were frequented by Colette, Henry Gauthier-Villars, Marcel Proust, Alfred Cortot, Jeanne de Montagnac, Maximilian von Jaunez, Florent Schmitt, Henry Février, Jacques Février, André Messager, Giovanni Boldini, Maurice Ravel, Claude Debussy, Reynaldo Hahn, Gabriel Fauré, Georges Clairin, Charles Koechlin, and Jacques-Émile Blanche. Her salons were described in the correspondence and writings of various attendees including Fauré, Ravel, Schmitt, Koechlin, Messager, Hahn, Cortot, Proust, Colette, and Gauthier-Villars.

Colette wrote about de Saint-Marceaux's salons,

"The gatherings at the Hôtel Saint-Marceaux were more than just a social curiosity — they were a reward granted to the devout lovers of music, a kind of elevated diversion, a haven of artistic intimacy. A dinner — always excellent — preceded these evenings, during which the hostess maintained an atmosphere of controlled freedom. She required no one to listen — yet silenced even the faintest whisper. No one thought it odd that Monsieur de Saint-Marceaux remained absorbed in his reading, that the sons of the household withdrew upstairs, that painters like Clairin and Billotte took refuge in painterly quarrels, or that Gabriel Fauré preferred, rather than listening to the music, the pleasure of sketching — in just a few strokes —the portrait of the tall, bearded Koechlin, or of Henri Février, Jacques’s father. Sometimes, the group of musicians would fall upon old scores, playing and singing with soul —reviving Loïsa Puget, rummaging through a repertoire from 1840 haunted by madmen on the moor, Breton brides with their elbows resting on the jetty, young girls intoxicated by the waltz… Often, side by side on the bench of one of the pianos, Fauré and André Messager improvised together at four hands, sparring with sudden modulations and ventures beyond the key. They both loved this game, during which they’d exchange duelist-like jabs: “Parry this one! And that — saw it coming?” “Go on, Keep at it, I’ll catch you again!” Fauré, a dusky emir, shook his silver crest, smiled at the traps — then redoubled them. A playful quadrille for four hands, where the leitmotifs of Wagner’s Ring Cycle came together, often served as a whimsical curfew bell. It was in that sonorous place — sensitive to reverence, jealous of its prerogatives but capable of gentleness — that I first met Maurice Ravel."

De Saint-Marceaux was also fond of writers, particularly playwrights, and invited many to her salons. Frequently in attendance were Édouard Bourdet, Robert de Flers, Abel Hermant, Paul Hervieu, Henri Lavedan, Jules Lemaître, and Victorien Sardou. She also hosted journalists and critics including André Beaunier, Gaston Calmette, Louis Gillet, Arthur Meyer, and Pierre Lalo.

In 1901, she hosted Isadora Duncan at a salon, who later performed at de Saint-Marceaux's son Jean's wedding. Some of her salons were hosted at her country estate in Cuy-Saint-Fiacre, which she inherited from her first husband's parents.

=== Musical patronages ===
De Saint-Marceaux was patroness to numerous composers, some affiliated with the Paris Opera, including Isaac Albeniz, Pierre de Bréville, Ernest Chausson, Paul Dukas, Pablo Casals, Manuel de Falla, Vincent d'Indy, Giacomo Puccini, Francis Poulenc, Albert Roussel, Gustave Samazeuilh, Camille Saint-Saëns, Déodat de Séverac.

Colette and Ravel met at one of de Saint-Marceaux's salons, which led to their collaboration on L'enfant et les sortilèges. Ravel, who was a frequent guest of the salon, played private performances of his works for de Saint-Marceaux including Trio avec piano, Ma mère l'Oye, L'heure espagnole, Miroirs, and Sonatine. Debussy and Messager debuted excerpts of the opera Pelléas et Mélisande at one salon. In 1894, Debussy debuted his symphonic poem Prélude à l'après-midi d'un faune at one of her salons.

Fauré dedicated two of his works, Trois mélodies, Op. 7 and Nocturne No. 1 in E♭ minor, Op. 33/1, to de Saint-Marceaux. She introduced Fauré to his future wife, Marie Frémiet, the daughter of sculptor Emmanuel Frémiet, at one of her salons. On 21 June 1891, he premiered Mandoline from Cinq mélodies "de Venise" at her salon.

Alfred Cortot, who introduced de Saint-Marceaux to the music of Richard Wagner, hired her to sing in the choir for Parsifal in 1903.

In 1900, she hired the violinist Jacques Thibaud, a new graduate from the Conservatoire de Paris, to play at one of her salons. She noted the experience in her diary, writing:

"Thibaud with his quartet plays at my house the 2nd quartet of Fauré and that of Saint-Saëns, and also the piano and violin sonata [by Fauré]. Exquisite evening. It costs me 200 francs, it is worth 1000."

=== Artistic patronages ===
Having been introduced to the world of visual arts by her half-brother, de Saint-Marceaux remained a patroness of painters and sculptors alike after the death of her first husband, and visual artists frequented her salon. She was known to financially support artists and attended their exhibitions. These artists included Jacques-Émile Blanche, Giovanni Boldini, Carolus-Duran, Georges Clairin, Édouard Detaille, Guillaume Dubufe, Henri Gervex, Paul Landowski, Paul Mathey, Madeleine Lemaire, Antonin Mercié, and François Pompon. Through her artistic connections, she was introduced to Claude Monet, who received her at his home in Giverny.

== Later life and death ==
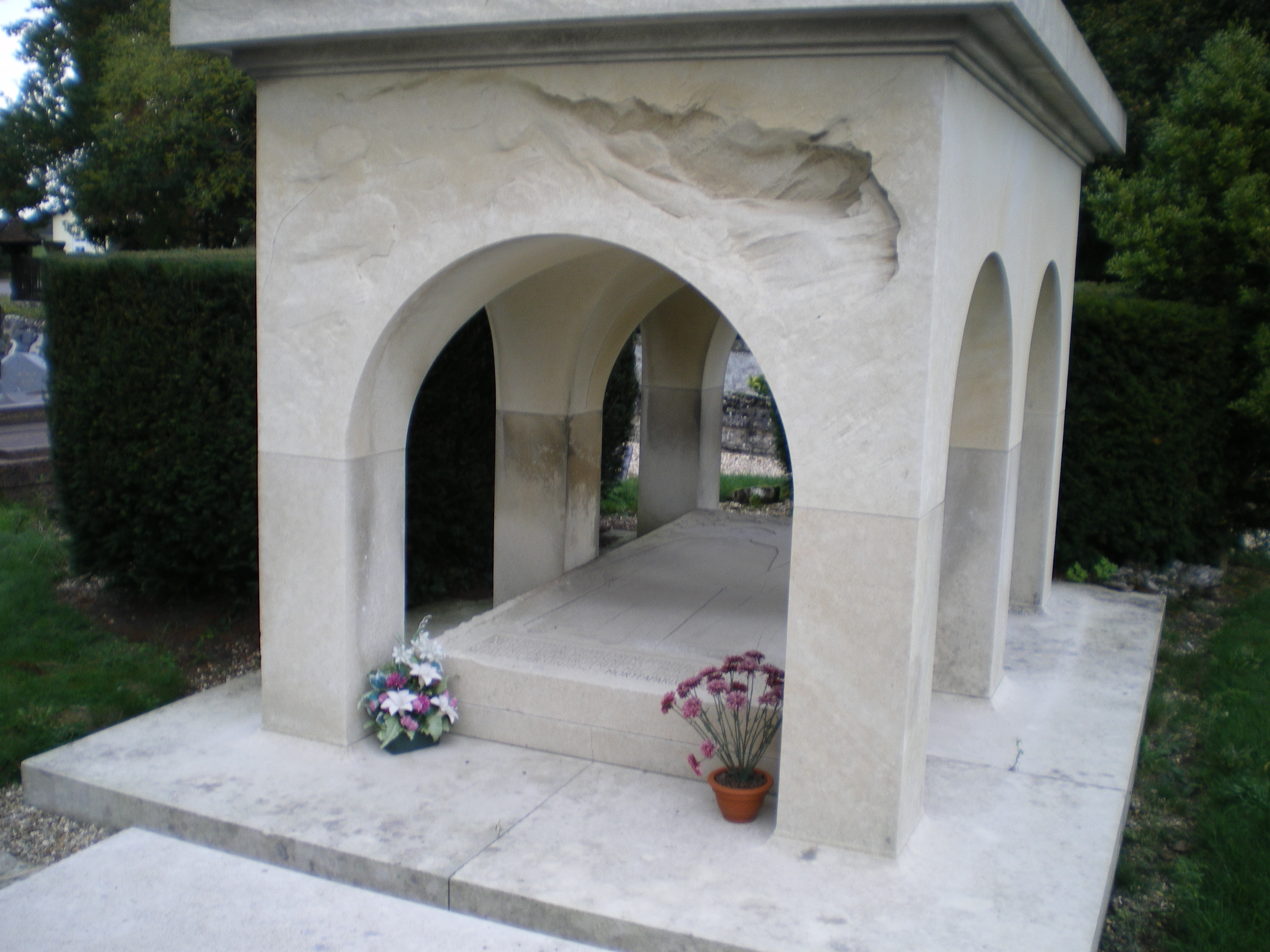
Tomb of Monsieur and Madame de Saint-Marceaux in Cuy-Saint-Fiacre

De Saint-Marceaux kept a diary, until 1927, where she documented her experiences in Parisian society.

She died on 23 February 1930, aged 79, in the 17th arrondissement of Paris.
