= Duez =

Duez is a surname of French origin. Notable people with the surname include:

- Ernest Ange Duez (1843–1896), French painter
- Henri Duez (1937–2025), French cyclist
- Marc Duez (born 1957), Belgian racing and rally driver
