= Paul Mathey =

French draughtsperson and painter (1844–1929)

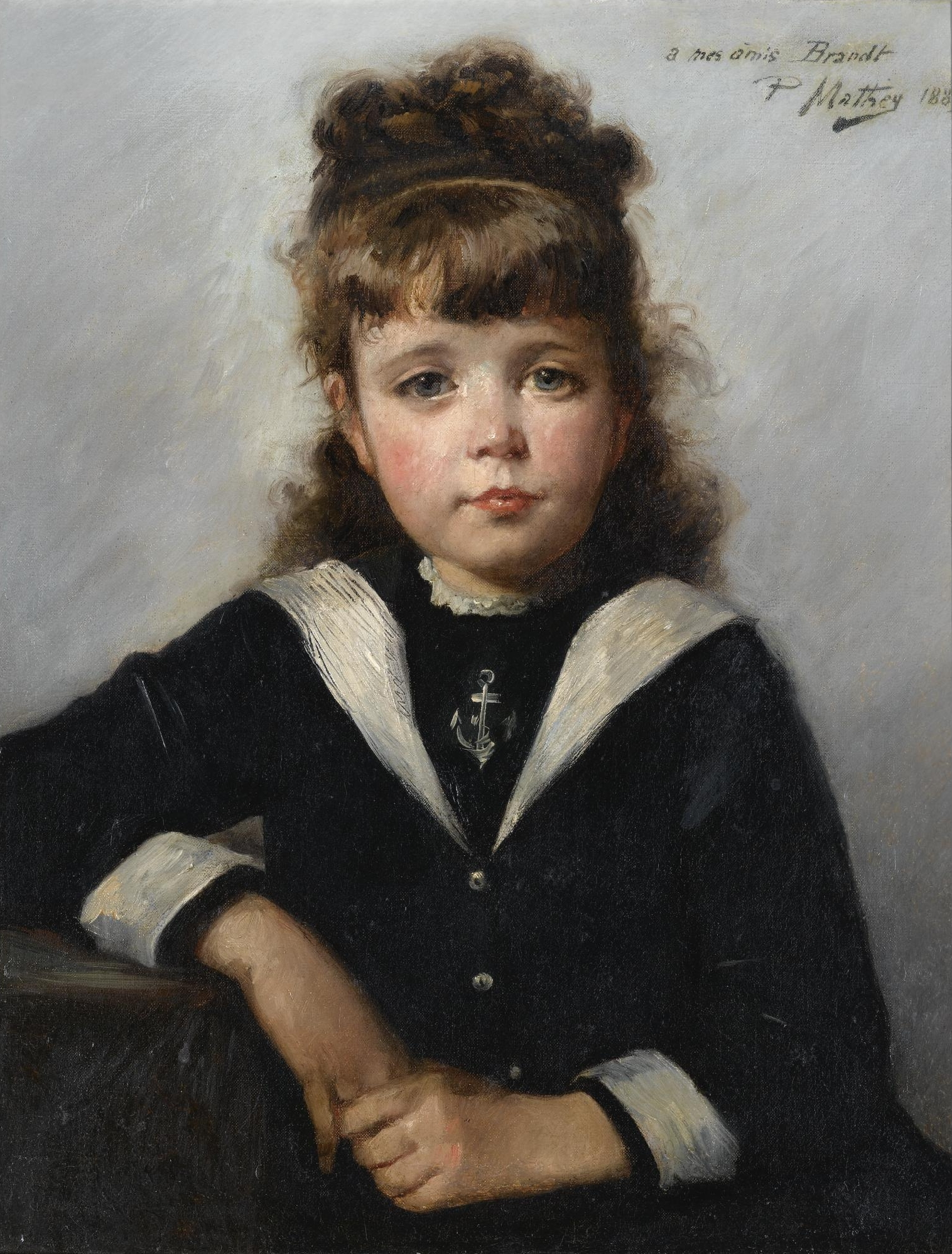
Girl as a sailor

Paul Victor Mathey (14 November 1844 – 24 November 1929) was a French painter and engraver.

== Biography ==
Born in Paris, the son of a restorer, Mathey learned his art at the École nationale supérieure des Beaux-Arts of Paris in painters Léon Cogniet's, Isidore Pils's and Alexis-Joseph Mazerolle's workshops. He began to exhibit at the Salon de Paris in 1868, and became a valued and recognized portrait painter. He has several times portrayed artists from his entourage in their studios.

Especially a portrait painter, Mathey did not, however, refrain from landscape, seascapes, lived scenes or decoration. In his forty-fifth year, at the time of the struggle between reproducers and originals, he had the idea of starting engraving. The Comité des Artistes français, of which he was no longer a member, contested the title of engravers to those who did not work on the work of others. They wanted to exclude them from the Salon, and at least from the rewards. Mathey opened Maxime Lalanne's Traité de gravure à l'eau-forte, took the technical information he needed, fetched a sketch from his notebooks and engraved it. It was a portrait of his father, whom he had drawn about ten years earlier.

His work has been crowned several times. He was presented with a 3rd class medal at the 1876 Salon, a 2nd class medal at the 1885 Salon, and a gold medal at the Exposition Universelle (1889). Finally, he was decorated with the Legion of Honour, 29 October 1889.

Mathey died in the 7th arrondissement of Paris at age 85.

== Works in public collections ==
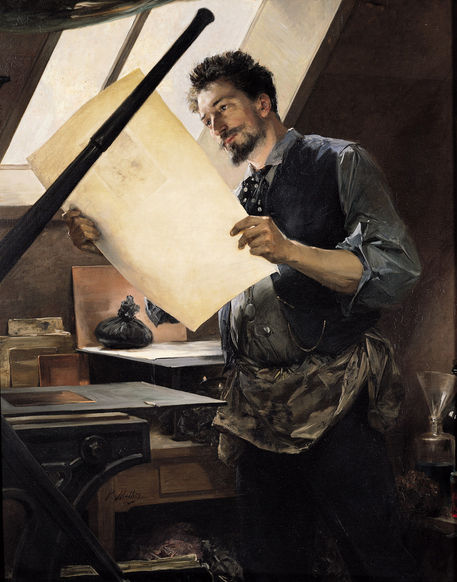
Félicien Rops in his workshop (c. 1888), Palace of Versailles.

- Brest, Musée des beaux-arts de Brest:
  - Portrait du peintre Alfred Rubé, décorateur de l'Opéra, oil on canvas.
  - Portrait de Mme Paul Mathey, oil on canvas.
  - Portrait de Mlle Marthe Mathey au petit chien, oil on canvas.
  - Le Mélomane, portrait du père de l'artiste, oil on canvas.
  - Portrait du frère Joseph, oil on canvas.
- Évreux, Musée d'Évreux: Bord de mer, drawing.
- Gray, Musée Baron-Martin
  - La Plage, oil on wood, (49 x 65 cm)
  - Portrait de mademoiselle Legout-Gérard, oil on canvas, last quarter of the 19th century, (35 x 24,5 cm).
- Le Havre, Museum of modern art André Malraux: Un Pré - Baie de Concarneau, oil on canvas.
- Paris:
  - Département des arts graphiques du musée du Louvre: an album of about a hundred sketches.
  - Musée d'Orsay:
    - Enfant et femme dans un intérieur, oil on canvas
    - Fernande Mathey sur la plage, oil on canvas
    - Pierre Mathey, father of the artist, oil on canvas
- Versailles, Musée de l'Histoire de France:
  - Félicien Rops in his workshop, oil on canvas
  - René de Saint-Marceaux, oil on canvas.

== Selected works ==
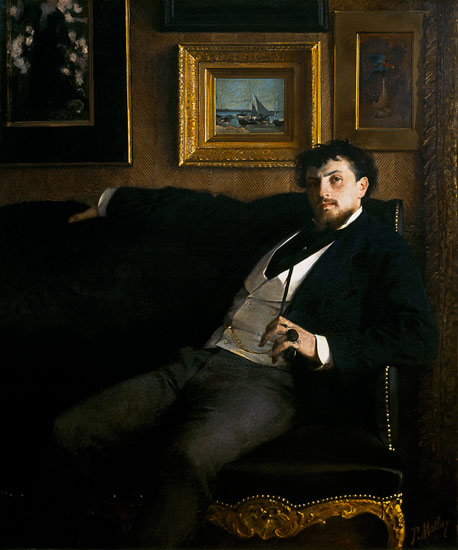
Portrait of Ernest Ange Duez (1876), Musée des beaux-arts d'Arras.

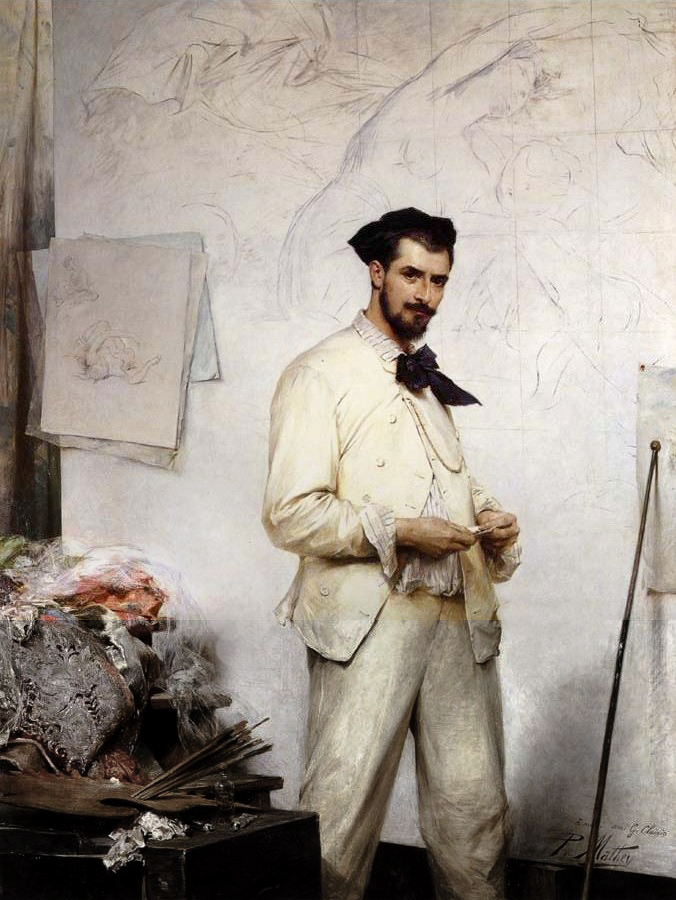
Portrait of painter Georges Clairin, Musée des Augustins d'Hazebrouck.

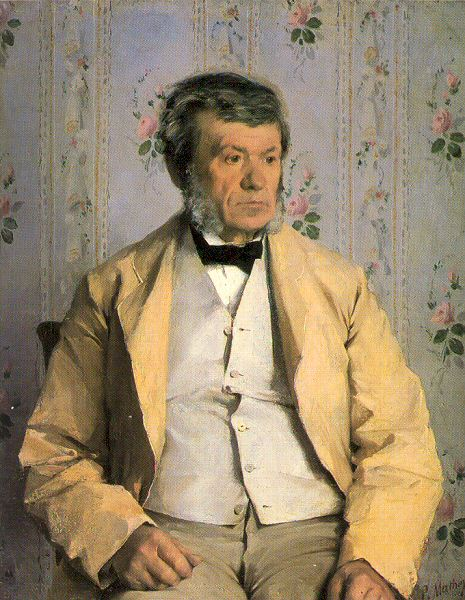
Portrait of Pierre Mathey (before 1887), Paris, Musée d'Orsay.

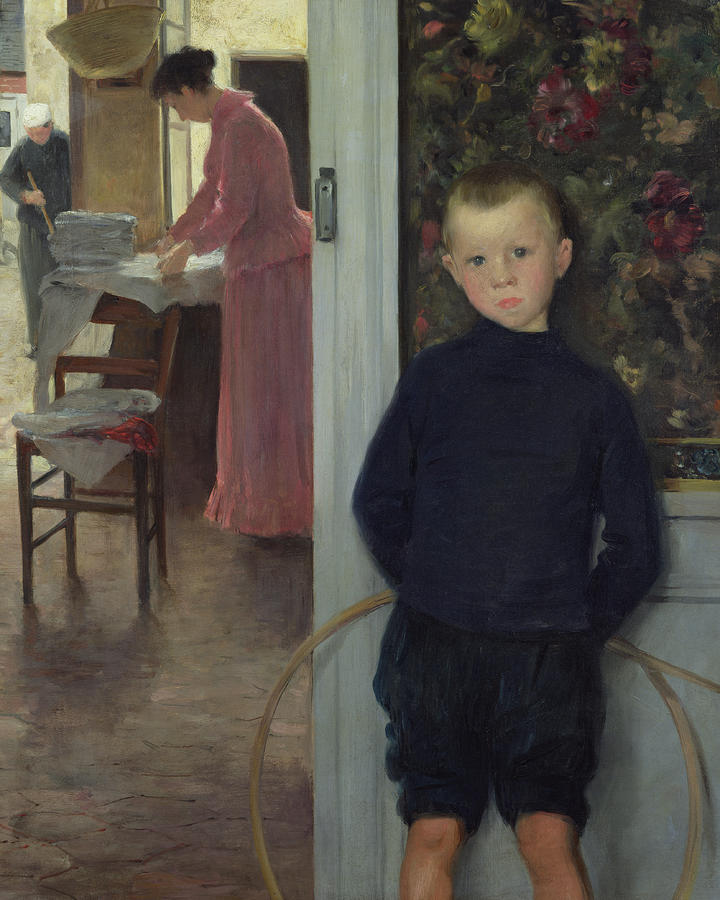
Enfant et femme dans un intérieur (circa 1890), Paris, Musée d'Orsay.

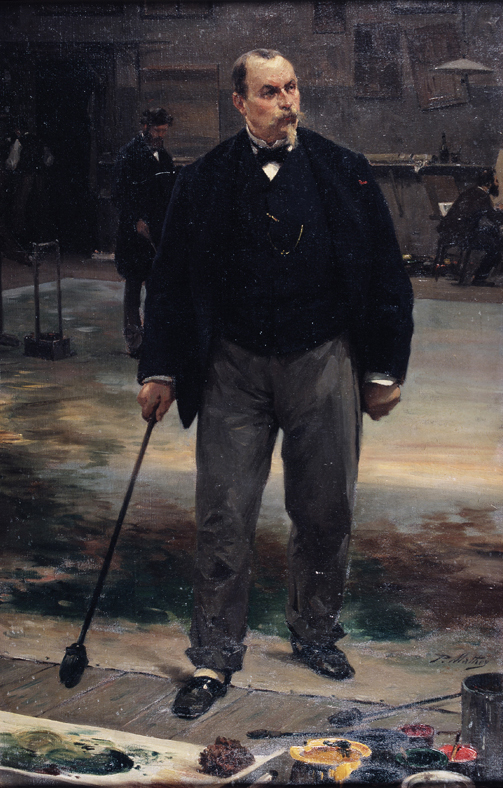
Portrait of the painter Auguste Alfred Rubé, decorator of the Palais Garnier, Musée des beaux-arts de Brest.
