= Emiu =

Iñupiaq explorer (1893–1918)

Emiu, or Split-the-Wind (1893 – November 23, 1918), was an Iñupiaq Alaska Native, Arctic explorer and musher who guided the Canadian Arctic Expedition, 1913–1916. According to contemporary accounts, Emiu was the member of the expedition who theorized that by preparing and cooking the expedition's rawhide sled lacings, they might have food to survive the expedition. His theory worked, and the expedition reached Banks Island, where they were rescued. Vilhjalmur Stefansson, coordinator of the expedition, paid Emiu $6,500 at the time for his expertise.

Emiu, said by contemporary sources to have grown up in or near Nome, Alaska, worked as a cabin boy aboard the schooner Polar Bear at the time of its purchase by Stefansson for the expedition. Emiu earned the nickname "Split-the-Wind" during the Canadian Arctic Expedition for his repeated sprints ahead of the dog teams. While contemporary sources said Emiu claimed to have won the All-Alaska Sweepstakes, the race's history shows he did not. Emiu worked for Stefansson through 1918 and traveled Seattle for a period. That year, Emiu returned to Nome, his hometown, where he died of the Spanish flu on November 23, 1918.
