= Cuy-Saint-Fiacre =

- Commune
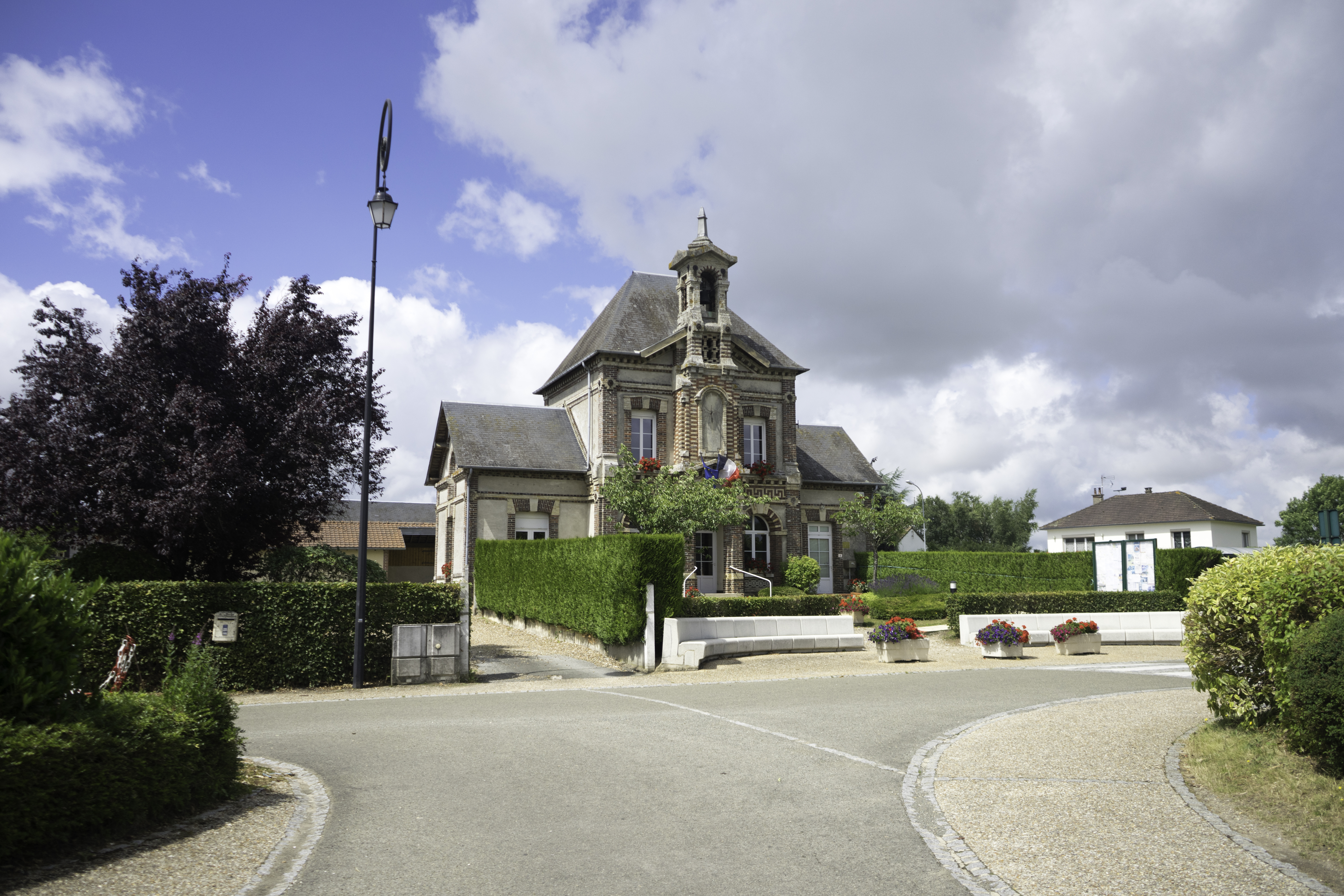
- The town hall in Cuy-Saint-Fiacre
- Location of Cuy-Saint-Fiacre
- Location within France Location within Normandy
- Coordinates: 49°30′48″N 1°41′55″E
- Country: France
- Region: Normandy
- Department: Seine-Maritime
- Arrondissement: Dieppe
- Canton: Gournay-en-Bray
- Intercommunality: CC 4 rivières

Government
  - Mayor (2026–32): Sabine Dieutre
- Area^{1}: 9.63 km^{2} (3.72 sq mi)
- Elevation: 135 m (443 ft)
- Highest elevation: 160 m (520 ft)
- Lowest elevation: 93 m (305 ft)
- Population (2023): 625
  - Density: 64.9/km^{2} (168/sq mi)
- Time zone: UTC+01:00 (CET)
  - Summer (DST): UTC+02:00 (CEST)
- INSEE/Postal code: 76208 /76220
- ^{1} French Land Register data, which excludes lakes, ponds, glaciers > 1 km^{2} (0.386 sq mi or 247 acres) and river estuaries.

Cuy-Saint-Fiacre (French pronunciation: [kɥi sɛ̃ fjakʁ]) is a commune in the Seine-Maritime department in the Normandy region in north-western France.

== Geography ==
A farming village situated by the banks of the river Epte in the Pays de Bray, some 40 miles (64 km) east of Dieppe, at the junction of the D57, D916 and the D16 roads.

== Population ==
Historical population
| Year | Pop. | ±% p.a. |
|---|---|---|
| 1968 | 381 | — |
| 1975 | 352 | −1.12% |
| 1982 | 436 | +3.10% |
| 1990 | 535 | +2.59% |
| 1999 | 531 | −0.08% |
| 2007 | 631 | +2.18% |
| 2012 | 636 | +0.16% |
| 2017 | 659 | +0.71% |
| 2023 | 625 | −0.88% |
Source: INSEE

== Places of interest ==
- The war memorial, designed by François Pompon.
- The church of St. Martin, dating from the twelfth century.
- Remains of a monastery and chateau, both now parts of farms.
- A sixteenth-century stone cross.

== See also ==
- Communes of the Seine-Maritime department
