= Cinq Mélodies "de Venise" =

Song cycle composed by Gabriel Fauré

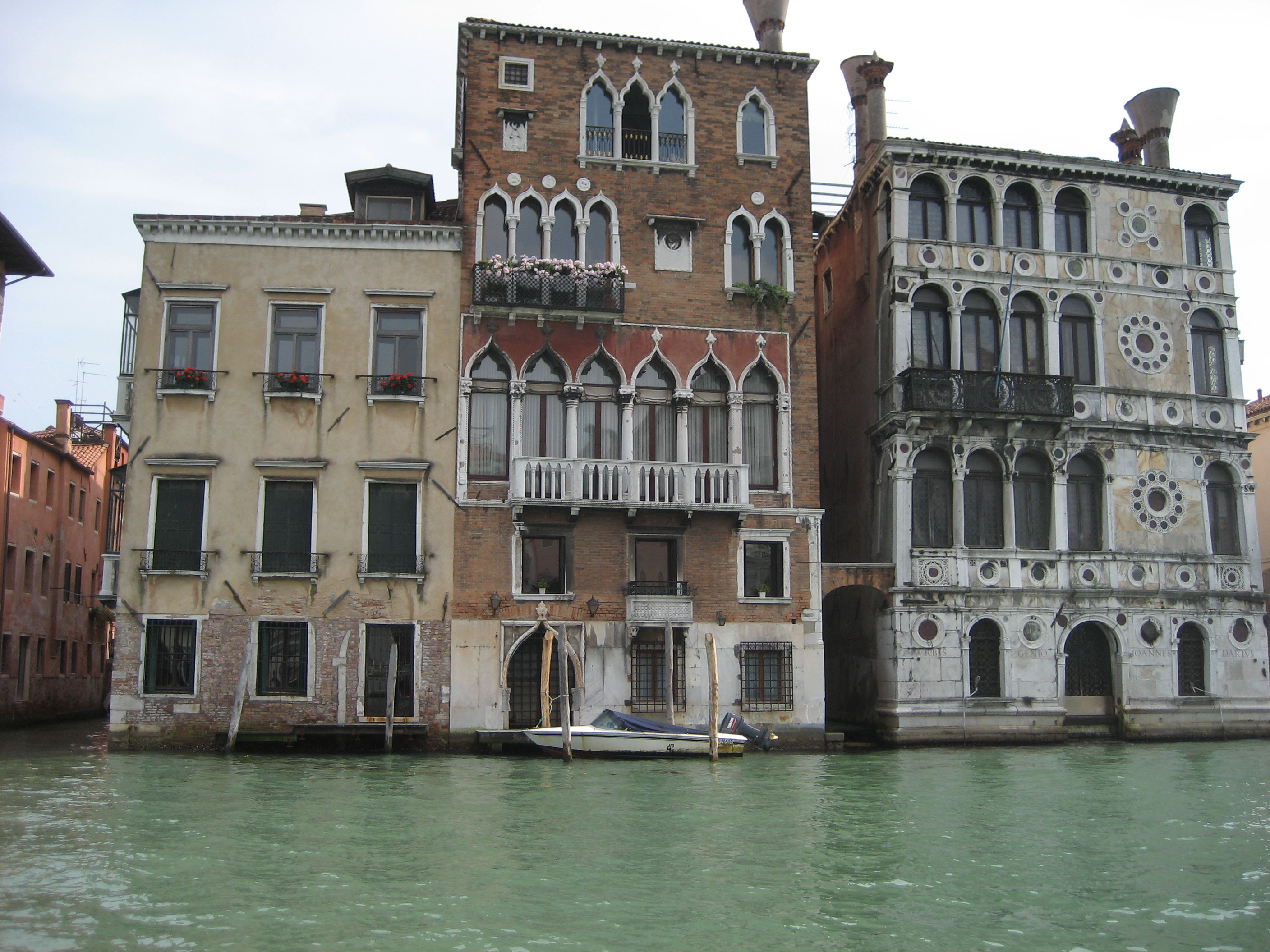
Palazzo Barbaro-Wolkoff (centre), Venice, where Fauré stayed in 1891

Cinq Mélodies "de Venise", Op. 58, is a song cycle by Gabriel Fauré, of five mélodies for voice and piano. Composed in 1891, the cycle is based on five poems by Paul Verlaine, from the collections Fêtes galantes and Romances sans paroles. According to Fauré himself, the song cycle contains a number of musical themes which recur from song to song. He used a similar technique for his later song cycle La Bonne Chanson, which was also based on Verlaine's poetry.

== Composition ==
Fauré composed the first song, "Mandoline", in May 1891 in Venice. He was staying in the Palazzo Volkoff (or Wolkoff) on the Grand Canal, as a guest of Winnaretta Singer, the future Princess de Polignac. Among Singer's other guests were the painter Ernest Ange Duez and his wife Amélie. She was a singer, and entertained the group with Fauré's new composition.

Only "Mandoline" and part of "En sourdine" were composed in Venice. The idea of creating a cycle seems to have come to Fauré only after his return to Paris on 20 June. The rest of the songs were completed in Paris by September 1891. The cycle was published by Hamelle that year, dedicated to Singer. It was published in England in 1896 by Metzler, with an English translation by Adela Maddison.

Fauré wrote to Singer in September 1891 that he believed that with this song cycle he had created a new form, whereby the return of the themes of the other songs in the final one, "C'est l'extase", made the songs into a kind of suite.

== Settings ==
Fauré's settings of Verlaine's poems are as follows:

1. "Mandoline" (from Fêtes galantes)
2. "En sourdine" (from Fêtes galantes)
3. "Green" (from Romances sans paroles)
4. "À Clymène" (from Fêtes galantes)
5. "C'est l'extase" (from Romances sans paroles)

== Premieres ==
"Mandoline" was premiered at the salon of Marguerite Baugnies on 21 June 1891, the day after Fauré's return to Paris from Italy.

Cinq Mélodies "de Venise" had its premiere at the Société Nationale de Musique on 2 April 1892, sung by Maurice Bagès.

== Sources ==
- Johnson, Graham (2009). Gabriel Fauré: The Songs and their Poets. London: Guildhall School of Music and Drama. ISBN 978-0-7546-5960-0.
- Nectoux, Jean-Michel (2004). Gabriel Fauré: A Musical Life. Cambridge: Cambridge University Press. ISBN 0-521-61695-6.
- Orledge, Robert (1979). Gabriel Fauré. London: Eulenburg Books. ISBN 0-903873-40-0.
