= Universal Postal Monument =

- Weltpostdenkmal
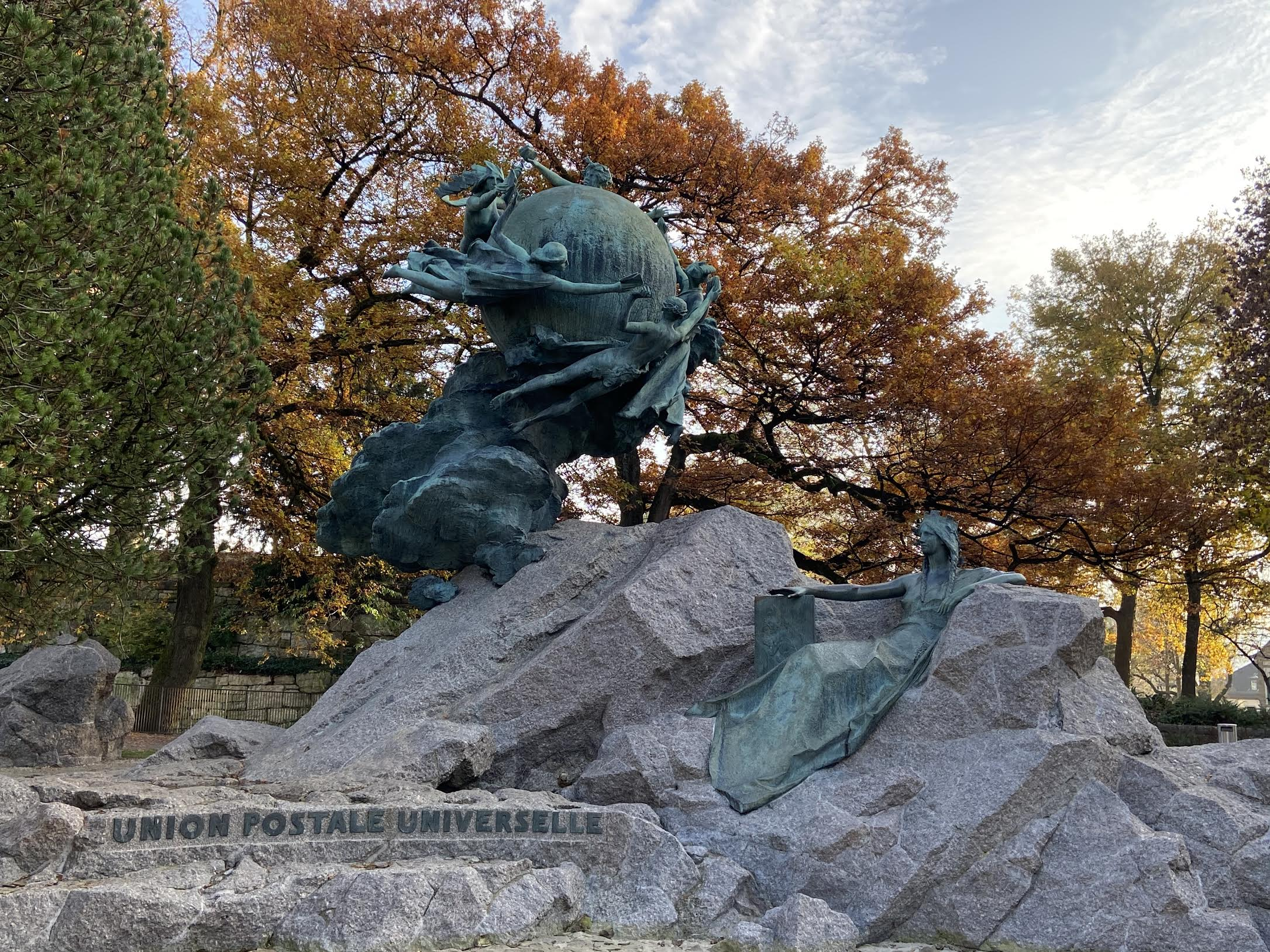
- Interactive map of Universal Postal Monument
- Location: Bern, Switzerland
- Coordinates: 46°56′45″N 7°26′25″E
- Designer: René de Saint-Marceaux
- Height: 33 feet (10 m)
- Opening date: 1909

The Universal Postal Monument (in German: Weltpostdenkmal), is a monument located in the Kleine Schanze park in the Swiss city of Bern. It commemorates the fact that Bern is the founding city and headquarters of the Universal Postal Union, which was founded in 1874.

The bronze sculpture entitled Autour du monde ("Around the World") was done by the French sculptor René de Saint-Marceaux, who won an international competition in 1903. The inauguration of the monument took place on October 4, 1909.

The sculpture stands behind a wide fountain basin on an artificial rock formation, at the base of which a spring emerges. Atop the rock's highest point is a column of clouds, meant to symbolize the majestic grandeur of the Bernese Alps, seemingly about to escape into space. This column of clouds supports a globe around which 5 female figures, representing the inhabited continents, hover and exchange letters. On a granite base sits Berna, a personification of the city of Bern in female form, who rests her outstretched right hand on the coat of arms of the city of Bern.

The motif of the globe with the 5 messengers passing letters to one another was incorporated into the flag of the Universal Postal Union in 1967 and thus became its emblem. Furthermore, the motif appears on hundreds of postage stamps worldwide.
