= François Pompon =

French sculptor

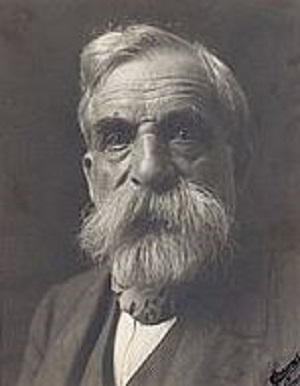
- Pompon, c. 1918
- Born: 9 May 1855; Saulieu, Burgundy, France
- Died: 6 May 1933 (aged 77); Paris, France
- Education: École nationale supérieure des arts décoratifs
- Known for: Sculpture
- Notable work: Ours blanc (White Bear)
- Movement: Animalier

François Pompon (French pronunciation: [fʁɑ̃swa pɔ̃pɔ̃]; 9 May 1855 – 6 May 1933) was a French sculptor and animalier. Pompon made his Salon debut in 1879, exhibiting a statue of Victor Hugo's Cosette (from Les Misérables). He was a pioneer of modern stylized animalier sculpture. He was not fully recognized for his artistic accomplishments until the age of 67 at the Salon d'Automne of 1922 with the work Ours blanc (White Bear). Pompon died in Paris, France, on 6 May 1933.

== Early life ==
Pompon, the son of a cabinet maker, was born on 9 May 1855 in Saulieu, Burgundy, France. At age 15 he was working as an apprentice marble carver in a Dijon funerary monument company, but soon thereafter took up studies at the school of fine arts in Dijon. By 1873 his family had moved to Paris where the Franco-Prussian War had caused significant damage to the French capital just a few years prior to his arrival. Pompon found work on rebuilding projects, beginning with his work to produce architectural ornamentation for the new Hotel de Ville de Paris.

== Career ==
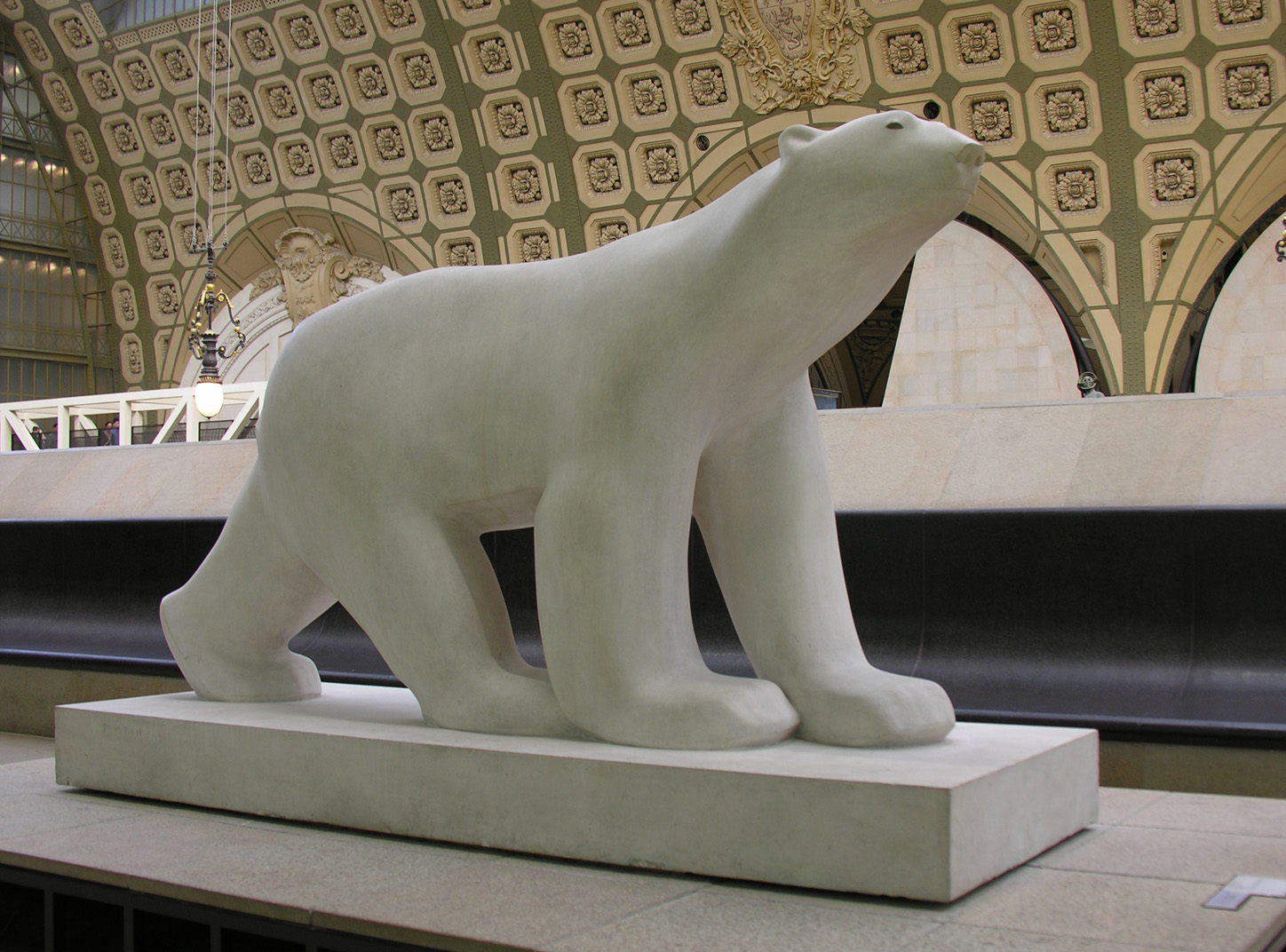
Ours blanc (White Bear) — sculpture by François Pompon, pierre de Lens, 1927

Beginning in 1876 he studied under the noted animalier sculptor Pierre Louis Rouillard at the École nationale supérieure des arts décoratifs. In order to support himself, he took jobs as a craftsman working for Antonin Mercié, Alexandre Falguière, and Renae de Saint-Marceaux. Later he worked as Auguste Rodin's assistant. Rodin once told him, "you will be a great artist" after viewing one of his sculptures. Pompon made his Salon debut in 1879, exhibiting a statue of Victor Hugo's Cosette (from Les Misérables). In subsequent Salons he presented some works in the form of a few bronzes and plasters. As it turned out Rodin was correct—he would become a great artist—but it would take nearly 50 more years for Pompon to be truly discovered and recognized for his innovative style. He had some mild success in 1919 when the Musée de Luxembourg purchased a turtle dove he had sculpted in stone. Following this, the Museum of Grenoble purchased three plaster works in 1921.

Widespread recognition and fame finally came at age 67 at the Salon d'Automne of 1922 with the work Ours blanc, also known as White Bear or Polar Bear in Stride, of which the final exemplar in white stone is located at the Musée d'Orsay in Paris. The acclaim he received in 1922 finally allowed him to work for himself and with this new-found independence he was able to produce some of his most important works. He created Grand Cerf (Large Deer), a monumental bronze that was erected on the plaza of Arnhem in the Netherlands. Next came Taureau (Bull, 1933) that was erected in his hometown of Saulieu. As founders for his bronzes he employed, primarily, Valsuani and Hébrard. A number of other foundries began to seize upon his notoriety and cast fakes of his work, many of extremely poor quality.

Near the end of his life, Pompon donated to the Dijon Museum nearly 300 of his works in plaster, terracotta and bronze.

== Death and legacy ==
Pompon died in Paris, France, on 6 May 1933. He is best remembered as a forerunner of modern sculpture, and influenced Constantin Brâncuși among others.

== Gallery ==
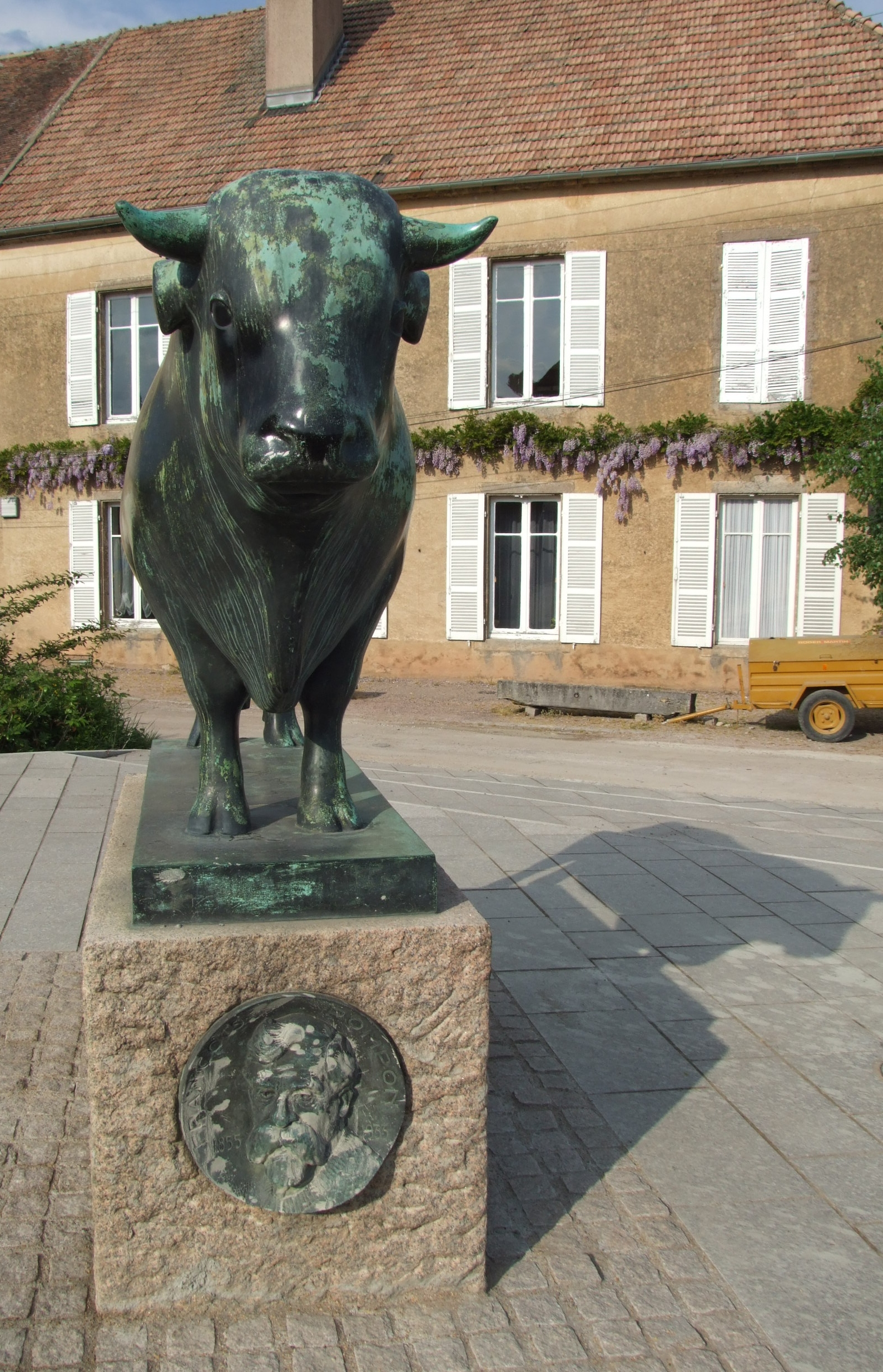
Taureau, Saulieu, Bourgogne

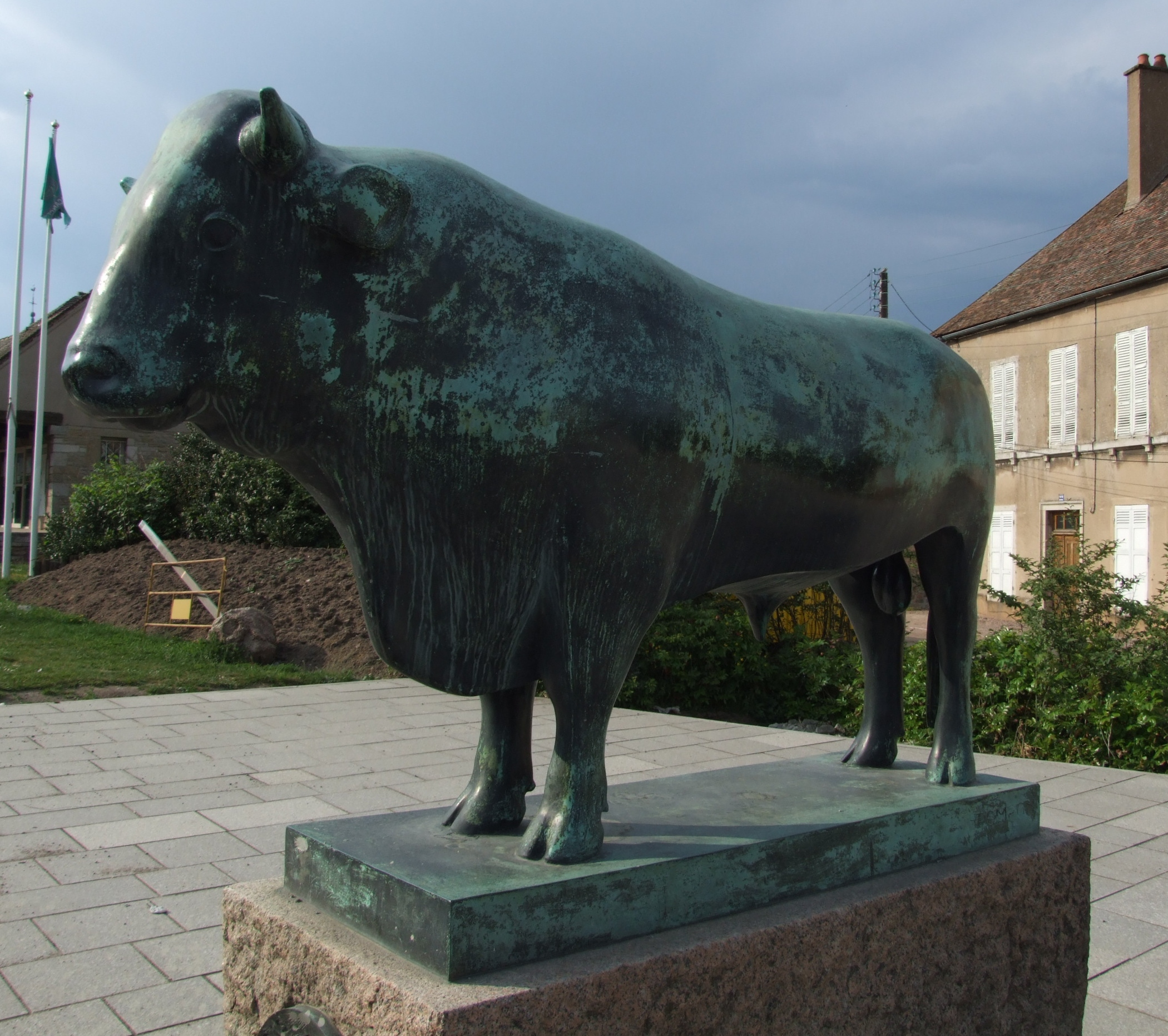
Idem

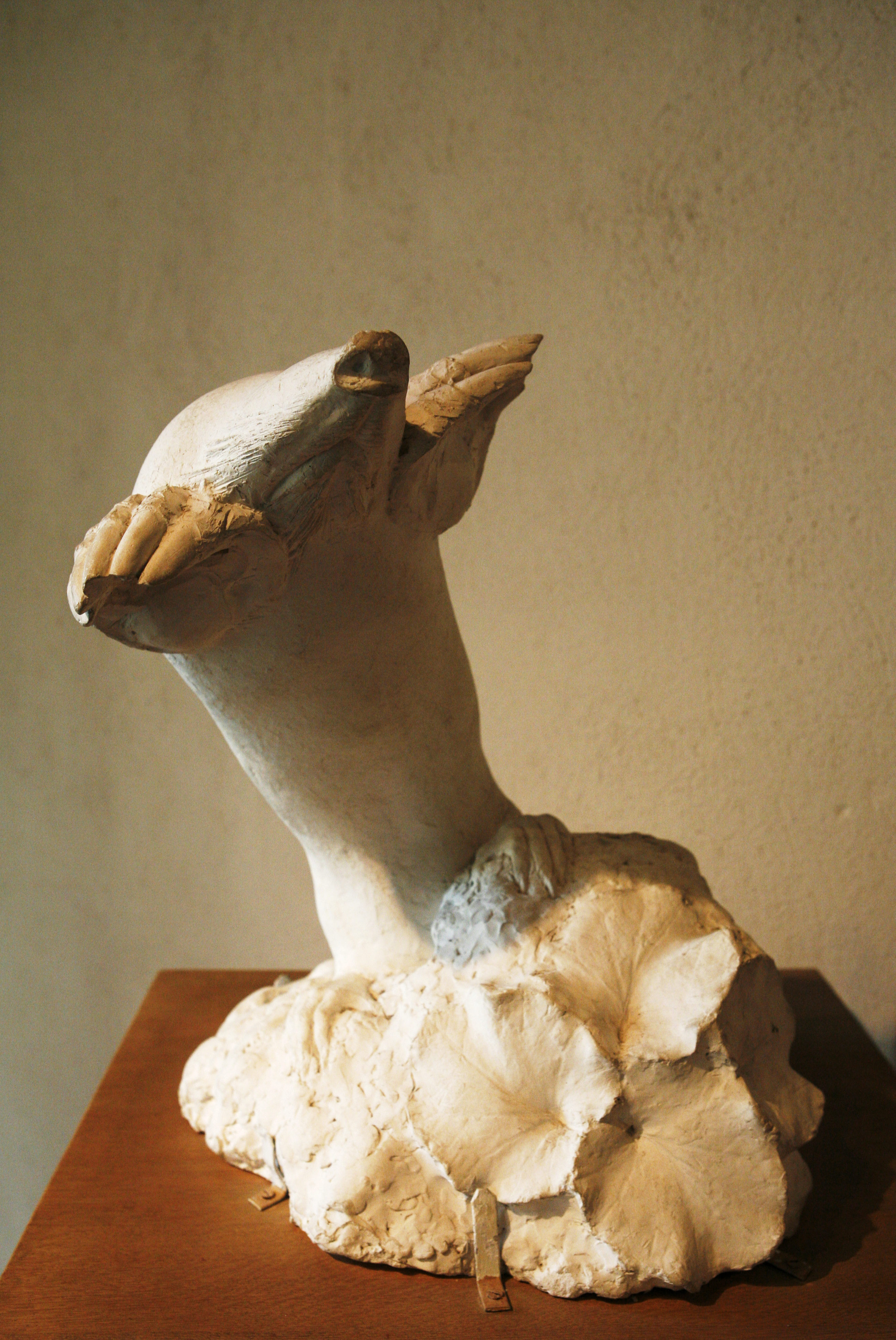
Taupe

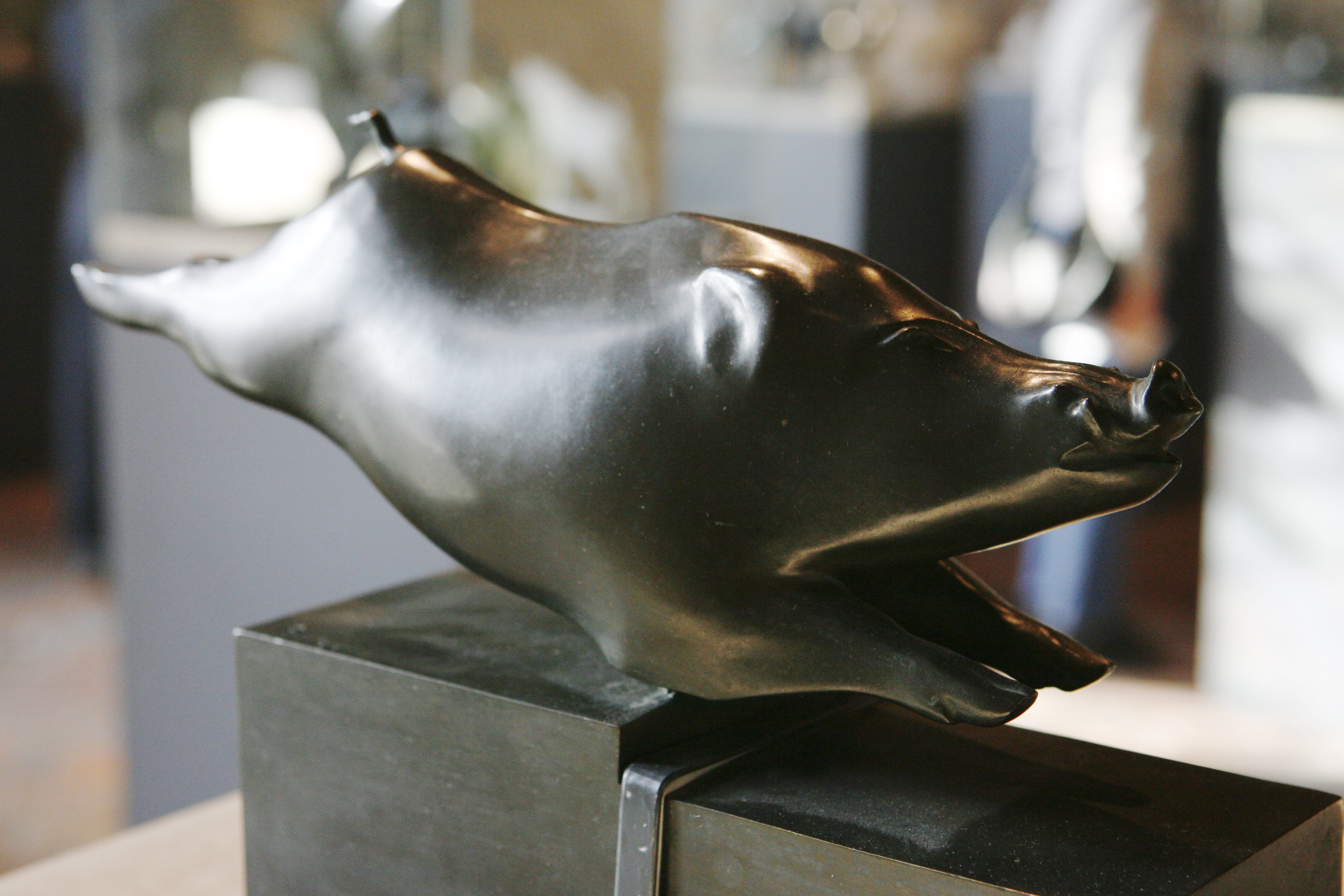
Sanglier

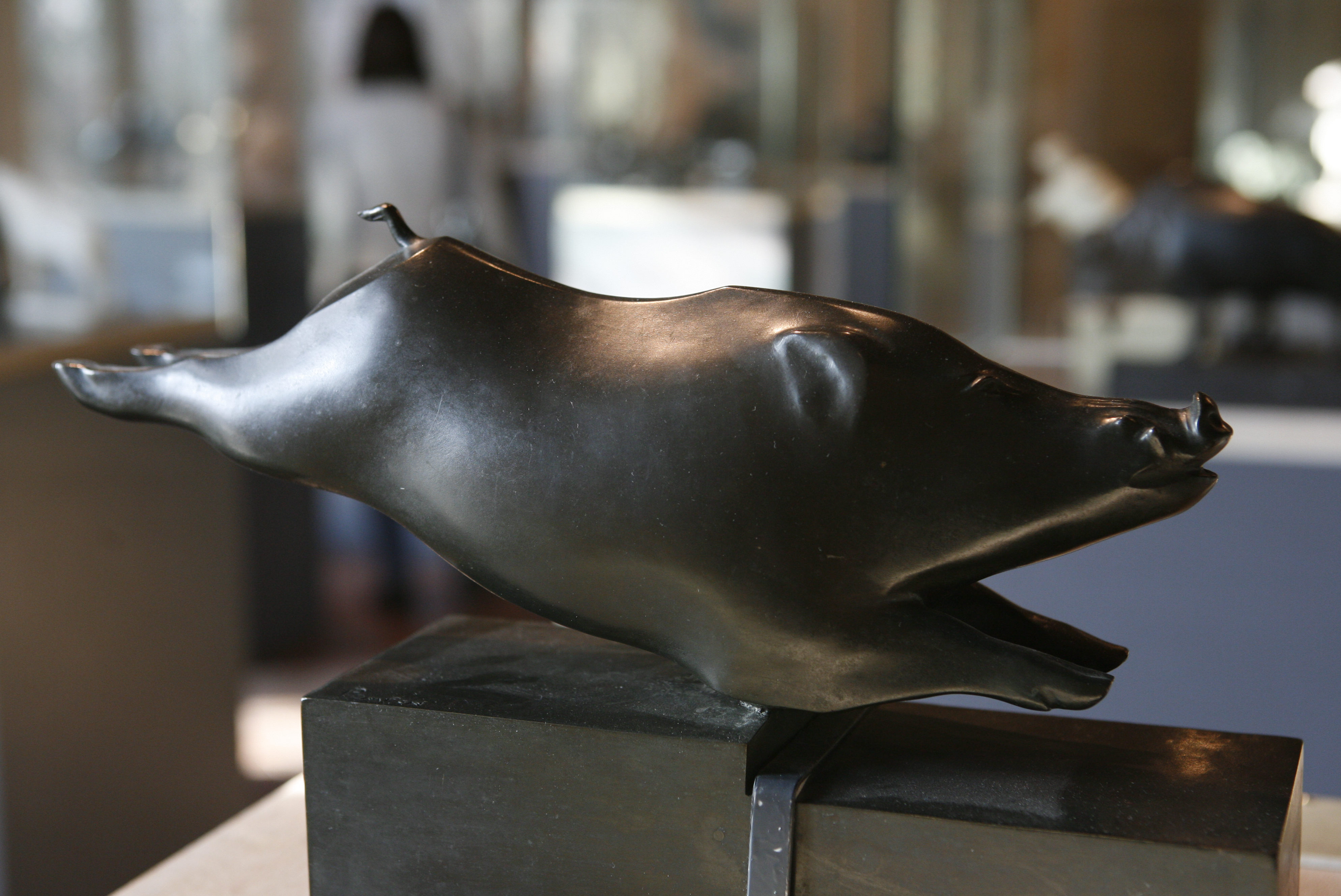
Sanglier

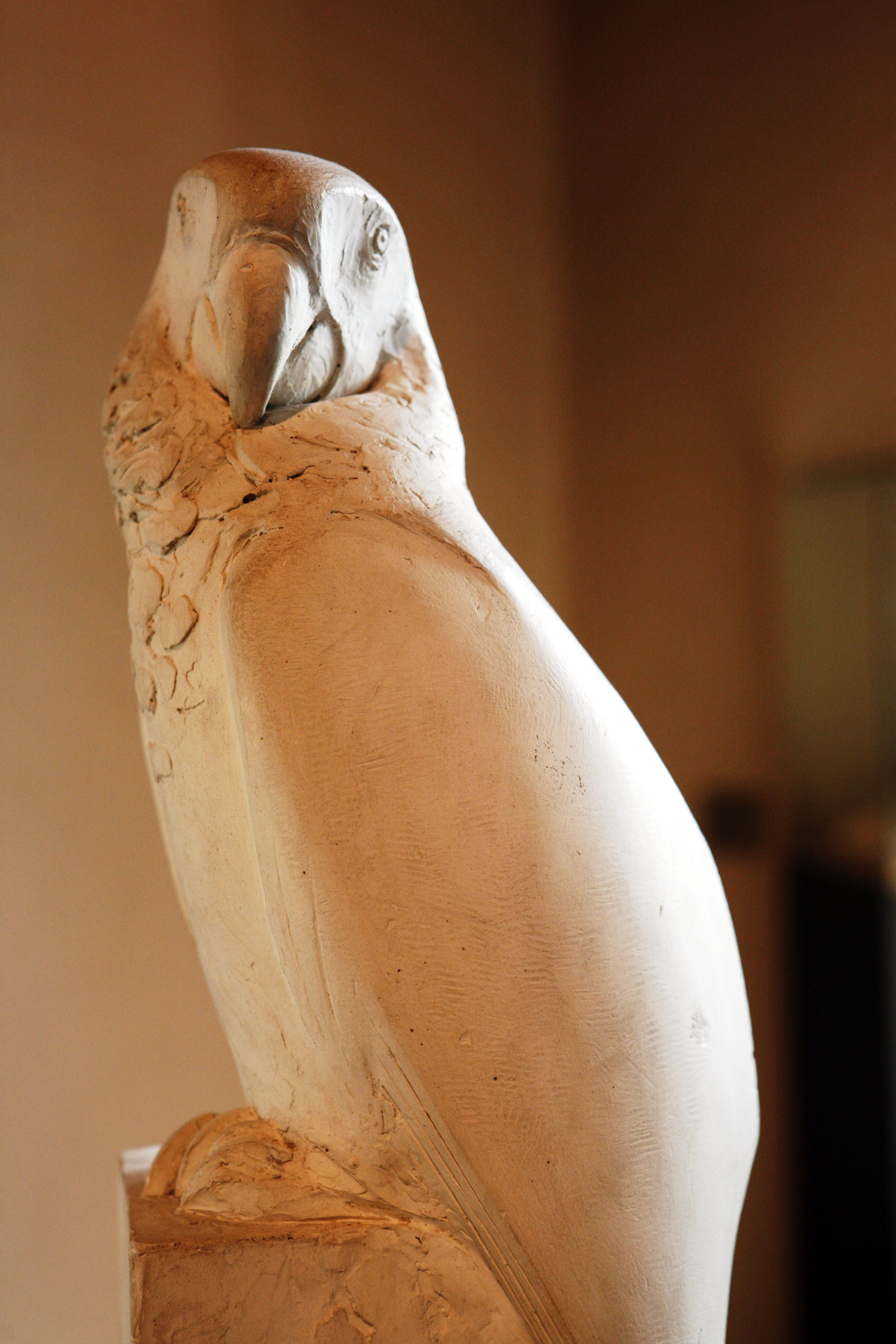
Perroquet

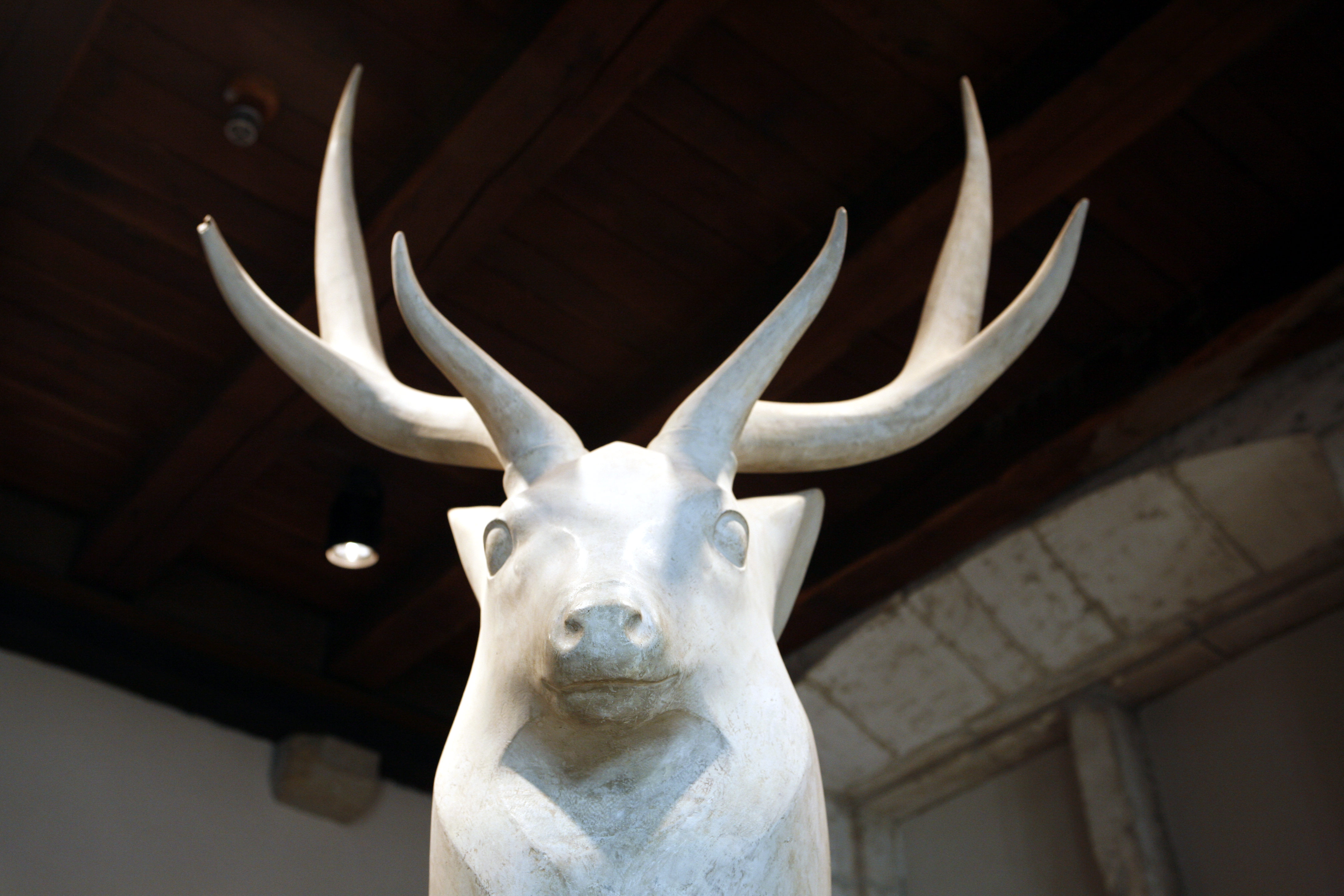
Cerf

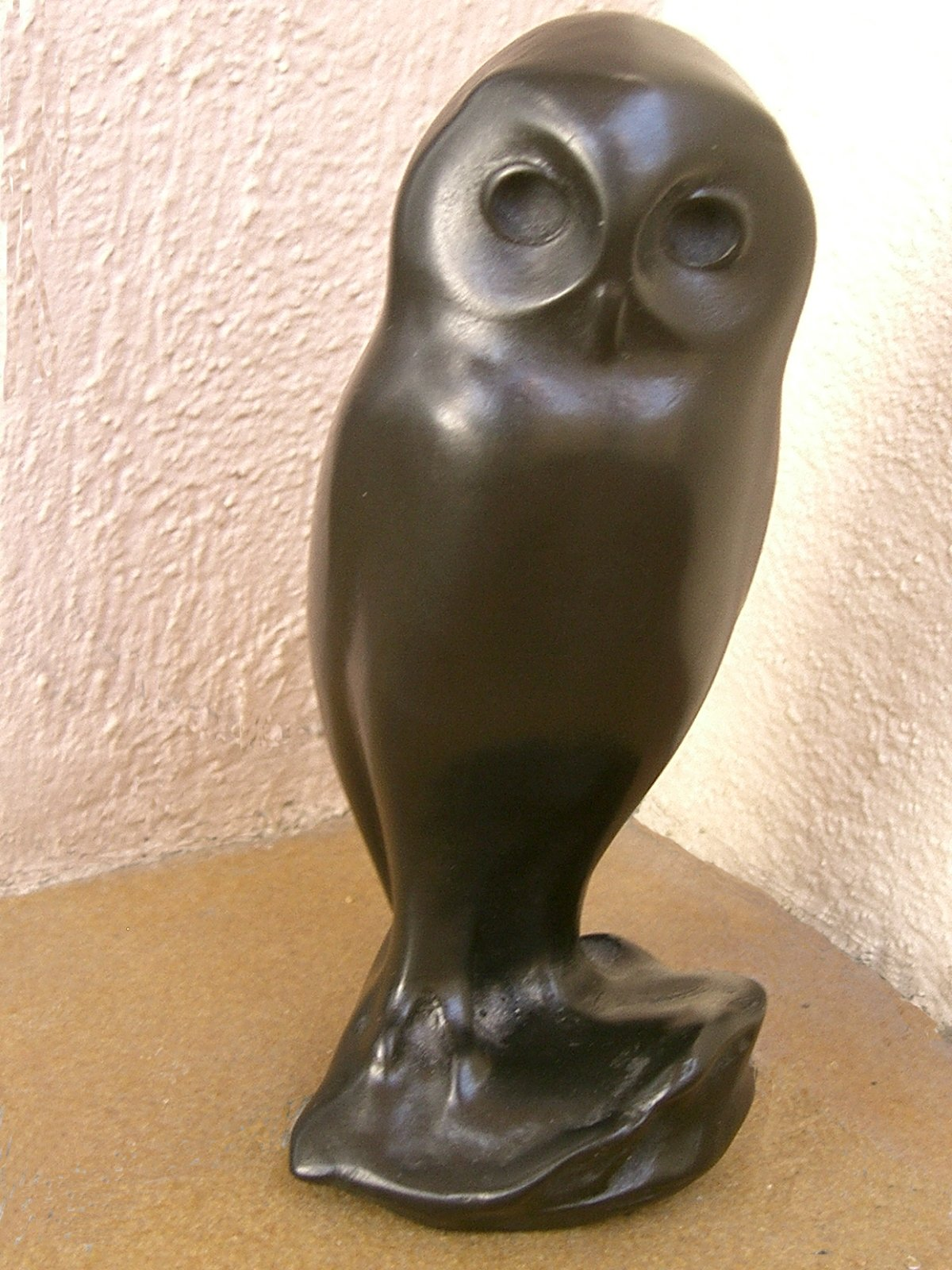
Petite chouette (1918)

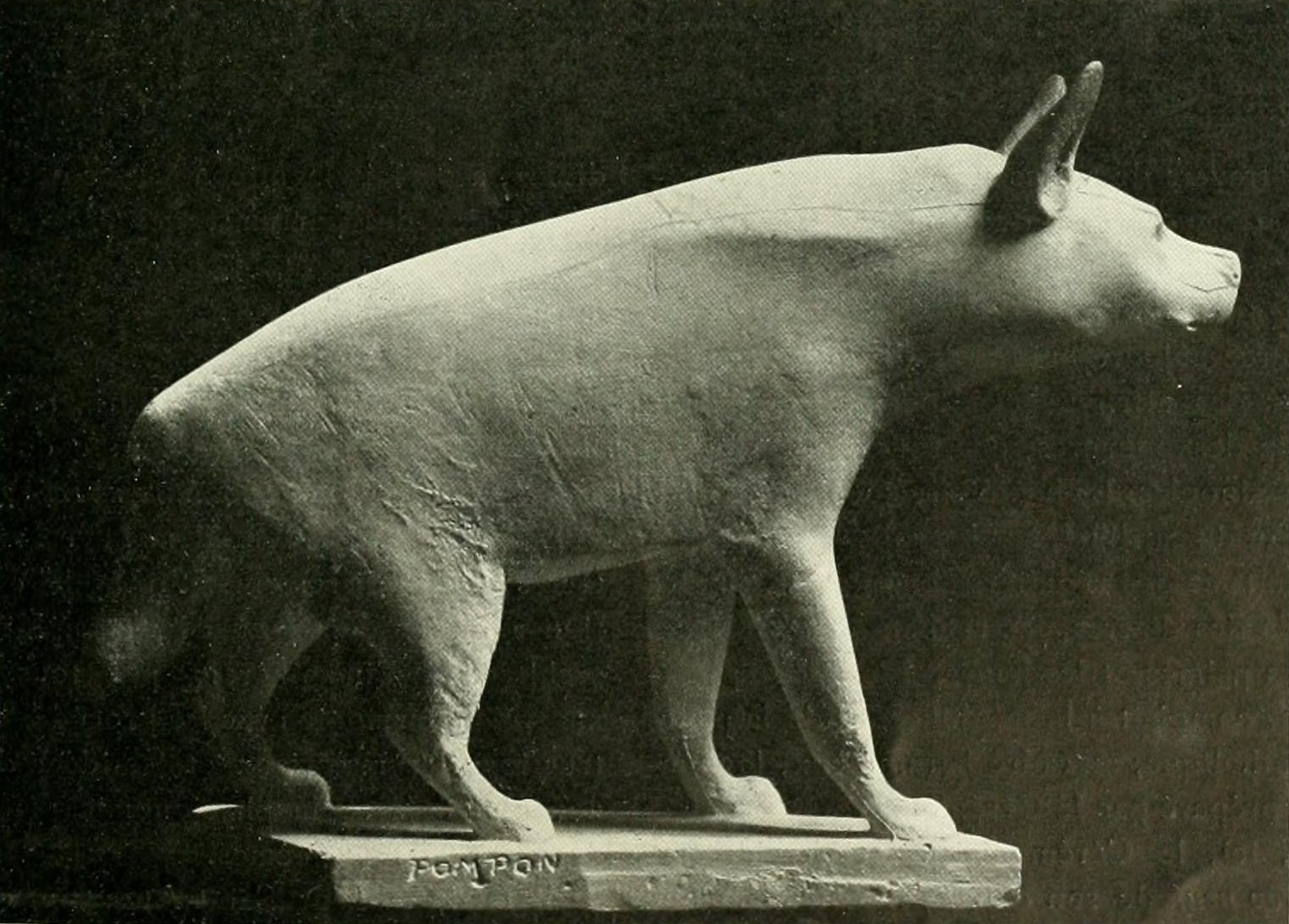
Hyène

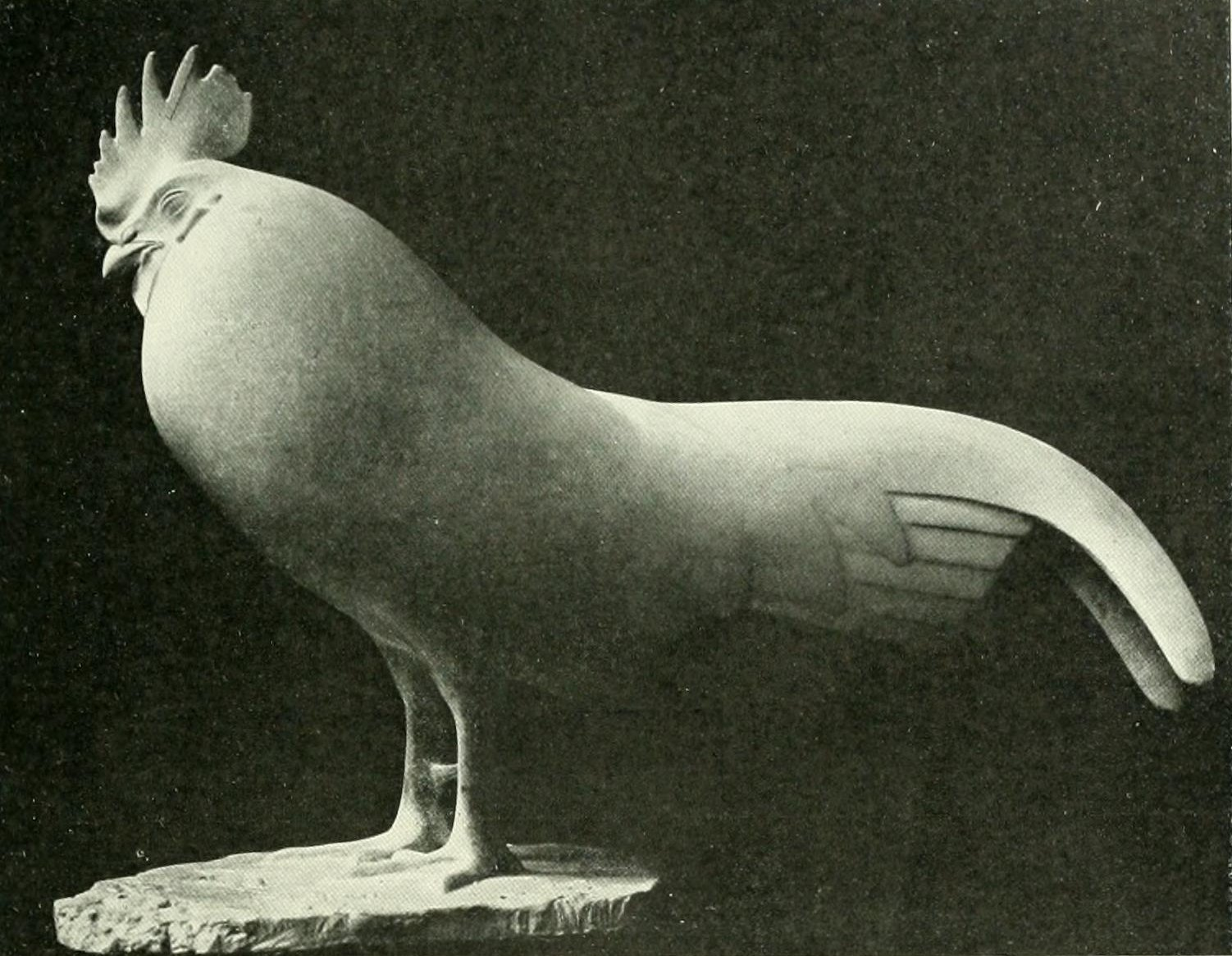
Coq

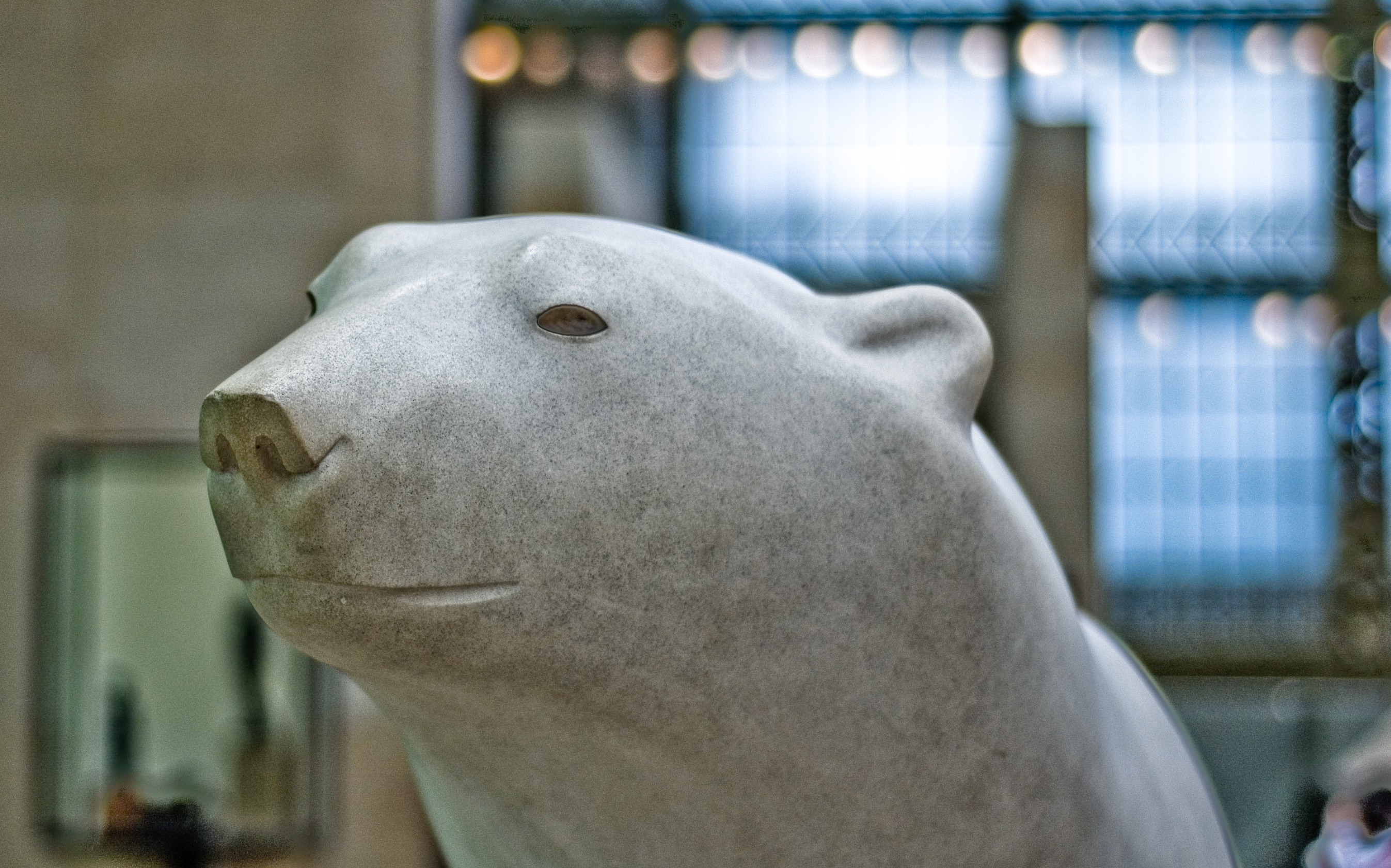
Ours blanc, detail (Musée d'Orsay)

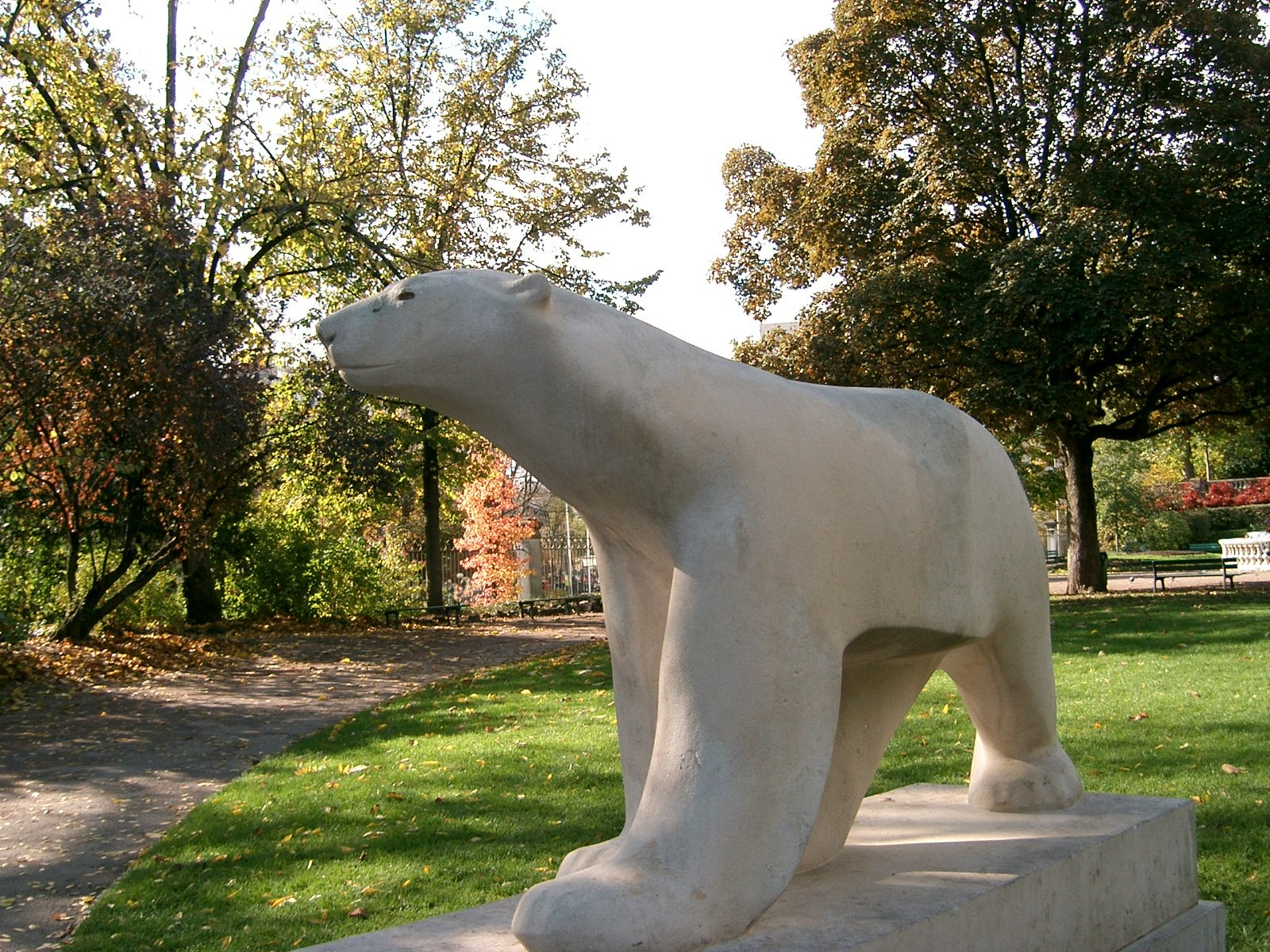
Ours blanc (Jardin Darcy, Dijon)

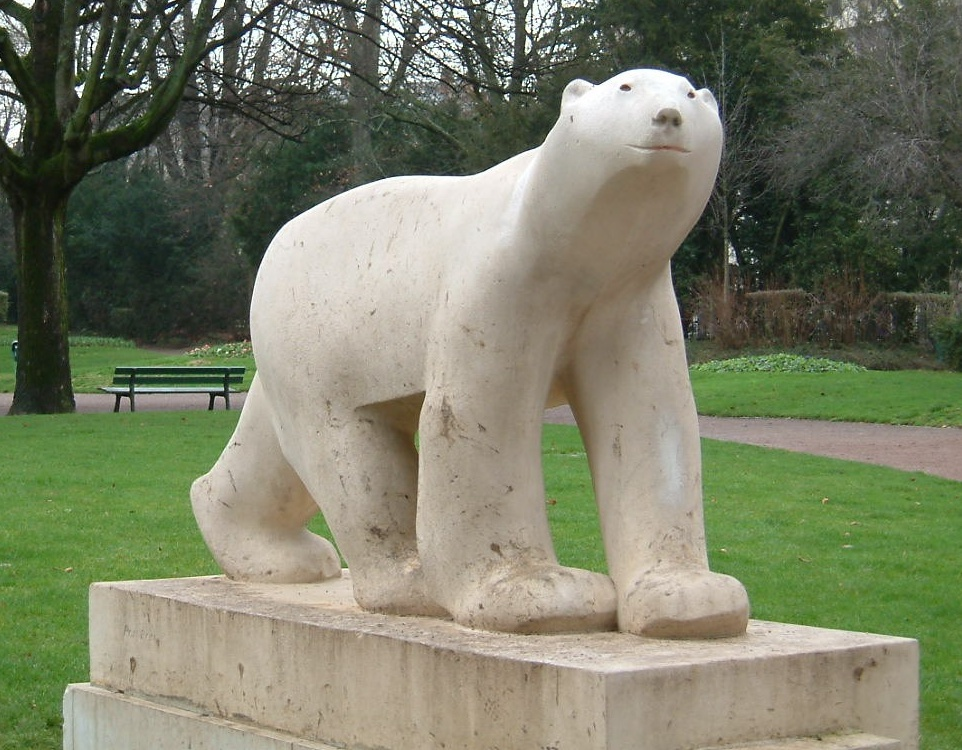
Ours blanc (Jardin Darcy, Dijon)

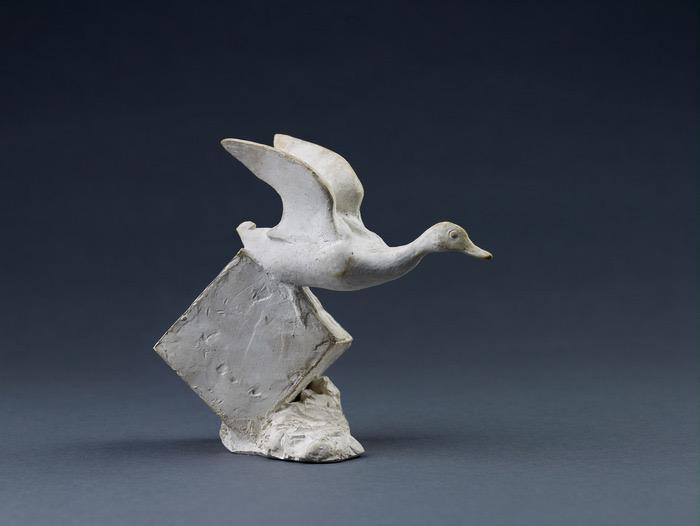
Wild Duck Taking Flight, 1932

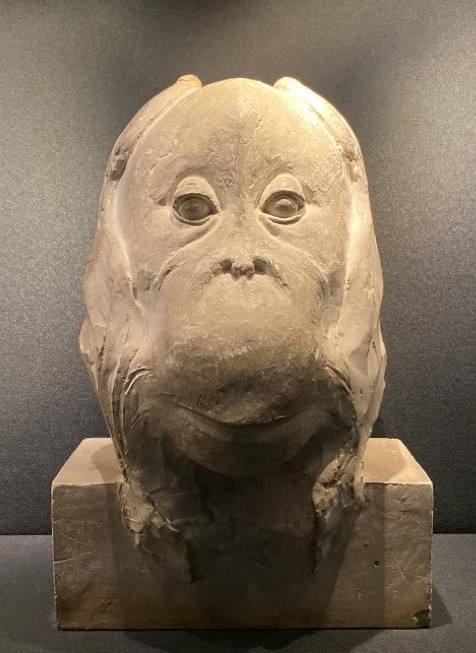
Orangutan bust

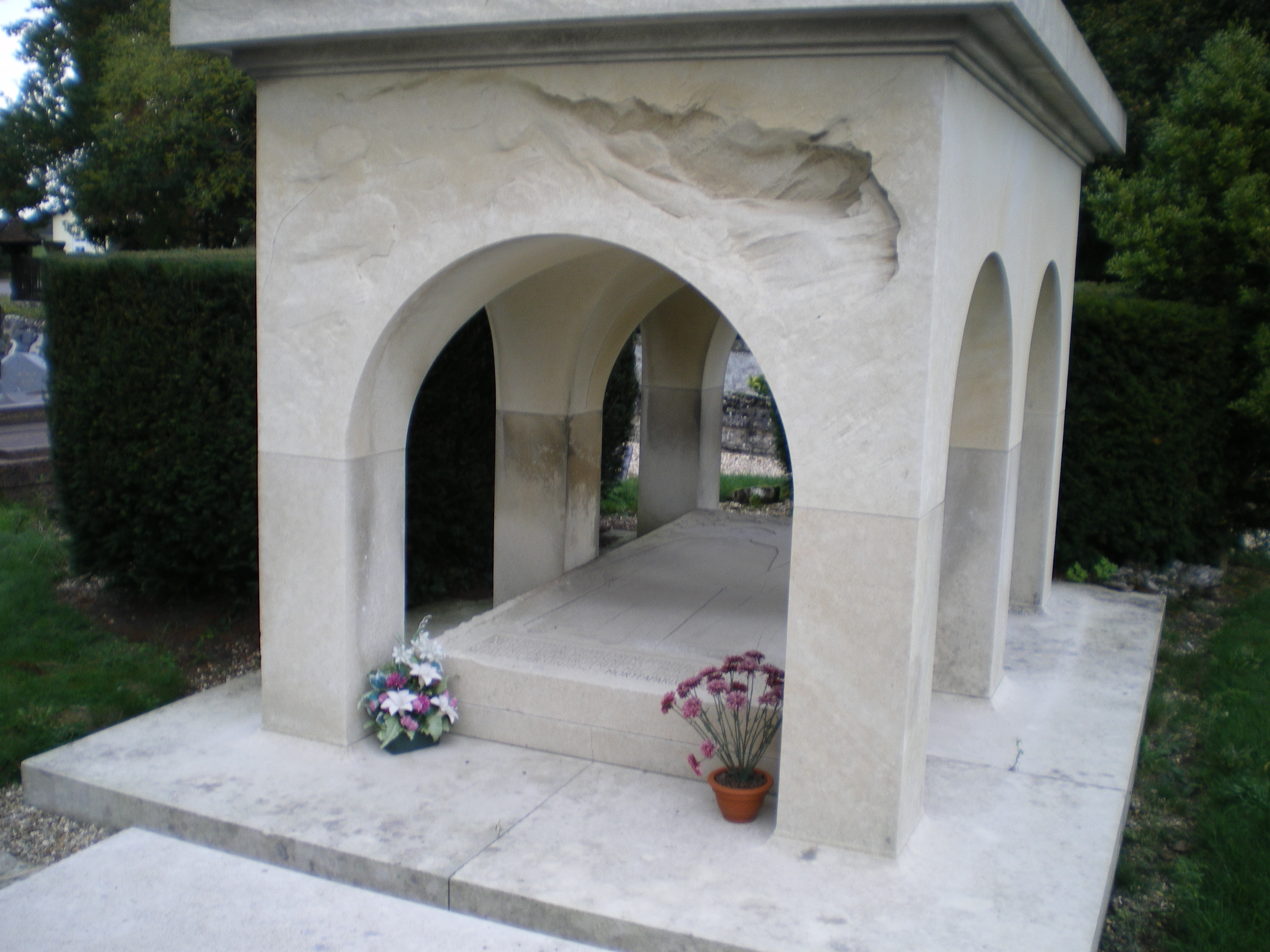
Tomb of René and Marguerite de Saint-Marceaux

== Location of sculptures ==
- Musée des Beaux-arts, Dijon, France
- Musée François Pompon, Saulieu, Burgundy, France
- Musée d'Orsay, Paris
- Metropolitan Museum of Art, New York
- Middelheim Open Air Sculpture Museum, Antwerp, Belgium
