= Polar Bear (furniture) =

Piece of furniture

The Polar Bear (in the original French Ours Polaire) is a sofa and armchair set designed by the French designer Jean Royère in the late 1940s. The design was made between 1947 and 1967.

The name given to the piece is due to the comparison with a polar bear's fur due to its white fuzzy velvet upholstering.

== Design ==
A 2019 article in Town and Country magazine described the design of the sofa as "Elegantly rounded and incomparably cushy" and made from a "soft woolen velvet reminiscent of plush toy fabric". The magazine attributed the piece's success to Royère's ability to make "the minimalist pieces look almost structure-less, entirely covering the skeletons—created using traditional wood-bending techniques—in layers of synthetic foam". The Parisian dealer Patrick Seguin described the pieces as "emblematic of Royère's spirit of absolutely free creativity and reflect a true elegance without any kind of ostentation".

== History ==
The sofa arose out of biomorphic designs that Royère created for furniture for his mother's apartment on the Rue du Faubourg Saint-Honoré in Paris. The Polar Bear sofa was initially met with limited success but became increasingly popular in the 1950s. It was first shown in public at the Art et Industrie exhibition "La Résidence Française".

The pieces have risen in popularity in recent years, with individual sofas selling for more than $500,000. In 2016, the auction record for a Polar Bear sofa was established at $754,000 at Phillips in New York. The Parisian dealer Patrick Seguin sold a set of the Polar Bear sofa and two chairs for $1 million in the 2010s. An authorized re-edition of the Polar Bear sofa has never been permitted. Original customers could commission the manufacture of an individual Polar Bear sofa or a pair of armchairs, with the three pieces also available as a set. Only 150 sets were manufactured between 1947 and 1967, with a further 150 sofas and 150 pairs of chairs.

After the pieces' unveiling, the Shah of Iran Mohammad Reza Pahlavi bought several chairs for his daughter Princess Shahnaz's Tehran home, France's Minister of Foreign Affairs commissioned two chairs for his office in Helsinki.

Prominent owners include the actress Jennifer Aniston, the comedian Ellen DeGeneres, and the art dealer Larry Gagosian. The musician Kanye West described his Polar Bear sofa as "my favorite piece of furniture we own". West sold his Maybach car to purchase the sofa.
