= Ernest Ange Duez =

French painter (1843–1896)

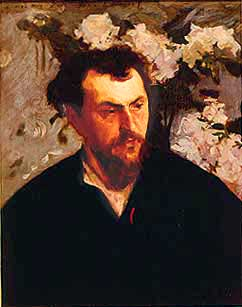
Portrait of Ernest-Ange Duez, John Singer Sargent, c. 1884

Ernest Ange Duez (also known as Ernest-Ange Duez and Ernest Duez, 7 March 1843 – 4 April 1896) was a French painter of genre scenes, portraits, landscapes and religious subjects.

Although he was an admirer of Édouard Manet and owned paintings by Manet, Claude Monet, Edgar Degas and Berthe Morisot, his palette was more subdued than that of most of the Impressionists, and his technique more controlled. His style, between that of the conservative Paris Salon and Impressionism, has been called juste milieu, and he has been compared to Alfred Stevens, Giuseppe De Nittis, and James Tissot.

== Biography ==
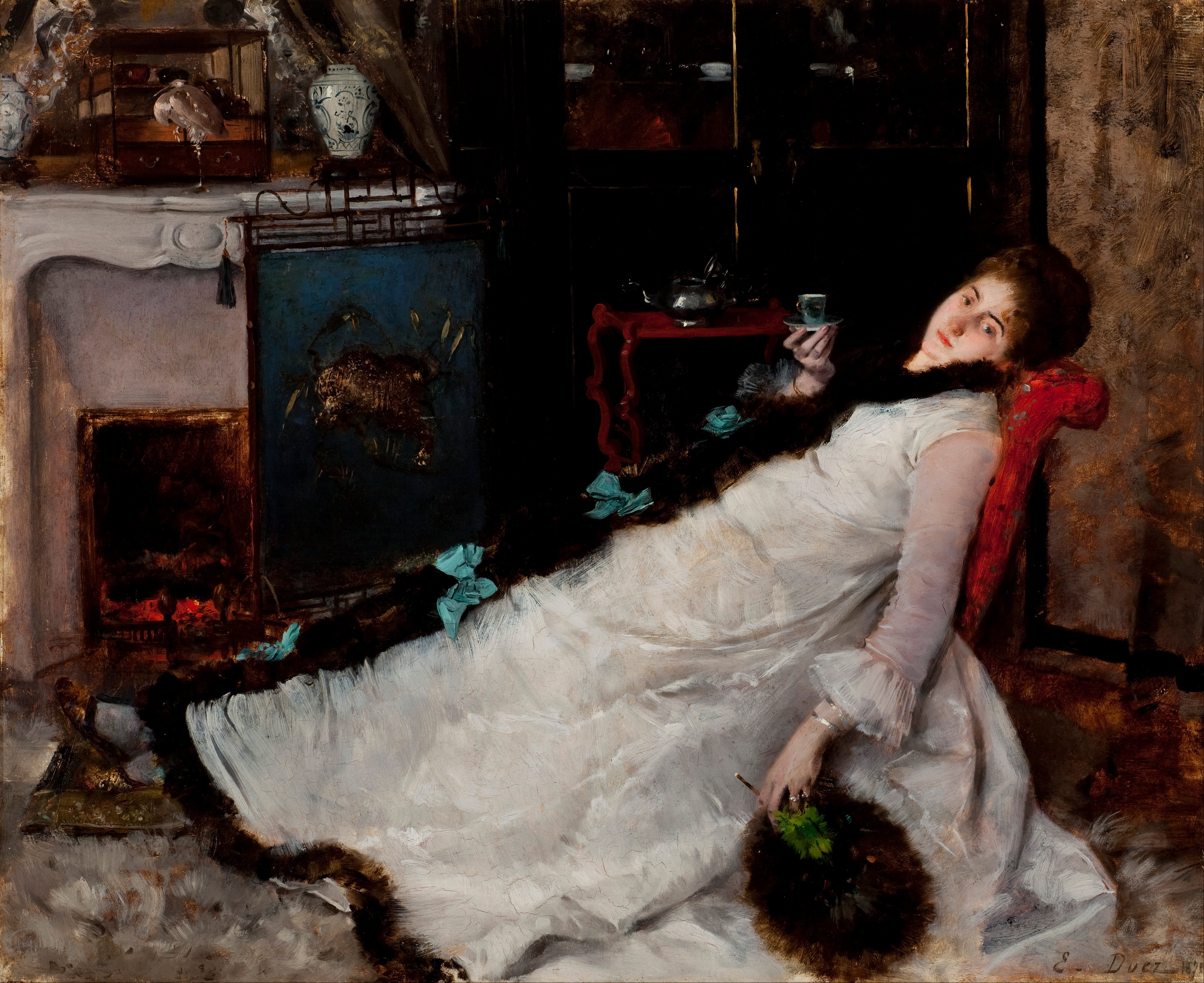
En repos (1891)

Duez was born on 7 March 1843 in Paris, and studied painting under Isidore Pils. He first exhibited at the Salon of 1868 with Mater Dolorosa, and achieved success there in 1874 with a third-class medal for his paintings Splendeur and Misère. He won other medals there subsequently.

Genre scenes depicting modern life included Au restaurant Le Doyen (1878) and Café sur la Terrasse (1890). Portraits included Mme Duez (1877) and Alphonse de Neuville (1880).

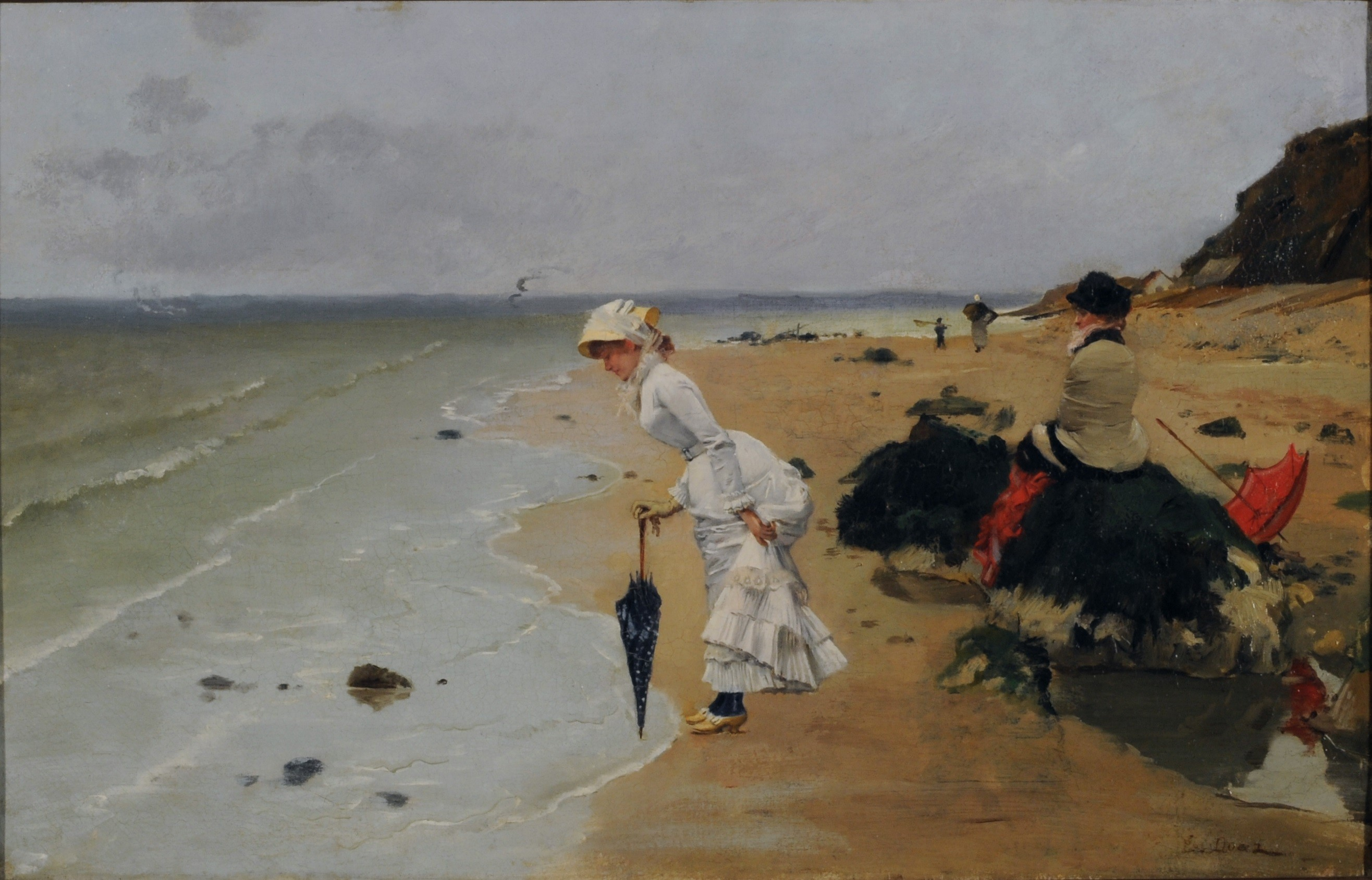
Sur la plage

Landscapes and seaside scenes were often inspired by the Normandy countryside around Villerville and Le Havre. In 1879 at the Salon he exhibited the large triptych Saint Cuthbert, depicting the stages of the life of Cuthbert set in landscapes based on the countryside around Villerville. Considered his greatest work, it is now in the Musée d'Orsay.

In 1883 Duez moved into a studio on boulevard Berthier, close to that of John Singer Sargent on the same street. Singer painted portraits of Duez and his wife in 1884–6. He married Amélie Lebatard (1854-1934) in December 1876, who was a well-known amateur singer, and was the first to perform Gabriel Fauré's newly composed songs "Mandoline" and "En sourdine" (the first two songs of Cinq mélodies "de Venise"), while Fauré and the couple were staying as guests of the Princesse de Polignac in Venice in 1891. Duez's circle also included the painters Paul-Albert Besnard, Jacques-Émile Blanche and Roger-Joseph Jourdain.

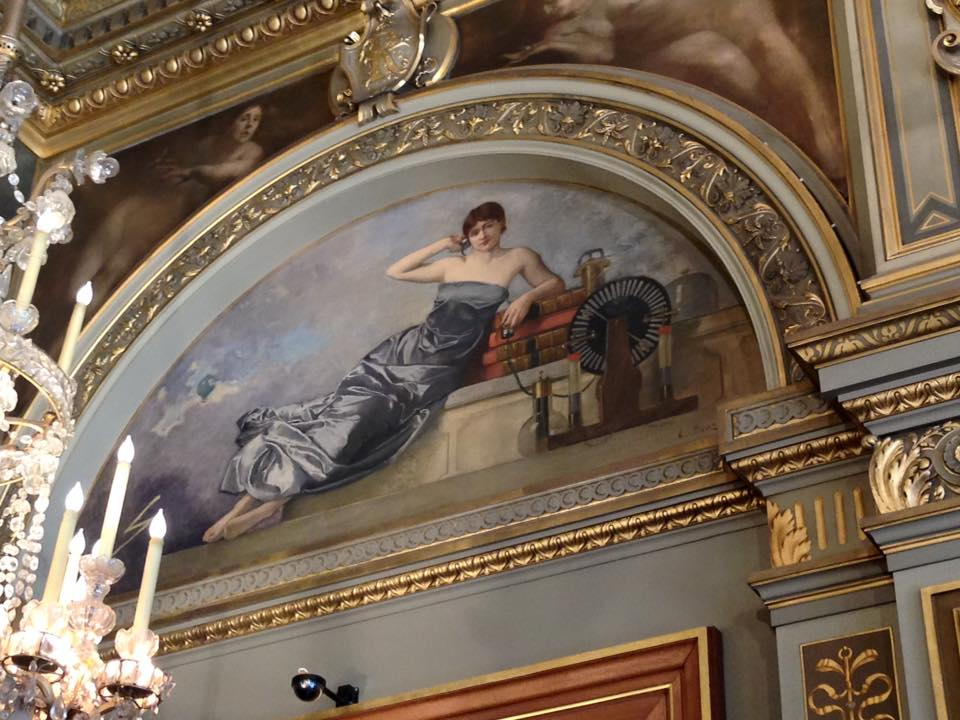
La Physique, 1892

Duez carried out a number of commissions for the adornment of public buildings in Paris. These included Novembre and Décembre in the Palais Garnier's Galerie du glacier, Virgile s’inspirant dans les bois (1888) for the Sorbonne, La Botanique and La Physique (1892) for the Hôtel de Ville's Salon des Sciences, and L’heure de la tétée à la maternité (1895) for the Assistance publique - Hôpitaux de Paris.

Duez died on 4 April 1896 from a cerebral haemorrhage while cycling in the Forest of Saint-Germain-en-Laye. He was buried in the Parisian Montmartre Cemetery (division 23).

The contents of his studio were auctioned on June 11-12 of this year at the Galerie Georges Petit in Paris.

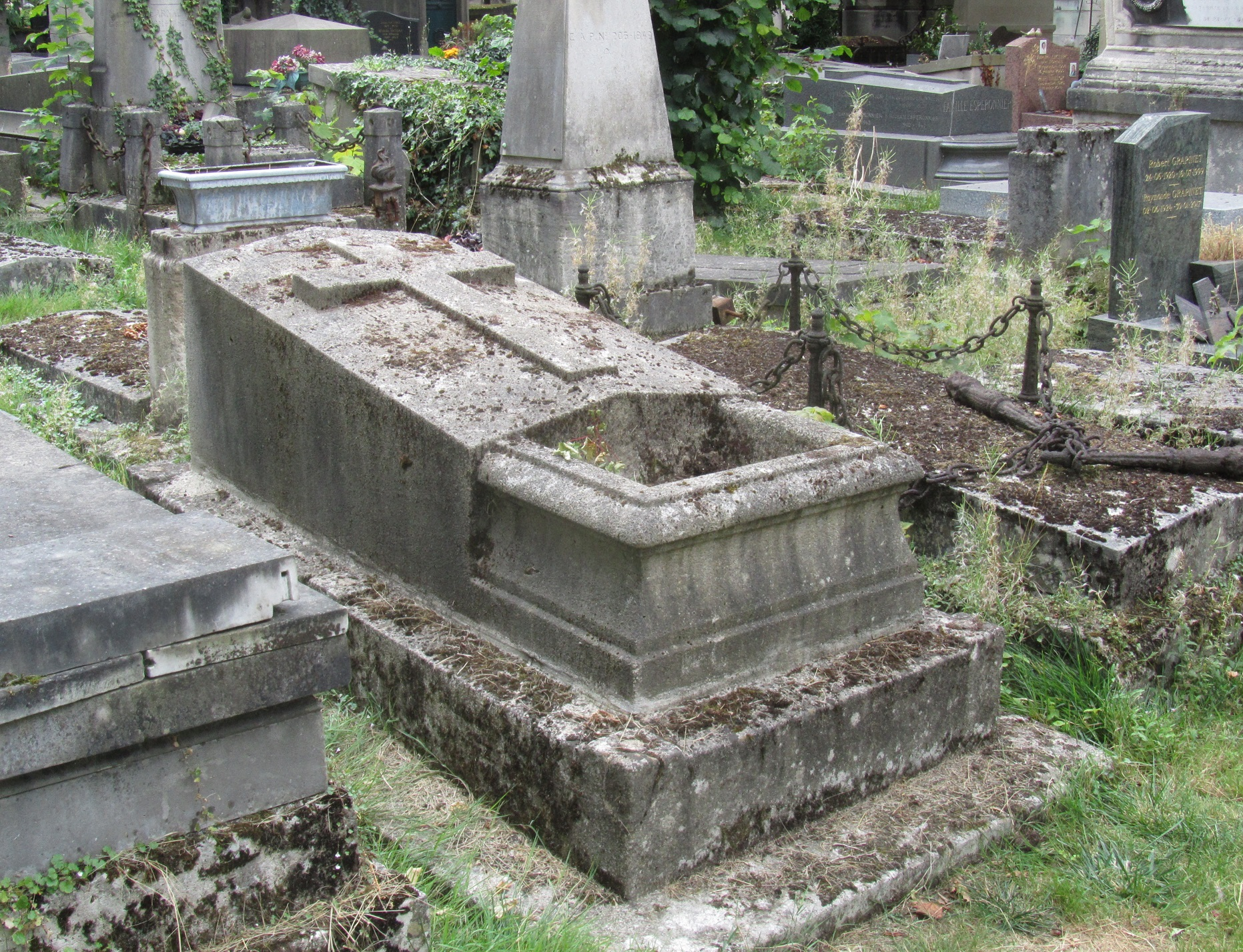
Grave of the Duez family
