= Polar Bear (schooner) =

The Polar Bear was an 81-ton schooner purchased by Vilhjalmur Stefansson for the Canadian Arctic Expedition, 1913–1916. Built in 1911 by E.W. Heath Company of Seattle, the Polar Bear sailed two trading voyages to Siberia before being converted to a whaling vessel in 1913. In that year and in 1914, the Polar Bear hunted whales in the Arctic Ocean. In 1915, Stefansson chartered the Polar Bear as a support vessel, but as costs mounted, he purchased the ship outright. The Polar Bear served as a supply outpost for several years. In spring 1918, the ship ran aground on Barter Island and was heavily damaged.

The ship was repaired and refloated, then sold in 1919 for $5,000. After its sale, the Polar Bear returned to Siberian trading voyages, eventually entering the service of the Soviet Union. That nation renamed the ship Polyarnaya Zvezda (Pole Star) and operated it between 1925 and 1928 in Arctic coastal voyages. The ship's ultimate fate is uncertain, but it was reported to be unseaworthy in 1929.
