= René de Saint-Marceaux =

French sculptor

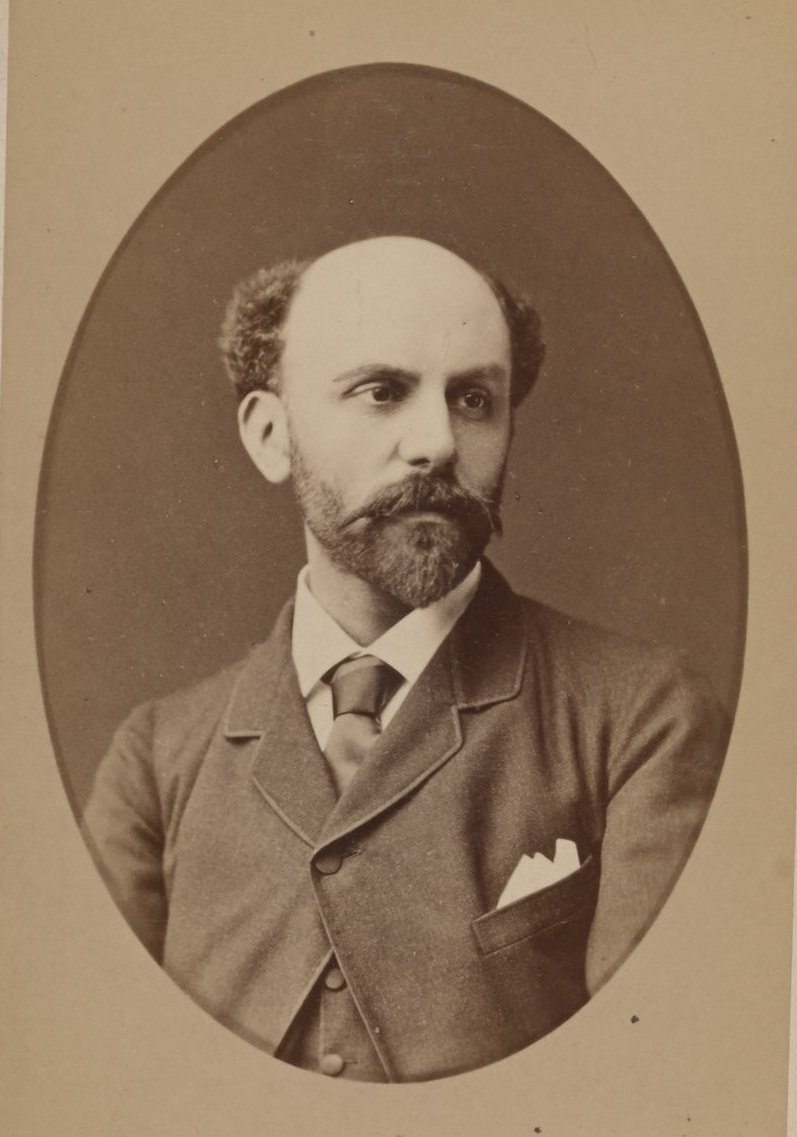
René de Saint-Marceaux; Photograph by Pierre Petit

Charles René de Paul de Saint-Marceaux (23 September 1845 – 23 April 1915) was a French sculptor.

== Biography ==
He was born in Reims on 23 September 1845 to Alexandre Jean de Paul de Saint-Marceaux, a member of a noble family, and Emélie Isabelle Moriset. His grandfather, Augustin de Saint-Marceaux, served as mayor of Reims. At age eighteen went to Paris to study at the École des Beaux-Arts. A student of François Jouffroy, he became primarily a sculptor of portrait busts and animals. He exhibited at the Paris salon from 1868, when, passing up the competition for the Prix de Rome, he decided to spend time in Florence instead. He passed a second sojourn in Italy in 1873–74. On his return, his marble Génie gardant le secret de la tombe ("Spirit Guarding the Secret of the Tomb"), conserved in the Musée d'Orsay, Paris, shows the marked influence of Michelangelo.

Among his works were several statues created for Baron Rothschild for his Château de Ferrières and the tomb at Montmartre Cemetery in Paris for Alexandre Dumas, fils.

In 1891 René de Saint-Marceaux joined the newly formed Société des artistes français.

In 1892, he married Marguerite Jourdain Baugnies and adopted her three children from her prior marriage.

Saint-Marceaux was also a medallist, and a collector of Ancient Greek coins. In 1907 he was commissioned to execute the plaquette for the Société française des Amis de la Médaille.

His bronze and granite monument for the headquarters of the Universal Postal Union in Bern, Switzerland, erected in 1909, represents the five continents as floating figures joined in transmitting messages around the globe. A postage stamp honoring the sculptor and the monument was issued jointly by Switzerland and France in 2009.

René de Saint-Marceaux died in Paris in 1915.

== Gallery ==
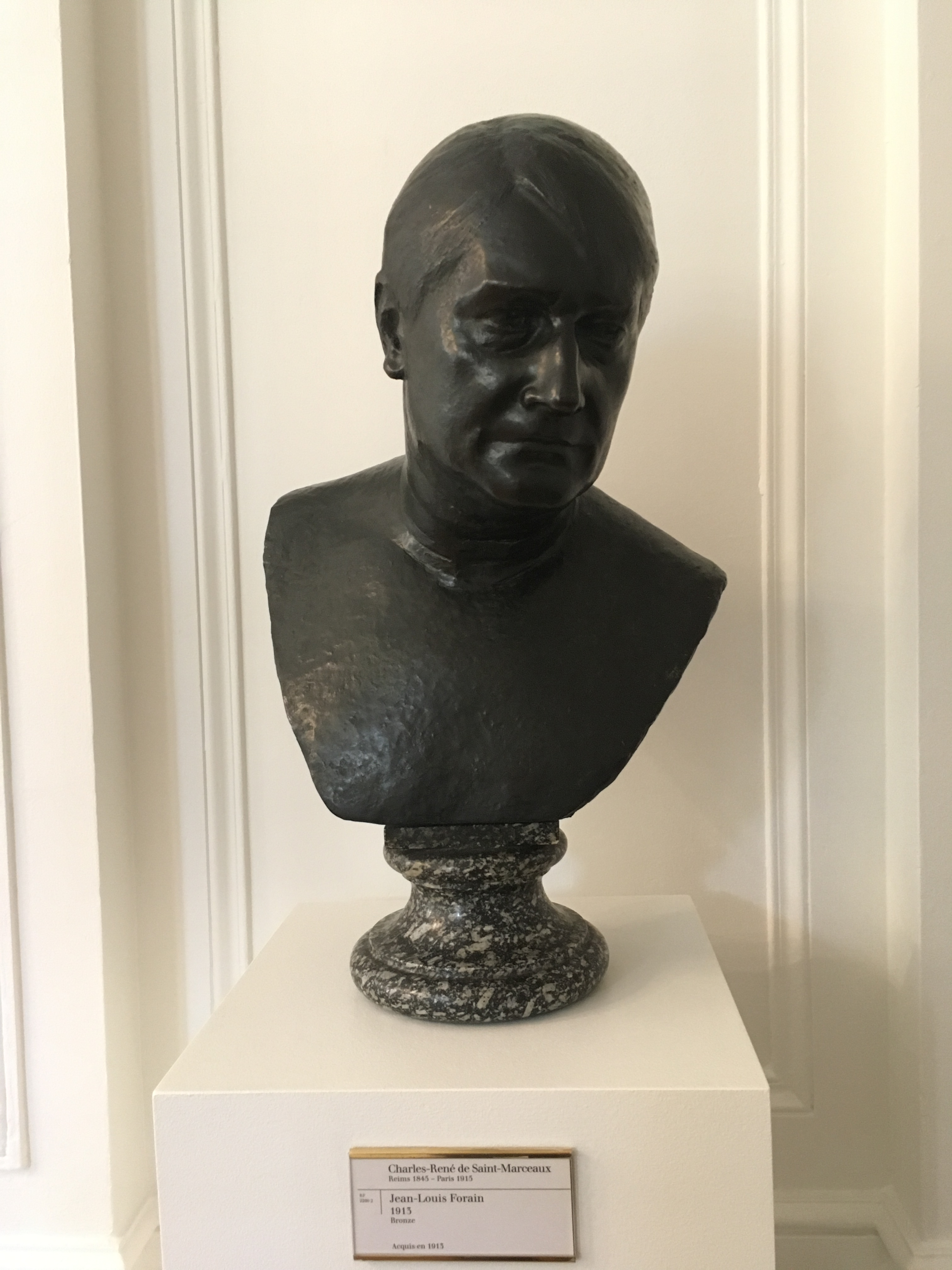
Bust of Jean-Louis Forain, 1913, Musée d'Orsay, Paris

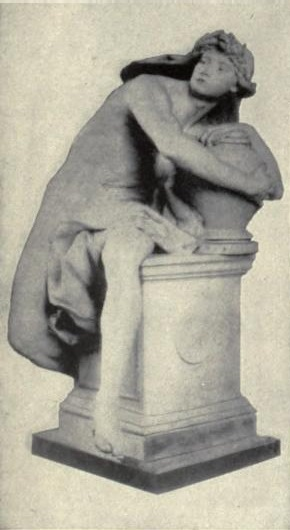
Spirit Guarding the Secret of the Tomb, Musée d'Orsay, Paris

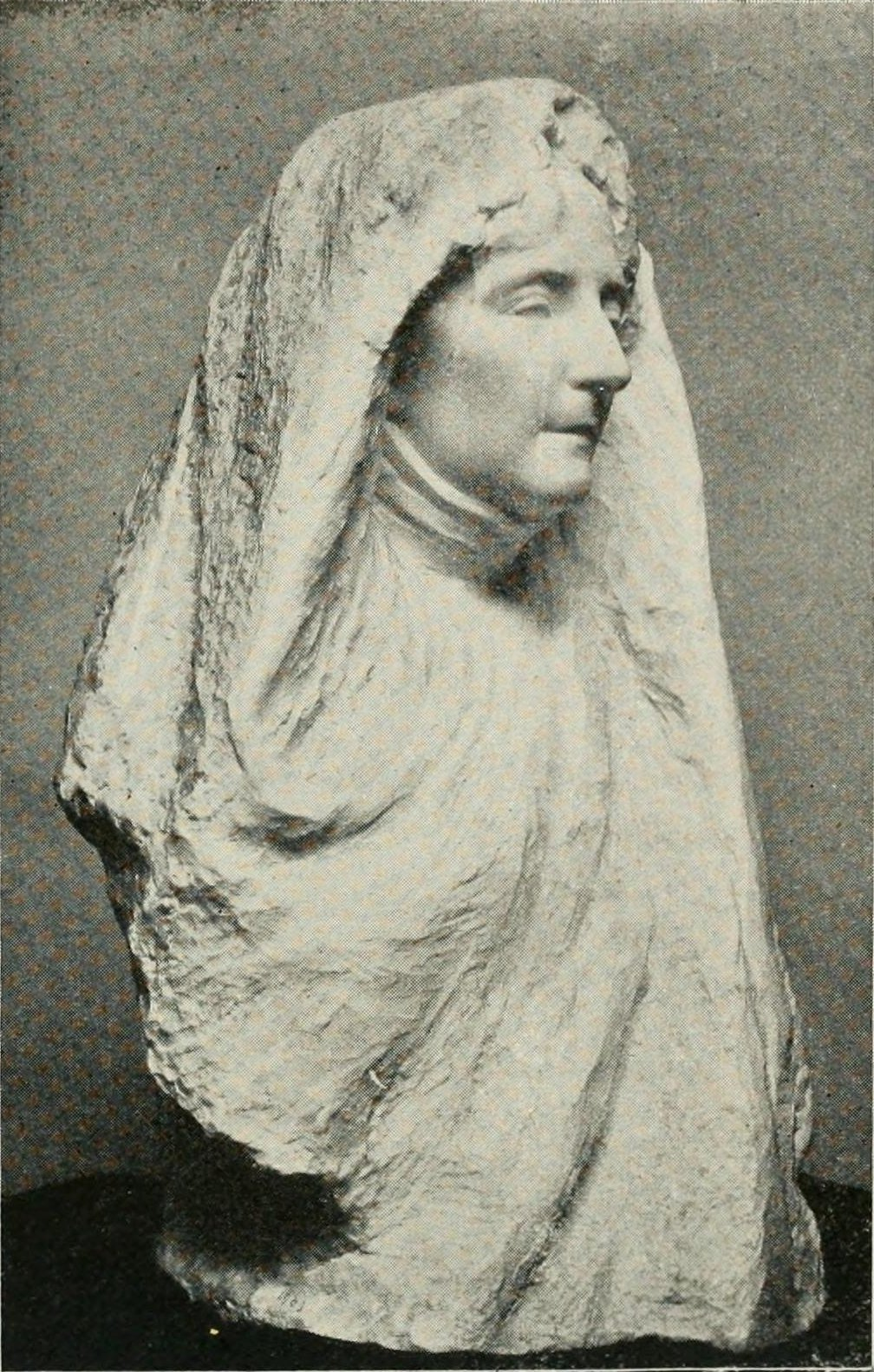
Grand Deuil, 1903

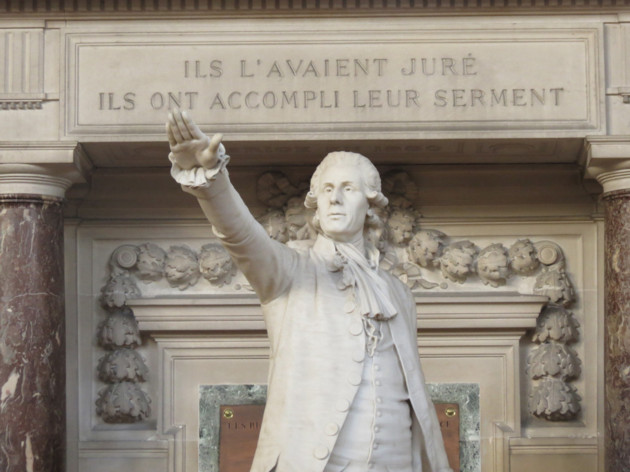
Statue of Bailly, 19th century, Musée du Jeu de Paume

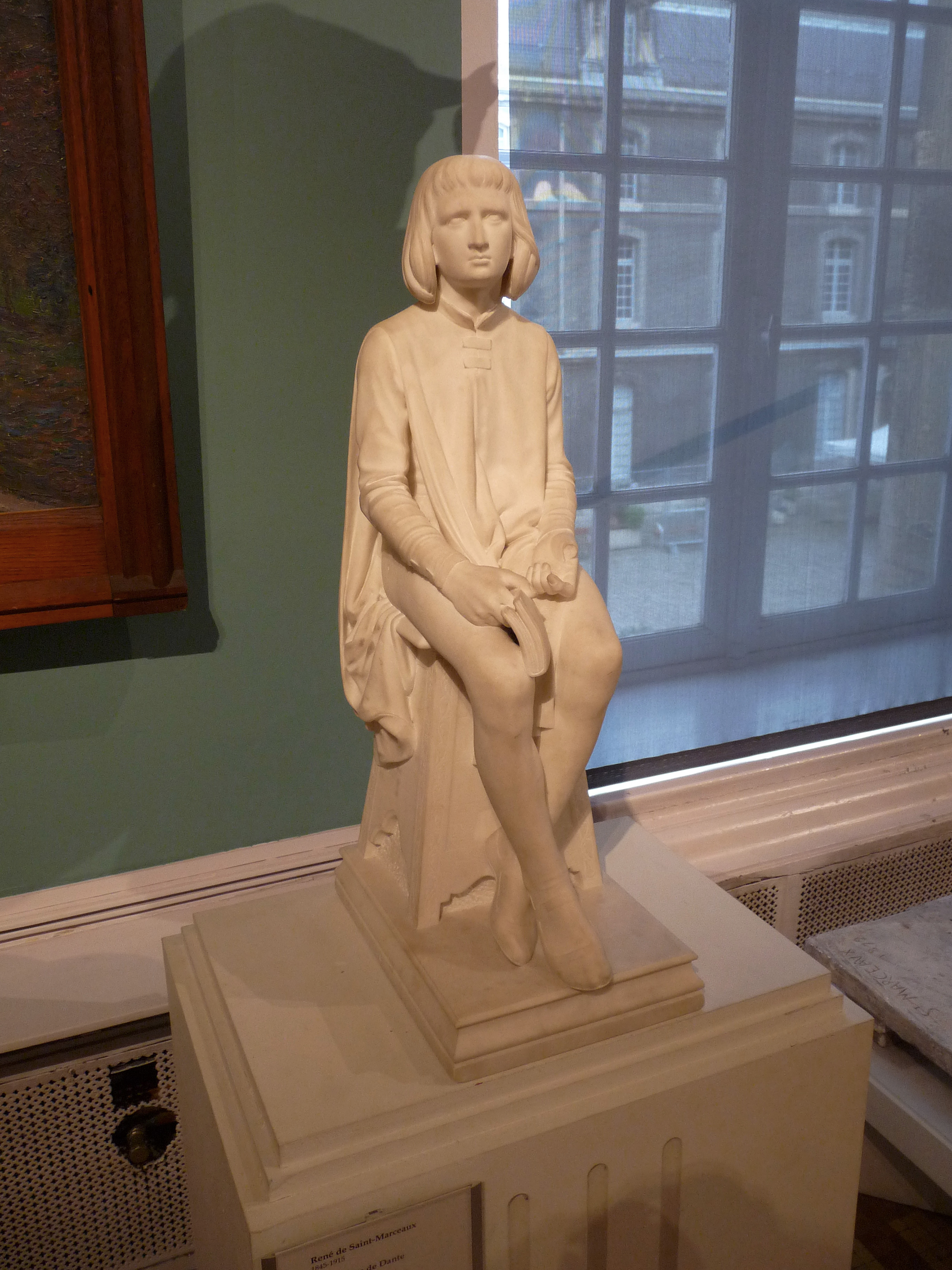
La Jeunesse de Dante, Musée des beaux-arts, Reims

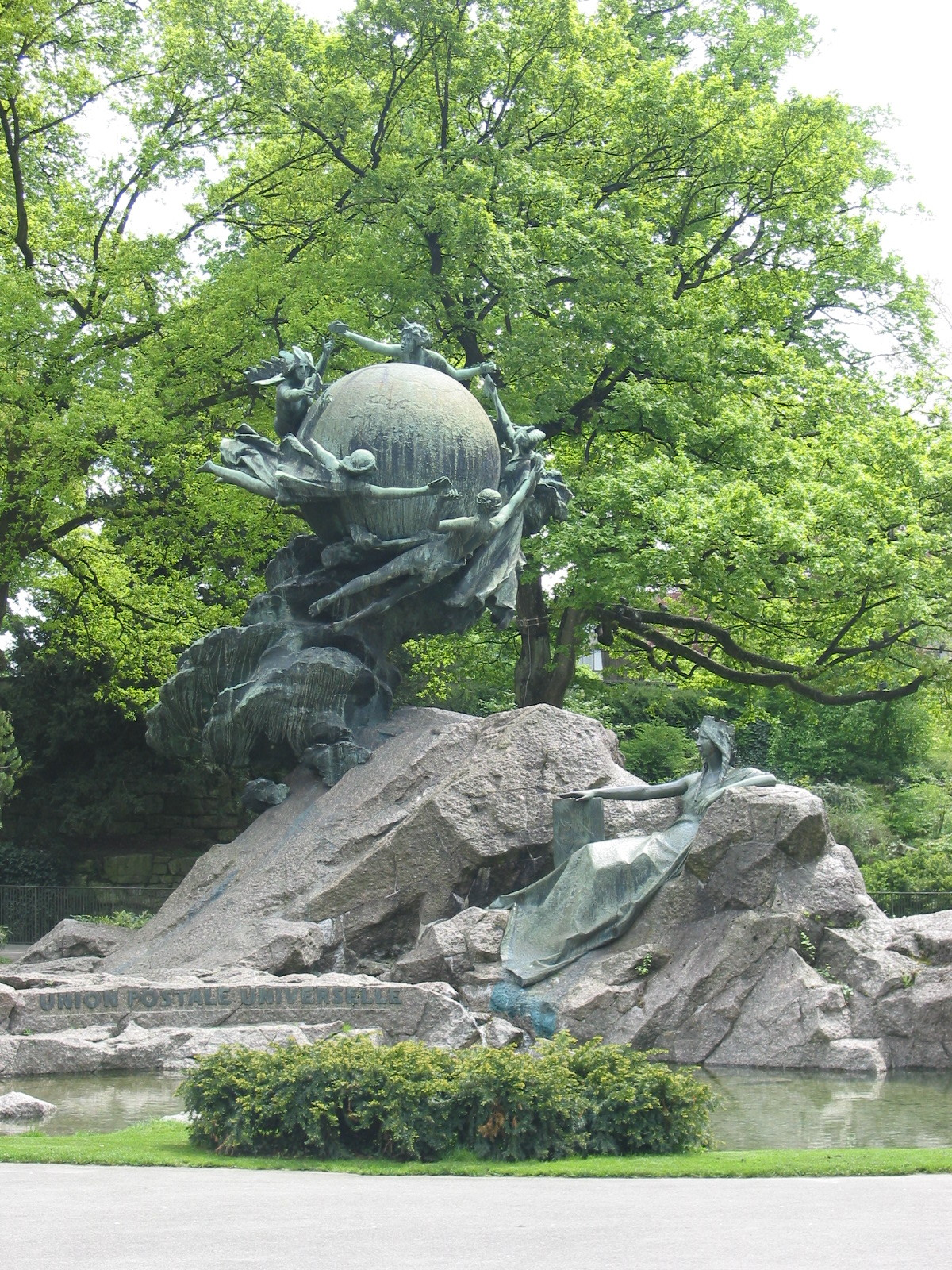
UPU monument, 1909, Bern, Switzerland
