= List of operas by Jules Massenet =

This is a complete list of operas by the French composer Jules Massenet (1842–1912). Several of Massenet's operas were premiered by the Opéra-Comique in Paris, first at the second Salle Favart (Favart 2), followed by the Théâtre Lyrique on the Place du Châtelet (Lyrique), and then the third Salle Favart (Favart 3).

== List ==
Operas by Jules Massenet
Title	Genre	Acts	Libretto	Premiere	
Title	Genre	Acts	Libretto	Date	Venue
Esméralda	opéra		after Victor Hugo, Notre-Dame de Paris	composed c. 1865, but unfinished	
La coupe du roi de Thulé	opéra	3 acts	Édouard Blau and Louis Gallet, based on Goethe's 1774 poem "Der König in Thule"	composed c. 1866, but unperformed	
La grand'tante	opéra comique	1 act	Jules Adenis and Charles Granvallet	3 April 1867	Paris, Opéra-Comique (Favart 2)
Manfred	opéra		Jules Ruelle, after Byron's Manfred	composed c. 1869, but unfinished	
Méduse		3 acts	Michel Carré	composed 1870	
Don César de Bazan	opéra comique	3 acts	Adolphe d'Ennery, Philippe François Pinel Dumanoir and Jules Chantepie, after Victor Hugo, Ruy Blas	30 November 1872, revised 20 January 1888	Paris, Opéra-Comique (Favart 2); revision Geneva
L'adorable Bel'-Boul	opérette	1 act	Louis Gallet	17 April 1874	Paris, Cercle des Mirlitons
Les templiers				composed c. 1875, but lost	
Bérangère et Anatole	sainete	1 act	Henri Meilhac and Paul Poirson	February 1876	Paris, Cercle de l'Union artistique
Le roi de Lahore	opéra	5 acts	Louis Gallet	27 April 1877	Paris, Opéra Garnier
Robert de France	drame lyrique			composed c. 1880, but unperformed, lost	
Les Girondins	opéra			composed 1881, lost	
Hérodiade; rev. as: Erodiade	opéra	3 acts; rev.: 4 acts	Paul Milliet and Georges Hartmann, after Gustave Flaubert, Hérodias, Nr. 3 der Trois Contes	19 December 1881, revised 1 February 1884,	Brussels, Théâtre de la Monnaie, revision Paris, Théâtre Italien
Manon	opéra comique	5 acts	Henri Meilhac and Philippe Gille, after Antoine François Prévost, L'histoire du chevalier Des Grieux et de Manon Lescaut	19 January 1884	Paris, Opéra-Comique (Favart 2)
Le Cid	opéra	4 acts	Adolphe d'Ennery, Louis Gallet and Édouard Blau, after Pierre Corneille	30 November 1885	Paris, Opéra Garnier
Esclarmonde	opéra romanesque	4 acts	Alfred Blau and Louis-Ferdinand de Gramont	15 May 1889	Paris, Opéra Comique (Lyrique)
Le mage	opéra	5 acts	Jean Richepin	16 March 1891	Paris, Opéra Garnier
Werther	drame lyrique	4 acts	Édouard Blau, Paul Milliet and Georges Hartmann, after Johann Wolfgang von Goethe, Die Leiden des jungen Werther (German translation for Vienna: Max Kalbeck)	16 February 1892 (in German), 16 January 1893 (in French)	Vienna, Hofopera; Paris, Opéra-Comique (Lyrique)
Thaïs	opéra	3 acts	Louis Gallet, after the novel of the same name by Anatole France	16 March 1894, revised 13 April 1898	Paris, Opéra Garnier (and revised)
Le portrait de Manon	opéra comique	1 act	Georges Boyer	8 May 1894	Paris, Opéra-Comique (Lyrique)
La Navarraise	épisode lyrique	2 acts	Jules Claretie and Henri Cain, after Claretie, La cigarette	20 June 1894	London, Royal Opera House Covent Garden
Sapho	pièce lyrique	5 acts	Henri Cain and Arthur Bernède, after Alphonse Daudet	7 November 1897, revised 22 January 1909	Paris, Opéra-Comique (Lyrique); revised Opéra-Comique (Favart 3);
Cendrillon	conte de fées	4 acts	Henri Cain, after Charles Perrault, Cendrillon ou La Petite Pantoufle	24 May 1899	Paris, Opéra-Comique (Favart 3)
Grisélidis	conte lyrique	prologue and 3 acts	Armand Silvestre and Eugène Morand	20 November 1901	Paris, Opéra-Comique (Favart 3)
Le jongleur de Notre-Dame	miracle	3 acts	Maurice Léna, after Anatole France, L'etui de nacre	18 February 1902	Monte Carlo, Opéra
Chérubin	comédie chantée	3 acts	François de Croisset and Henri Cain	14 February 1905	Monte Carlo, Opéra
Ariane	opéra	5 acts	Catulle Mendès	31 October 1906	Paris, Opéra Garnier
Thérèse	drame musical	2 acts	Jules Claretie	7 February 1907	Monte Carlo, Opéra
Bacchus	opéra	4 acts	Catulle Mendès	5 May 1909	Paris, Opéra Garnier
Don Quichotte	comédie héroïque	5 acts	Henri Cain, after Jacques Le Lorrain, Le chevalier de la longue figure	19 February 1910	Monte Carlo, Opéra
Roma	opéra tragique	5 acts	Henri Cain, after A. Parodi, Roma vaincue	17 February 1912	Monte Carlo, Opéra
Panurge	haulte farce musical	3 acts	Maurice Boukay and Georges Spitzmüller, after François Rabelais, La vie inestimable de Gargantua and Faits et dits héroïques du grand Pantagruel	25 April 1913	Paris, Théâtre de la Gaîté
Cléopâtre	opéra	4 acts	Louis Payen (A. Liénard)	23 February 1914	Monte Carlo, Opéra composed c. 1895
Amadis	opéra légendaire	4 acts	Jules Claretie	1 April 1922 (composed c. 1895)	Monte Carlo, Opéra
