= Let's Get a Divorce =

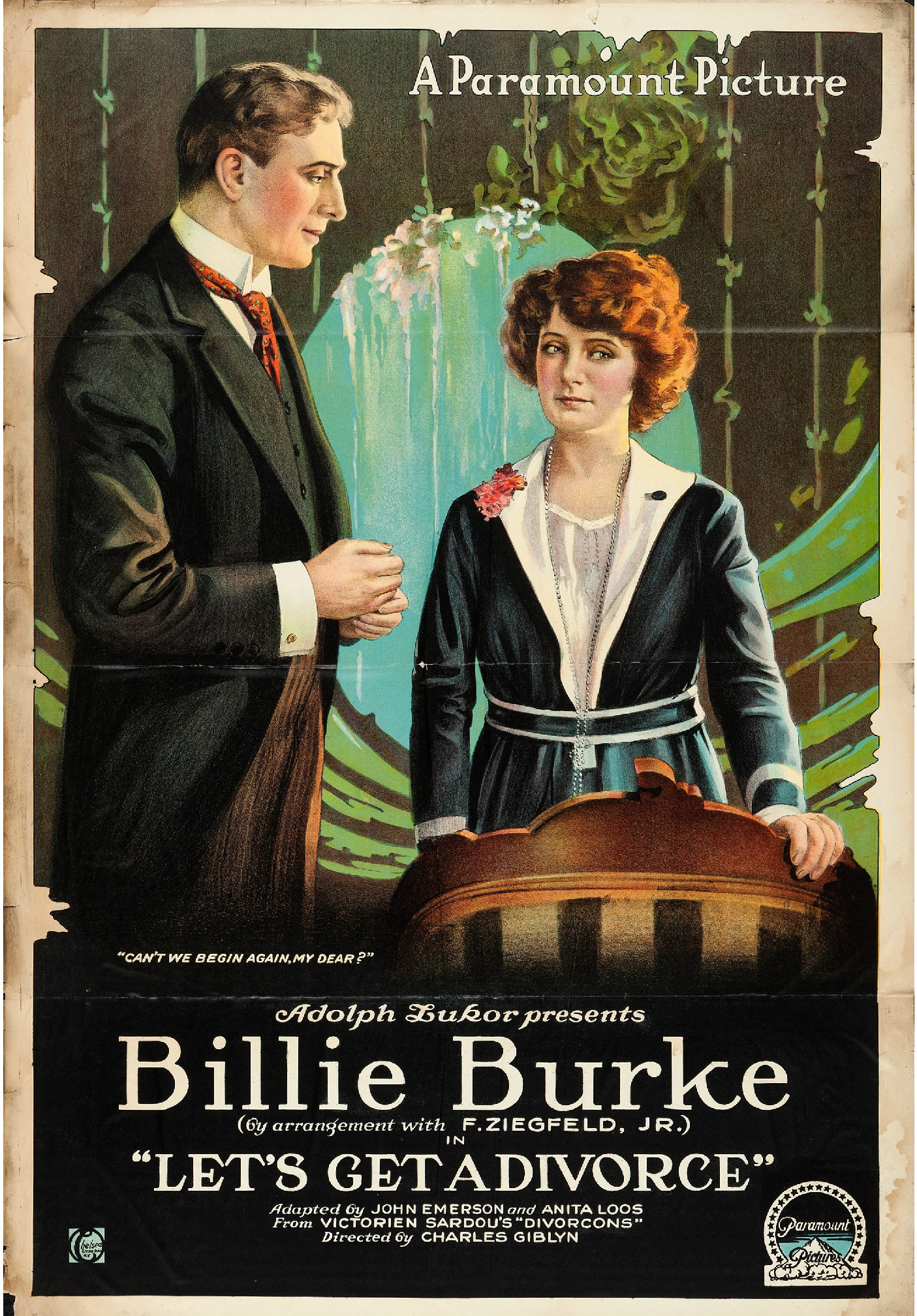
- Film poster
- Directed by: Charles Giblyn
- Written by: John Emerson (scenario); Anita Loos (scenario)
- Based on: Divorçons by Victorien Sardou and Émile de Najac
- Produced by: Adolph Zukor; Jesse L. Lasky
- Starring: Billie Burke
- Cinematography: Hal Young
- Production company: Famous Players–Lasky
- Distributed by: Paramount Pictures
- Release date: April 28, 1918
- Running time: 50 minutes
- Country: United States
- Language: Silent (English intertitles)

Let's Get a Divorce is a 1918 American silent comedy film starring Billie Burke and written for the screen by husband and wife team John Emerson and Anita Loos. The film was produced by the Famous Players–Lasky company and distributed through Paramount Pictures. The film is based on the popular stage play Divorçons by Victorien Sardou and Émile de Najac.

== Plot ==
As described in a film magazine, Cyprienne Marcey, who eats, dreams, and writes romance, picks out Henri, the brother of her roommate, as the object of her affections. Following their spectacular elopement, Henri's attempt to return to writing is a jolt to her romantic temperament. Seeing in Henri's cousin Adhemar the soul of romance, she asks Henri for a divorce so that she might marry Adhemar. Henri agrees, but once the clandestine aspect of her love affair with Adhemar is removed, it soon palls on her. On the night before the day set for her divorce she persuades her husband to take her to dinner and away from Adhemar. When the latter breaks into their private dining room with the police, he is denounced by Cyprienne who emphatically states that Henri, her husband, is the only man she ever loved.

== Cast ==
- Billie Burke as Madame Cyprienne Marcey
- John Miltern as Henri de Prunelles
- Pinna Nesbit as Yvonne de Prunelles
- Armand Kaliz as Adhemar
- Rod La Rocque as Chauffeur
- Helen Tracy as Mother Superior
- John Merkyl as Calvignac (credited as Wilmuth Merkyl)
- Cesare Gravina as Head Waiter

== Preservation status ==
With no holdings located in archives, Let's Get a Divorce is considered to be a lost film.

== See also ==
- Kiss Me Again (1925)
- That Uncertain Feeling (1941)
