= Lukie D =

- Born: Michael Kennedy; 1972 (age 52–53)
- Origin: Cockburn Pen, Jamaica
- Genres: Dancehall
- Occupation: Singer
- Years active: 1993–present

Lukie D (born Michael Kennedy, 1972, Cockburn Pen, Jamaica) is a dancehall singer and deejay. He is known for his singing and powerful vocal range and soulful voice rather than toasting style, which fits with the prominent theme of love in his songs. Kennedy began his career performing on various local sound systems, building a reputation as a dancehall singer. His influences included Frankie Paul, Tenor Saw and ragga DJ Supercat. Lukie D songs and writing has mainly fitted reggae music but being versatile has also been put on R n B / Dancehall / Soul / Pop making him unique in his field, with the majority of his tracks written by himself

His recording sessions produced his biggest hit, "Centre Of Attraction", alongside combination hits with Lieutenant Stitchie ("Don't Deny Me") and Beenie Man and Black Pearl ("Bag It Up"). Lukie D joined the Firehouse Crew, noted for fostering the careers of Luciano and Sizzla. While with the Firehouse Crew he released his debut, "Centre Of Attraction", featuring combinations with Mikey Spice and DJ Determine. He also released a series of hits, including "I Won't Let You Go", "Lonely Nights", "Let Me Love You Now", "Heavy Load" and "You've Got It Going". His success allowed him to commute between Jamaica and the United States, where he became acquainted with more diverse musical influences, resulting in the broadening of his repertoire. In 1997 he released a 20-track compilation featuring cover versions of AC/DC's "You Shook Me" and Queen's "We Will Rock You".

As well as his solo career, Lukie D is a part of the vocal group L.U.S.T. with fellow singers Thriller U, Singing Melody and Tony Curtis, They have recorded two albums also toured, They performed at MIDEM 1998 and later in New York at the third Culturama festival.

Lukie D is left handed.

== Discography ==
Multiple track releases

- Center of Attraction (1996)
- Be Strong (2005)
- Deliver Me (2006)
- Who's That Girl (2008)
- Love Again (2009)
- Horny (2016)
- If You Leave Me Now (EP) (2018)
- Bargained For (EP) (2018)
