= Gismonda =

Greek-set melodrama by Victorien Sardou

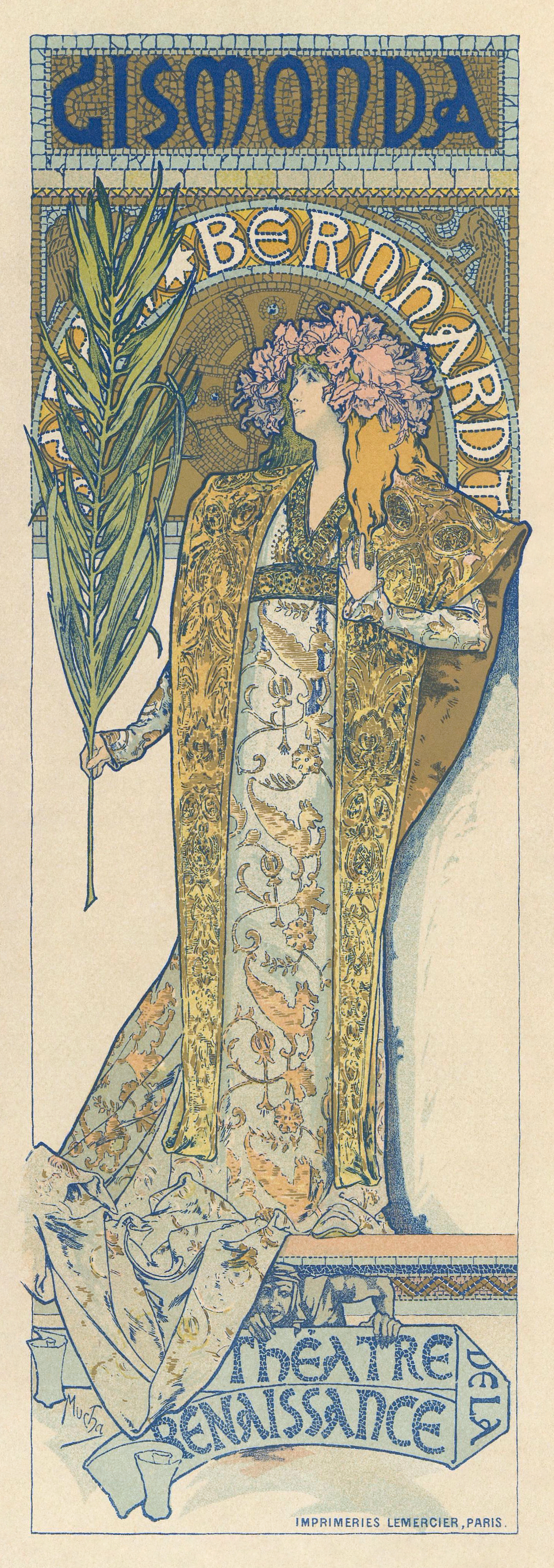
- Alphonse Mucha poster for Gismonda starring Sarah Bernhardt (1894)
- Original language: French
- Written by: Victorien Sardou
- Characters: Gismonda; Marcello Almerio; Zaccaria Franco Acciaiuoli; Leonardo De Tocco; Gregoras Drakos; Agnello Acciaiuoli; Francesco; Leonarda
- Genre: Melodrama
- Setting: 15th Century Athens during Florentine rule

Premiere
- Date: October 31, 1894
- Place: Théâtre de la Renaissance, Paris

Gismonda is a Greek-set melodrama in four acts by Victorien Sardou that premiered on October 31, 1894 at the Théâtre de la Renaissance. In 1918, the play was adapted for the now lost film Love's Conquest. In 1918/1919, it was adapted into the opera Gismonda by Henry Février.

== Plot ==
=== Act I ===
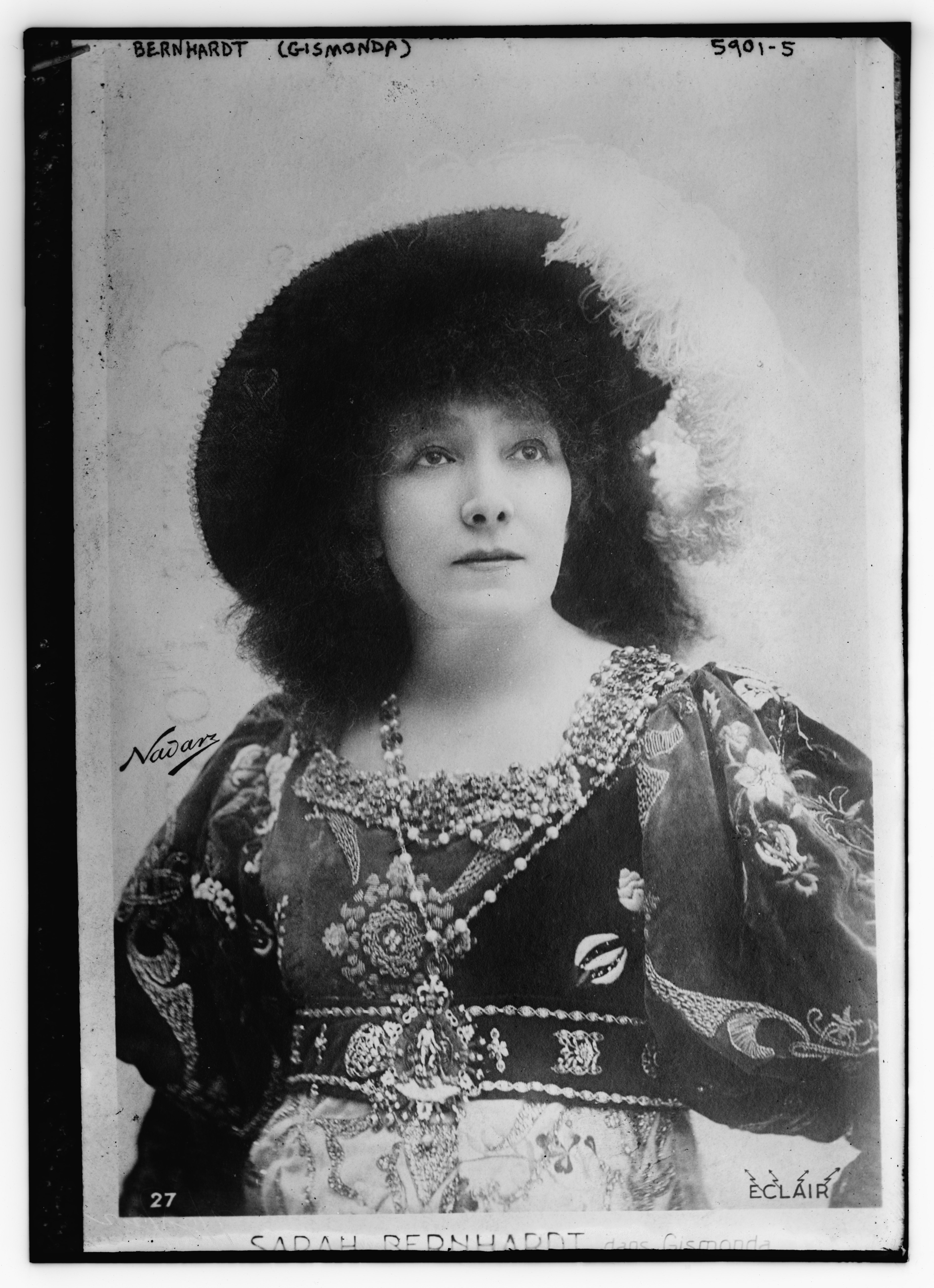
Photograph of Sarah Bernhardt as Gismonda (1894)

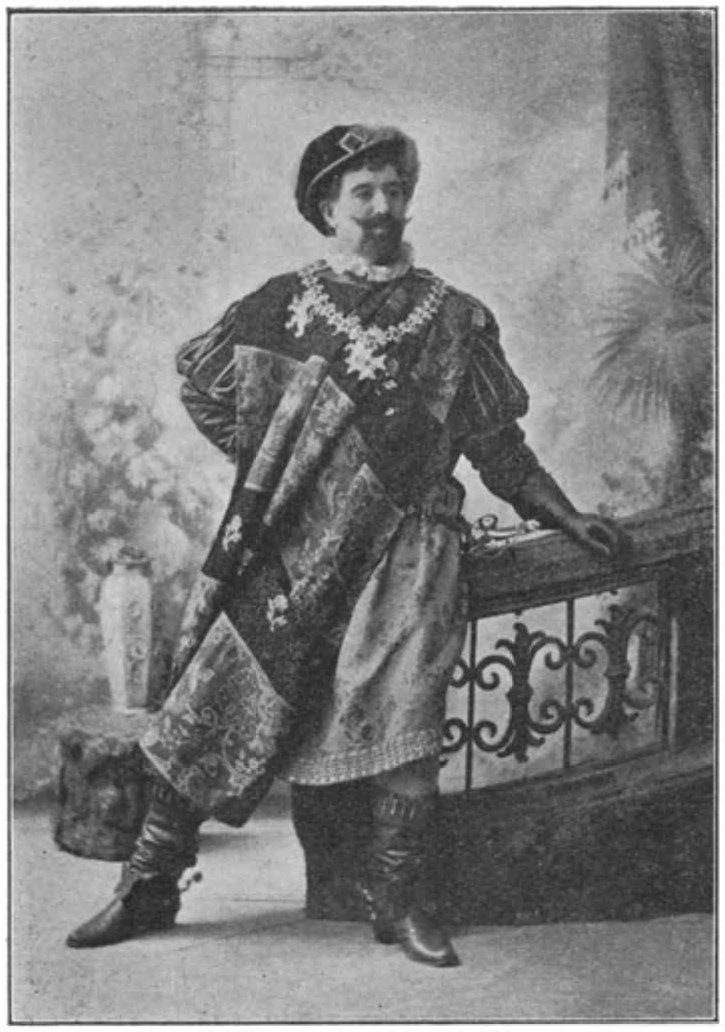
Photograph of C. C. van Schoonhoven as Zaccaria (1899)

Act I starts in 1451 in Athens at the foot of the Acropolis.

In the opening act, we find Gismonda, the widow of the Duke of Athens, and the mother of his child, a five-year-old boy named Francesco. Gismonda is the ruling power of the duchy as regent for her son, an absolute monarch. She is surrounded by a flattering court, among whom is a Venetian, named Zaccaria Franco, who loved the Duchess before she married the Duke of Athens. He is seemingly one of her strongest supporters, but is actually trying to seize power for himself. Zaccaria is in league with the Turks, who support him in his plotting against the duchy. Gismonda's young son Francesco, the heir to the duchy, stands between Zaccaria and his ambitions. So Zaccaria has conspired with an accomplice, Gregoras Drakos, to murder the boy.

In the opening scene, a cross stands in the center of the stage and a crowd is surging about it. Presently Agnello, a young nephew of the Duchess Gismonda, enters. He looks down at a tiger in a pit, preferring to keep his distance from it, and discusses a statue of Aphrodite, next to the cross, with some comrades. Zaccaria and his accomplice Gregoras appear. They plan to lure Francesco, Gismonda's son, to the edge of the pit, and shove him in, making it look like an accident. The excitement above has driven the captive tiger into a frenzy.

After a long scene, in which every detail of their scheme is arranged, Zaccaria and Gregoras are joined on stage by Gismonda, with Francesco and others. Gismonda says that she does not like the statue of Aphrodite. A bishop passes by, and he agrees that the statue is inappropriate. During this talk, Gregoras has taken Francesco to the edge of the pit to show him the tiger. With a quick jostle, Francesco falls in.

Gismonda sees her son fall into the tiger pit and screams. She does not see that Gregoras pushed him in. She beseeches someone—anyone—to save her son. She offers unlimited rewards but no one is willing to risk almost certain death to rescue the boy. At last a man takes a poignard and goes to the child's rescue. The tiger crouches ready to seize his prey and the man leaps into the pit.

Gismonda prays for help at the foot of the cross. The others describe the conflict in the pit. The man stabs the tiger in the eye. The point of the dagger goes through to its brain and the tiger dies.

Joyful, Gismonda hugs Francesco, and vows before God to marry and share her duchy with the man who saved her son. No one knows the man, who turns out to be Almerio, a commoner. When she hears this, Gismonda's gratitude begins to cool. Her child is safe, and she has no desire to marry a commoner. The bishop reminds her of her promise. Gismonda tells the bishop that he need not remind her of her oath; it is impossible to fulfill it.

The entire play revolves around this vow.

Gismonda kindly and patronizingly thanks Almerio, and begins to look for a loophole out of her promise. She decides to appeal to the Pope. Almerio, however, wants her to live up to her vow. Gismonda promises him whatever he wants, except herself and her duchy.

"Vous avez promis et j'insiste que vous tiendrez votre promesse (You promised and I insist that you keep your word)," Almerio says.

The curtain falls as Gismonda is hurrying away with her child.

=== Act II ===
The second act begins in the Convent of Daphne, where Gismonda has gone into a retreat with her son, Francesco. The boy is ill with a strange fever that comes on every evening and breaks every morning.

Rumors circulate, even in the convent, that during Easter week Gismonda will marry Almerio, the man who has saved the life of her son. A character tells how Almerio was treated for his injuries in the palace, and that the courtiers learned to admire the handsome, brave man. Almerio had been a falconer at the ducal palace and loved Gismonda long before she ever knew of his existence. Gismonda, meanwhile, is eagerly awaiting an answer from the Pope about whether her vow can be absolved.

Many calamities have fallen upon the people of Athens lately, and they have blamed Gismonda. In breaking a pledge made in the sight of God, it is said she is bringing disaster upon the country. Half of the lower part of the city is flooded, cholera is raging, a cross has blown off a church, and, worst of all, pirates have landed at Marathon.

A noble offered an estate and the title of duke to the man who will bring before him the head of the pirate leader. Almerio took two hundred men and marched on Marathon. He defeated the pirates and beheaded their leader. As a reward, Almerio became the Count of Sonla.

Gismonda fears all suitors. She thinks they are in love with her duchy, not with her. There is only one man she thinks, perhaps, she can trust—Zaccaria. At this point, Zaccaria enters. He pleads his love for Gismonda, in vain.

The bishop comes in and tells Gismonda that the Pope insists that Gismonda must keep her vow and marry Almerio, or else she must be the spouse of Christ, that is, a nun.

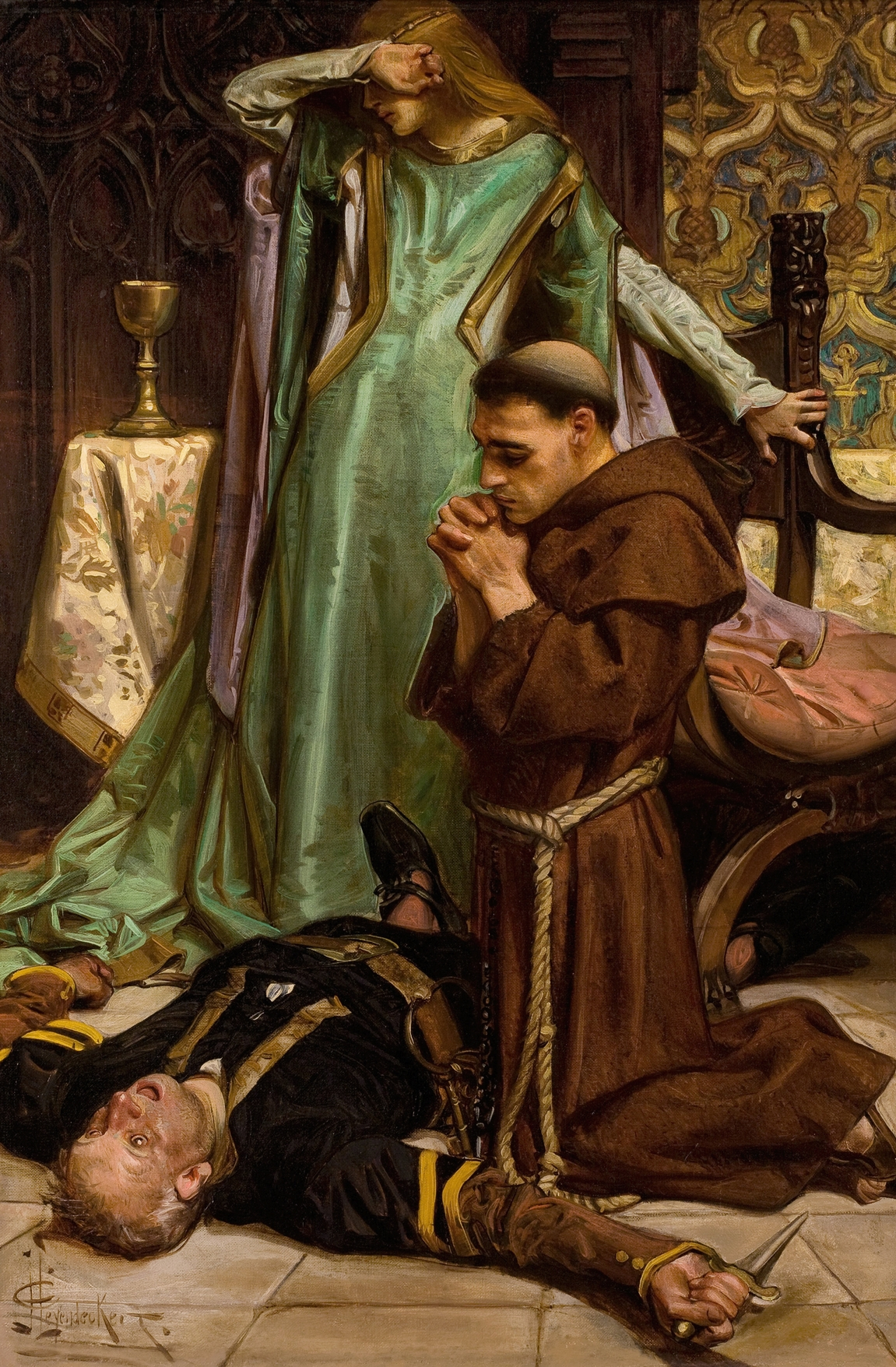
The Rescue of Gismonda

Almerio's triumphal approach is heard. The populace is bearing him, a conquering hero, to the convent. Zaccaria and the barons see that the gates are tightly closed against the approaching procession. Almerio and the barons all draw their swords. "Stop!" Gismonda commands, and orders Almerio to give up his sword. Zaccaria wants Almerio to be taken prisoner, but Gismonda forbids it, calling him sacred.

"Voilà un homme! (There is a man!)," she says, looking at Almerio with pride.

=== Act III ===
This act takes place in Gismonda's private apartment in her palace.

The Athenian populace is not pleased that their Duchess does not keep her vow. The sympathy of the people is with Almerio. The barons, Gismonda's followers, jeer at Almerio's presumption. Gismonda tells a doctor that she imagines she sees Almerio everywhere. The doctor thinks it is her conscience bothering her, and advises prayer rather than medicine.

The next day is a feast day and Zaccaria worries that the people, who support Almerio, might begin an uprising. The barons propose different ways that Almerio might be killed, but Gismonda rejects them.

Almerio is quietly brought to Gismonda's room. She notices that he is very handsome, but she still does not want to marry him. She offers him money and a barony, but Almerio says the only thing he wants is to marry Gismonda. He tells her that he did not save Francesco to become Duke of Athens, but just to win Gismonda's love. He offers to give up his dukedom and even his claim to marry Gismonda if he can become her lover. Gismonda agrees, and makes him promise to publicly absolve her from her vow.

=== Act IV ===
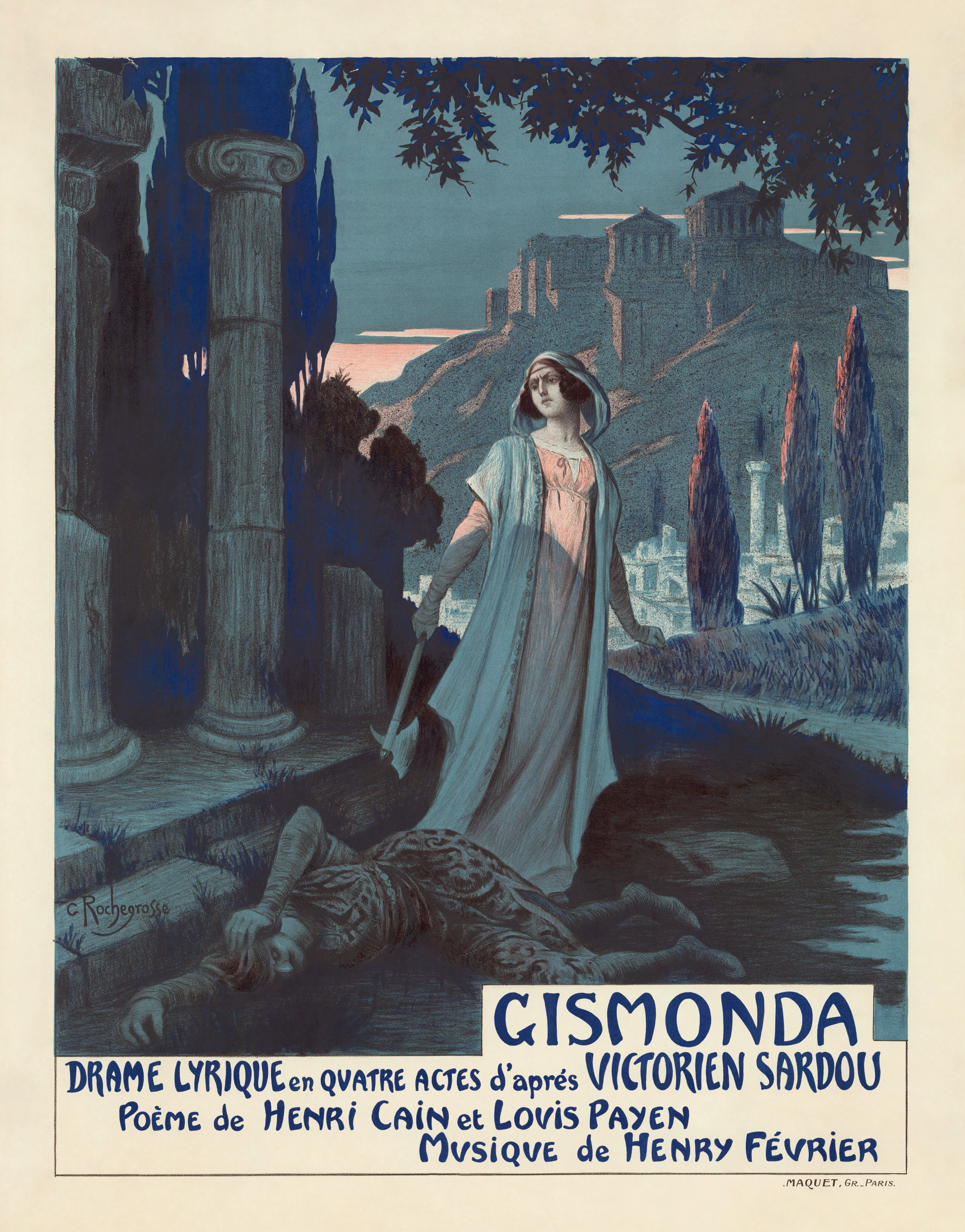
Poster for Henry Février's opera of the same name based on the play.

The act begins near Almerio's cabin. Gismonda has kept her promise to be Almerio's lover, and is leaving his cabin. Her maid, Thisbe, has followed here and confronts her. Thisbe asks if Gismonda has fallen in love with Almerio. "Oui, mon âme et mon corps sont à lui, et je me méprise pour ma folie. (Yes, body and soul, I am his; and I hate myself for it)," Gismonda confesses.

Gregoras and Zaccaria approach. Gismonda and Thisbe hide. Zaccaria wants Gregoras to kill Almerio in his sleep, but Gregoras hesitates.

"Un homme qui dort ne donne pas de peine (A sleeping man is no trouble at all)," Zaccaria urges.

"Il est plus facile de pousser un enfant dans un trou que de tuer un homme, grand et fort comme Almério (It is easier to push the child into the tiger's pit than to kill a big strong man like this Almerio)," Gregoras answers.

He drops his hatchet and runs. Zaccaria calls after him that he'll kill Almerio and the child, Francesco, himself. At this, Gismonda takes the hatchet and attacks Zaccaria, screaming, "Vous avez donné mon fils au tigre; je vous donne à l’enfer! (You sent my son to the tiger; I'll send you to Hell!)" Almerio wakes up and comes out, offering to deliver the coup de grace. Gismonda refuses, and, making sure Zaccaria can see and hear her, tells him that she loves Almerio as Zaccaria slowly and painfully dies.

The second scene of the last act takes place in a church.

The news comes of Zaccaria's death. The people of Athens are outside carrying palms, demanding that Gismonda announce her marriage to Almerio. Almerio enters sadly. He is about to fulfill his vow and give up the only woman he has ever loved. As he is absolving Gismonda of her pledge, Gregoras enters, accusing him of having murdered Zaccaria. Almerio takes the blame for the murder, lest Gismonda have to admit why she was at his cabin in the night, and the barons urge Gismonda to sentence Almerio to death. Gismonda, in turn, accuses Gregoras of having thrown her son to the tiger, at the order of Zaccaria, and of meaning to kill Almerio. Gregoras returns that he refused to kill the man, thus inadvertently betraying himself.

Gregoras is taken away, a prisoner. Gismonda fearlessly admits to having killed Zaccaria herself, and to her affair with Almerio. She recognizes Almerio's honor and bravery and asks him to forgive her and to become her husband. Almerio is only too happy to marry Gismonda, and to become father to Francesco and the new duke of Athens. The people praise their new leader and the organ plays "Gloria."

== Production ==
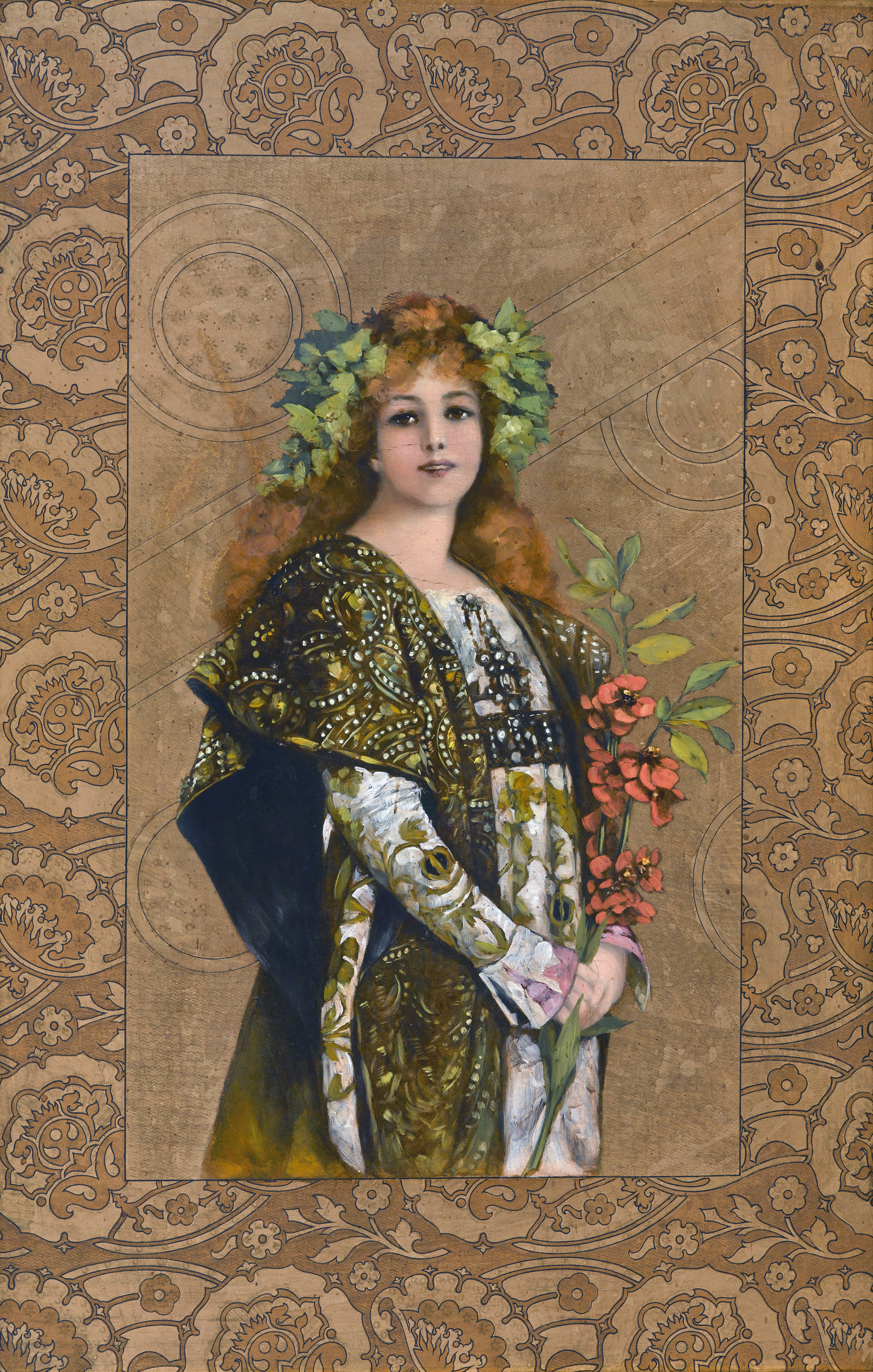
Sarah Bernhardt in Gismonda

The original production starred Sarah Bernhardt as Gismonda and Lucien Guitry as Almerio. The show would go to Broadway at the Fifth Avenue Theatre on December 11, 1894, and end in February 1895. The set design was by Joseph Clare, D. Frank Dodge, Homer Emens, Richard Marston, and Ernest Albert.

Another notable production of the play took place in 1899 at the prestigious Academy of Music, Montreal, starring American actress Blanche Walsh and American stage actor Melbourne McDowell. The actors performances were universally praised, with Sardou himself hailed as "a master in the delineation of all the phases of human passion, and he is fearless in the treatment of questions that less skillful playwriters avoid." The costumes became equally famous, in particular the $50,000 head-girdle worn by Blanche consisting of diamonds, rubies, emeralds, and sapphires set into network of gold.
