= Joseph Clare =

English scenic designer and painter

Joseph Clare (1846–1917) was an English scenic designer and painter of the Pre-Raphaelite movement. The Concise Oxford Companion to American Theatre stated that during his lifetime "[Clare] gained the reputation of possibly the finest set designer in America, with his settings admired for their elegance and proper sense of period."

== Life and career ==
Born in England in 1846, Joseph Clare apprenticed as a scenic designer at the Royal Court Theatre in Liverpool. He then worked for five years as a resident scenic designer at the Theatre Royal, Portsmouth where he had particular success designing sets for several stage adaptations of novels by Charles Dickens. During his first year at that theatre in 1865, he met and befriended Dickens; maintaining a close relationship with the author until Dickens's death in 1870.

In 1871 Clare was brought to the United States by the theatre impresario Lester Wallack, and was a resident scenic designer at Broadway's Wallack's Theatre until the company disbanded in 1887. In 1894 he designed the sets for the Broadway premiere of Victorien Sardou's Gismonda at the Fifth Avenue Theatre.

Clare died on June 3, 1917 at the age of 71 in Central Islip, New York.
