= Don't Tell the Wife =

Don't Tell the Wife may refer to:

- Don't Tell the Wife (1937 film), an American comedy film
- Don't Tell the Wife (1927 film), an American silent romantic comedy film
