= Divorçons =

French play by Victorien Sardou and Émile de Najac

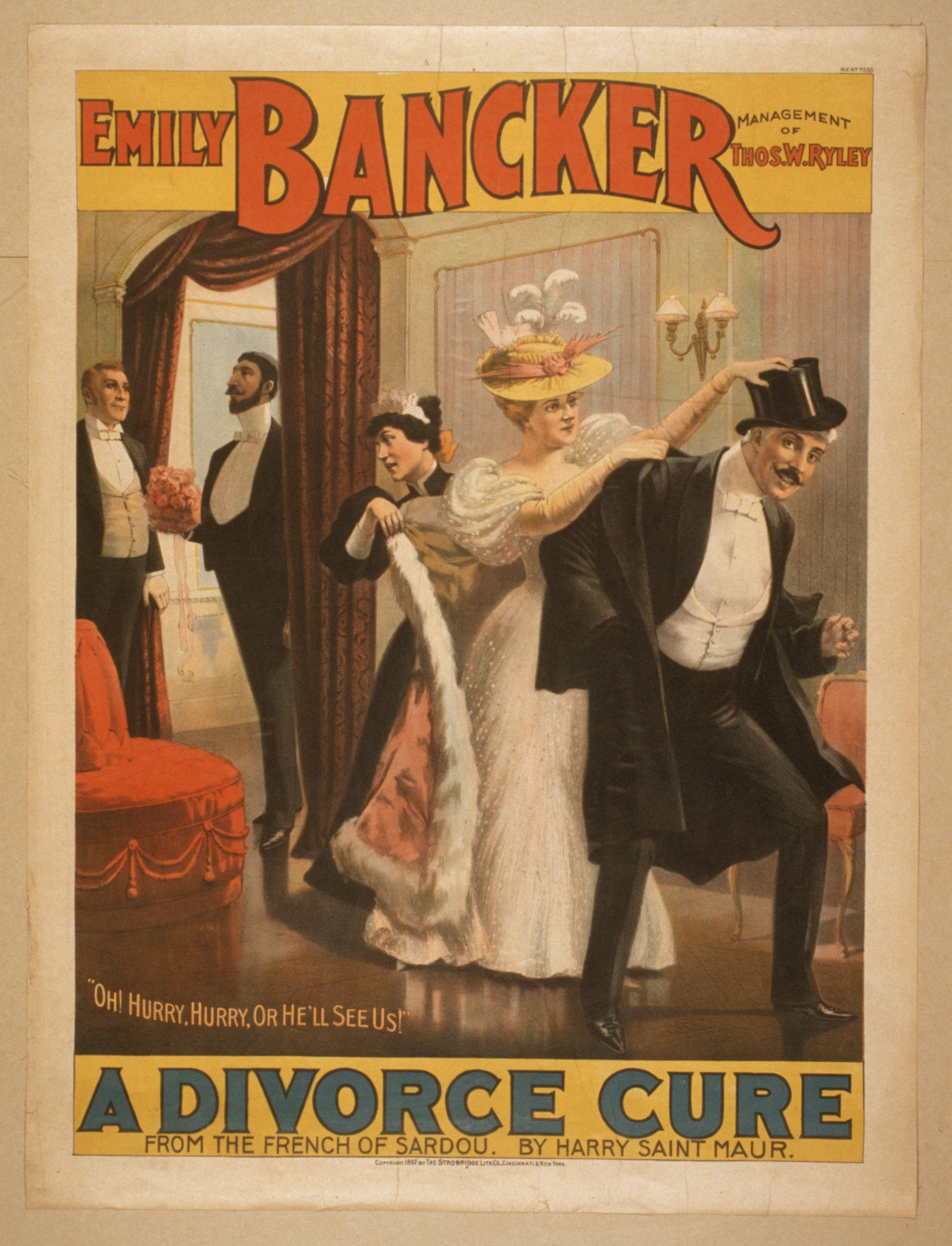

Divorçons is a French play by Victorien Sardou and Émile de Najac produced in 1880. A farcical comedy about seeking a divorce, it had theatrical runs over the following decades in England and the United States. It is about a young wife who wants to divorce her husband for a handsome ne'er do well. It was adapted into various films.

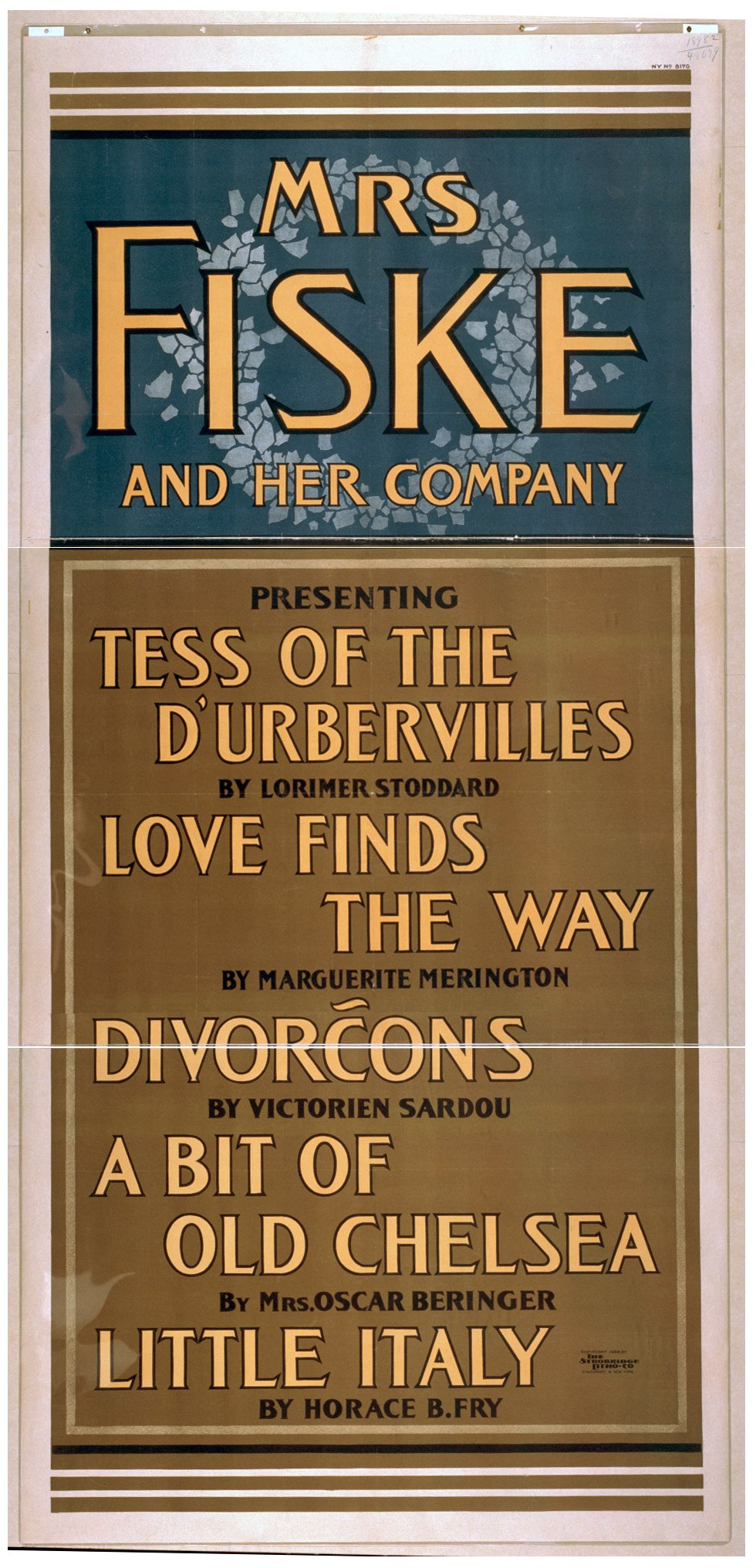
An 1898 poster for Mrs. Fiske and her company, presenting Tess of the D'Urbervilles by Lorimer Stoddard, Love finds the way by Marguerite Merington, Divorćons by Victorien Sardou, A Bit of Old Chelsea by Mrs. Oscar Baringer, Little Italy by Horace B. Fry; LCCN 2014637440

== Inspiration ==
The play was inspired by plans of the French government to legalize divorce. Legal divorce in France was established by law on 27 July 1884.

== Plot ==
Its set in Reims and is about Monsieur Des Prunelles and his marriage troubles when his wife (Cyprienne) falls in love with and wants to marry another man (Adhemar) Des Prunelles discovers the relationship. Amicably he accepts his wife's wish to be divorced after they both believe a fake report about a bill having been passed legalizing divorce in France. He pretends to have dinner with another woman but this drives Cyprienne to become jealous and realize that she indeed loves her husband.

They are reconciled and the play ends on a moral tone with the adultery punished and traditional family values being upheld.

== Roles and original cast ==
Henri Des Prunelles (Daubray) -husband of Cyprienne. His main interest is scientific and mechanical experiments.

Cyprienne (Celine Chaumont) The young wife of M. de Prunelles.

Adhemar de Gratignan - Cypriennes lover

Clavignac - (Rene Luguet) A friend of Des Prunelles who is separated from his wife who is always badgering him to increase her allowance.

Bafourdin

Bastien -a servant

Josepha -a chambermaid

Madame de Brionne -friend of Cyprienne and a young widow

Mademoiselle de Lusignan -A spinster

Madame de Valfontaine

== Reception ==
The play had its premiere in 1880 at the Palais Royal and became so popular that it ran without break for nine months.

In 1881 also prompted an Italian journalist from the Messagero newspaper in the guise of a review of the play to bring up the topic and condemn the Roman Catholic movement named Opera dei Congressi which strongly opposed legalizing divorce in Italy.

When the play premiered in England it shocked reviewers by its blatant references to the female sexuality exhibited by the main female character. In translations Des Prunelles comment to his romantic rival to "not eat before lunch" (ie to not have intercourse before marriage) was bowdlerized into the more morally acceptable "do not let the present spoil the future".

Comments were also made that Celine Chaumont who originated the role portrayed the character with too much vulgarity.

The author Andre Gide who viewed an 1889 production of the play proclaimed it to be "...extremely strong and marvellously made . It even frightened me a little by its extreme boldness."

Later stagings of the play featuring Eleonora Duse and Betty Hennings were said to have toned down this aspect of the character.

In 1896 an adaption of the play was made by Herman Merivale under the name "The Queens Proctor" In this version that was said by a reviewer "to have been scrubbed of all offense" the husbsnd is transformed into Englishman, his wife and lover are Italians.

The New York Times reviewed an 1897 staging of the play. The Los Angeles Times gave a favorable review of a 1998 theatrical revival of the play.

== Adaptations ==
- Die geschiedene Frau (1908), opera
- Divorçons (1912), short film
- Divorçons (1915), short film
- Let's Get a Divorce (1918), film
- Kiss Me Again (1925), film
- Don't Tell the Wife (1927), film
- That Uncertain Feeling (1943), film
