= Gismonda (Février) =

1919 opera by Henry Février

- Grand opera by Henry Février
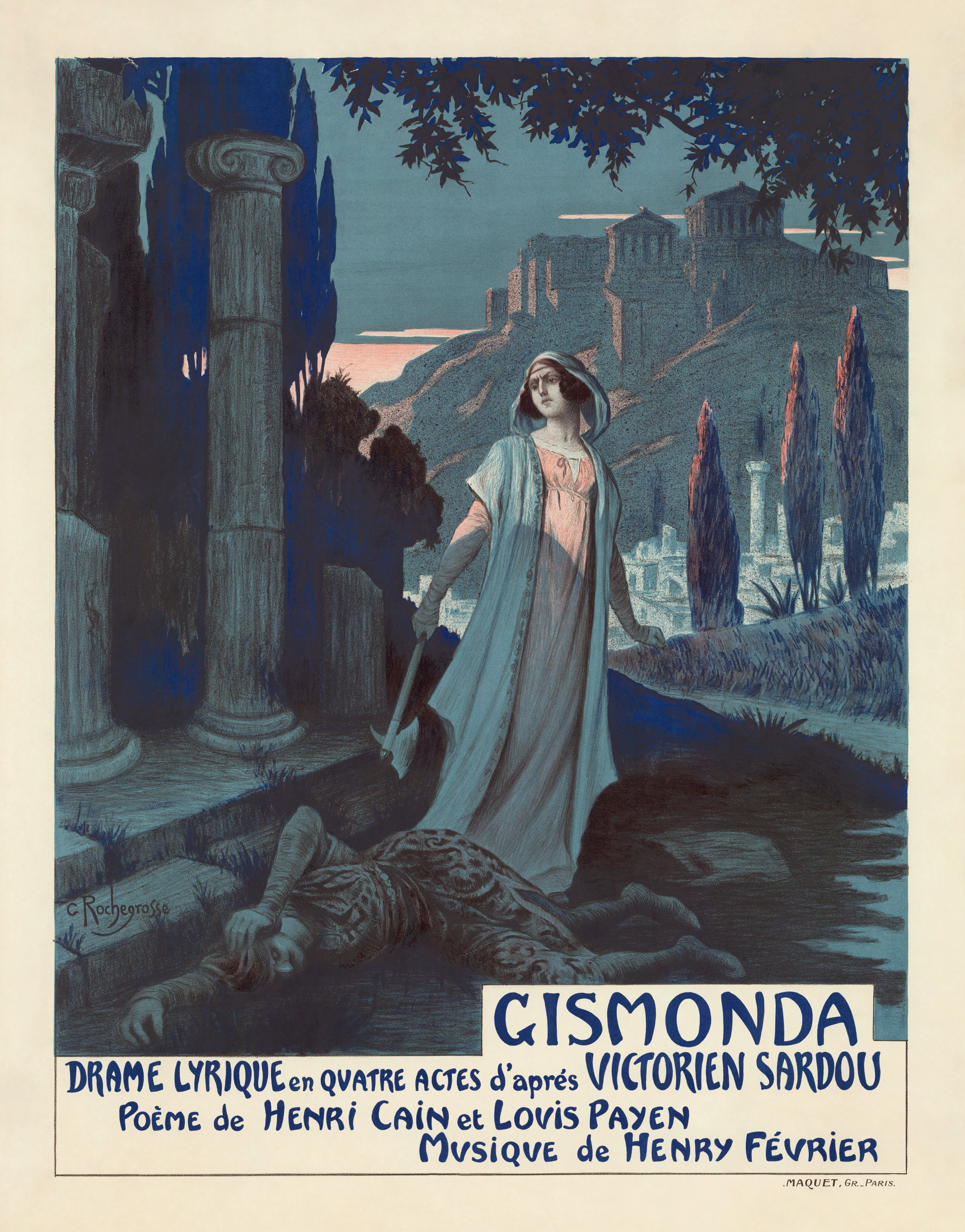
- Poster for the first performance in Paris at the Opéra-Comique on 15 October 1919.
- Librettist: Henri Caïn; Louis Payen
- Language: French
- Based on: Gismonda by Victorien Sardou
- Premiere: 14 January 1919; Chicago

Gismonda is a 1919 French-language grand opera in three acts by Henry Février to a libretto by Henri Caïn and Louis Payen based on the 1894 play Gismonda by Victorien Sardou. The planned premiere in Paris was halted by the outbreak of World War I but the composer was given leave from the French army to premiere the opera with Mary Garden in the title role with the Chicago Opera Association on 14 January 1919. Février was also present when the production was then shown in New York City at Loew's Lexington Theatre (demolished in 1960, now a hotel) on January 27 that year. It premiered in Paris at the Opéra-Comique on 15 October of the same year.

== Recordings ==
- "La Paix du cloître", Claudine Boons, soprano, Polydor about 1932
- "Oui, vous étiez l'enjeu splendide", René Lapelleterie, tenor
- "Dit-elle vrai?", Véronique Gens, soprano. Münchner Rundfunkorchester, Hervé Niquet 2017
