= Jacques Février =

French pianist and teacher (1900–1979)

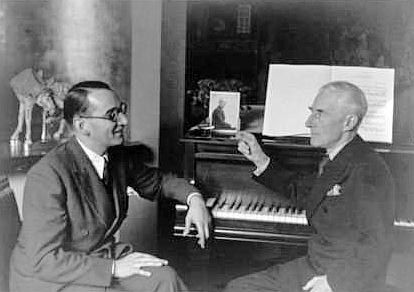
- Jacques Février (left) with composer Maurice Ravel in Paris in 1937

Background information
- Born: Jacques Février; 26 July 1900; Saint-Germain-en-Laye, France
- Died: 2 September 1979 (aged 79) Épinal, France
- Education: Conservatoire de Paris
- Genres: Classical
- Occupation: Musician
- Instrument: Piano
- Awards: Grand Prix de Disque

Jacques Février (French pronunciation: [ʒak fevʁije]; 26 July 1900 – 2 September 1979) was a French classical pianist and teacher.

== Early life ==
Jacques Février was born in Saint-Germain-en-Laye, the son of the composer Henry Février and grandson of architect Jules Février. He studied with Édouard Risler and Marguerite Long at the Conservatoire de Paris, taking a premier prix in 1921.

== Career ==
In 1932 he and the composer were the soloists in the first performance of Francis Poulenc's Concerto for two pianos. Although Paul Wittgenstein premiered Maurice Ravel's Concerto for the Left Hand, Février was expressly chosen by the composer to be the first French pianist to perform the work. When Wittgenstein's exclusive right to play the piece ended in 1937, Février performed it, first in Paris, then secondly in Boston with conductor Sergei Koussevitsky.

== Awards ==
He made many recordings of the French repertoire, receiving a Grand Prix du Disque of the Charles Cros Academy in 1963 for his recording of Ravel's piano works.

== Personal life ==
He also taught at the Conservatoire de Paris, where his students included Gabriel Tacchino, Alain Planès, and Valerie Tryon.

He died in Épinal in September 1979, a few weeks after being struck by a motorcyclist while walking in the countryside.
