= The Affair of the Poisons (play) =

1907 play written by Victorien Sardou

- Original language: French
- Written by: Victorien Sardou
- Genre: Historical
- Setting: Kingdom of France, 17th century

Premiere
- Date: 7 December 1907
- Place: Théâtre de la Porte Saint-Martin, Paris

The Affair of the Poisons (French: L'affaire des poisons) is a 1907 historical play by the dramatist Victorien Sardou. It portrays the events of the real-life Affair of the Poisons during the reign of Louis XIV and the downfall of his mistress Madame de Montespan. It was Sardou's final play.

== Film adaptation ==
In 1955 it was made into a French-Italian film of the same title directed by Henri Decoin and starring Danielle Darrieux, Viviane Romance and Paul Meurisse.

== Bibliography ==
- Goble, Alan. The Complete Index to Literary Sources in Film. Walter de Gruyter, 1999.
- Hart, Jerome Alfred. Sardou and the Sardou Plays. J.B. Lippincott, 1913.
- Schumacher, Claude, Northam, John & Wickham, Glynne W. Naturalism and Symbolism in European Theatre 1850-1918.Cambridge University Press, 1996.
