= Black Pearl =

Black Pearl or Black Pearls may refer to:

== Biology ==
- Ennerdale black pearl, a black pearl formed in freshwater mussels found on stretches of the Ehen and Irt rivers in Cumbria, UK
- Tahitian black pearl, a black pearl formed in the black lip oyster and primarily cultivated around Tahiti and surrounding islands

== Films ==
- Black Pearl (film), a 1934 Polish romantic crime drama
- Black Pearls (1919 film), a German silent film
- Black Pearls (1991 film), a martial arts film
- Black Pearl (Pirates of the Caribbean), a fictional ship in the Pirates of the Caribbean film series
- The Black Pearl, a 1928 American silent film starring Thomas A. Curran
- The Black Pearl, a 1977 American film based on the 1967 Scott O'Dell novel

== Literature ==
- The Black Pearl (comics), a 1996 series published by Dark Horse Comics
- The Black Pearl (novel), a 1967 young adult novel by Scott O'Dell
- The Black Pearl (play), an 1862 comedy in three acts
- The Black Pearl of the Borgias, a gem in the 1904 Sherlock Holmes story "The Adventure of the Six Napoleons"

== Music ==
- Black Pearl (American band), a San-Francisco-based band
- Black Pearl (South Korean group), a South Korean girl group
- "Black Pearl" (song), by Checkmates, Ltd., 1969
- "Black Pearl", a song on the 2013 Exo album XOXO
- Variatio 25. a 2 Clav. adagio, known as "the black pearl" of Bach's Goldberg Variations

=== Albums ===
- Black Pearl (Yo-Yo album), 1992
- Black Pearl (Jimmy McGriff album), 1971
- Black Pearl (Harrison/Blanchard album), 1988
- Black Pearls, 1964, by John Coltrane
- Black Pearl, 1982, by Pat Travers
- Black Pearl, 2022, by 50 Foot Wave

== People ==
- José Leandro Andrade (1901–1957), Uruguayan footballer
- Josephine Baker (1906–1975), American dancer, singer, and actress
- Larbi Benbarek (1914–1992), Moroccan-French footballer
- Black Pearl (wrestler) (born 1968), ring name of American professional wrestler Reno Anoaʻi
- Eusébio (1942–2014), Mozambican-born Portuguese footballer
- Harris Martin (1865–1903), African American boxer
- Paul McGrath (footballer) (born 1959), Irish footballer
- Pelé (1940–2022), Brazilian footballer
- Everage Richardson (born 1985), American basketball player
- Wilma Rudolph (1940–1994), American sprinter
- Roger Shah (born 1972), German electronic music composer and producer

== Other uses ==
- Black Pearl (yacht), a sailing yacht launched in 2016
- Black Pearl, New Orleans, a neighborhood in Louisiana, US
- Black Pearl, a community art installation at New Brighton, Merseyside, England
- Black Pearl, subname of Louis XIII (cognac)
- Black Pearl, a brigantine once owned by Barclay H. Warburton III, and the restaurant named after it

== See also ==
- "Black Perl", a code poem
