= Don't Tell the Wife (1927 film) =

1927 film by Paul L. Stein

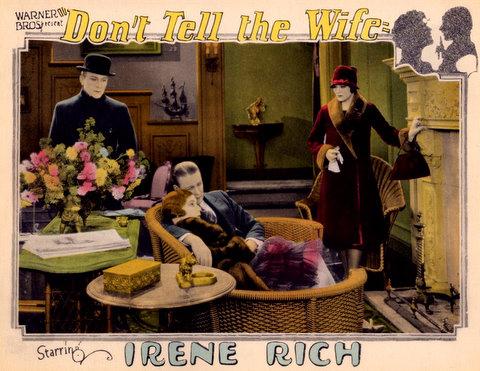
- Directed by: Paul L. Stein
- Screenplay by: Rex Taylor
- Based on: Divorçons; 1880 play by Victorien Sardou; Émile de Najac
- Starring: Irene Rich; Huntley Gordon; Lilyan Tashman
- Cinematography: David Abel
- Production company: Warner Bros.
- Distributed by: Warner Bros.
- Release date: January 22, 1927
- Running time: 70 minutes
- Country: United States
- Languages: Silent; English intertitles

Don't Tell the Wife is a 1927 American silent romantic comedy film directed by Paul L. Stein and starring Irene Rich, Huntley Gordon and Lilyan Tashman.

== Cast ==
- Irene Rich as Mrs. Cartier
- Huntley Gordon as Jacques Cartier
- Lilyan Tashman as Suzanna
- Otis Harlan as Magistrate
- William Demarest as Ray Valerian
- Margaret Gray as Frie

== See also ==
- List of early Warner Bros. sound and talking features

== Bibliography ==
- John T. Weaver. Twenty Years of Silents, 1908-1928. Scarecrow Press, 1971.
