= The Affair of the Poisons (film) =

1955 film directed by Henri Decoin

- Directed by: Henri Decoin
- Written by: Henri Decoin; Georges Neveux; Albert Valentin
- Based on: The Affair of the Poisons by Victorien Sardou
- Produced by: Henry Deutschmeister; Antonio Mosco; Nicola Naracci
- Starring: Danielle Darrieux; Viviane Romance; Paul Meurisse
- Cinematography: Borys Lewin
- Edited by: Claude Durand
- Music by: René Cloërec
- Production companies: Franco London Films; Excelsa Film
- Distributed by: Gaumont Distribution
- Release date: 4 November 1955
- Running time: 111 minutes
- Countries: France; Italy
- Language: French

The Affair of the Poisons (French: L'affaire des poisons, Italian: Il processo dei veleni) is a 1955 French-Italian historical drama film directed by Henri Decoin and starring Danielle Darrieux, Viviane Romance and Paul Meurisse. The film is adapted from the 1907 play of the same title by Victorien Sardou. It was shot in Technicolor at the Boulogne Studios in Paris. The film's sets were designed by the art director Jean d'Eaubonne. The film is set against the backdrop of the real Affair of the Poisons in seventeenth-century France, and demonstrates a darker tone than many more nostalgic depictions of the past.

== Synopsis ==
Worried that she is losing the interest of Louis XIV, his lover Madame de Montespan turns to a young witch who takes part in network of black magic and poisoning. The ensuing scandal rocks the French court and leads to arrests, executions and the banishment of de Montespan from public life.

== Cast ==
- Danielle Darrieux as Françoise Athénaïs de Montespan
- Viviane Romance as Catherine Deshayes dite La Voisin
- Paul Meurisse as L'abbé Etienne Guibourg
- Anne Vernon as Hermine Des Oeillets
- Pierre Mondy as Le capitaine François Desgrez
- François Patrice as Monsieur de Lignières
- Christine Carère as Marie-Angélique de Fontanges
- Roldano Lupi as L'alchimiste Lesage
- Albert Rémy as Le bourreau Guillaume
- Luisa Rossi as Madame Gobet
- Renaud Mary as Henri de Montespan
- Maurice Teynac as Nicolas de la Reynie
- Roland Armontel as L'aveugle
- Michel Etcheverry as Le prédicateur
- Albert Michel as Gobet
- Jacques Moulières as L'enfant de l'aveugle
- André Numès Fils as Le greffier
- Dominique Page as La fille enceinte
- Simone Paris as Madame de Ludre
- Jean-Marie Robain as Un juge de la Chambre Ardente

== Bibliography ==
- Oscherwitz, Danya. Past Forward: French Cinema and the Post-Colonial Heritage. SIU Press, 2010.
