= That Uncertain Feeling (film) =

1941 film by Ernst Lubitsch

- Theatrical poster
- Directed by: Ernst Lubitsch
- Screenplay by: Donald Ogden Stewart; Walter Reisch (adaptation)
- Based on: Divorçons; 1880 play by Victorien Sardou; Emile de Najac
- Produced by: Ernst Lubitsch; Sol Lesser (uncredited)
- Starring: Merle Oberon; Melvyn Douglas; Burgess Meredith
- Cinematography: George Barnes
- Edited by: William Shea
- Music by: Werner R. Heymann
- Production companies: Ernst Lubitsch Productions; Sol Lesser Productions
- Distributed by: United Artists
- Release date: April 20, 1941
- Running time: 84 minutes
- Country: United States
- Language: English
- Budget: $1 million (approx) or $750,000

That Uncertain Feeling is a 1941 American comedy film directed by Ernst Lubitsch and starring Merle Oberon, Melvyn Douglas and Burgess Meredith. The film is about the bored wife of an insurance salesman who meets an eccentric pianist and seeks a divorce. The screenplay by Walter Reisch and Donald Ogden Stewart was based on the 1880 French play Divorçons by Victorien Sardou and Émile de Najac.

== Plot ==
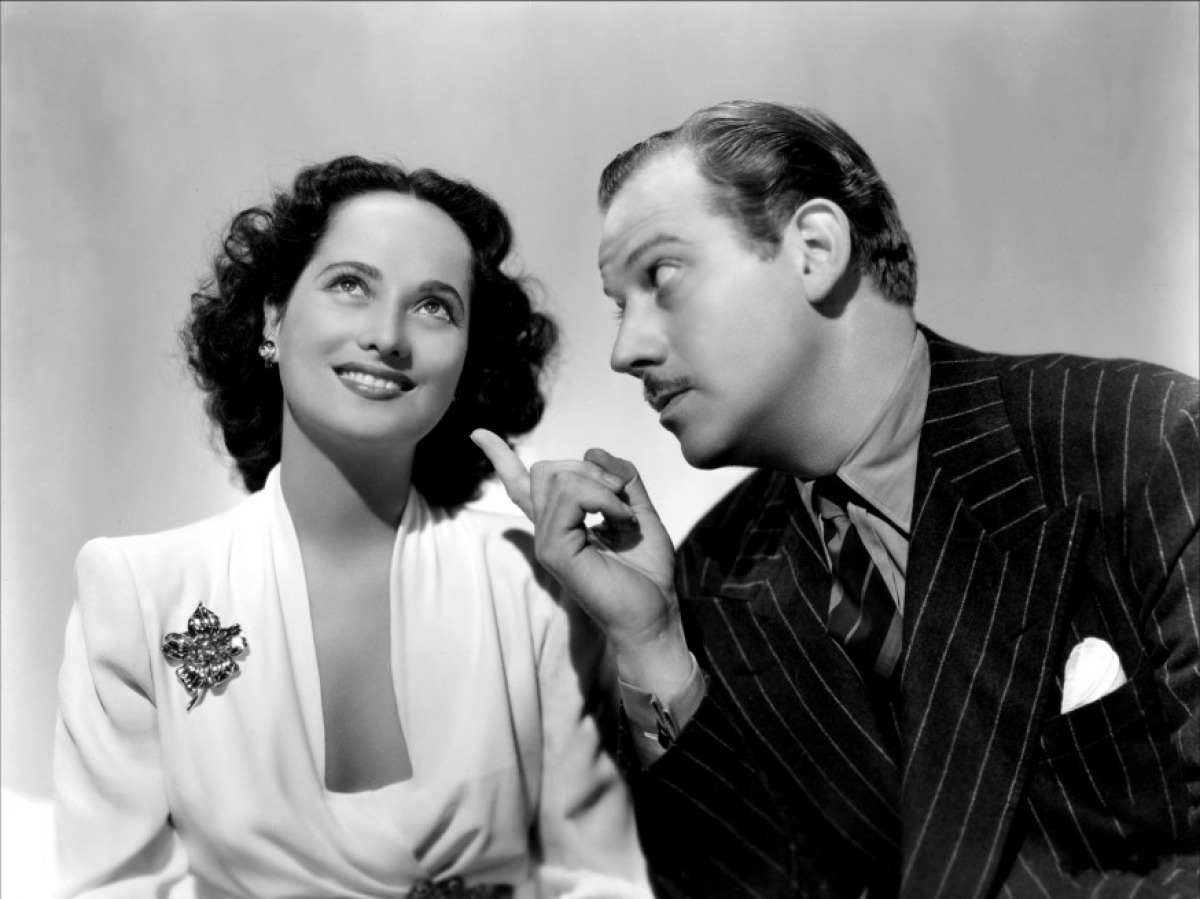
Merle Oberon and Melvyn Douglas in That Uncertain Feeling

That Uncertain Feeling

At the suggestion of one of her friends, Jill Baker visits psychoanalyst Dr. Vengard for her intermittent hiccups, which appear when she gets nervous or irritated. He soon has her questioning her previously happy marriage to her business executive husband Larry.

In Vengard's waiting room one day, Jill meets a very odd and individualistic pianist, Alexander Sebastian. He considers himself the best in the world when playing for a single listener, but has trouble performing in front of a large audience. She eventually invites him to an important dinner for Larry's prospective insurance buyers. When Larry realizes that Jill is infatuated with Sebastian, he gives her a friendly divorce, in which Larry is represented by a lawyer named Jones whose secretary is Sally Aikens.

Jill gets engaged to Sebastian, but after she learns that Larry is seeing an attractive woman, she realizes that she still loves her ex-husband. When she visits his apartment to reconcile with him, he goes into the next room and talks loudly, pretending Sally Aikens is in the room and that she is his girlfriend. His deception is revealed when Sally enters the apartment while he is in the next room breaking a dinner date with the distraught "Sally" (her supposed cries of anguish voiced by Larry). Jill and Larry get back together, and her hiccups vanish forever while a disgruntled Alexander gathers his belongings and leaves.

== Cast ==
- Merle Oberon as Jill Baker
- Melvyn Douglas as Larry Baker
- Burgess Meredith as Alexander Sebastian
- Alan Mowbray as Dr. Vengard
- Olive Blakeney as Margie Stallings, Jill's friend
- Harry Davenport as Jones, Larry's lawyer
- Sig Ruman as Mr. Kafka, Larry's prospective client
- Eve Arden as Sally Aikens
- Richard Carle as The Butler
- Rolfe Sedan as Art Dealer
- Jean Fenwick as Dr. Vengard's Nurse
- Gisela Werbezirk as Hungarian Dinner Guest

== Reception ==
The film was a failure at the box office.

== Award and honors ==
Werner R. Heymann was nominated for an Oscar for Best Music, Scoring of a Dramatic Picture.

== See also ==
- Let's Get a Divorce (1918)
- Kiss Me Again (1925)
