= Alain Planès =

French pianist

Alain Planès (Lyon, 20 January 1948) is a French classical pianist. He started playing the piano when he was 5 years, and began playing with an orchestra at 8 years old. He studied in Lyon, and then in Paris with Jacques Février, and was the soloist of the Ensemble intercontemporain of Pierre Boulez until 1981. His recording of Claude Debussy's Préludes was voted classical record of the year at the Victoires de la musique classique in 1986.
