= Benoît Georges de Najac =

French nobleman, fleet commissioner, reformer and freemason

Benoît Georges de Najac (22 November 1748 – 26 November 1823) was a French nobleman, fleet commissioner, reformer and freemason. He became an écuyer (1781), and a comte de l’Empire (L.P. of 26 April 1808), as comte de Najac.

His descendants included the librettist and man of letters, Émile de Najac.
