= Louis Payen =

French librettist

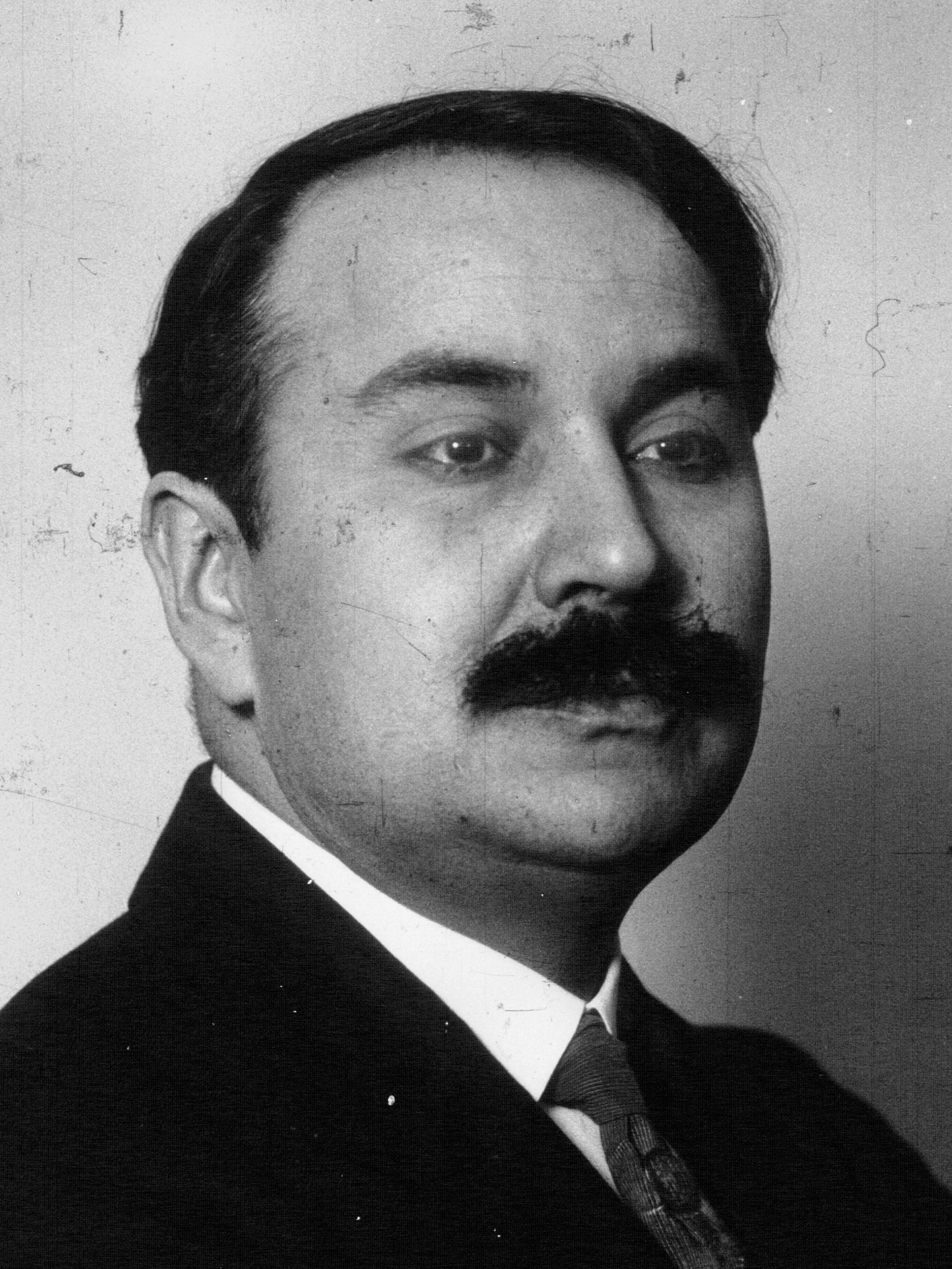
Louis Payen in 1913

Albert Liénard, known as Louis Payen (1875 – 1927) was a French librettist. He was secretary general of the Comédie-Française.

He wrote several librettos for Massenet, Kunc etc.

== Works ==
- 1908: La Victoire à Orange. Revival at the Arènes de Nîmes in 1911
- 1911: Les Esclaves, three-act tragedy, created at the Théâtre des Arènes in Béziers, 27–29 August 1911, music by Aymé Kunc,
- 1912: La monnaie de singe, four-act comedy (cowritten with Lucie Delarue-Mardrus
- Cléopâtre, four acts, music by Jules Massenet. Premiered posthumously in 1914.
- La Femme nue, drame lyrique in four acts, after the play by Henry Bataille, music by Henry Février
