= The Black Pearl (play) =

The Black Pearl (French: La Perle Noire) is a three-act comedy by the 19th-century French playwright Victorien Sardou that was first performed in 1862 in Paris. The play is based upon a story written by Sardou and first published in December 1861 under the title The Medallion.

== Synopsis ==
In 1825, in Amsterdam, Messieurs Balthazar and Cornelius sit down to supper during a particularly strong thunderstorm. Balthazar informs Cornelius that he is aware that Cornelius is in love with Christiane, who had been raised by Balthazar's mother, and is practically his sister. He gives his blessing to a marriage between Cornelius and Christiane.

Sara Vanderven arrives, and Cornelius informs her that Balthazar has been in love with her for years, but is too intimidated to let her know. Sara agrees to marry Balthazar, if he will bring to her home a certain locket, which contains a flower that had meant something to them when they were children. However, when Bathazar goes to his study to retrieve the locket, he is shocked to find that the room had been burgled, and all of his valuables taken, including the locket.

Help soon arrives in the form of Burgomaster Tricamp, a rather Sherlockian detective who quickly determines that the crime was perpetrated by a small woman, who is not an experienced thief and knows the house intimately. He is convinced that the crime could have been committed by none other than Christiane, and he soon wins Bathazar over to his way of thinking. However, even though he is a scientist, Cornelius refuses to doubt his beloved Christiane.

Reexamining the physical evidence of the crime, Cornelius declares that he knows who the criminal is, and that it is not Christiane but in fact a bolt of lightning. It seems that lightning shot down the chimney into the room, magnetically gathered the metallic valuables, carried them along a bell-wire into the bell, and finally shot out through a window, leaving a small hole in the glass.

Monsieur Tricamp declares Christiane exonerated, and Christiane agrees to marry Cornelius.
