= Jules Février =

French architect

Jules Février (French pronunciation: [ʒyl fevʁije]; 1842 in Membrey – 23 January 1937 in Paris) was a French architect. His notable works included the Gran Vía in Madrid, on which he collaborated with his son Raymond, also an architect. Another son, Henry Février, was a composer.
