= Cléopâtre =

Opera by Jules Massenet

- Opera by Jules Massenet
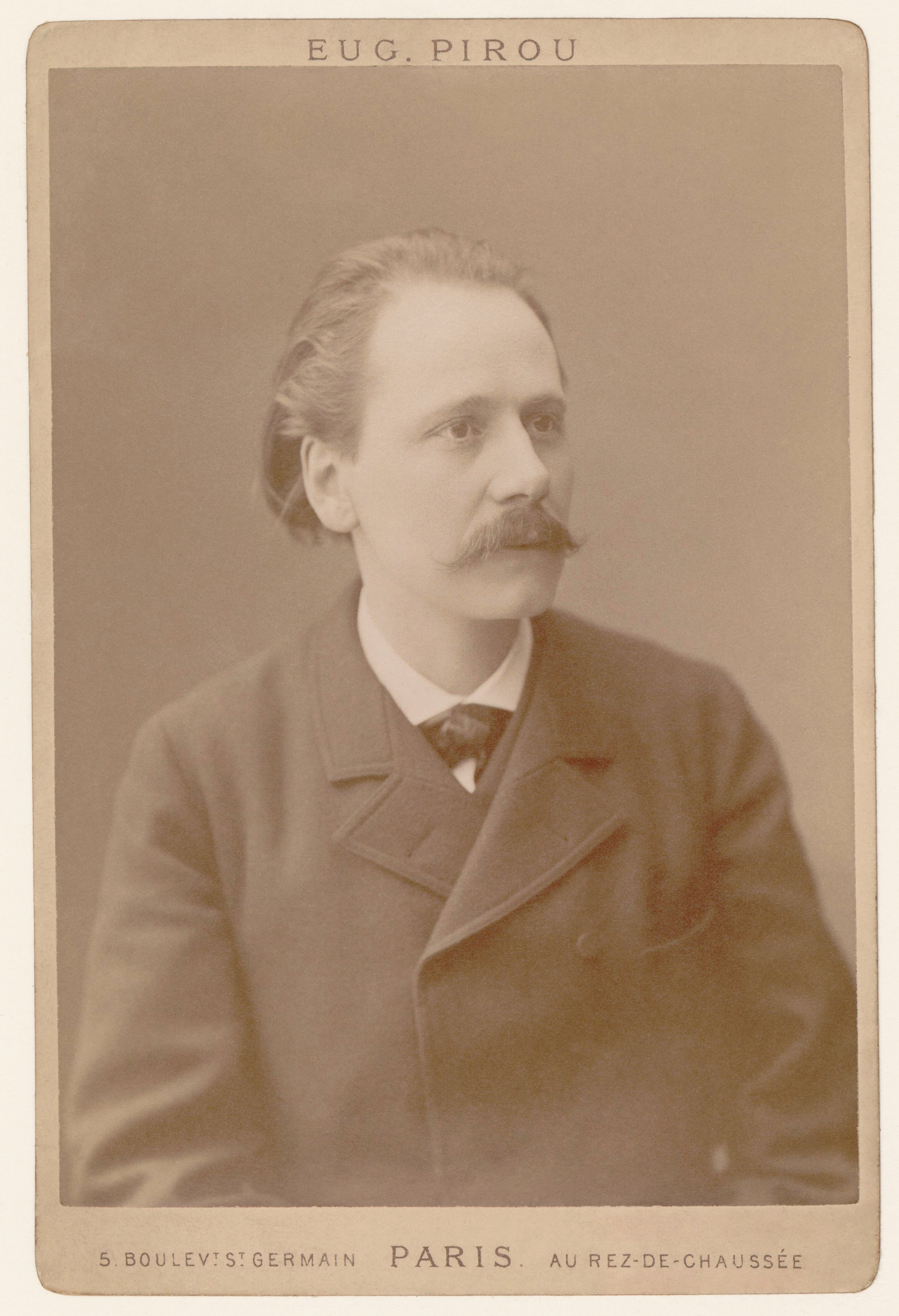
- The composer, Jules Massenet, photographed by Eugène Pirou, 1895
- Librettist: Louis Payen
- Language: French
- Premiere: 23 February 1914; Opéra de Monte Carlo

Cléopâtre is an opera in four acts by Jules Massenet to a French libretto by Louis Payen. It was first performed at the Opéra de Monte-Carlo on 23 February 1914, nearly two years after Massenet's death.

Cléopâtre is one of three operas by Massenet to be premiered posthumously; the others are Panurge (1913) and Amadis (1922). The piece has seen limited revival since its premiere and has a modest modern recording history.

== Performance history ==
Though the opera was written for the mezzo Lucy Arbell, the role of Cléopâtre was created by the soprano Maria Nikolaevna Kuznetsova. The Chicago Opera Association presented the first American performance on 10 January 1916 with Kuznetsova. The first New York performance was on 23 January 1919 with Mary Garden. It was revived at the Massenet Festival in Saint-Étienne in 1990 conducted by Patrick Fournillier with Kathryn Harries in the title role. This production yielded a live recording (on two CDs) issued by Koch Schwann.

New York saw a revival of Cléopâtre on June 26, 1997 by Opera Manhattan at Alice Tully Hall with Marion Capriotti in the title role (having filled in for Florence Quivar at the last minute), conducted by Gabriel Guimarães. In 2004, a concert version was performed at the Liceu in Barcelona with Montserrat Caballé. A concert performance conducted by Vladimir Fedoseyev as part of the Salzburg Whitsun Festival 2012 featured Sophie Koch in the title role, Ludovic Tézier as Marc-Antoine and Véronique Gens as Octavie.

Rodney Milnes described the opera as "enjoyable, emotionally vigorous Massenet in his grand opera manner", and noted that "by this stage of his career (1912) the composer wasted little time with grand opera trappings - he gets through the plot (including obligatory ballet) in under two hours", while pointing out "the simplicity, the superb word-setting impress the most, as well as the clarity with which he delineates the opposing sound-worlds - sinuous chromaticism for Egypt, near-Elgarian noblesse for Rome".

== Roles ==
| Role | Voice type | Premiere Cast, 23 February 1914 (Conductor: Léon Jehin) |
|---|---|---|
| Cléopâtre | mezzo-soprano | Maria Nikolaevna Kuznetsova |
| Marc-Antoine | baritone | Alfred Maguénat |
| Octavie | soprano | Lilian Grenville |
| Spakos | tenor | Charles Rousselière |
| Amnhès | baritone | Pierre Clauzure |
| Charmion | soprano | Carton |
| Ennius | baritone | Feiner |
| Sévérus | baritone | Ghastau |
| L'Esclave de la Porte | baritone | Gasparini |
| Adamos | male dancer | Magliani |
| A voice | baritone | Lozé |
| Octave | mute | |
Chorus: Roman chiefs and soldiers, Greek and Egyptian slaves, nuptial train, crowd in the tavern, Cléopâtre's followers; Dancers – slaves, Lydiennes, Chaldiennes, Phyrigieens, Amazons, Scythians, tavern jugglers.

== Synopsis ==
The story concerns the ill-fated love of Cléopâtre and Marc-Antoine. Marc-Antoine sees Cléopâtre for the first time following the conquering of Egypt and is instantly entranced by her beauty. Dismissing his obligations in Rome, Marc-Antoine goes with Cléopâtre, and even after returning to fulfill his promise of marriage to Octavia, he is lured back by lust and jealousy. Being told, falsely, that Cléopâtre has been killed, Marc-Antoine falls on his own sword and is then brought to Cléopâtre. As she watches him die by her side, she pulls a poisonous snake from a basket of fruit and clutches it to her breast.

=== Noted arias ===
- Act 3 – Cléopâtre: "J'ai versé le poison dans cette coupe d'or"
