= Eugène Ortolan =

French jurist, diplomat and composer

Eugène Ortolan (1 April 1824 – 11 May 1891) was a 19th-century French jurist, diplomat and composer.

== Biography ==
Born in Paris, Eugene Ortolan came from a family of lawyers. His grandfather was a magistrate in Toulon, his father Joseph Louis Elzéar Ortolan, a prosecutor and professor at the Paris Law Faculty. His uncle Jean-Félicité-Théodore Ortolan was an expert in maritime law.

By family tradition, Eugène Ortolan began a legal career, although his tastes leaned especially towards music. He led both his studies in law in Paris, where he obtained his doctorate and studied music at the Conservatoire de Paris. A student of Jacques Fromental Halévy for counterpoint, and Berton for composition, he presented in 1845 the competition of musical composition of the Institut de France and won first Second Grand Prix de Rome, the only prize awarded that year. The chosen poem was Imogine by Pierre-Ange Vieillard (scene with three voices).

In 1849, after his doctorate in international law, he was employed at the Foreign Ministry. He made many trips abroad in the diplomatic service, primarily in Belgium and Russia. He ended his career as consul-general in Australia. He returned to France in 1881, retired in 1884 and died in Paris aged 67.

== Works ==
=== Music ===
Due to his diplomatic career, Eugène Ortolan did not compose much.

- some mélodies, described by François-Joseph Fétis as having "A nice tour and a happy character"
- symphonic pieces
- an oratorio, Tobie, written on a poem by Léon Halévy (Versailles, 16 April 1867)
- the two-act opéra comique Lisette (Théâtre-Lyrique du boulevard du Temple, 10 April 1855)
- the one-act operetta La Momie de Roscoco (Théâtre des Bouffes-Parisiens, 27 July 1857)

=== Law ===
- Des moyens d'acquérir le domaine international ou propriété d'état entre les nations, d'après le droit des gens public, comparés aux moyens d'acquérir la propriété entre particuliers, d'après le droit privé, et suivis de l'examen des principes de l'équilibre politique (Paris: Amyot, 1851).
