= Émile de Najac =

Playwright and opera librettist

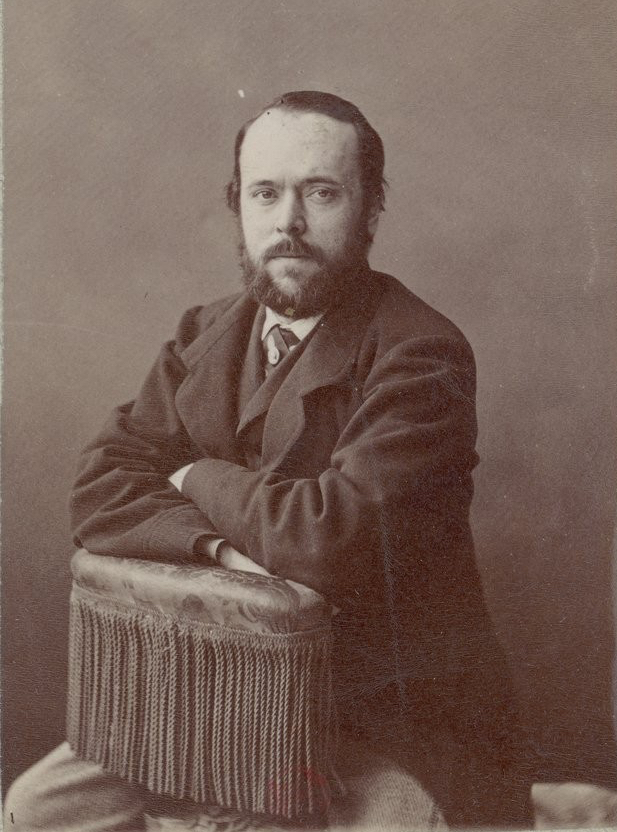

Comte Émile de Najac (December 1828 – 11 April 1889) was a French librettist. He was a prolific writer during the Second Empire and early part of the Third Republic, supplying plays and opéra comique librettos, many in one act.

== Biography ==
Émile de Najac was born in Lorient, France, the descendant of naval commander and bonapartist Benoît Georges de Najac. His son Raoul Charles Eugène was also a writer for the stage. Najac died in Paris on 11 April 1889.

== Works ==
Always writing with a co-author, Najac provided librettos for several opéras comiques and opéras bouffes: La Momie de Roscoco, with Eugène Ortolan, music by Émile Jonas, (Bouffes-Parisiens, 1857); Les Noces de Fernande, with Victorien Sardou, music by Louis Deffès, (Opéra-Comique, 1878); La Bonne Aventure, with Henri Bocage, music by Émile Jonas, (Théâtre de la Renaissance, 1882); Le Premier baiser, with Raoul Toché, music by Jonas (Nouveautés 1883). La vie mondaine and Paul Ferrier, music by Charles Lecocq (Théâtre des Nouveautés, 1885); and Le roi malgré lui, with Paul Burani, music by Emmanuel Chabrier (Opéra-Comique, 1887). In Grove's Dictionary of Music and Musicians, Christopher Smith says of Najac, "[He] formed no lasting association with any one librettist or composer, which may explain why he made comparatively little of his talents despite his industriousness".

For the non-musical theatre, Najac was known for his comedies. For the Théâtre du Gymnase he collaborated with Alfred Hennequin on Bébé (1877) and Petite Correspondance (1878), both comédies in three acts, followed by Nounou (comédie, five acts, 1879). He wrote, or co-wrote four plays for the Théâtre du Palais-Royal: Les Provinciales à Paris (comédie, four acts, with Pol Moreau, 1878); Divorçons (comédie, three acts, with Sardou, 1880); Elle et lui (comédie, three acts, 1885); Bijou et Bouvreuil (vaudeville, three acts, with Albert Millaud) and On le dit (comédie, three acts, with Charles Raymond, 1888).

For the Théâtre des Variétés Najac wrote Le Chant du coq (comédie, one act, 1879, and collaborared with Millaud on Le Fiacre 117 (comédie, three acts,1886); La Noce à Nini (vaudeville, three acts, 1887); and La Japonaise, (comédie-vaudeville, four acts, 1888). For the Théâtre de la Renaissance the two co-wrote L'Hypnotisé (comédie, three acts, 1888).

Divorçons remains in the French theatrical repertoire, and was the basis for two films by Ernst Lubitsch: Kiss Me Again (1925) and That Uncertain Feeling.

== References and sources ==
=== Sources ===
- Adam, Thomas (2005). Germany and the Americas: Culture, Politics and History. Santa Barbara: ABC-CLIO. ISBN 978-1-85109-628-2.
