= Henry Février =

French composer (1875–1957)

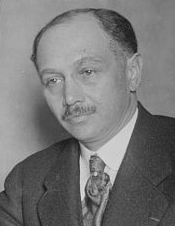
Henry Février

Henry Février (French pronunciation: [ɑ̃ʁi fevʁije]; 2 October 1875 – 6 July 1957) was a French composer.

== Biography ==
Henry Février was born in Paris, France, on 2 October 1875, the son of architect Jules Février. He studied at the Paris Conservatoire, where his teachers included Jules Massenet and Gabriel Fauré. He also took private lessons with André Messager.

His first compositions were chamber music, but he is chiefly known for his operas and operettas, among which are Le Roi aveugle (1906), Monna Vanna (1909), Carmosine (1913), Gismonda (Chicago 1919), La Damnation de Blanchefleur (1920), L'Ile désenchantée (1925), Oletta (1927), La Femme nue (1929) and Sylvette (1932). His works also include incidental music for plays, including Agnès, dame galante (1912) and Aphrodite (1914). Février ceased composing music in the 1940s. He died on 6 July 1957.

He is father of the pianist Jacques Février.
