= Maximilian von Jaunez =

French-German industrialist and politician

General Councilor of Volmunster
- In office 1900–1917

Member of the Reichstag
- In office 1903–1907
- Monarch: Wilhelm II

Personal details
- Born: Maximilian Jaunez; 9 March 1873 Sarreguemines, Bezirk Lothringen, German Empire
- Died: 9 May 1947 (aged 74) Sarreguemines, France
- Spouse(s): Jeanne de Montagnac (1903–1911; div.); Florrie King (m. 1927)
- Children: 2 (including Nelly de Vogüé)
- Parents: Édouard von Jaunez (father); Berthe de Geiger (mother)
- Education: University of Strasbourg; University of Jena
- Occupation: politician, engineer, businessman

Maximilian von Jaunez (9 March 1873 – 9 May 1947), commonly known as Max Jaunez, was a French-German industrialist and politician. From 1903 to 1907, he served in the Reichstag of the German Empire and from 1900 to 1917, he served as the General Councilor of Volmunster. Jaunez owned and operated the Utzschneider & Ed. Jaunez ceramics factory in Sarreguemines and was the owner of the Chateau de Rémelfing.

== Early life ==
Maximilian Jaunez was born on 9 March 1873 in Sarreguemines, Bezirk Lothringen to Édouard (von) Jaunez, an industrialist and politician, and Berthe de Geiger. He came from a prominent business family in Moselle, a French department that was under German rule. His father was ennobled by Wilhelm II in 1904 as a hereditary knight, which granted Jaunez and other members of the Jaunez family to have the privilege to use the nobiliary particle "von" in their surname and elevated them into the Prussian nobility.

He studied at the University of Strasbourg and, in 1896, obtained a doctorate in law from the University of Jena.

== Political and industrial career ==
Jaunez owned and operated the Utzschneider & Ed. Jaunez ceramics factory in Sarreguemines, which was co-founded by his father and his grand uncles, Charles Joseph and Maximilian Utzschneider, in 1864.

In 1900, Jaunez was elected as General Councilor of Volmunster, and remained in this post until 1917. He was elected to the Reichstag of the German Empire in June 1903 as a representative of Metz-Campagne and served as a member of parliament until January 1907.

== Personal life ==
In 1903, Jaunez married the French aristocratic singer Jeanne de Montagnac in Paris. They had two children, Bertrand and Hélène "Nelly", the latter became the mistress of Antoine de Saint-Exupéry. The family lived in the Chateau de Rémelfing and at an apartment at 82 Boulevard de Courcelles in Paris. In 1911, Jaunez and his wife divorced. Jaunez married secondly, in 1927, Florrie King, who was the daughter of a coal miner from Hunslet, Yorkshire. Jaunez was Catholic. In 1917, during the start of the First World War, Jaunez emigrated to Switzerland and was stripped of his German citizenship. He died in Sarreguemines, France on 9 May 1947.
