= Nelly de Vogüé =

French writer and aristocrat

Madame Nelly de Vogüé
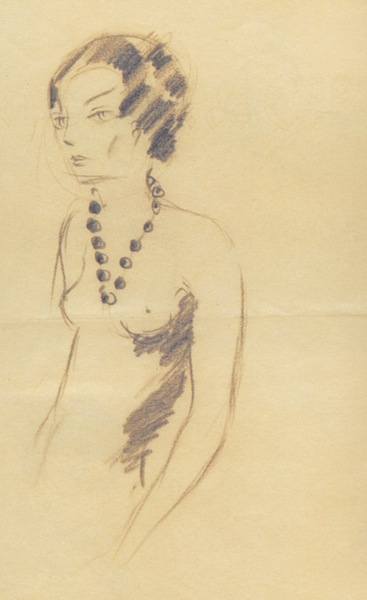
- Drawing of Madame de Vogüé by Saint-Exupéry
- Born: Hélène Marie Henriette von Jaunez; 28 November 1908; Paris, France
- Died: 17 June 2003 (aged 94); Paris, France
- Education: École des Beaux-Arts de Paris
- Occupations: writer, painter, socialite, businesswoman
- Spouse: Count Jean de Vogüé
- Partner: Count Antoine de Saint-Exupéry
- Children: 1
- Parent(s): Maximilian von Jaunez (father); Jeanne de Montagnac (mother)
- Relatives: Édouard von Jaunez (grandfather)
- Writing career
- Pen name: Pierre Chevrier
- Genre: biography

Countess Hélène "Nelly" Marie Henriette de Vogüé (French pronunciation: [elɛn maʁi ɑ̃ʁjɛt də vɔɡɥe]; née von Jaunez; 28 November 1908 – 17 June 2003) was a French aristocrat, socialite, businesswoman, painter, and writer. She studied art at the École des Beaux-Arts de Paris before succeeding her father as president of Haviland France, her family's ceramics company.

During World War II, de Vogüé was surveilled by the Allied Intelligence Bureau after her ability to move freely, using various aliases, between Allied and Axis territories raised suspicions. The Office of Strategic Services filed over seventeen pages in reports detailing their suspicion that de Vogüé may have been an agent of Vichy France and a Nazi collaborator.

She was the long-time mistress of Antoine de Saint-Exupéry, and was referred to as Madame de B. in his biographies and as The Beautiful E in the memoirs of Consuelo de Saint-Exupéry. Following de Saint-Exupéry's presumed death in 1944, de Vogüé became the executrix of his literary works and, under the nom de plume Pierre Chevrier, authored his biography in 1949. She published the posthumous editions of de Saint-Exupéry's manuscripts for Écrits de guerre, Citadelle, and Carnets. She submitted her collection of de Saint-Exupéry's writings to the Archives Nationales, where they will be privately held until 2053.

== Biography ==
De Vogüé was born on 28 November 1908 to Maximilian von Jaunez, a prominent French-German industrialist who was part of the Prussian nobility and owned a large ceramics factory in Eastern France, and Jeanne de Montagnac, a singer and a daughter of Louis Elizé de Montagnac, Baron de Montagnac. She was of German ancestry on her father's side. Her paternal grandfather, Édouard von Jaunez, was a member of the Imperial German Reichstag and the president of the Regional Council of Lorraine. Through her maternal grandmother, Henriette Delphine Rosalés y de Beusse, she was a descendant of the Basque-Chilean Larraín family. De Vogüé's parents divorced in 1911. Her mother married a second time, in 1925, to Count Charles M César Ludovic de Polignac and her father married a second time, in 1927, to Florrie King.

She was considered a "ravishing beauty" and was renowned in Parisian society for her beauty and her intellect. De Vogüé was a passionate painter and studied art at the École des Beaux-Arts de Paris. She was well-versed in literature and was fluent in several languages. She inherited her father's ceramics factory, Haviland France, and took over as the company's president, becoming one of the first women business leaders in France.

In 1927, she married the French aristocrat Count Jean Alexandre Melchior de Vogüé, a grandson of Melchior de Vogüé. They had one son, Patrice de Vogüé.

De Vogüé died on 17 June 2003 in the 7th arrondissement of Paris.

== Relationship with Saint-Exupéry ==
De Vogüé was introduced to Count Antoine de Saint-Exupéry in 1929 at the home of their friend, Louise Lévêque de Vilmorin. They met again afterwards attending Parisian salons. By 1934, she was one of the lovers of de Saint-Exupéry, who was married to Consuelo Suncín de Sandoval. Consuelo knew of the affair, which caused her much distress, and referred to de Vogüé as the beautiful E in her memoirs. She remained his mistress until his death. She accompanied him on his travels, and was photographed with him returning from a trip to Moscow in 1938.

In 1943, she joined de Saint-Exupéry in Algiers, arriving from Gibraltar in an American plane that was being watched by the Allied Intelligence Bureau due to there being a rising suspicion in her ability to move freely between Allied and Axis territory. The Office of Strategic Services made over seventeen pages of reports detailing their suspicion that de Vogüé was an agent of Vichy France and a Nazi collaborator during the Second World War. Throughout the war, she was able to move between Nazi-occupied France and allied territories including London and New York using a variety of aliases. The Office of Strategic Services identified Saint-Exupéry as her lover, stating in one report that "Although a French patriot, subject has been equivocal in his attitude towards France."

After she left Algiers, de Saint-Exupéry wrote her several letters mentioning his regrets for their arguments and his love and need for her. De Saint-Exupéry's last letter to de Vogüé was written on 30 July 1944. Upon de Saint-Exupéry's disappearance and presumed death in 1944, de Vogüé inherited his literary estate. She promoted his work and sought to celebritize his literary reputation, helping writers with source materials and granting biographers permission to access and write about his work. De Vogüé required the writers who she granted access to never disclose her relationship with Saint-Exupéry. As such, biographers she worked with referred to her as Madame d B. to conceal her identity. She deposited her collection of her lover's writings in the Archives Nationales, where they will be kept privately until 2053.

In 1949, she published a book dedicated to de Saint-Exupéry, writing under the pseudonym Pierre Chevrier. She also published the posthumous editions of de Saint-Exupéry's manuscripts for Écrits de guerre, Citadelle, and Carnets.
