= Jeanne de Montagnac =

French singer and salonnière

Madame Jeanne de Montagnac
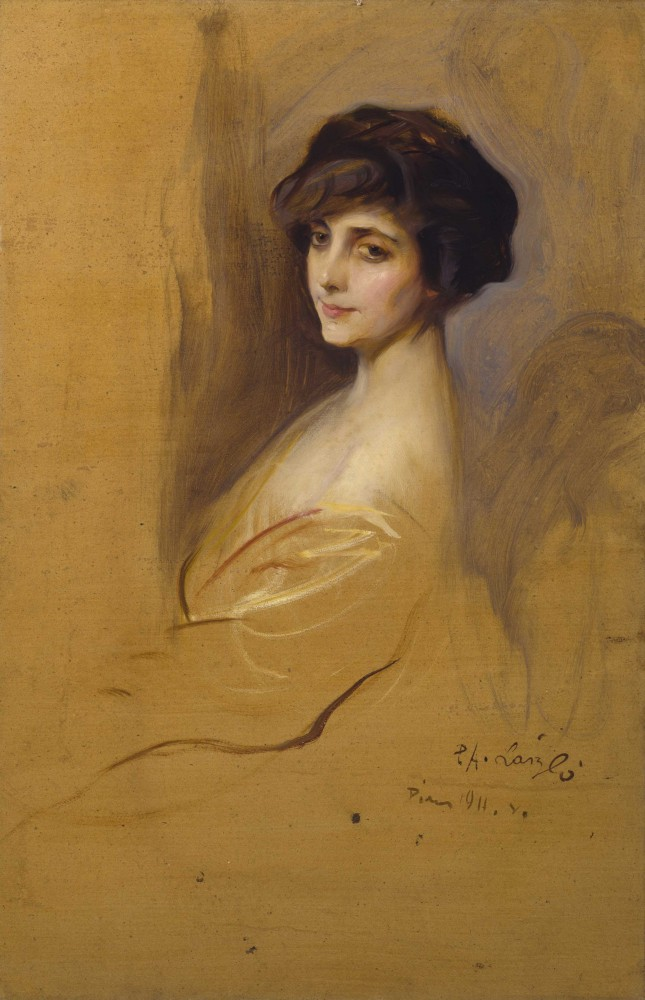
- Portrait by Philip de László, 1911
- Born: Clémence Elise Marie Jeanne de Montagnac; 16 April 1882; Paris, France
- Died: 27 June 1966 (aged 84); Paris, France
- Occupations: socialite, salonnière, arts patron, singer
- Title: Comtesse Charles de Polignac
- Spouses: Maximilian von Jaunez (1903–1911; div.); Count Charles de Polignac (m. 1925)
- Children: 2 (including Nelly de Vogüé)
- Parent(s): Louis Elizé de Montagnac, 2nd Baron de Montagnac; Henriette Delphine Rosalés y de Beusse
- Family: Montagnac (by birth); Polignac (by marriage)

Clémence Elise Marie Jeanne "Pata" de Montagnac (16 April 1882 – 27 June 1966), later known as Madame Maximilian von Jaunez and Comtesse Charles de Polignac, was a French socialite, salonnière, arts patron, and singer. She co-hosted salons at the Avenue Henri-Martin hôtel particulier of her aunt by marriage, Princess Edmond de Polignac, and performed with Richard Strauss and at the celebrated salons of Marguerite de Saint Marceaux. She ceased performing in 1925, but remained active in musical circles. She was a close friend of the composers Francis Poulenc and Gabriel Fauré. De Montagnac was the subject of a portrait and two etchings by Paul César Helleu and of three portraits by Philip de László. De László's second portrait of her, completed in 1911, was purchased by the Glasgow Corporation while on exhibit in Glasgow in 1913, making it the artist's first work to be acquired by a public collection in the United Kingdom.

== Early life and family ==
Jeanne de Montagnac, who was affectionately known as "Pata", was born on 16 April 1882 in Paris to Louis Elisée de Montagnac, 2nd Baron de Montagnac and Henriette Delphine Rosalés y de Beusse, a descendant of the Larraín family. She had two older sisters, Yvonne and Henriette. She grew up in a well-connected musical family. Gabriel Fauré, a friend of her mother's, dedicated his Sérénade Toscane (op. 3, no. 2) to de Montagnac. When she was four years old, Paul César Helleu painted a portrait and made two etchings of her.

== Adult life ==
=== First marriage ===
On 30 May 1903, de Montagnac married the industrialist Maximilian Jaunez in Paris. He was the director of the ceramics factory Utzschneider & Ed. Jaunez in Sarreguemines, which was founded by his father, Édouard Jaunez, and his grand uncles Charles Joseph and Maximilian Utzschneider in 1864. Her father-in-law, Édouard, was also a politician who was elected as mayor of Sarreguemines, served as president of the Alsace-Lorraine Landesausschuss, and represented Lorraine in the Reichstag. The Jaunez family was elevated to the Prussian nobility in 1904, granting them the right to use the nobiliary particle von in their surname. De Montagnac and Jaunez had two children, Bertrand (born 1904) and Hélène "Nelly" (born 1908). She and Jaunez divorced in 1911.

De Montagnac purchased the Chateau de Les Clayes-sous-Bois in 1920 and began restoring it. She sold the chateau to Lucy and Jos Hessel after marrying her second husband.

=== Second marriage ===
On 27 April 1925, de Montagnac married Count Charles de Polignac, the son of Guy, Marquis de Polignac and Jeanne Pommery and the nephew of the composer Prince Edmond de Polignac. Her husband was the president of the Champagne house Pommery & Greno. Upon her second marriage, she became associated with one of the most illustrious French families of musical patrons.

== Music, art, and salons ==
De Montagnac was the subject of multiple portraits by the Anglo-Hungarian painter Philip de László, who she was likely introduced to by Armand de Gramont, 12th Duc de Gramont. She was painted on three separate occasions by him, and he kept multiple study portraits of her in his private collection. The first painting, Madame Maximilian von Jaunez was completed in 1909. A second portrait, completed in 1911, was exhibited in Glasgow in 1913, where it was purchased by the Glasgow Corporation for £157.10, becoming de László's first work to be acquired by a public collection in the United Kingdom. His third of de Montagnax was completed in 1914.

De Montagnac's aunt by marriage, Winnaretta, Princess Edmond de Polignac, held famous salons at her hôtel particulier on Avenue Henri-Martin, which de Montagnac seconded as a hostess. She was instrumental in Princess Edmond's commissioning of Francis Poulenc's Concerto for Two Pianos and Orchestra in D Minor. As a close friend of Poulenc, she received numerous signed copies of his music as gifts.

De Montagnac was a musician herself, and performed as a dilettante singer with Richard Strauss and at the salons of Marguerite de Saint Marceaux, which were frequented by Giovanni Boldini, Maurice Ravel, Gabriel Fauré, Jacques-Émile Blanche, and Colette. In 1925, she suffered a vocal cord injury and stopped performing, but remained involved in musical circles.

She died in Paris on 27 June 1966.
