= Gérard Longuet =

French politician (born 1946)

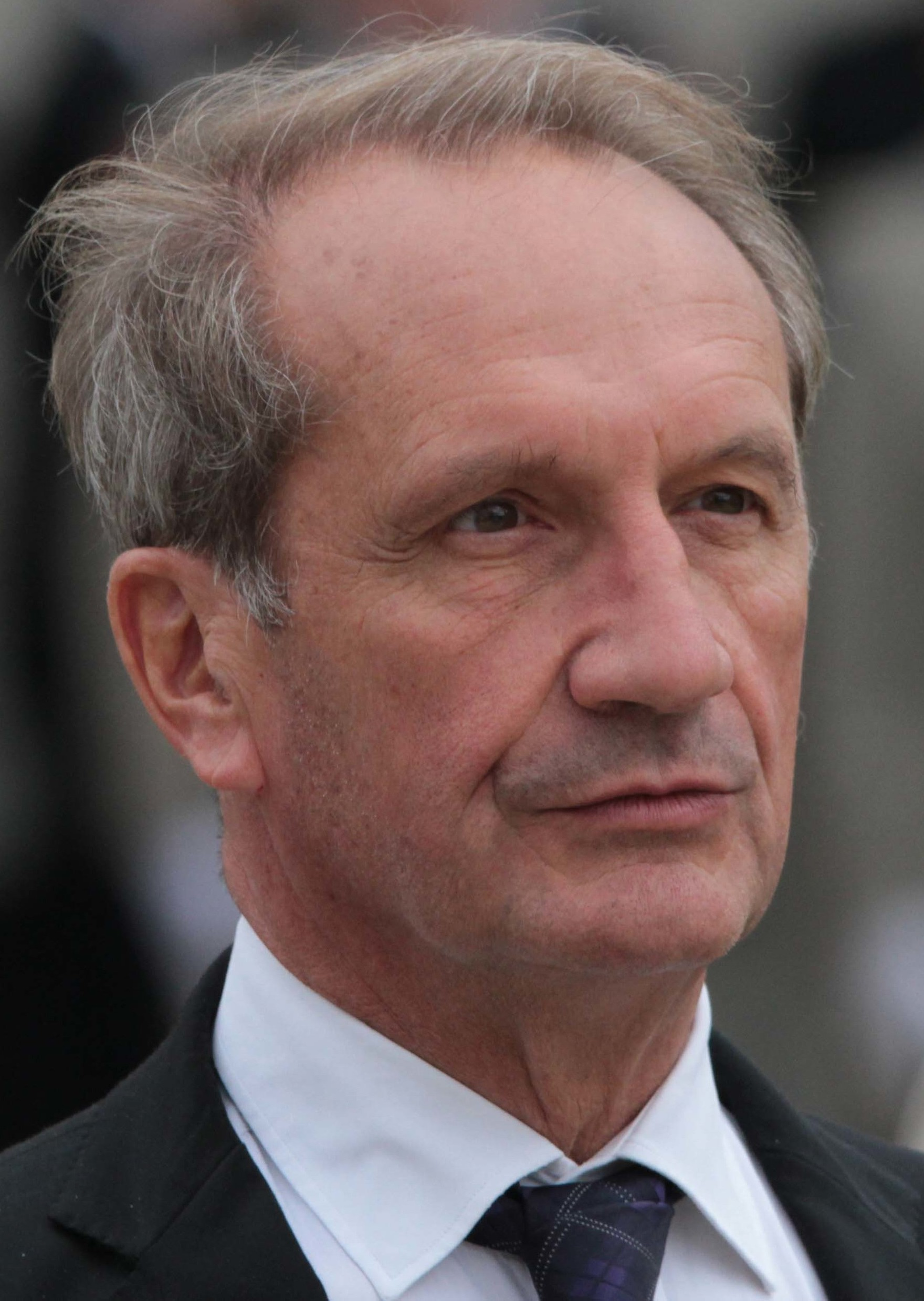
- Longuet in 2011

Minister of Defence and Veterans Affairs
- In office 27 February 2011 – 15 May 2012
- Prime Minister: François Fillon
- Preceded by: Alain Juppé
- Succeeded by: Jean-Yves Le Drian

Minister of Industry, Posts and Telecommunications and External Trade
- In office 30 March 1993 – 14 October 1994
- Prime Minister: Édouard Balladur
- Preceded by: Dominique Strauss-Kahn
- Succeeded by: José Rossi

President of the Union for a Popular Movement group in the Senate
- In office 7 July 2009 – 7 March 2011
- Preceded by: Henri de Raincourt
- Succeeded by: Jean-Claude Gaudin

Senator for Meuse
- In office 17 June 2012 – 2 October 2023
- In office 1 October 2001 – 27 March 2011

Member of the European Parliament for France
- In office 24 July 1984 – 19 March 1986

President of the Regional Council of Lorraine
- In office 4 April 1992 – 2 April 2004
- Preceded by: Jean-Marie Rausch
- Succeeded by: Jean-Pierre Masseret

Personal details
- Born: Gérard Edmond Jacques Longuet; 24 February 1946 (age 80) Neuilly-sur-Seine, France
- Party: Republican Party (before 1997); Liberal Democracy (1997–1998); Independent Republican and Liberal Pole (1998); Union for French Democracy (1998–2002); Union for a Popular Movement (2002–2015); The Republicans (2015–present)
- Education: Lycée Henri-IV
- Alma mater: Panthéon-Assas University; Sciences Po; École nationale d'administration

Gérard Edmond Jacques Longuet (French pronunciation: [ʒeʁaʁ lɔ̃ɡɛ]; born 24 February 1946) is a French politician who served as Minister of Defence and Veterans Affairs in the government of Prime Minister François Fillon from 2011 to 2012. A member of The Republicans (LR), he represented the Meuse department in the Senate from 2001 to 2011 and again from 2012 to 2023.

== Political career ==
=== Early beginnings ===
When he was young, Longuet was part of a far-right movement called Occident. In 1968, he wrote the founding charter of the Groupe Union Défense (GUD), a far-right students' union.

=== Career in national politics ===
Longuet served as a member of the National Assembly for the 1st constituency for Meuse from 1978 to 1981 and again from 1988 to 1993.

In the government of Prime Minister Jacques Chirac, Longuet first was Secretary of State for Posts and Telecommunications (March–August 1986) before becoming Minister of Posts and Telecommunications (1986–1988).

From 1990 to 1995, Longuet served as president of the Republican Party (PR). During that time, he was also Minister of Industry, Posts and Telecommunications, and Foreign Trade in the government of Prime Minister Édouard Balladur from 1993 until he resigned in 1994. Ahead of the 1995 presidential campaign, he supported Balladur as center-right candidate; instead, Jacques Chirac won the party's nomination and later the election.

On the regional level, Longuet was a regional councillor of Lorraine from 1992 until his resignation in 2010. He served as president of the Regional Council of Lorraine from 1992 to 2004.

From 2009 to 2011, Longuet served as the leader of the Union for a Popular Movement (UMP) in the Senate.

=== Minister of Defence, 2011–2012 ===
Shortly after taking office as Defence Minister under Prime Minister François Fillon, Longuet oversaw the French Air Force's involvement in the 2011 military intervention in Libya. After the mission ended, he met his Libyan counterpart Osama al-Juwaili in 2012 to sign a letter of intent to improve maritime security and control Libya’s borders.

Also early in his tenure, it was revealed that Longuet had spent a weekend in 2006 in a Tunisian palace at the expense of President Zine El Abidine Ben Ali, who was overthrown shortly after by a popular revolt.

In January 2012, President Sarkozy dispatched Longuet and the head of the French army to Afghanistan to conduct a review of security after an Afghan soldier killed four French service members. Shortly after, Longuet announced that France would withdraw its combat forces from Afghanistan – at the time, 2,400 soldiers in Kapisa Province – by 2013.

Also in early 2012, Longuet led efforts on an agreement between France and Britain to jointly work to develop unmanned drones as part of their military cooperation.

Following the 2012 Malian coup d'état, Longuet rejected the desert Tuaregs' declaration of independence for what they called the state of Azawad.

=== Later career ===
As part of a reorganisation of the UMP leadership under their leader Jean-François Copé in January 2013, Longuet became – alongside Christian Estrosi, Henri de Raincourt, Jean-Claude Gaudin, Brice Hortefeux and Roger Karoutchi – one of the party's six vice presidents and served until December 2014.

Ahead of The Republicans' 2016 presidential primary, Longuet endorsed François Fillon as the party's candidate for the 2017 French presidential election.

From 2017 to 2020, Longuet served as president of the Parliamentary Office for the Evaluation of Scientific and Technological Choices (OPECST).

== Controversy ==
=== Legal issues ===
In 2005, Longuet was the only one among 47 persons prosecuted who was found not guilty in a trial over claims that construction companies had paid money to political parties in return for contracts.

=== Human rights ===
In 2008, Longuet compared homosexuality to pedophilia, and he said gay pride parades may lead LGBT teenagers to suicide. He has said he does not remember saying it, even though there is footage of it.

== Other activities ==
- John Cockerill, Independent Member of the Board of Directors
- Carrefour de l'Horloge, Member

== Personal life ==
Longuet's brother-in-law is billionaire Vincent Bolloré.

== Overview ==
Electoral mandates

European Parliament

Member of European Parliament: 1984–1986 (became minister in 1986).

General council

Vice President of the General Council of Meuse: 1982–1986.

General councillor of Meuse: 1979–1992 / 1998–2001 (Resignation). Reelected in 1985, 1998.

Municipal council

Municipal councillor of Bar-le-Duc: 1983–1989.

Political offices
Preceded by Alain Juppé	Minister of Defence and Veterans Affairs; 2011–2012	Succeeded by Jean-Yves Le Drian
