= Édouard von Jaunez =

French-German businessman, engineer, and politician

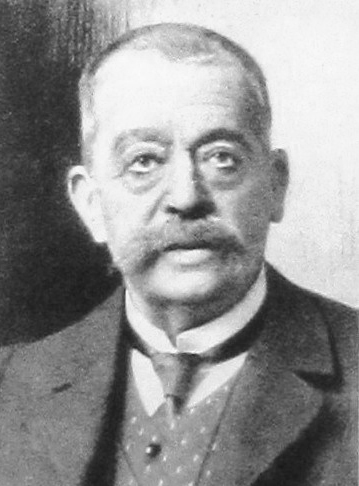

President of the Reichsland Alsace–Lorraine Committee
- In office 1904–1911
- Monarch: Wilhelm II

President of the Regional Council of Lorraine
- In office 1877–1890
- Monarchs: Wilhelm I Frederick III; Wilhelm II

Member of the Reichstag
- In office 1874–1887
- Monarch: Wilhelm I

Mayor of Sarreguemines
- In office 1874–1876
- Monarch: Wilhelm I

Personal details
- Born: Édouard Jaunez; 12 November 1834 Metz, Bezirk Lothringen, Alsace–Lorraine, France
- Died: 26 June 1916 (aged 81)
- Party: Alsace-Lorraine Party
- Spouse: Berthe de Geiger
- Children: Maximilian von Jaunez
- Parents: Auguste Jaunez (father); Catherine Elise Souty (mother)
- Education: École Centrale Paris
- Occupation: politician, engineer, businessman

Édouard von Jaunez (12 November 1834 – 26 June 1916) was a French-German businessman, engineer, and politician. He was a prominent industrialist who owned and operated ceramics factories in France, Germany, Belgium, and Luxembourg. Jaunez served in various political capacities, including as the mayor of Sarreguemines, as president of the Regional Council of Lorraine, and as a member of the Reichstag of the German Empire. He was elevated to the nobility, as a hereditary knight, by Emperor Wilhelm II on 11 May 1904.

== Early life ==
Jaunez was born on 12 November 1834 in German-ruled Metz. His father was Auguste Jaunez, an engineer, and his mother was Catherine Elise Souty.

He studied engineering at École Centrale Paris.

== Career ==
In 1864, Jaunez co-founded the ceramics factory Utzschneider & Ed. Jaunez in Sarreguemines with Charles Joseph and Maximilian Utzschneider. He also acquired and founded other ceramics factories including one in Paray-le-Monial in 1862, one in Wasserbillig in 1873, one in Jurbise in 1876, one in Pont-Sainte-Maxence in 1881, one in Zahna in 1890, and one in Betschdorf in 1901.

In 1874, Jaunez was elected as mayor of Sarreguemines and served in this capacity until 1876. While serving as mayor, he also served as a member of the Imperial Reichstag as a member of the Alsace-Lorraine Party representing Alsace-Lorraine. He remained a member of the Reichstag until 1887. From 1877 to 1890, he was the president of the Regional Council of Lorraine. He was a member, and later president, of the Reichsland Alsace-Lorraine Committee from 1904 to 1911.

== Personal life ==
Jaunez was Catholic.

In 1860, he married Berthe de Geiger. They had a son, Maximilian, who was also a member of the Reichstag from 1903 to 1907. Jaunez's granddaughter, from his son's first marriage to Jeanne de Montagnac, was Nelly de Vogüé, a mistress of Antoine de Saint-Exupéry.

He was elevated to the Prussian nobility, as a hereditary knight, by Emperor Wilhelm II on 11 May 1904.

Jaunez died on 26 June 1916.
