= Regional Council of Lorraine =

Regional legislature in France

Regional Council of Lorraine: Conseil régional de Lorraine (French); Regionalrat von Lothringen (German)
- Logo of the Council

History
- Disbanded: 31 December 2015
- Succeeded by: Regional Council of Grand Est

Leadership
- President: Jean-Pierre Masseret, PS since 28 March 2004

Meeting place
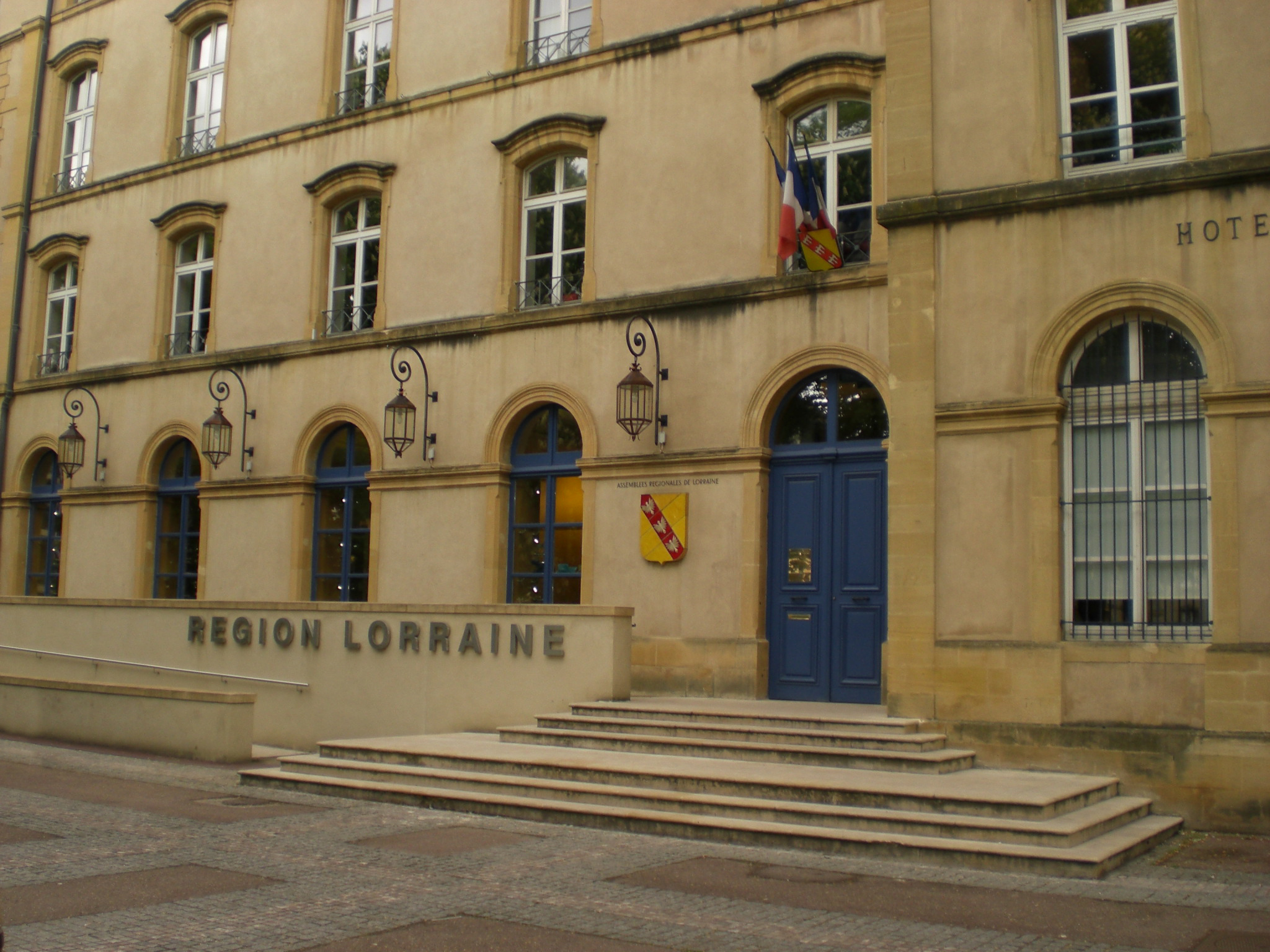
- Place Gabriel Hocquard, 57000 Metz

Website
- www.lorraine.eu

The Regional Council of Lorraine (French: Conseil régional de Lorraine, German: Regionalrat von Lothringen) was the deliberative assembly of the former French region of Lorraine until December 31, 2015, following the region's incorporation with Champagne-Ardenne and Alsace to form the new Grand Est region.

It has 73 members and sits in the former abbey of Saint-Clément, in the Pontiffroy district of Metz. The Hôtel de Région is one of the many sites occupied by the Regional Council: boulevard de Trèves (recently renovated military buildings), Sainte-Barbe and Blida for Metz (there is also a site in Nancy).

Its last president was Jean-Pierre Masseret (PS), elected on March 28, 2004.

The Regional Council of Lorraine was also a member of the cross-border inter-regional cooperation called Grande Région, or "SaarLorLux".

== Presidents of the regional council ==
List of successive presidents
Period		Name	Party	Other mandates	References
1877	1890	Édouard von Jaunez	Alsace-Lorraine	Mayor of Sarreguemines	
1974	1976	John Vilmain	CNIP	President of the departmental council of Vosges	
1976	1978	Jean-Jacques Servan-Schreiber	PR	Deputy	
1978	1979	Pierre Messmer	RPR	Former Prime Minister, deputy, mayor of Sarrebourg	
1979	1982	André Madoux	RPR	President of the departmental council of Meuse	
1982	1992	Jean-Marie Rausch	DVD then DVG	Minister, senator, mayor of Metz, departmental councillor	
1992	2004	Gérard Longuet	UDF / UMP	President of SaarLorLux, minister, deputy, senator, general councillor	
2004	2015	Jean-Pierre Masseret	PS	Former minister, senator	

== Vice-presidents ==
The President of the Regional Council is assisted by vice-presidents chosen from among the regional councillors. Each of them has a delegation of authority.

Following the list of vice-presidents of the Council from 2010 to 2015:

- 1st Vice-Phairman: Jean-Yves Le Deaut
- 2nd Vice-President: Laurence Demonet
- 3rd Vice-President: Daniel Beguin
- 4th Vice-President: Lovely Chretien
- 5th Vice-President: Patrick Abate
- 6th Vice-President: Paola Zanetti
- 7th Vice-President: Jean-Pierre Liouville
- 8th Vice-President: Jacqueline Fontaine
- 9th Vice-President: Christian Franqueville
- 10th Vice-President: Rachel Thomas
- 11th Vice-President: Patrick Hatzig
- 12th Vice-President: Josiane Madelaine
- 13th Vice-President: Michel Obiegala
- 14th Vice-President: Angèle Dufflo
- 15th Vice-President: Thibaut Villemin

== Composition ==
Composition by party (2010-2015)
Majority (46 seats)
Party	Group name	Elected
Socialist Party (PS)	Socialist	32
Europe Ecology (EE)	Europe Ecologie Lorraine	9
French Communist Party (PCF)	Communist	5
Opposition (27 seats)
Union for a Popular Movement (UMP)	Majorité présidentielle-nouveau centre	17
National Front (FN)	National Front	6
Independent (not affiliated)	Je suis Lorrain	3
