= Auguste Hilarion Touret =

French military philhellene (1797–1858)

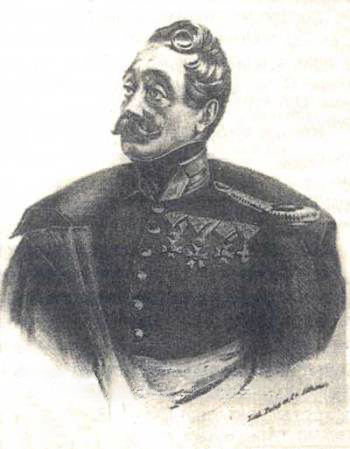
Colonel Auguste Hilarion Touret

Auguste Hilarion Touret (Sarreguemines, 1797 – Piraeus, 1858) was a French philhellene officer and a participant in the Greek Revolution. In addition to the direct contribution to the war of liberation of Greece, historiography owes him a detailed list of Western Philhellenes, who participated in the war. Modern British historian William St Clair, in his work on Philhellenes, uses lists Touret, who is mentioned by him as Thouret.

== Biography ==
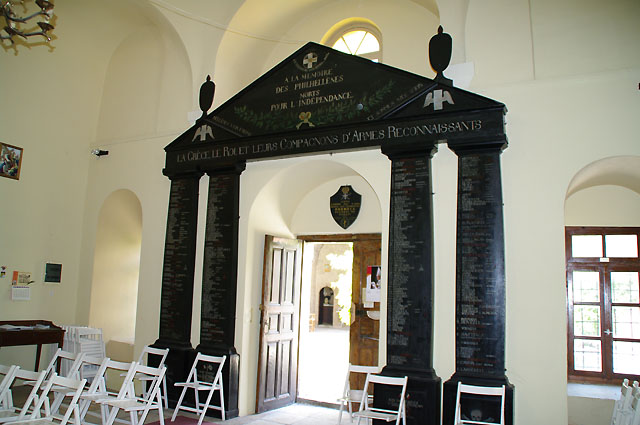
The "Touret arch" in Nafplion, with engraved names of philhellenes

Auguste Touret was born in 1797 in the city of Sarreguemines in the family of officer Hilarion Touret. He served in French army until 1825, when he followed other French philhellenes in Greece. Upon arrival and in the rank of major, he was appointed by Charles Nicolas Fabvier to the staff of the first regular regiment of Greek army. He took part in the Battle of Phaleron and in the failed attempt to regain island of Chios in 1827 After reconstitution of Greek state, Touret remain in Greece. After creation of lists of Philhellenes and with his own money, Touret built in the only Catholic church in the Nafplio so-called "Arch of Touret" with the names of dead Philhellenes. By 1855, Touret was sent to France for treatment. But Touret wished to die in Greece, to which he devoted the best years of his life. He died of a heart attack 28 August 1858, while he was on board of steamship already entering Piraeus harbor and when he saw again the battlefield of his youth.
