= Department of Lorraine =

District of Alsace-Lorraine

Coordinates: 49°02′N 6°39′E

Department of Lorraine Bezirk Lothringen (German) Présidence de Lorraine (French)
- Department of Alsace-Lorraine
- 1871–1918
- Flag Coat of arms

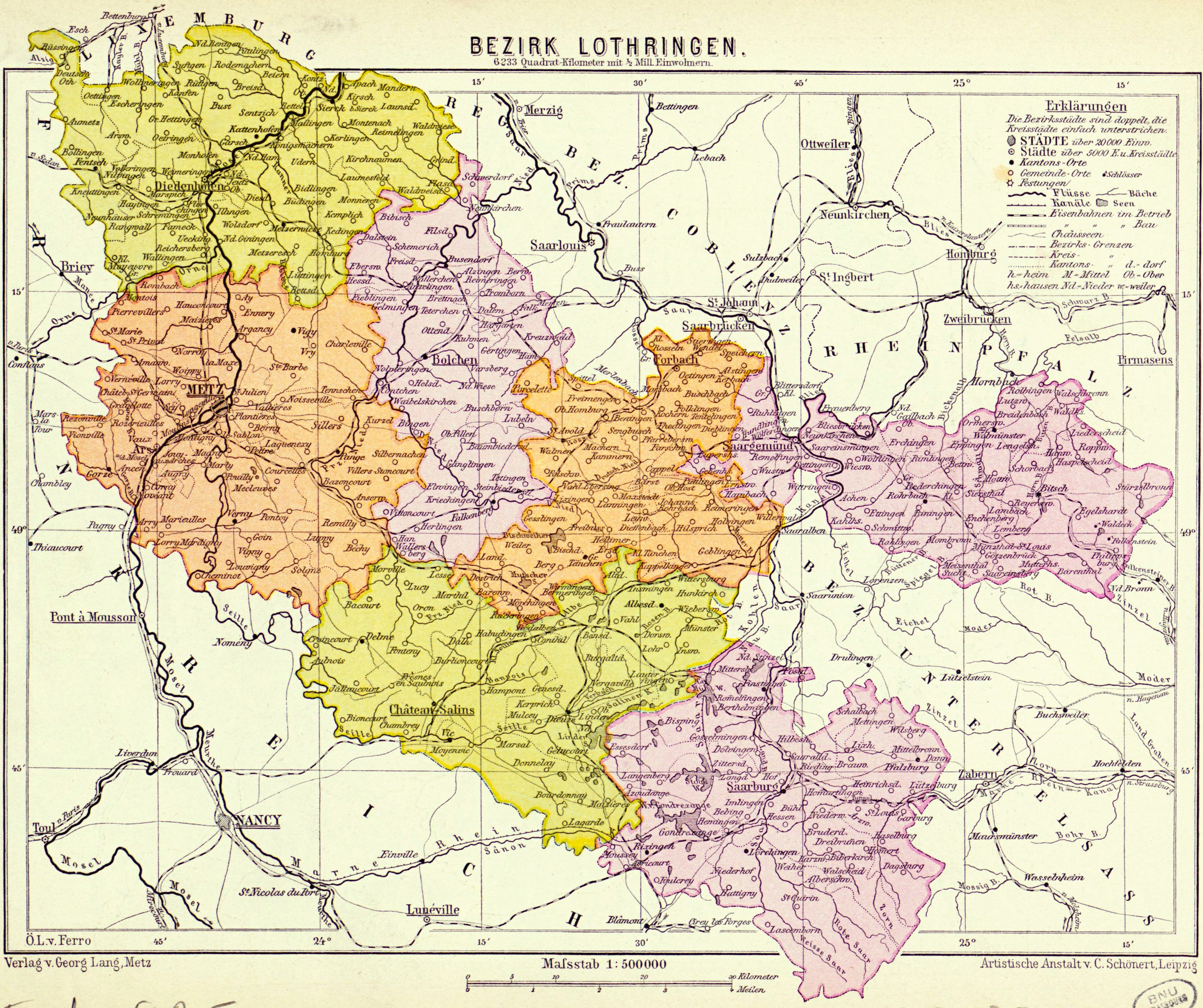
- Lorraine department with its districts in different colours (1890)
- Capital: Metz
- Area
  - 1900: 6,223 km^{2} (2,403 sq mi)
  - 1910: 6,228 km^{2} (2,405 sq mi)
- Population
  - 1900: 564,829
  - 1910: 655,211
- Government
  - Type: regional administration
- Bezirkspräsident
  - 1871–1872: G.H. von Donnersmarck
  - 1872–1873: Botho zu Eulenburg
  - 1875–1876: Robert von Puttkamer
- Präsident des Bezirkstags (speaker of parl.)
  - 1874–1881: Auguste-François Adam
  - 1881–1911: Édouard Jaunez
  - 1911–1918: Georges Ditsch
- Legislature: Bezirkstag (parliament)
- Historical era: 19th and 20th century
  - Franco-Prussian War: 1870–1871
  - seized to Germany: 19 May 1871
  - reorganisation acc. to German standards: 1871
  - Bezirkstag est.: 1874
  - reg. carsign VI C: 1906
  - French occupation: 1918–1920
  - seized to France Versailles Tr. (effective): 10 January 1918
  - reconstituted as Moselle dept.: 1920
- Political subdivisions: 8 rural districts (as of 1901); 1 urban district (Metz)
Preceded by	Succeeded by
Moselle (old); Meurthe (department)	Moselle (department)
- Today part of: France

Bezirk Lothringen (today's French: Présidence de la Lorraine, at the time translated into French: Département de la Lorraine i.e. Department of Lorraine), also called German Lorraine (Deutsch Lothringen), was a government region ("Bezirk") in the western part of Alsace-Lorraine when it was part of the German Empire from 1871 to 1918.

== History ==
The Department or District of Lorraine differed from other Prussian government regions, as it was not a simple governorate. As a corporation of self-rule of the pertaining rural and urban districts and cantons, it was similar to regions in the then neighbouring Bavaria (Palatinate), which had been formed after the French model départements into which that region had been divided under French annexation. Thus the district parliaments delegated deputies to the General Council (parliament), the Bezirkstag von Lothringen (French: Conseil Général de la Lorraine). The capital of the Department of Lorraine was Metz.

== Territorial composition ==
The department comprised the districts ("Kreise") of :

1. Metz, independent city (Stadtkreis)
2. "Kreis Bolchen", seated in Bolchen (Boulay)
3. "Kreis Château-Salins", seated in Château-Salins
4. "Kreis Diedenhofen-Ost", seated in Diedenhofen (Thionville)
5. "Kreis Diedenhofen-West", seated in Diedenhofen (Thionville)
6. "Kreis Forbach", seated in Forbach
7. "Kreis Metz-Land", seated in Metz
8. "Kreis Saarburg", seated in Saarburg (Sarrebourg)
9. "Kreis Saargemünd", seated in Saargemünd (Sarreguemines)

The department of Lorraine corresponds exactly to the current département of Moselle. After the outbreak of the Second World War and the defeat of France in 1940, the département of Moselle, renamed CdZ-Gebiet Lothringen, was added to the Gau Westmark on 30 November 1940.

== Department presidents ==
(German: Bezirkspräsident/today's French: Président de district)

- 1871-1872 : Guido Henckel von Donnersmarck, as préfet/Präfekt
- 1872-1873 : Botho zu Eulenburg, as department president
- 1873-1874 : Adolf von Arnim-Boitzenburg
- 1875-1876 : Robert von Puttkamer
- 1877-1880 : Friedrich Albrecht Karl Johann von Reitzenstein
- 1881-1882 : Adalbert von Flottwell
- 1883-1900 : Hans von Hammerstein-Loxten
- 1901-1912 : Johann Friedrich Alexander von Zeppelin-Aschhausen
- 1913-1918 : Karl von Gemmingen-Hornberg

== Bibliography ==
- Amtsblatt für den Bezirk Lothringen / Recueil officiel des actes administratifs du Département de la Lorraine (departmental legal gazette; appeared December 1870 to 1918)
- Ernst Bruck, Das Verfassungs- und Verwaltungsrecht von Elsaß-Lothringen: 3 vols., Straßburg im Elsass: Trübner, 1908–1910.
- Stefan Fisch, „Das Elsaß im deutschen Kaiserreich (1870/71–1918)“, in: Das Elsass: Historische Landschaft im Wandel der Zeit, Michael Erbe (ed.), Stuttgart: Kohlhammer Verlag, 2003, pp. 123–146. ISBN 3-17-015771-X.
- Georg Lang, Der Regierungs-Bezirk Lothringen: statistisch-topographisches Handbuch, Verwaltung-Schematismus und Adressbuch, Metz: Lang, 1874
- Verhandlungen des Bezirkstages von Lothringen / Procès-verbaux des délibérations du Conseil Général de la Lorraine, Metz (proceedings of the departmental parliament sessions, appeared from 1874 to 1918)
