= German Lorraine =

German-speaking region

Dialects in the department of Moselle

The Germanic and Romance dialect groups in Alsace-Lorraine (19th century)

The region of German Lorraine (German: Deutsch-Lothringen or Deutschlothringen) was the German-speaking part of Lorraine, now in France, that existed for centuries into the 20th century. Following its annexation by France in the 18th century, it became part of the German Empire following the Franco-Prussian War and ceased to exist permanently following Nazi Germany's surrender. The name is also used more specifically to refer to Bezirk Lothringen, the part of Lorraine that belonged to the German Empire from 1871 to 1918 and to Nazi Germany from 1940 to 1945.

== Former German-speaking Lorraine ==
The Germanic-Romance (German-French) language boundary in Lorraine roughly followed the line from Sarrebourg (Saarburg) to Hayange (Hayingen) until well into the 20th century. A detailed map of the boundary is given in the article on the Lorraine Franconian dialect. The Lorraine region northeast of this linguistic boundary in the present-day départements of Moselle and Bas-Rhin (the Alsace bossue) and in the present-day federal state of Saarland was called German Lorraine (Deutsch-Lothringen). Nancy, the historic capital of Lorraine, and Metz, the present capital of the region of Lorraine, both lie on the French side of the boundary. There are clues to the historic boundary in the names of settlements like Audun-le-Tiche (Deutsch-Oth or German Audun) and Audun-le-Roman (Welsch-Oth or Romance Audun) or the names of the two headstreams of the Nied, the Nied Allemande (Deutsche Nied or German Nied) and the Nied Française (Französische Nied or French Nied), which lie on either side of the language boundary and merge almost exactly on the line itself.

The linguistic boundary was also reflected early on in the administration of the region. In the 13th century, the Duchy of Lorraine was divided into three bailiwicks (administrative and juridical districts. German: Ballei, French: Bailliage): the Bailiwick of Nancy (Bailliage de Nancy), the Bailiwick of Vosges (Bailliage des Vosges) and the German Bailiwick (Bailliage d'Allemagne); the last-named periodically had its administrative seat in the town of Wallerfangen in present-day Saarland. The Duchy of Lorraine went to France in 1766. In 1790, during the time of the French Revolution, the old administrative structures were radically changed. The request by German Lorraine members of parliament to establish a German Lorraine département did not gain majority support in the French National Assembly. So in 1790, German Lorraine was incorporated into the newly created départements of Moselle and Meurthe. Other German-speaking parts of historic Lorraine lay in the département of Forêts formed in 1795 and the Département de la Sarre created in 1798. In the Second Treaty of Paris in 1815 the largest part of German Lorraine remained with France. From then on the name referred to this region.

== Bezirk Lothringen as part of the German Reich 1871-1918 ==
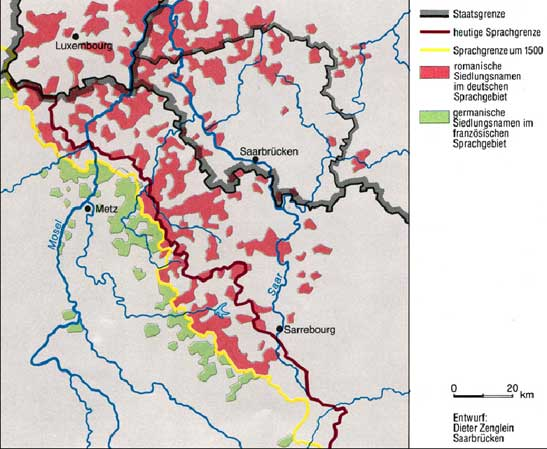
Historical development of the language border in Lorraine (red Line actual border; yellow line border around the year 1500)

After the Franco-Prussian War in 1871, part of Lorraine was annexed by the newly founded German Empire and, together with Alsace formed the Imperial Territory of Alsace-Lorraine (Reichsland Elsaß-Lothringen) until 1918. The newly formed Bezirk Lothringen, which was created from parts of the former French départements of Meurthe and Moselle, covered not just the majority of historical German Lorraine but also the French-speaking regions west of the Franco-German language boundary around Metz and Château-Salins. Bezirk Lothringen, with Metz as its capital, remained unchanged in its territorial composition after the return of the region to France in 1919 and formed the present département of Moselle. During the German occupation of 1940–1944 it became the CdZ-Gebiet Lothringen ("Territory of the Chief of Civil Administration of Lorraine").
