= Paul César Helleu =

French painter (1859–1927)

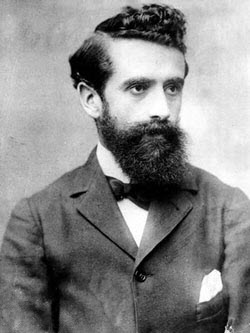
- Helleu, c. 1880s
- Born: 17 December 1859; Vannes, Brittany, France
- Died: 23 March 1927 (aged 67); Paris, France
- Education: École des Beaux-Arts
- Known for: Etcher, painter
- Notable work: Portrait d’Alice Guérin; Grand Central Terminal ceiling
- Movement: Post-Impressionism
- Awards: Légion d'honneur (1904)

Paul César Helleu (17 December 1859 – 23 March 1927) was a French oil painter, pastel artist, drypoint etcher, and designer, best known for his numerous portraits of beautiful society women of the Belle Époque. He also conceived the ceiling mural of night sky constellations for Grand Central Terminal in New York City. He was also the father of Jean Helleu and the grandfather of Jacques Helleu, both artistic directors for Parfums Chanel.

== Biography ==
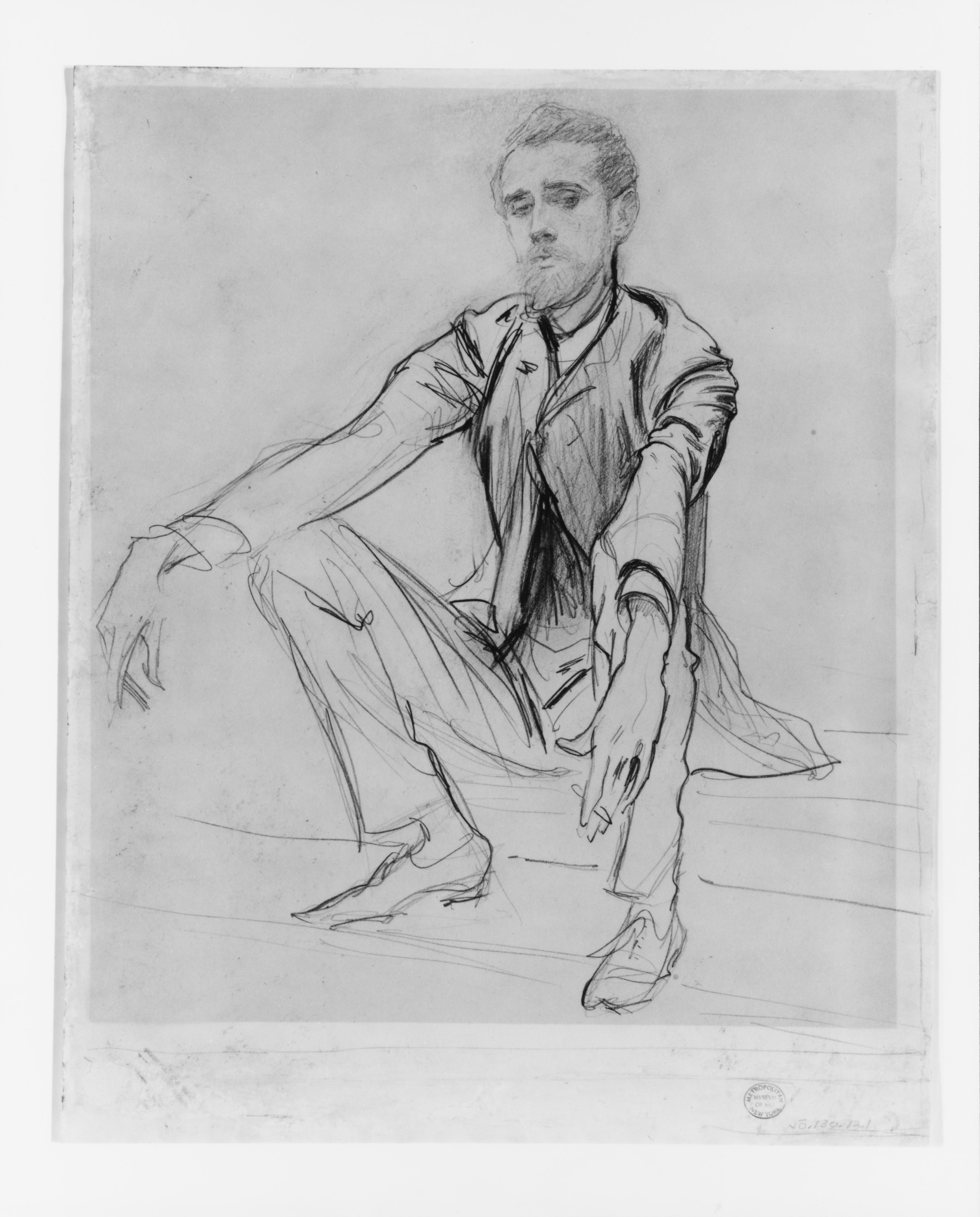
Drawing of Helleu by John Singer Sargent from the early 1880s. Sargent cherished this candid drawing of his lifelong friend and hung it in the dining room of his Paris apartment.

Paul César Helleu was born in Vannes, Brittany, France. His father, who was a customs receiver, died when Helleu was in his teens. Despite opposition from his mother, he then went to Paris and studied at Lycée Chaptal. In 1876, at age 16, he was admitted to the École des Beaux-Arts, beginning academic training in art with Jean-Léon Gérôme. Helleu attended the Second Impressionist Exhibition in the same year, and made his first acquaintances with John Singer Sargent, James McNeill Whistler, and Claude Monet. He was struck by their modern, bold alla prima technique and outdoor scenes, so far removed from the studio. Following graduation, Helleu took a job with the firm Théodore Deck Ceramique Française hand-painting fine decorative plates. At this same time, he met Giovanni Boldini, a portrait painter with a facile, bravura style, who became a mentor and comrade, and strongly influenced his future artistic style.

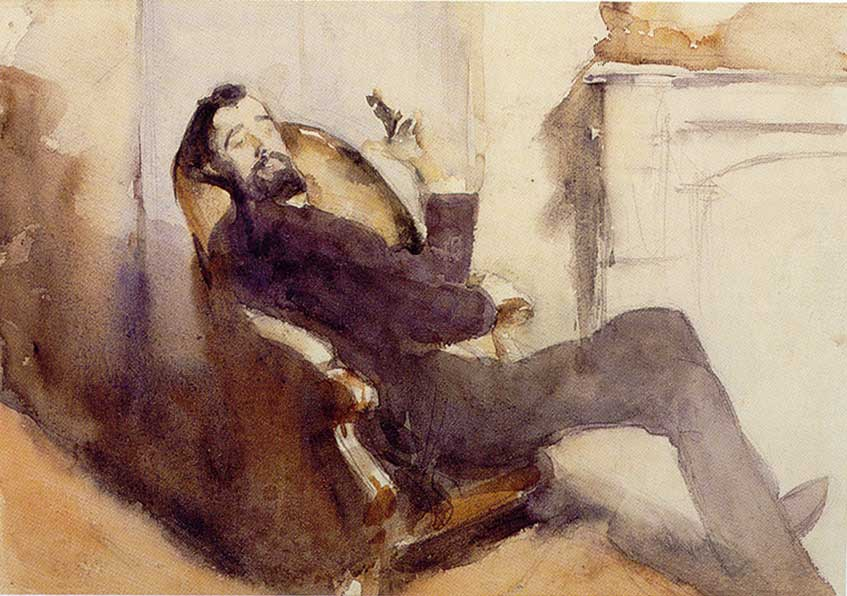
Paul Helleu (watercolor), John Singer Sargent, c. 1882–1885

When he was 18 years old, Helleu established a close friendship with John Singer Sargent, four years his senior, that was to last his lifetime. Already becoming established, Sargent was receiving commissions for his work. Helleu had not sold anything, and was deeply discouraged almost to the point of abandoning his studies. When Sargent heard this, he went to Helleu and picked one of his paintings, praising his technique. Flattered that Sargent would praise his work, he offered to give it to him. Sargent replied, "I shall gladly accept this, Helleu, but not as a gift. I sell my own pictures, and I know what they cost me by the time they are out of my hand. I should never enjoy this pastel if I hadn't paid you a fair and honest price for it." With this he paid him a thousand-franc note.

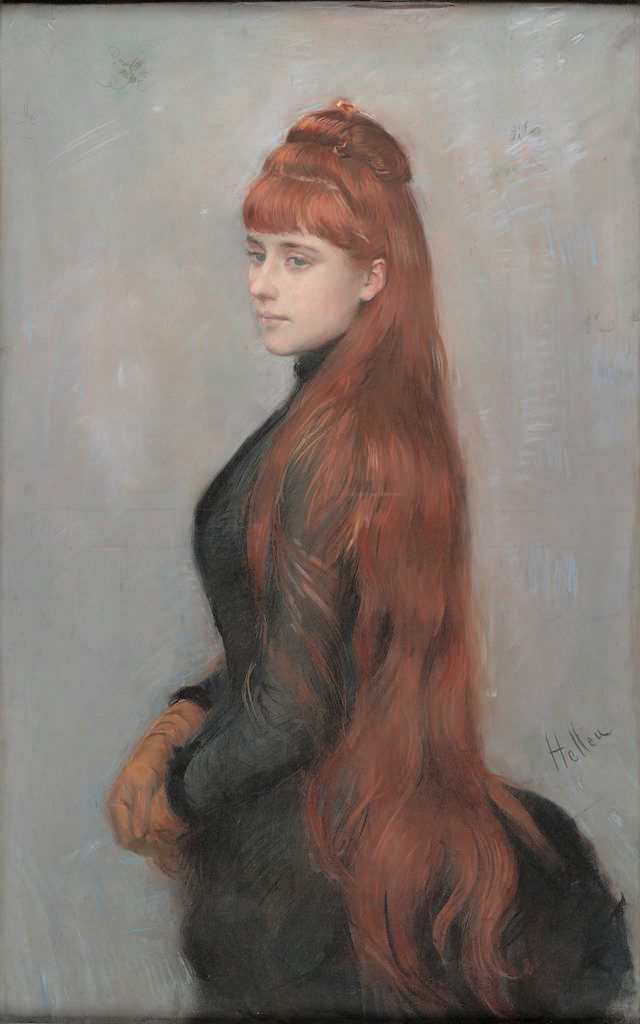
Portrait d’Alice Guérin, Helleu's future wife

Helleu was commissioned in 1884 to paint a portrait of a young woman named Alice Guérin (1870–1933). They fell in love, and married on 28 July 1886. Throughout their lives together, she was his favourite model. Charming, refined and graceful, she helped introduce them to the aristocratic circles of Paris, where they became popular fixtures.

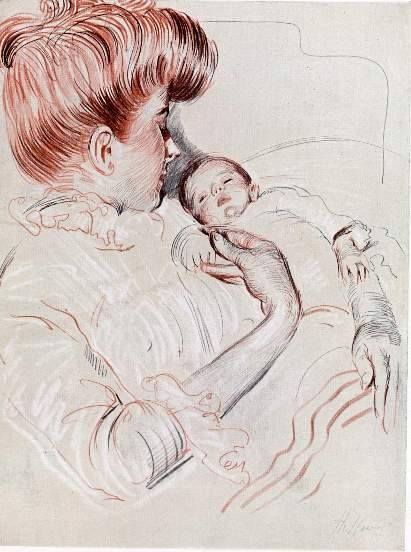
Helleu - Berceuse

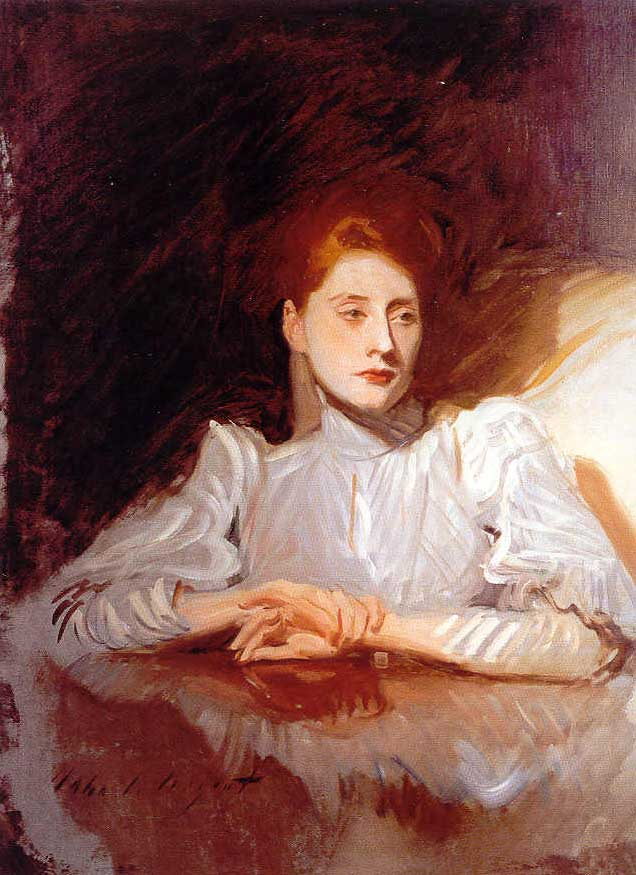
Madame Helleu, John Singer Sargent, c. 1889

On a trip to London with Jacques-Émile Blanche in 1885, Helleu met Whistler again and visited other prominent artists. His introduction to James Jacques Tissot, an accomplished society painter from France who made his career in England, proved a revelation. In Tissot, Helleu saw, for the first time, the possibilities of drypoint etching with a diamond point stylus directly on a copper plate. Helleu quickly became a virtuoso of the technique, drawing with the same dynamic and sophisticated freedom with his stylus as with his pastels. His prints were very well received, and they had the added advantage that a sitter could have several proofs printed to give to relations or friends. Over the course of his career, Helleu produced more than 2,000 drypoint prints.

Soon, Helleu was displaying works to much acclaim at several galleries. Degas encouraged him to submit paintings to the Eighth Impressionist Exhibition in May and June 1886. The show was installed in a Paris apartment at 1 rue Laffitte, which ran concurrently with the official Salon that year to make a statement. Although 17 artists joined the famous exhibit that included the first Neo-Impressionistic works, Helleu, like Monet, refused to participate.

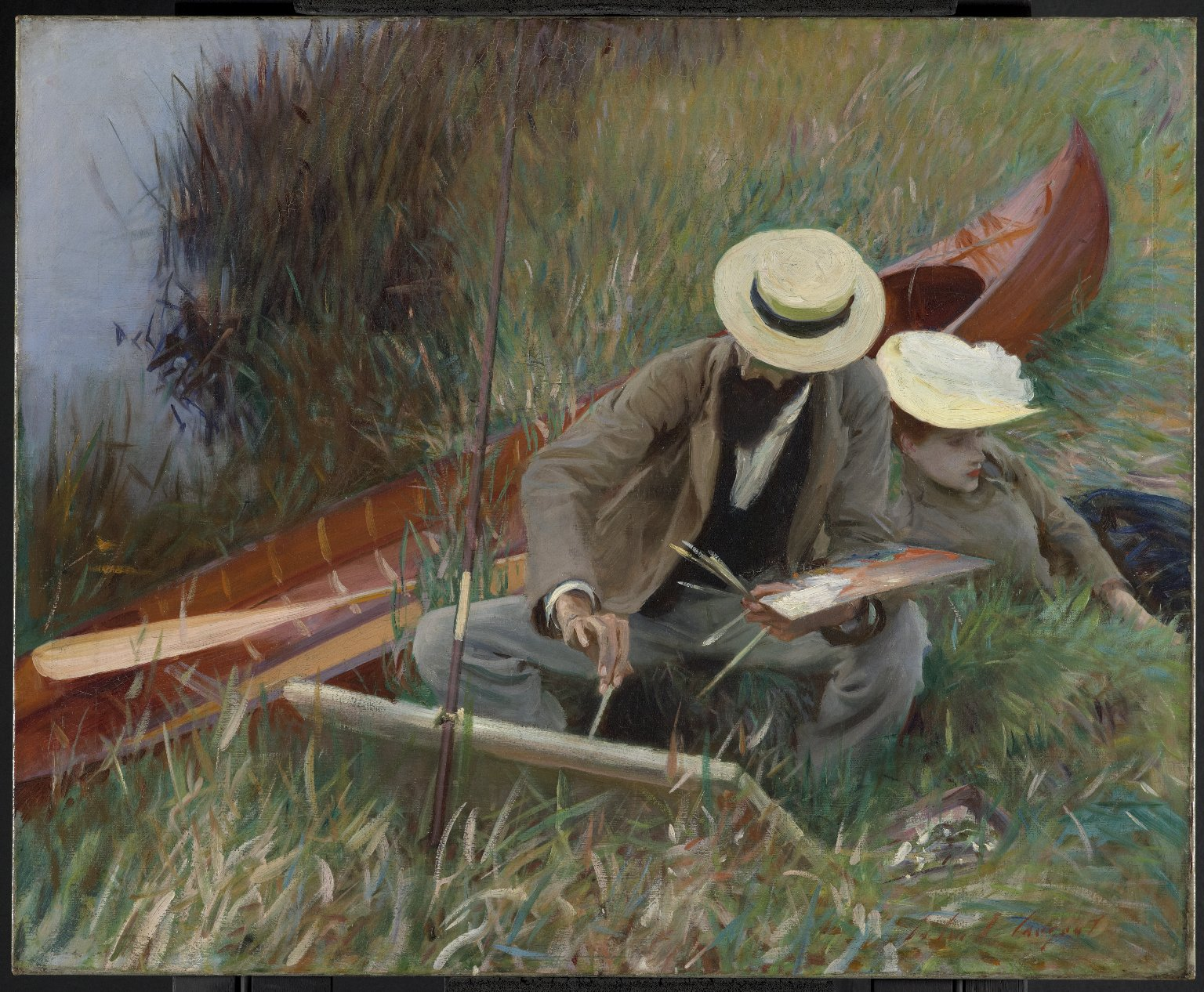
Paul Helleu Sketching with His Wife (1889), by John Singer Sargent, The Brooklyn Museum, New York

In 1886, Helleu befriended Robert de Montesquiou, the poet and aesthete, who bought six of his drypoints to add to his large print collection. Montesquiou later wrote a book about Helleu that was published in 1913 with reproductions of 100 of his prints and drawings. This volume remains the definitive biography of Helleu. Montesquiou introduced Helleu to Parisian literary salons, where he met Marcel Proust, who also became a friend. Proust created a literary picture of Helleu in his novel Remembrance of Things Past as the painter Elstir. Later, Helleu engraved a well-known portrait of Proust on his deathbed. Montesquiou's cousin, Countess Greffulhe, enabled Helleu to expand his career as a portrait artist to elegant women in the highest ranks of Paris society, portraits that provide the basis for his modern reputation. His subjects included the Duchess of Marlborough, the Marchesa Casati, Belle da Costa Greene, Jeanne de Montagnac, Louise Chéruit, and Helena Rubinstein.

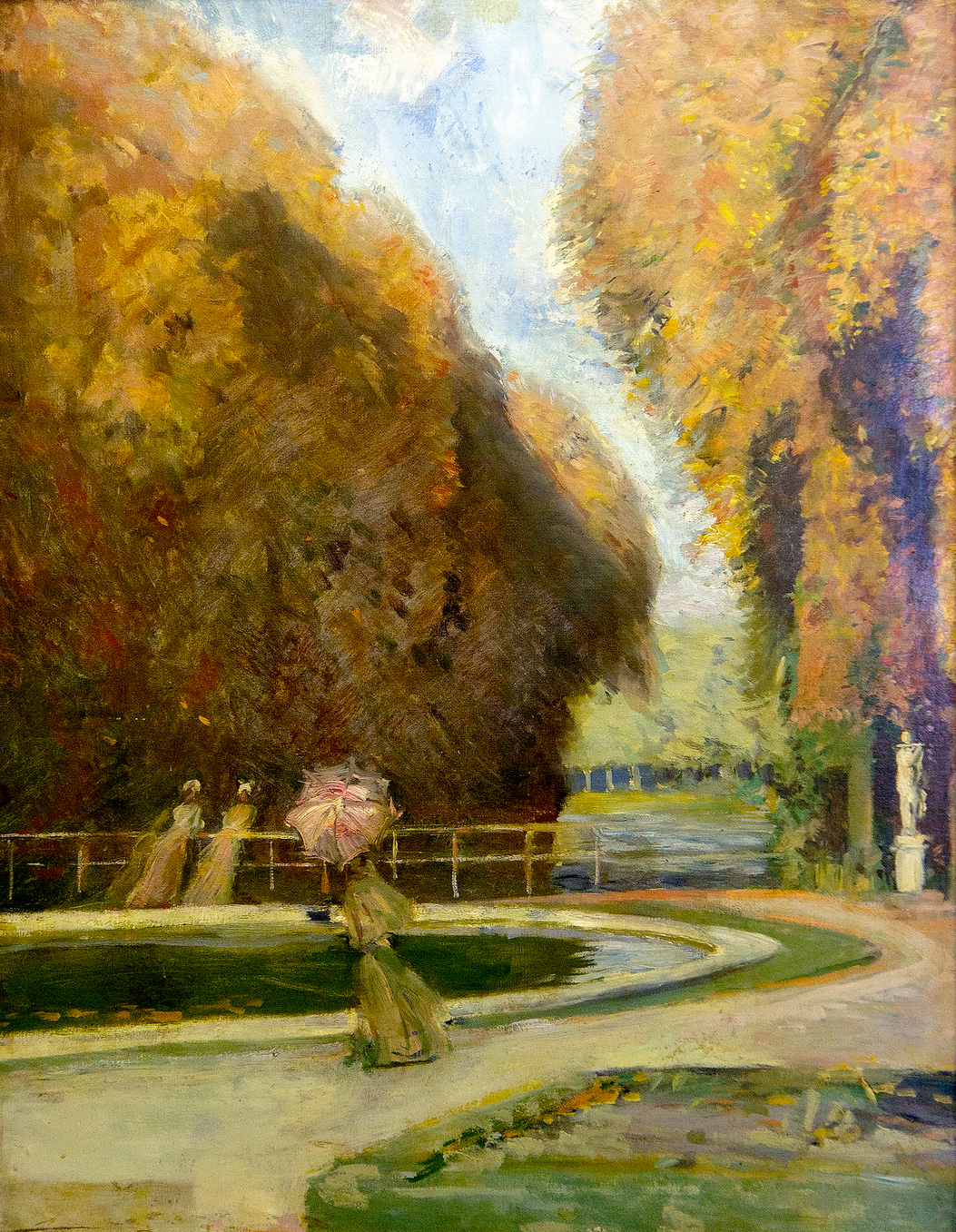
Paul Helleu 1908c Trois femmes dans le parc de Versailles

Looking for new inspiration, Helleu began a series of paintings and color prints of cathedrals and stained glass windows in 1893, followed by flower studies and landscapes of parks in Versailles. Helleu took up sailing, owning four yachts over his life. Ships, harbor views, life at port in Deauville, and women in their fashionable seaside attire became subjects for many vivid and spirited works.

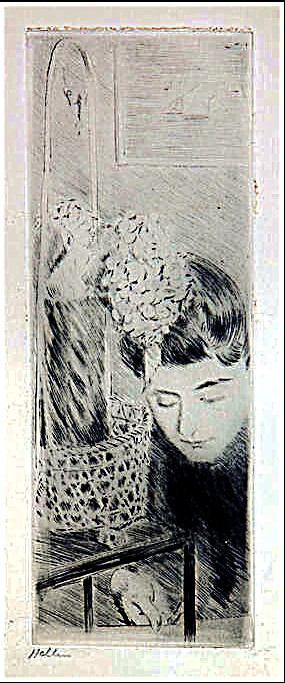
Femme avec hortensias, vers 1897–1898. Musée Bonnat

In 1904, Helleu was awarded the Légion d'honneur and became one of the most celebrated artists of the Edwardian era in both Paris and London. He was an honorary member in important beaux-arts societies, including the International Society of Painters, Sculptors, and Engravers, headed by Auguste Rodin, and the Société Nationale des Beaux-Arts.

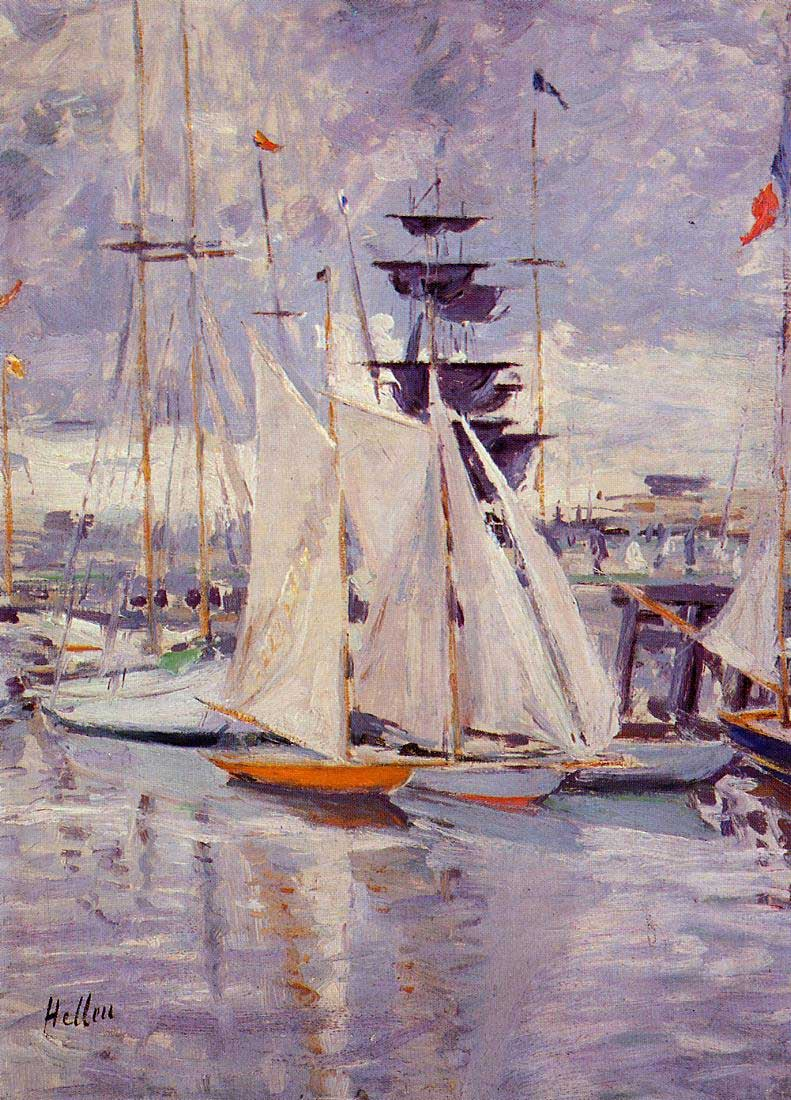
Helleu - The Harbor at Deauville

On his second trip to the United States in 1912, Helleu was awarded the commission to design the ceiling decoration in New York City's Grand Central Terminal. He decided on a mural of a blue-green night sky covered by the starry signs of the zodiac that cross the Milky Way. Although the astrological design was widely admired, the ceiling was covered in the 1930s. It was completely restored in 1998.

Helleu made his last trip to New York City in 1920 for an exhibition of his work, but he realized that the Belle Époque was over. He felt out of touch, and shortly after his return to France, he destroyed nearly all of his copper plates and retired to family life. While planning for a new exhibition with Jean-Louis Forain, he died in 1927 at age 67 of peritonitis following surgery in Paris.

Among many of his friends was Coco Chanel, who chose beige as her signature colour upon on his advice—the colour of the sand on the beach of Biarritz in early morning. Both his son Jean Helleu and his grandson Jacques Helleu became artistic directors for Parfums Chanel.

An online Catalogue raisonné providing an overview of his work is under development by L'association Les Amis de Paul-César Helleu.

== Pastel portraits ==
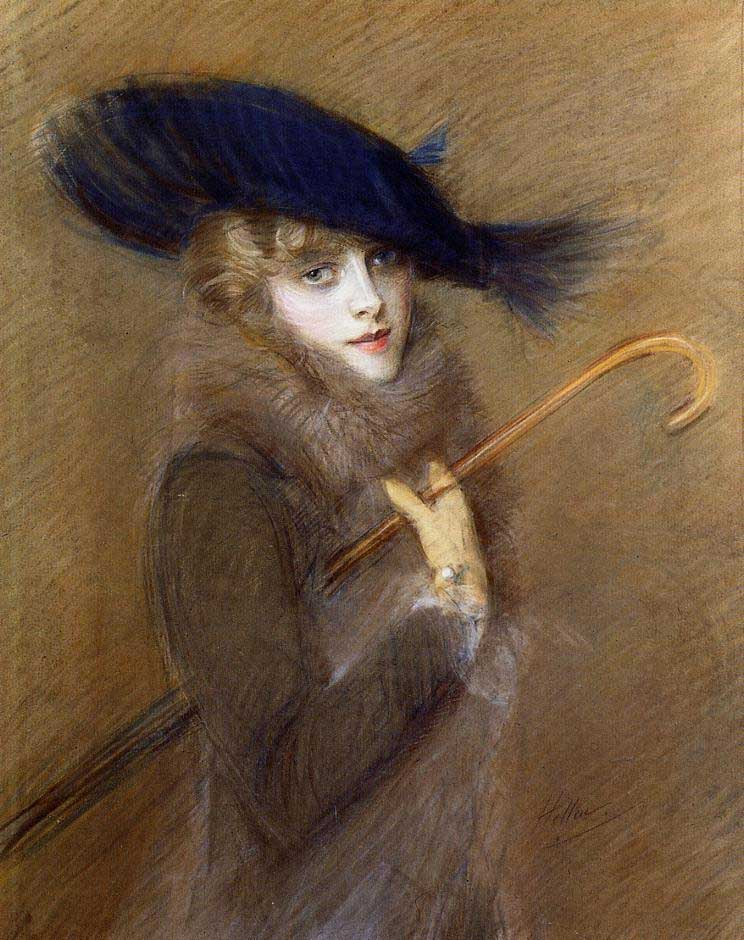
Peggy Letellier,
pastel, 1905

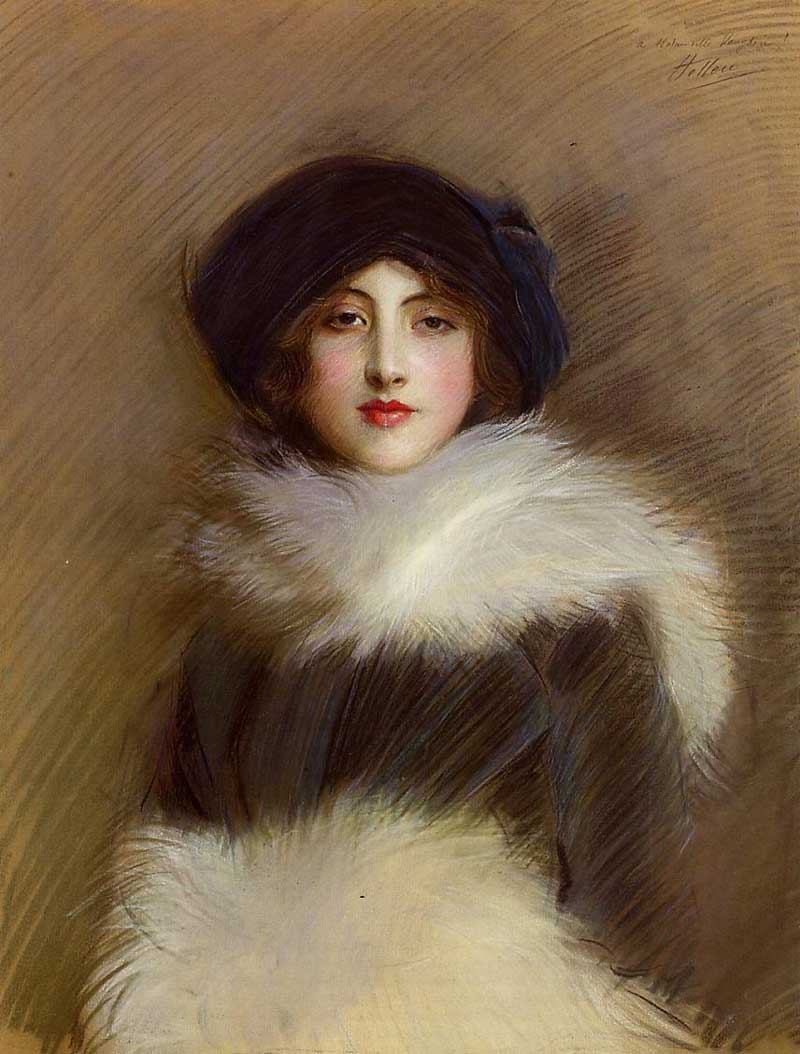
Mademoiselle Vaughan,
pastel, 1905

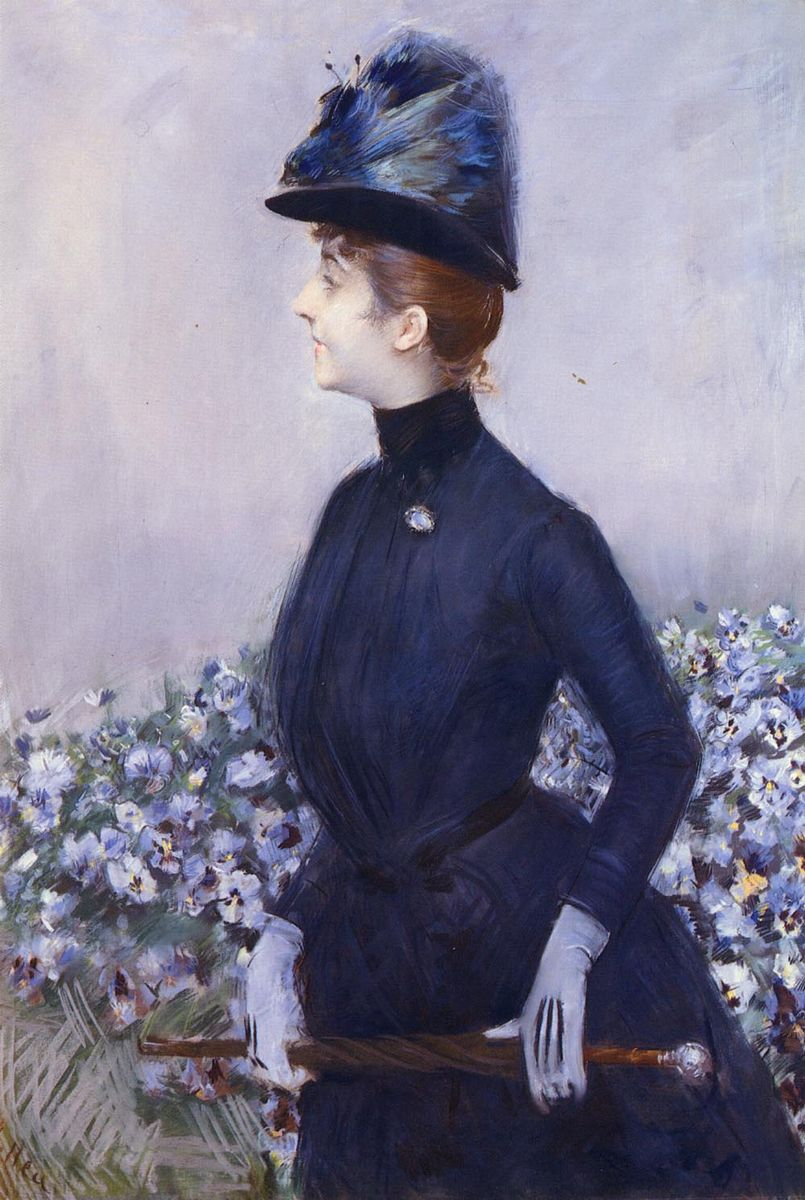
Lady with Flowers, pastel on linen, 1910

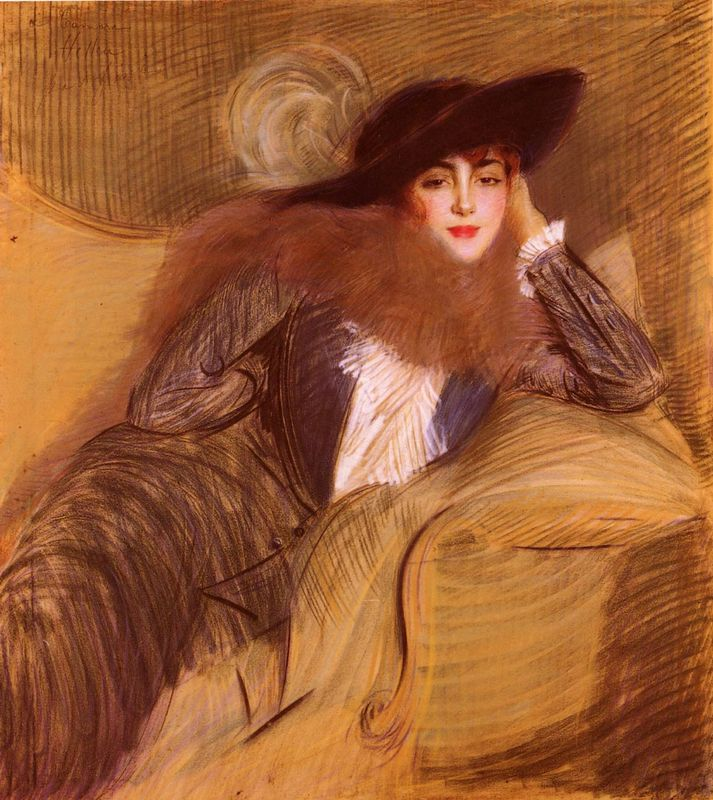
Camara,
pastel, 1905

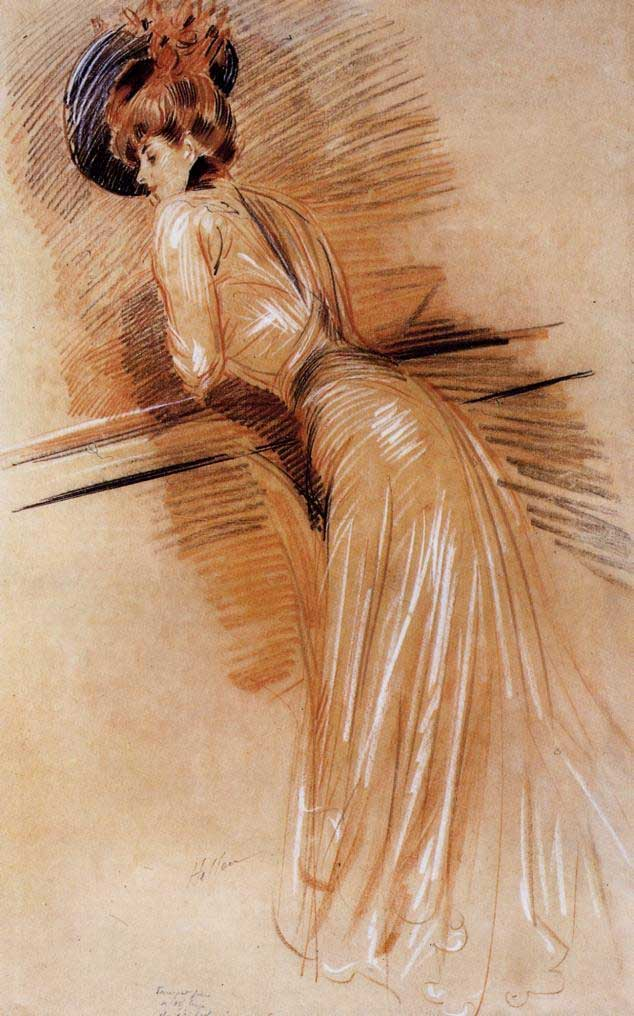
Elegant Woman at
the Rail, pastel, 1905

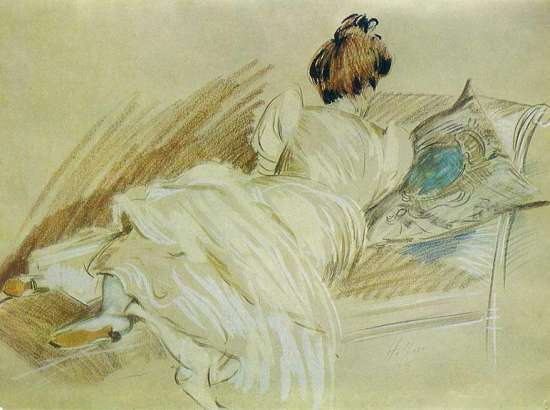
On the sofa,
pastel, 1899

== Prints ==
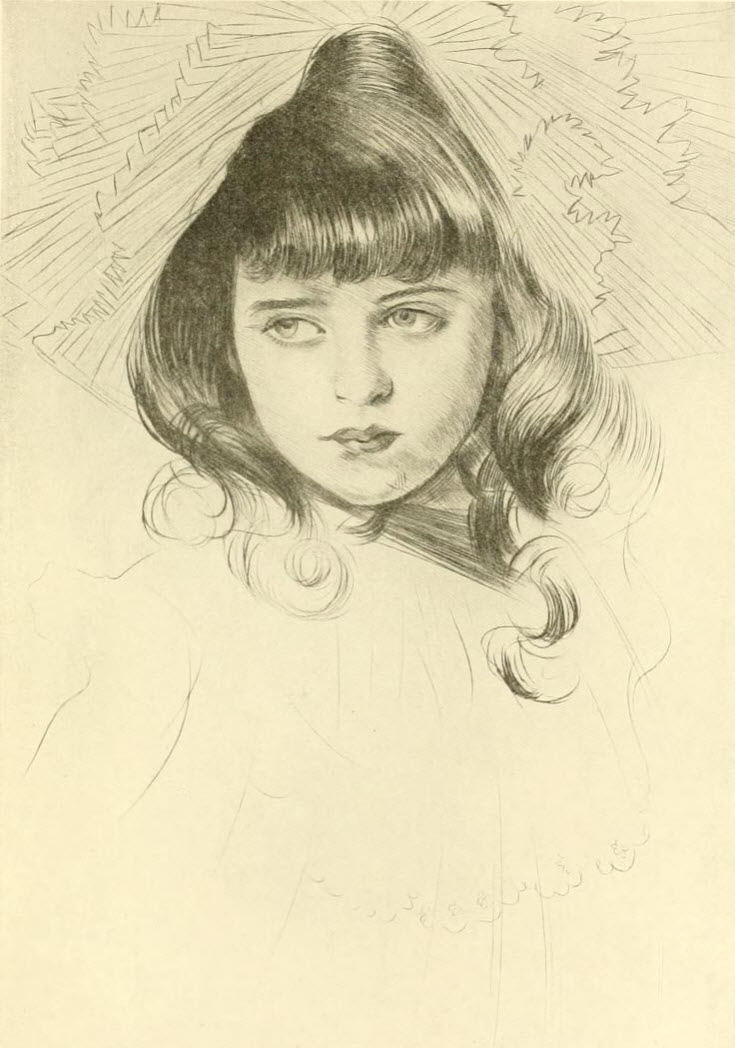
Le Chapeau Plissés,
drypoint

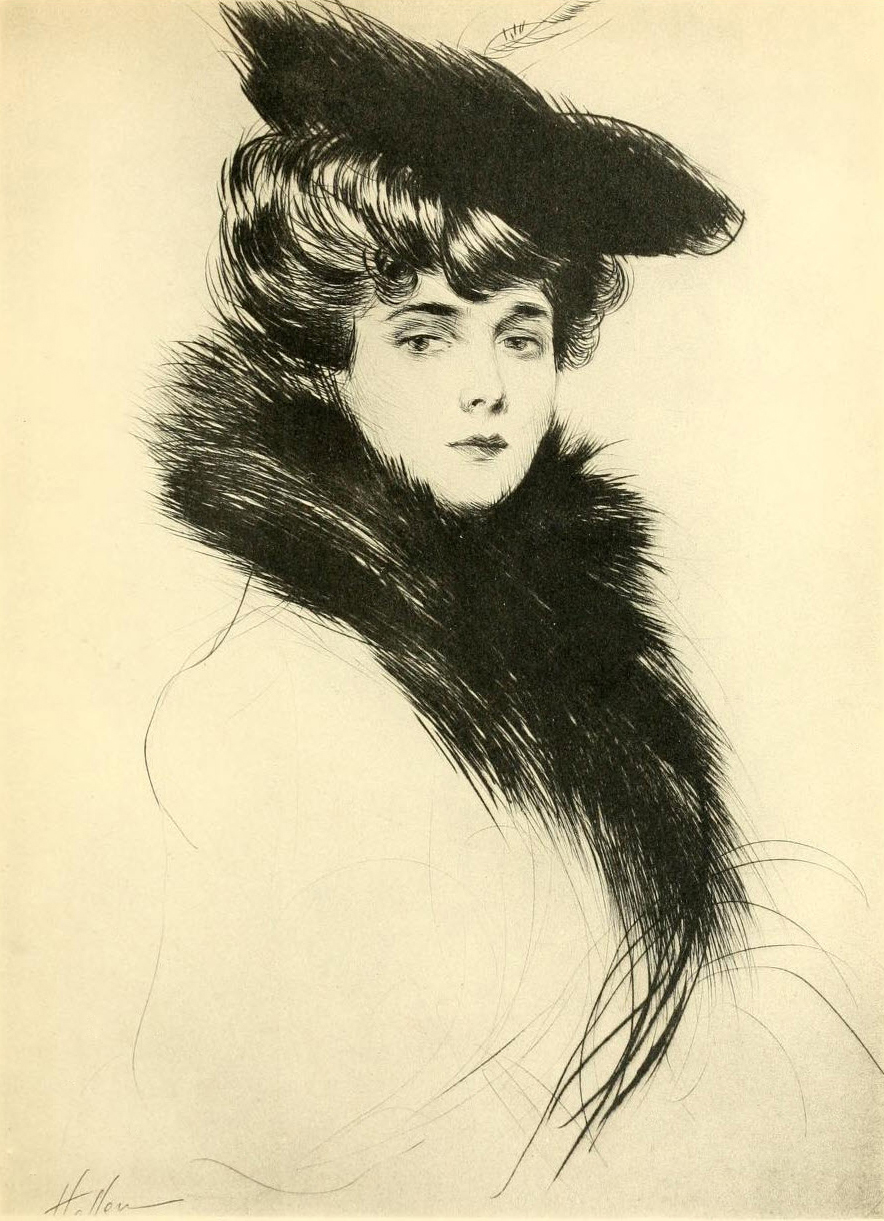
Madame Chéruit,
drypoint

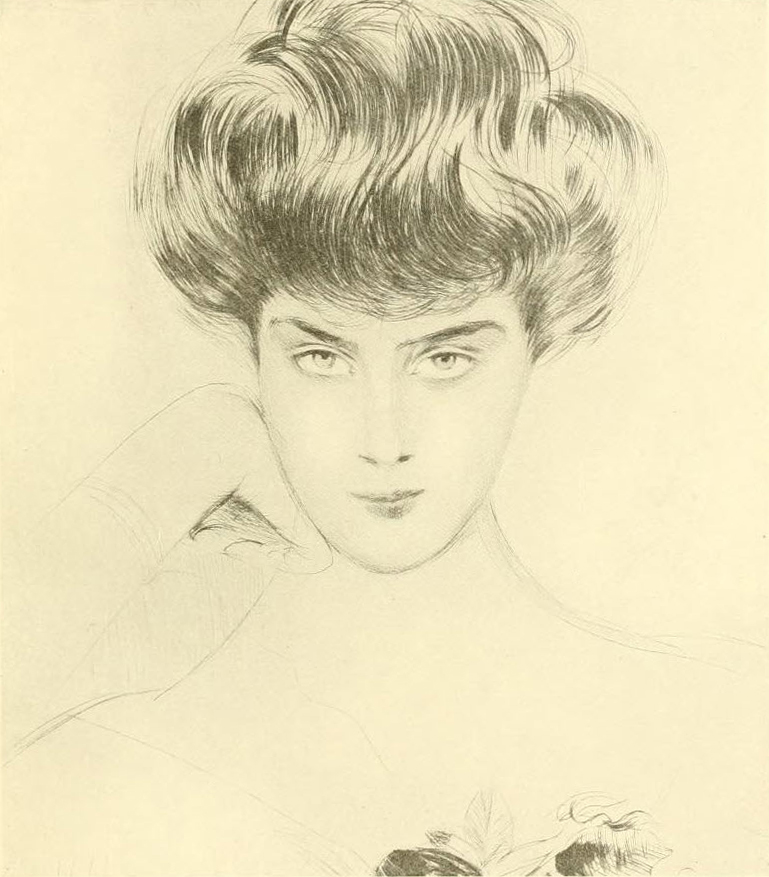
Le Sphinx,
drypoint

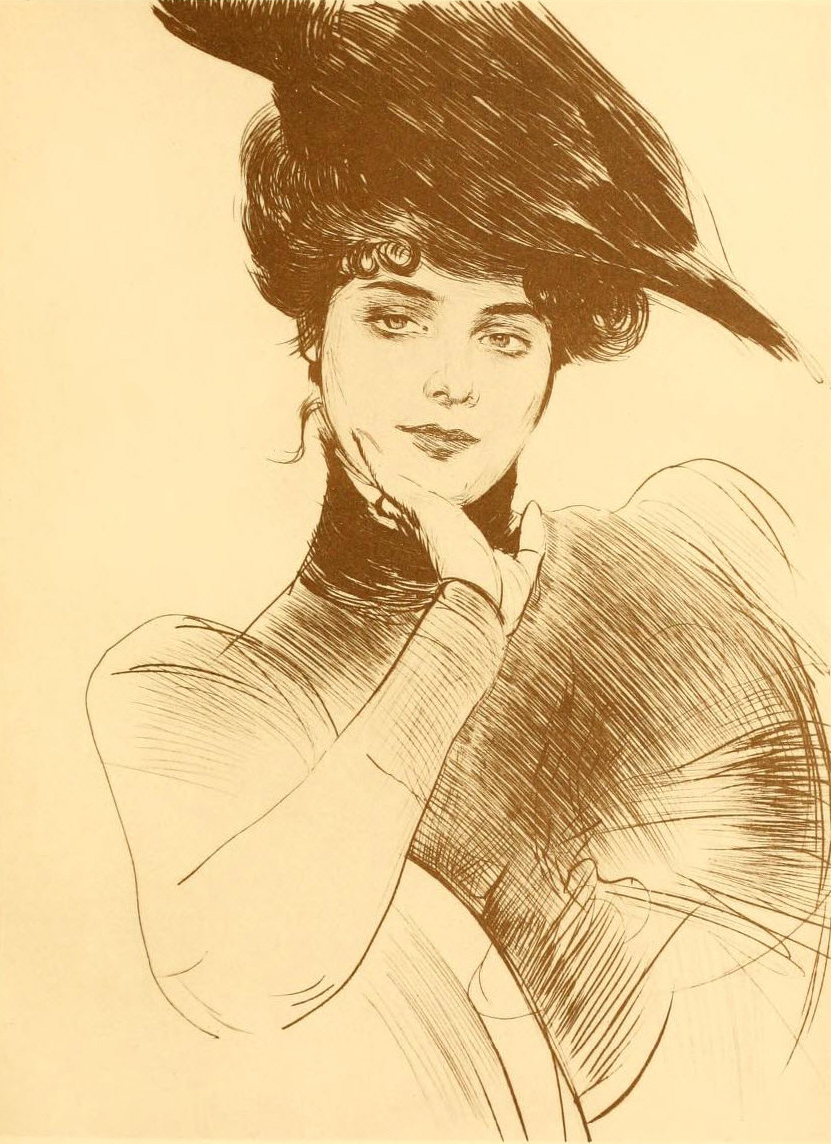
Étude d'après la même,
drypoint

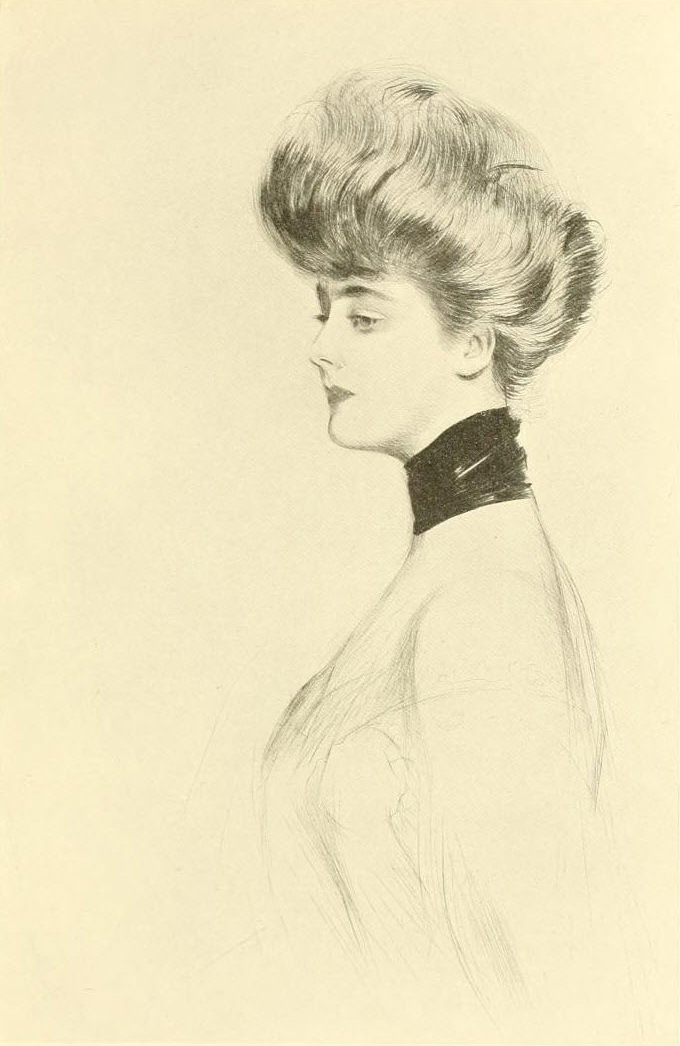
Madame Letellier,
drypoint

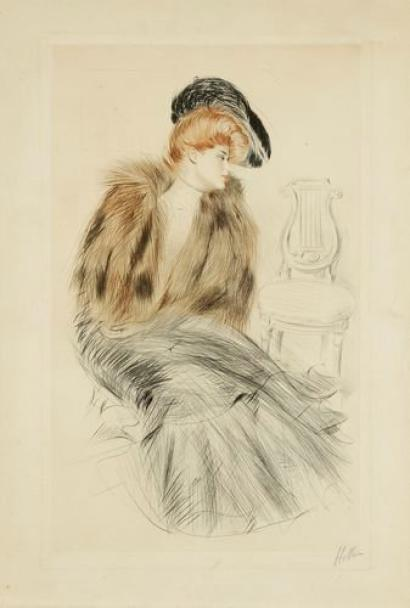
Elegant woman in fur coat. Drypoint, color print

== Oil paintings ==
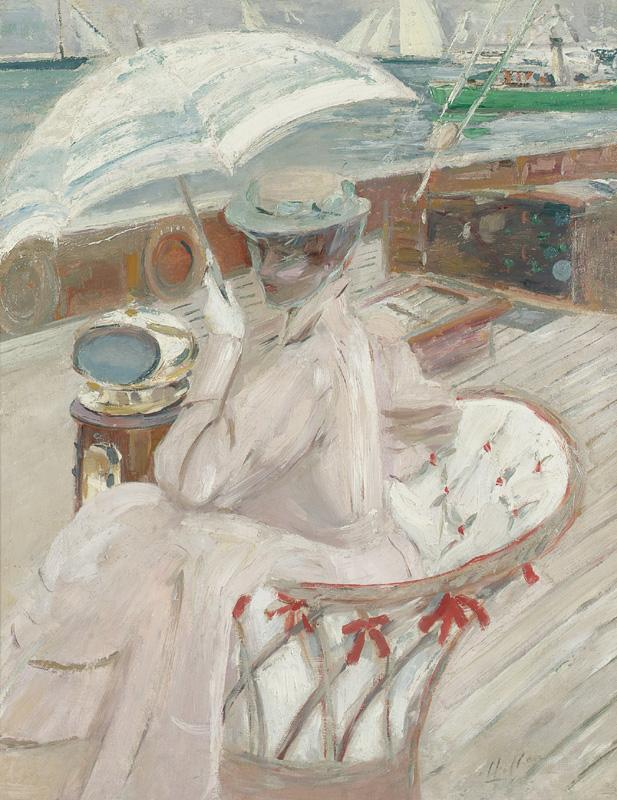
Madame Helleu on Her Yacht L'étoile, oil on canvas, ca. 1898–1900

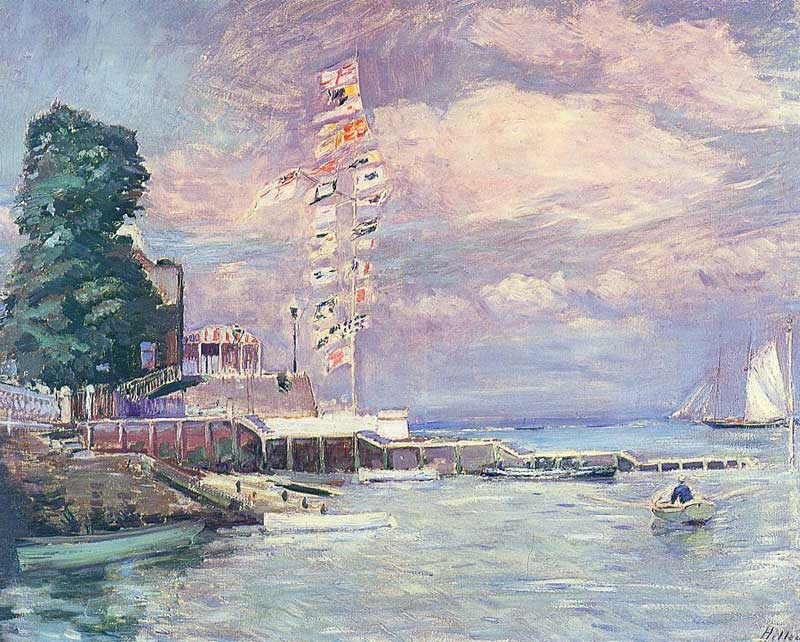
Le Grand Pavois,
oil on canvas, 1901

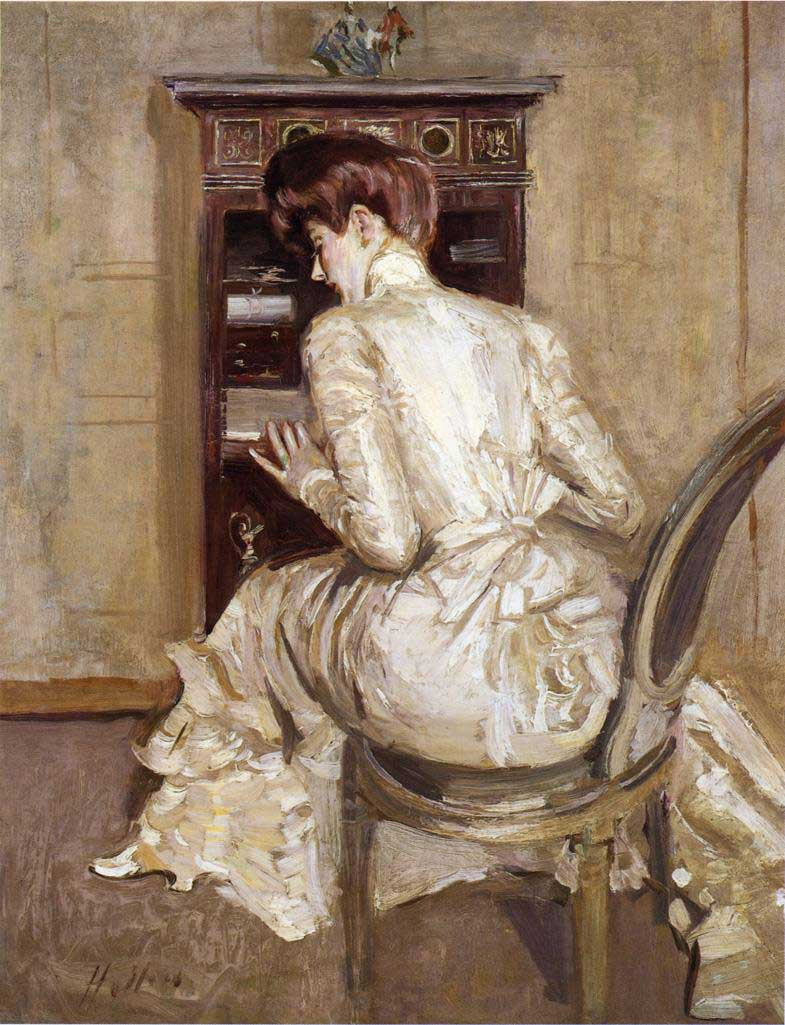
Madame Paul Helleu Seated at Her Secretaire, oil on canvas, 1900

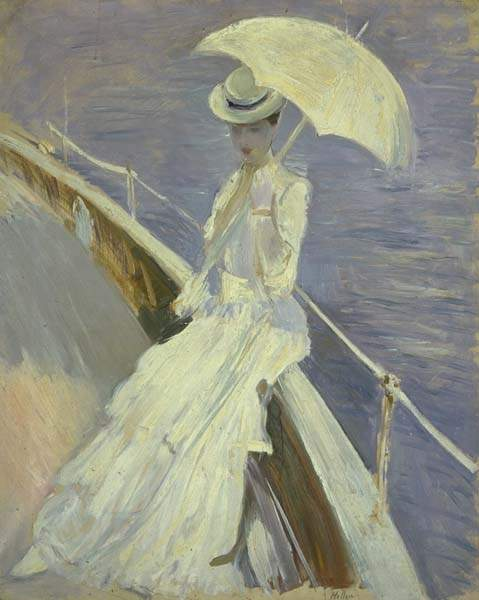
Young woman in white (Mrs. Helleu),
oil on canvas, 1900

== Miscellaneous subjects ==
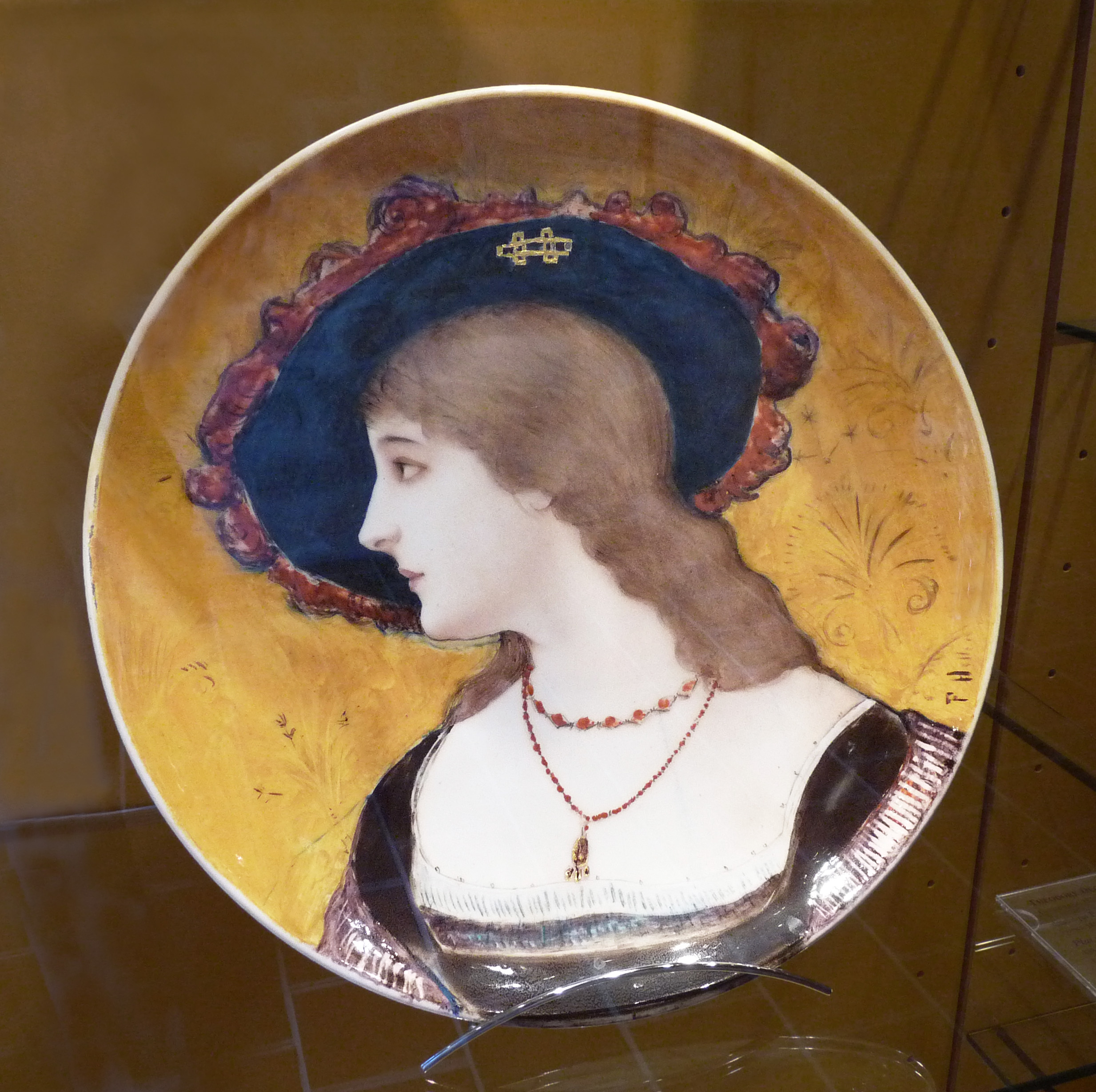
Théodore Deck plate decorated by Helleu, 1884, Colmar Museum

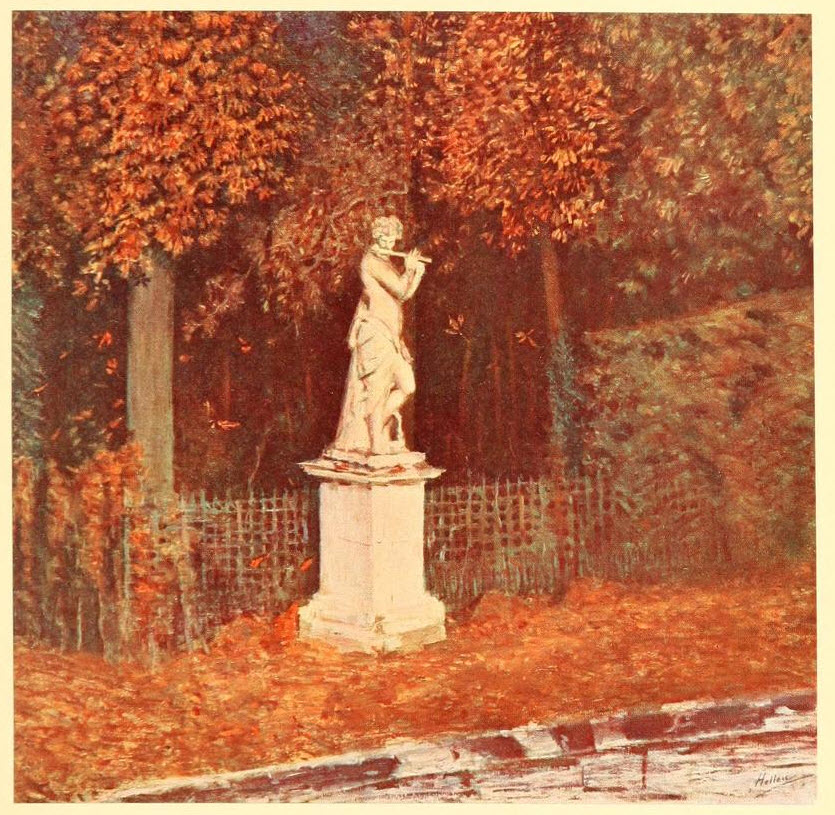
Le Joueur de flûte,
color print, 1895

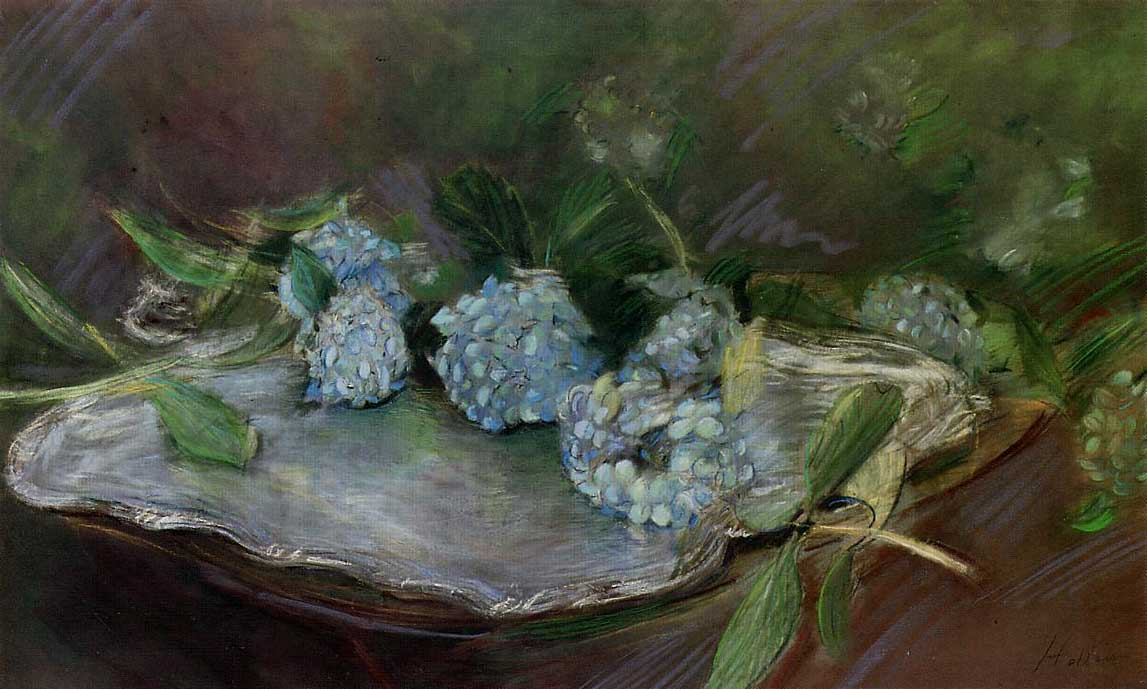
Hydrangeas,
pastel, 1911

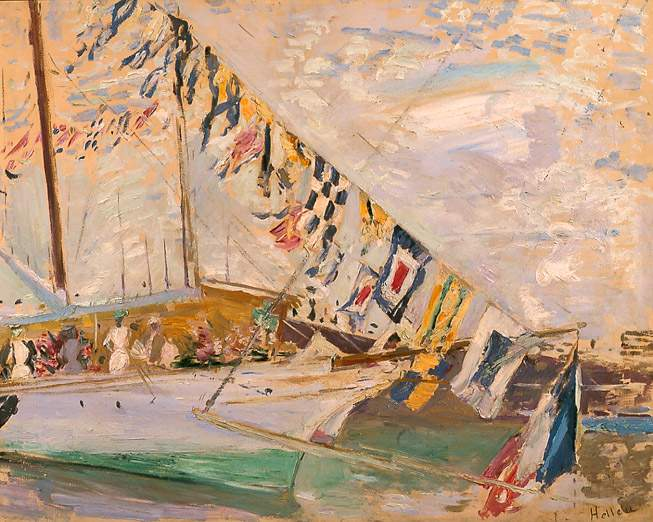
The Yacht L'étoile,
oil on canvas, 1903

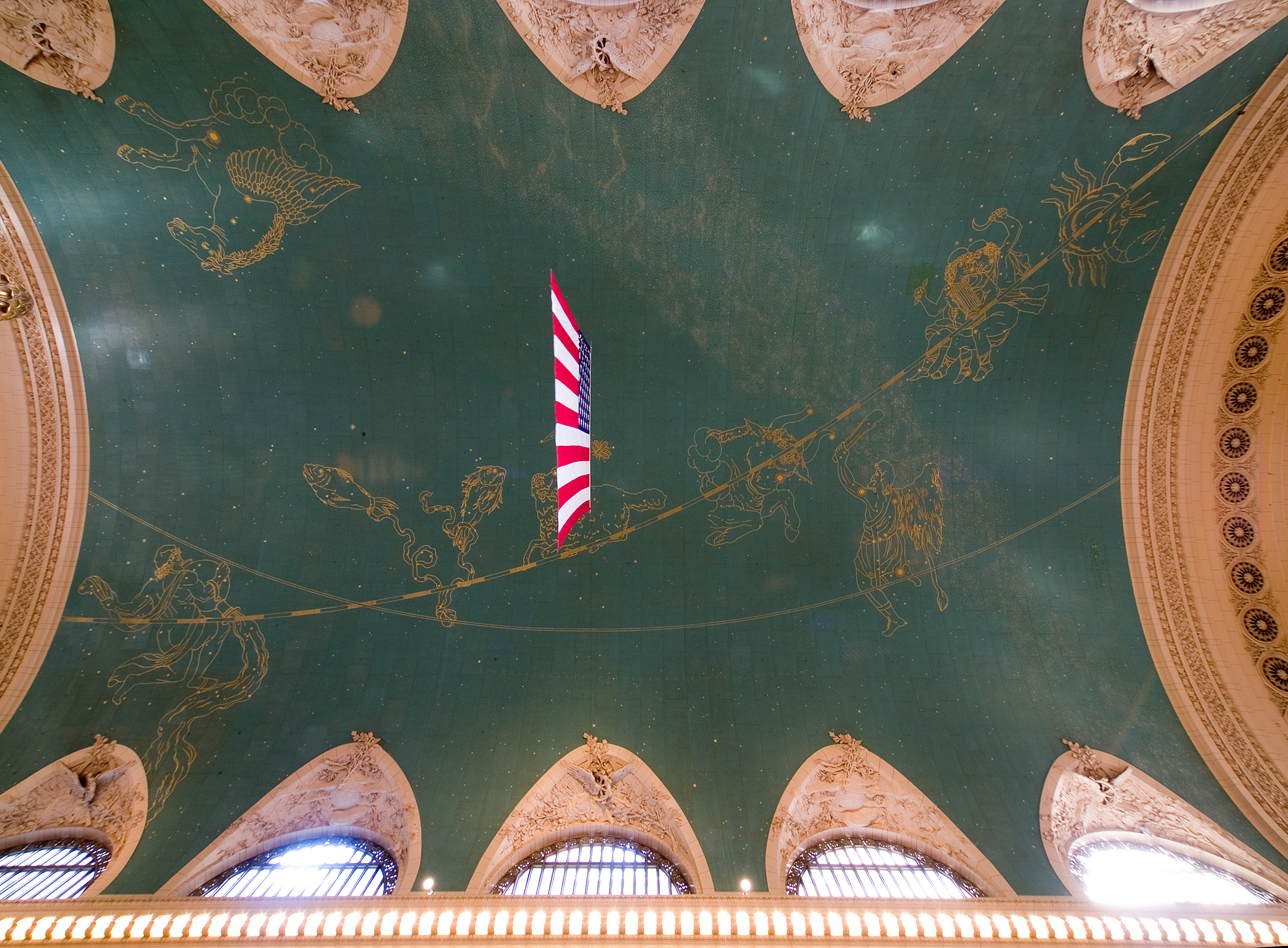
Grand Central Terminal ceiling in New York City

== Sources ==
- Montesquiou, Robert de (1913), Paul Helleu, Peintre et Graveur, Paris: H. Floury., digital facsimile edition, includes 100 full page illustrations in color, at Internet Archive (also at OpenLibrary.org)
- Mourey, Gabriel, "Paul Helleu" in Parisian Illustrated Review, volume 10, no. 1 (January 1901), pp. 11–17, translation of article first published in Revue Illustrée, at Google Books.
- Anguissola, Alberto Beretta (2006), Boldini, Helleu, Sem: protagonisti e miti della Belle Epoque, Milan: Skira.
- Wedmore, Frederick (1900?), Dry-points by Paul Helleu, New York: Frederick Keppel & Co.
- Green, Richard (1991), Helleu: Paul Cesar Helleu, 1859-1927 : An exhibition of oils, pastels and drypoints, London: Richard Green Gallery.
- Paul-César Helleu, 1859–1927: Glimpses of the Grace of Women (1974), New York: Knoedler.
- Paul Helleu: Drypoints (1992), London: Lumley Cazalet Ltd.
