= Jean-Pierre Masseret =

French politician

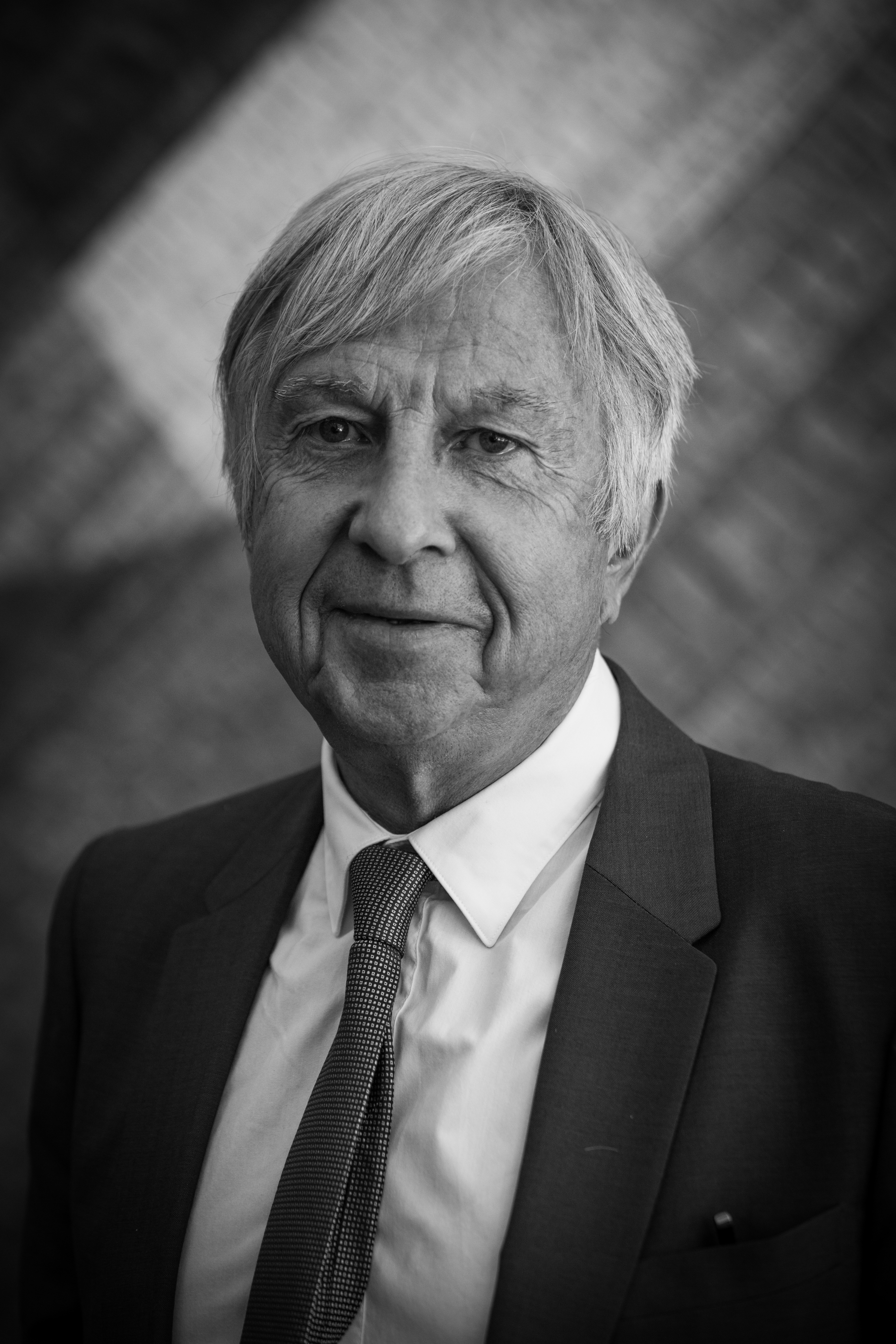
Jean-Pierre Masseret (2015)

Jean-Pierre Masseret (born 23 August 1944 in Cusset, Allier) was a member of the Senate of France, representing the Moselle department for the periods 1983 to 1997, 2001 to 2011, and 2014 to 2017. He was a member of the Socialist Party, until he changed to La République En Marche! in 2017. He is President of the Regional Council of Lorraine region since 2004, reelected in 2010, after being a member of the regional council since 1986. He was mayor of Talange from 1995 to 1997, and Secretary of State for Veterans affairs from 1997 to 2001, in Lionel Jospin's Government. He was also municipal councillor of Metz and general councillor of Moselle.
