= Volmunster =

- Commune
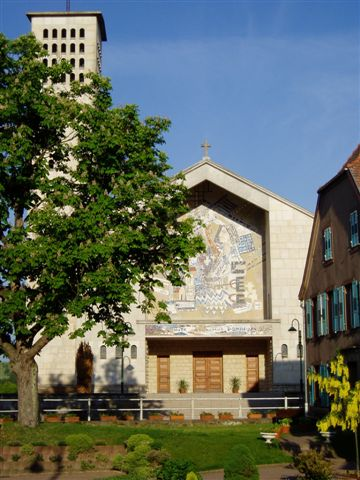
- The church in Volmunster

- Coat of arms
- Location of Volmunster
- Location within France Location within Grand Est
- Coordinates: 49°07′21″N 7°21′24″E
- Country: France
- Region: Grand Est
- Department: Moselle
- Arrondissement: Sarreguemines
- Canton: Bitche
- Intercommunality: Pays de Bitche

Government
  - Mayor (2020–2026): Jean Michel Heckel
- Area^{1}: 14.91 km^{2} (5.76 sq mi)
- Elevation: 250 m (820 ft)
- Highest elevation: 368 m (1,207 ft)
- Lowest elevation: 242 m (794 ft)
- Population (2023): 777
  - Density: 52.1/km^{2} (135/sq mi)
- Time zone: UTC+01:00 (CET)
  - Summer (DST): UTC+02:00 (CEST)
- INSEE/Postal code: 57732 /57720
- ^{1} French Land Register data, which excludes lakes, ponds, glaciers > 1 km^{2} (0.386 sq mi or 247 acres) and river estuaries.

Volmunster (French pronunciation: [vɔlmœ̃stɛʁ]; German: Wolmünster; Lorraine Franconian: Wolminschter) is a commune in the Moselle department of the Grand Est administrative region in north-eastern France.

The village belongs to the Pays de Bitche and to the Northern Vosges Regional Nature Park.

Localities of the commune: Eschviller, Weiskirch.

== Climate ==
Climate data for Volmunster (2001–2020 averages)
Month	Jan	Feb	Mar	Apr	May	Jun	Jul	Aug	Sep	Oct	Nov	Dec	Year
Record high °C (°F)	14.6 (58.3)	21.5 (70.7)	24.0 (75.2)	28.5 (83.3)	30.8 (87.4)	35.0 (95.0)	37.6 (99.7)	37.4 (99.3)	33.0 (91.4)	26.9 (80.4)	21.1 (70.0)	15.7 (60.3)	37.6 (99.7)
Mean daily maximum °C (°F)	3.8 (38.8)	5.5 (41.9)	10.0 (50.0)	15.2 (59.4)	18.7 (65.7)	22.9 (73.2)	24.8 (76.6)	24.0 (75.2)	19.7 (67.5)	14.5 (58.1)	8.4 (47.1)	4.6 (40.3)	14.3 (57.7)
Daily mean °C (°F)	1.4 (34.5)	2.5 (36.5)	5.9 (42.6)	10.0 (50.0)	13.6 (56.5)	17.4 (63.3)	19.3 (66.7)	18.7 (65.7)	14.8 (58.6)	10.7 (51.3)	5.8 (42.4)	2.4 (36.3)	10.2 (50.4)
Mean daily minimum °C (°F)	−0.9 (30.4)	−0.5 (31.1)	1.7 (35.1)	4.8 (40.6)	8.4 (47.1)	11.8 (53.2)	13.7 (56.7)	13.5 (56.3)	9.8 (49.6)	7.0 (44.6)	3.1 (37.6)	0.2 (32.4)	6.0 (42.8)
Record low °C (°F)	−15.5 (4.1)	−16.5 (2.3)	−15.5 (4.1)	−6.2 (20.8)	−1.5 (29.3)	2.7 (36.9)	5.8 (42.4)	4.0 (39.2)	1.5 (34.7)	−6.2 (20.8)	−6.4 (20.5)	−18.6 (−1.5)	−18.6 (−1.5)
Average precipitation mm (inches)	67.0 (2.64)	56.5 (2.22)	55.6 (2.19)	41.3 (1.63)	70.1 (2.76)	60.3 (2.37)	66.2 (2.61)	76.7 (3.02)	55.3 (2.18)	65.1 (2.56)	66.7 (2.63)	79.3 (3.12)	760.1 (29.93)
Average precipitation days (≥ 1.0 mm)	12.8	10.2	9.8	8.2	10.1	8.6	9.5	10.4	8.1	10.3	10.9	12.9	121.8
Mean monthly sunshine hours	49.8	76.9	160.1	205.4	217.7	240.5	245.9	212.3	172.6	105.3	52.0	39.6	1,777.8
Source: Meteociel

== See also ==
- Communes of the Moselle department
