= Departmental Council of Vosges =

Departmental Legislature in France

Coordinates: 48°10′20″N 6°26′57″E

Departmental Council of Vosges Conseil départemental des Vosges
- Logo of the Council

Leadership
- President: François Vannson, LR

Meeting place
- 8, rue de la Prefecture, 88088 Épinal

Website
- vosges.fr

The Departmental Council of Vosges (French: Conseil départemental des Vosges, Alsatian: Départementrõt vum Vosges) is the deliberative assembly of the Vosges department in the region of Grand Est. It consists of 34 members (departmental councilors) from 17 cantons and its headquarters are in Épinal.

The President of the Departmental Council is François Vannson.

== Vice-Presidents ==
The President of the Departmental Council is assisted by 10 vice-presidents chosen from among the departmental councillors. Each of them has a delegation of authority.

List of vice-presidents of the Vosges Departmental Council (as of 2021)
Order	Name	Canton	Delegation
1st	Caroline Privat-Mattioni	Saint-Dié-des-Vosges-2	Youth, culture, colleges and sports
2nd	Simon Leclerc	Neufchâteau	Communities and associations
3rd	Nathalie Babouhot	Mirecourt	Administration, finance and SDIS
4th	Franck Perry	Vittel	Economy, tourism, agriculture and forestry
5th	Ghislaine Jeandel-Jeanpierre	Épinal-1	Children, families and autonomy
6th	Benoît Jourdain	Épinal-2	Environment and housing
7th	Véronique Marcot	Le Val-d'Ajol	Roads and heritage
8th	Jérôme Mathieu	La Bresse	Communication and digital uses
9th	Carole Thiébaut-Gaudé	Darney	Social and territorial action and integration
10th	William Mathis	Saint-Dié-des-Vosges-1	Mobility

== See also ==
- Vosges
- Departmental council (France)
