= Sarreguemines =

Sarreguemines Saargemìnn (Lorraine Franconian)
- Subprefecture and commune
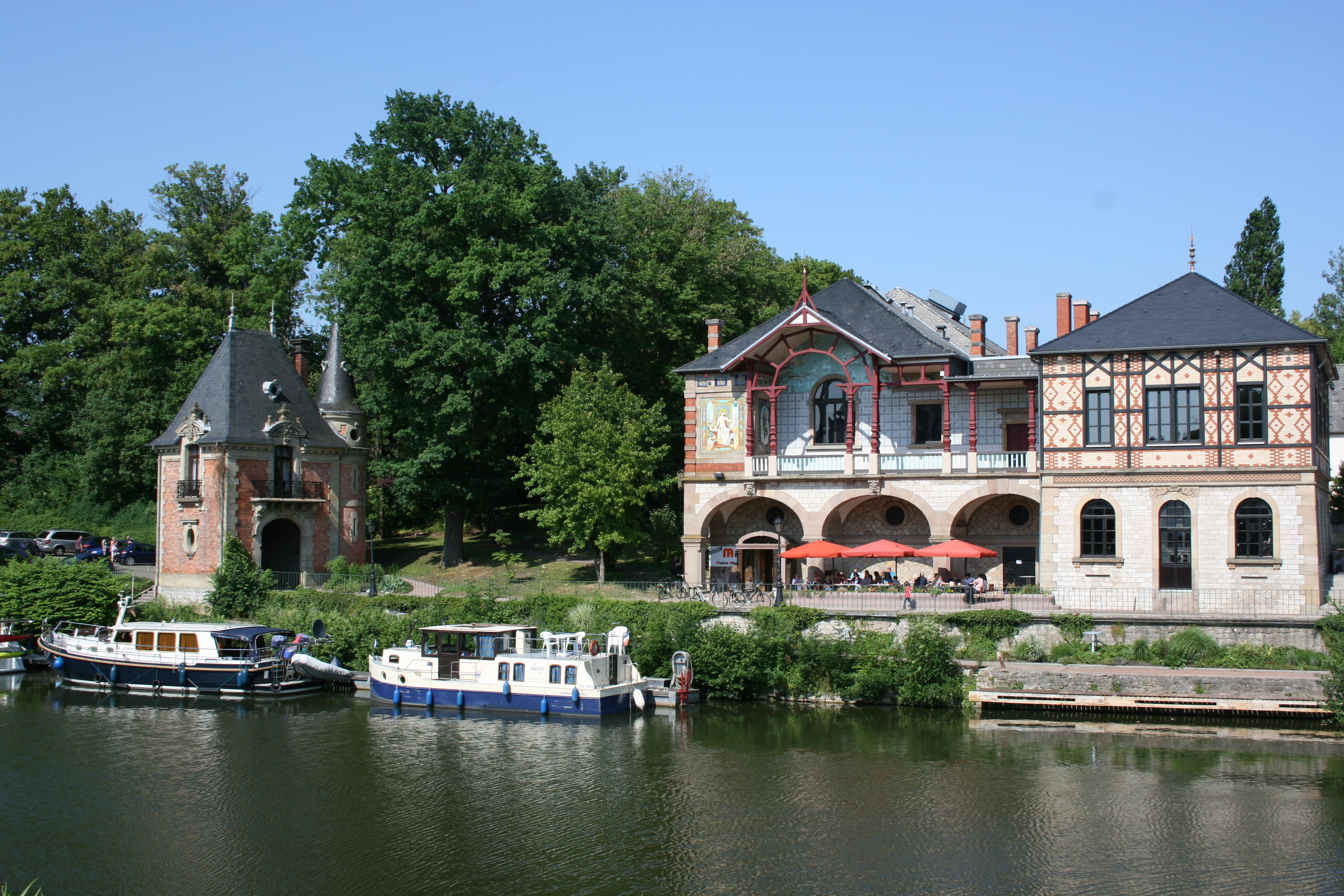
- View of the Saar River and the casino

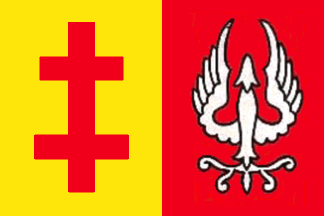
- Flag Coat of arms
- Location of Sarreguemines
- Location within France Location within Grand Est
- Coordinates: 49°07′N 7°04′E
- Country: France
- Region: Grand Est
- Department: Moselle
- Arrondissement: Sarreguemines
- Canton: Sarreguemines
- Intercommunality: CA Sarreguemines Confluences

Government
  - Mayor (2026–32): Marc Zingraff (DVD)
- Area^{1}: 29.67 km^{2} (11.46 sq mi)
- Highest elevation: 293 m (961 ft)
- Lowest elevation: 192 m (630 ft)
- Population (2023): 20,143
  - Density: 678.9/km^{2} (1,758/sq mi)
- Time zone: UTC+01:00 (CET)
  - Summer (DST): UTC+02:00 (CEST)
- INSEE/Postal code: 57631 /57200
- Website: sarreguemines.fr
- ^{1} French Land Register data, which excludes lakes, ponds, glaciers > 1 km^{2} (0.386 sq mi or 247 acres) and river estuaries.

Sarreguemines (French pronunciation: [saʁɡəmin]; German: Saargemünd [zaːɐ̯ɡəˈmʏnt]; Lorraine Franconian: Saargemìnn [zaː.gəˈmɪn]) is a commune in the Moselle department of the Grand Est administrative region in north-eastern France.

It is the seat of an arrondissement and a canton. The inhabitants of the commune are known as Sarregueminois and Sarregueminoises in French.

== Geography ==
Sarreguemines, whose name is a French spelling of the name in local Lorraine-German dialect Saargemin, meaning "confluence into the Saar", is located at the confluence of the Blies and the Saar, 79 kilometres (49 mi) east of Metz, 107 kilometres (66 mi) northwest of Strasbourg by rail, and at the junction of the lines to Trier and Sarrebourg. Sarreguemines station has rail connections to Strasbourg, Saarbrücken and Metz. Traditionally Sarreguemines was the head of river navigation on the Saar, its importance being a depot where boats were unloaded.

== Population ==
Historical population

Year	Pop.	±% p.a.
1793	2,402	—
1800	2,529	+0.74%
1806	2,972	+2.73%
1821	3,608	+1.30%
1836	4,113	+0.88%
1841	4,243	+0.62%
1861	6,075	+1.81%
1866	6,802	+2.29%
1871	6,863	+0.18%
1875	8,466	+5.39%
1880	9,573	+2.49%
1885	10,719	+2.29%
1890	13,076	+4.06%
1895	13,888	+1.21%
1900	14,685	+1.12%
1905	14,919	+0.32%
1910	14,253	−0.91%

Year	Pop.	±% p.a.
1921	14,197	−0.04%
1926	13,812	−0.55%
1931	14,371	+0.80%
1936	16,001	+2.17%
1946	13,375	−1.78%
1954	14,947	+1.40%
1962	17,866	+2.25%
1968	24,284	+5.25%
1975	25,684	+0.80%
1982	24,763	−0.52%
1990	23,117	−0.86%
1999	23,202	+0.04%
2007	21,835	−0.76%
2012	21,605	−0.21%
2017	20,783	−0.77%
2023	20,143	−0.52%

Source: EHESS and INSEE (1968–2023)

== Administration ==
Sarreguemines was, from 1985 to 2015, the seat of two cantons:

- Sarreguemines, consisting of the Sarreguemines commune only.
- Sarreguemines-Campagne, comprising 21 nearby communes.

Both cantons, minus the communes of Grundviller, Guebenhouse, Loupershouse and Woustviller that were added to the canton of Sarralbe, were merged into one canton of Sarreguemines on 1 January 2015.

== History ==
Sarreguemines, originally a Roman settlement, obtained civic rights early in the 13th century. In 1297 it was ceded by the count of Saarbrücken to the Duke of Lorraine, and passed with Lorraine in 1766 to France. French Influence: The fortunes of Sarreguemines took another turn in 1766 when it passed from Lorraine to France. This period saw the town further develop its industries, including the production of plush velvet, leather, faience, porcelain, and papier-mâché boxes, primarily utilized for snuffboxes. Sarreguemines became renowned for its artisanal craftsmanship and artistic traditions.

It was transferred to Germany in 1871, with the Treaty of Frankfurt following the Franco-Prussian War. From 1871 to 1918 it formed part of the German imperial province of Alsace-Lorraine and manufactured plush velvet, leather, faience and porcelain, and was a centre for making papier-mâché boxes, mostly used for snuffboxes. It was returned to France after World War I.

On 21–23 December 1944, the 44th Infantry Division (United States) threw back three attempts by the Germans to cross the Blies River. An aggressive defense of the Sarreguemines area was continued throughout February and most of March 1945.

== Notable people ==
Sarreguemines was the birthplace of:

- Jean-Pierre Bachasson, comte de Montalivet (1766–1823), Peer of France and a French statesman
- Auguste Hilarion Touret (1797–1858) – French philhellene officer and a participant in the War of Independence of Greece
- Maximilian von Jaunez (1873–1947), industrialist and politician
- Hans Traut (1895–1974), general
- Marianne Oswald (1901–1985), singer
- Karl Ullrich (1910–1996), Knight's Cross holder
- Eugen-Ludwig Zweigart (1914–1944), pilot
- Céleste Lett (born 1951), politician
- Michel Roth (born 1959), chef
- Eric Hassli (born 1981), French footballer
- Lucien Schmitthäusler (1935–2020), writer and educator
- Matthieu Sprick (born 1981), French cyclist
- Erza Muqoli (born 2005), French singer
- Aurélie Muller (born 1990), French swimmer

== See also ==
- Communes of the Moselle department
