= Lorraine =

Cultural and historical region in France

Coordinates: 49°00′N 6°00′E

Lorraine Louréne (Lorrain) Lottringe (Lorraine Franconian) Lothringen (German) Loutrengen (Luxembourgish)
- Flag Coat of arms

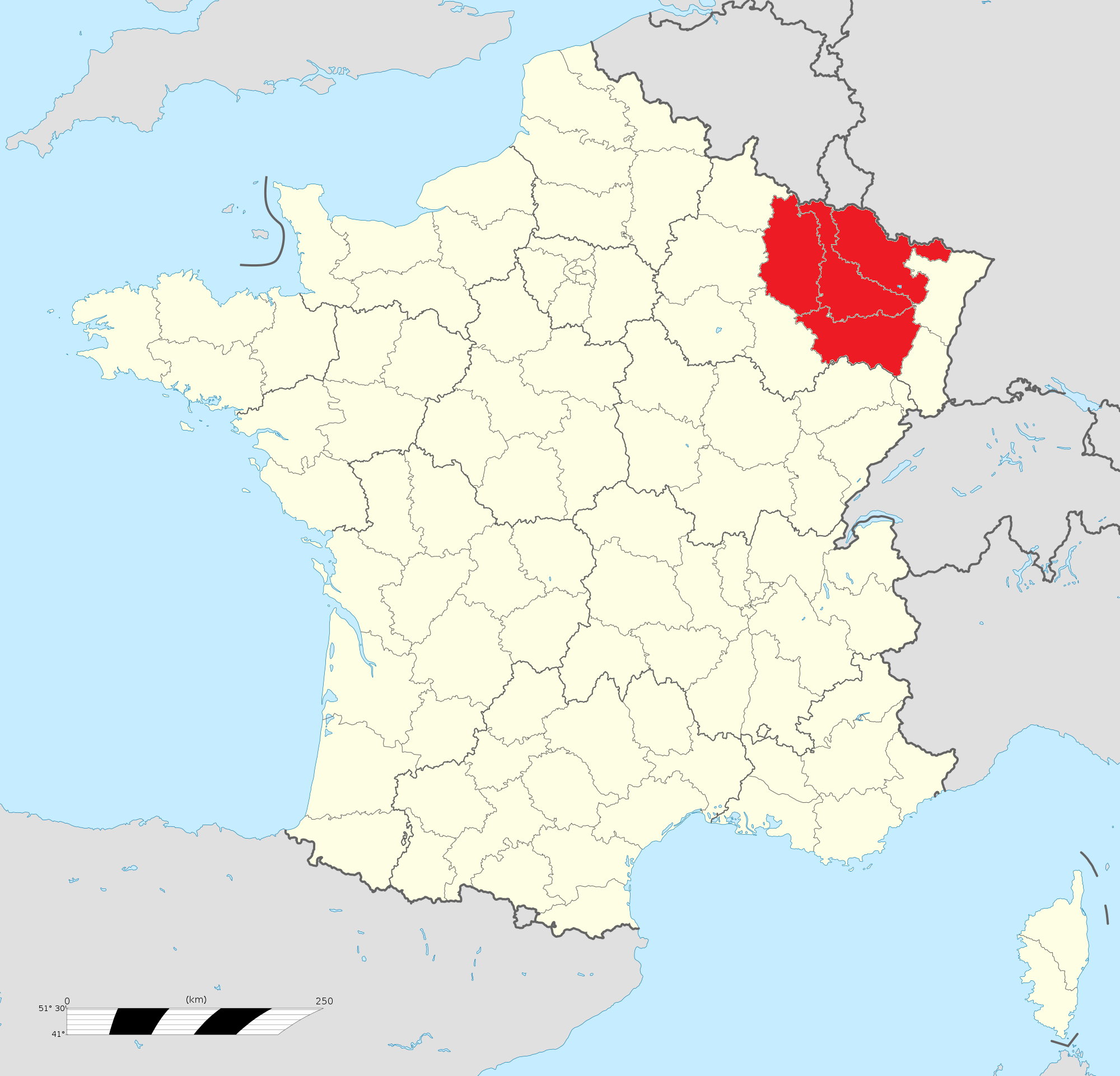
- Country: France
- Administrative region: Grand Est
- Prefecture: Metz
- Departments: 4: Meurthe-et-Moselle (54); Meuse (55); Moselle (57); Vosges (88)

Area
  - Total: 23,547 km^{2} (9,092 sq mi)

Population (1 January 2012)
  - Total: 2,349,816
- Demonym(s): Lorrainer, Lorrainian

GDP
  - Total: €72.857 billion (2024)
  - Per capita: €31,513 (2024)
- ISO 3166 code: FR-M
- NUTS Region: FR4

Lorraine (Note: /ləˈreɪn/, also UK: /lɒˈ-/, US: /lɔːˈ-, loʊˈ-/; French: [lɔʁɛn]; Lorrain: Louréne; Lorraine Franconian: Lottringe; German: Lothringen [ˈloːtʁɪŋən]; Luxembourgish: Loutrengen) is a historical area of Eastern France that today falls within the administrative region of Grand Est. It has its origins in the medieval kingdom of Lotharingia (855–959 AD), named after Emperor Lothair I or King Lothair II, which came to be ruled by the Holy Roman Empire. This kingdom, which extended further north than the modern region, was divided into upper and lower duchies; the lower duchy lasted until the 12th century but the upper duchy persisted and developed into the Duchy of Lorraine. The Kingdom of France annexed the duchy, along with the Duchy of Bar (the two having been held together since the 15th century), in 1766, which became the Lorraine and Barrois province.

From 1982 until January 2016, Lorraine was an administrative region of France. In 2016, under a reorganisation, it became part of the new region Grand Est. As a region in modern France, Lorraine consisted of the four departments Meurthe-et-Moselle, Meuse, Moselle and Vosges (from a historical point of view the Haute-Marne department is also located in the region), containing 2,337 communes. Metz is the regional prefecture. The largest metropolitan area of Lorraine is Nancy, which was the seat of the duchy for centuries.

To the north, Lorraine borders Germany, Belgium, and Luxembourg. In French, its male inhabitants are called Lorrains and its female inhabitants are called Lorraines. The population of Lorraine is about 2,356,000.

== History ==
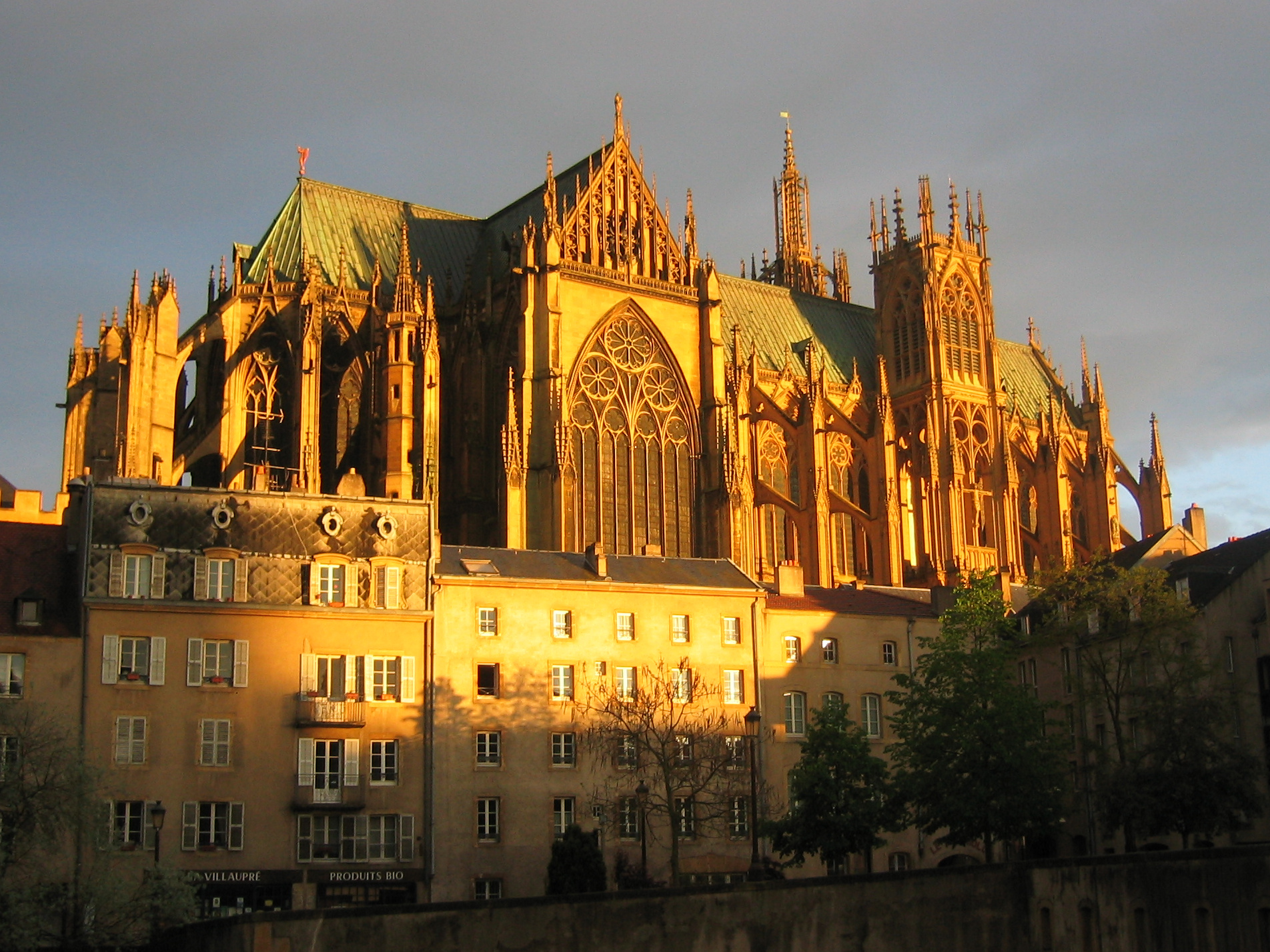
Cathedral of Saint Stephen in Metz, capital of Lorraine

Lorraine's borders have changed often in its long history. The location of Lorraine led to it being a paramount strategic asset at the crossroads of four nations. This, along with its political alliances, marriage alliances, and the ability of rulers over the centuries to choose sides between East and West, gave it a powerful and important role in European history. Its rulers intermarried with royal families over all of Europe, played kingmaker, and seated rulers on the thrones of the Holy Roman Empire and the Austro-Hungarian Empire, and others.

In 840, Charlemagne's son Louis the Pious died. The Carolingian Empire was divided among Louis' three sons by the Treaty of Verdun of 843. The middle realm, known as Middle Francia, went to Lothair I, reaching from Frisia in Northern Germany through the Low Countries, Eastern France, Burgundy, Provence, Northern Italy, and down to Rome. On the death of Lothair I, Middle Francia was divided in three by the Treaty of Prüm in 855, with the northern third called Lotharingia and going to Lothair II. Due to Lotharingia being sandwiched between East and West Francia, the rulers identified as a duchy from 903 onward, enabling the duchy to ally and align itself nominally with either eastern or western Carolingian kingdoms in order to survive and maintain its independence. Thus, it was a duchy in name but operated as an independent kingdom.

In 870, Lorraine allied with East Francia while remaining an autonomous duchy. In 959 the duchy was divided into the duchies of Upper and Lower Lorraine (or Upper and Lower Lotharingia); the lower duchy encompassed much of the southern Low Countries and the northern Rhineland, while the upper duchy broadly covered the modern region of Lorraine. In 962 Otto, the king of East Francia, restored the Empire (restauratio imperii), forming the Holy Roman Empire. By the end of the 12th century the lower duchy had become defunct, leaving the upper duchy to become known as simply Lorraine. Over the centuries feudal fragmentation led to various parts of the duchy splitting off (i.e. to become imperially immediate), including the County of Bar and the prince-bishoprics of Metz, Verdun and Toul. From 1301 Bar straddled the French-Imperial border, with the French part known as Barrois mouvant and the imperial part as Barrois non mouvant; it became a duchy in 1354. In 1480 Lorraine and Bar were joined in a personal union, which became permanent in 1506. From that point the two essentially became a single entity, often collectively referred to simply as Lorraine.

Following the Imperial Reform of 1500, Lorraine and the imperial part of Bar were assigned to the Upper Rhenish Circle, one of the imperial circles of the Holy Roman Empire, which were established to facilitate the Empire's administration, collective defence, and taxation.

In 1552 Metz, Verdun and Toul were annexed by France, becoming the Three Bishoprics province; this annexation was not recognized by the Empire until the 1648 Peace of Westphalia.

In 1738, by the Treaty of Vienna, Lorraine and Bar passed from the house of Lorraine to Stanisław Leszczyński and in 1766 were annexed under succession law by the Kingdom of France, becoming the Lorraine and Barrois province. The succession within these houses, in tandem with other historical events, would have later restored Lorraine's status as its own duchy, but a vacuum in leadership occurred. Its duke Francois Stephen de Lorraine took the throne of the Holy Roman Empire as Francis I, and his brother Prince Charles Alexander of Lorraine became governor of the Austrian Netherlands. For political reasons, he decided to hide those heirs who were not born by his first wife, Archduchess Maria Anna of Austria, who was deceased when he took office. The vacuum in leadership, the French Revolution, and the political results and changes issuing from the many nationalistic wars that followed in the next 130 years, ultimately resulted in Lorraine becoming a permanent part of the modern Republic of France. Because of wars, it came under control of Germany several times as the border between the nations shifted. While Lorrainian separatists do exist in the 21st century, their political power and influence is negligible. Lorraine separatism today consists more of preserving its cultural identity rather than seeking genuine political independence.

With enlightened leadership and at a crossroads between French and German cultures, Lotharingia experienced tremendous economic, artistic, and cultural prosperity during the 12th and 13th centuries under the Hohenstaufen emperors. Along with the rest of Europe, this prosperity was terminated in Lorraine in the 14th century by a series of harsh winters, bad harvests, and the Black Death. During the Renaissance, a flourishing prosperity returned to Lotharingia until the Thirty Years' War.

The region's location has caused the population to be mixed. The north largely spoke German, Lorraine Franconian and other German dialects. A strong centralised nationalism had only just begun to replace the feudalist system which had formed the multilingual borders, and an insurrection against the French occupation influenced much of the area's early identity. In 1871, the German Empire regained a part of Lorraine (Bezirk Lothringen, corresponding to the current department of Moselle). The department formed part of the new German Empire's Imperial Territory of Alsace–Lorraine. In the French Third Republic, the revanchist movement developed to recover this territory.

The Imperial German administration strongly discouraged the French language and culture in favor of High German, which became the administrative language (Geschäftssprache). It required the use of German in schools in areas which it considered or designated as German-speaking, an often arbitrary categorisation. French was allowed to remain in use only in primary and secondary schools in municipalities definitely considered Francophone, such as Château-Salins and the surrounding arrondissements, as well and in their local administration.

After 1877, higher education, including state-run colleges, universities and teacher seminaries, was conducted exclusively in German. The predominance of German and the partial usage of French, though restricted, were both guaranteed by the 1911 constitution of Alsace-Lorraine. While many toponyms of German etymology in Lorraine were adapted to the High German standard (i.e. Germanised) a number of genuine Francophone toponyms remained untouched. During the Nazi occupation between 1940 and 1944, however, its government imposed German translations to replace French names. For instance, Château-Salins was called Salzburg in Lothringen.

During the Battle of the Frontiers at the beginning of World War I, the French First Army invaded Lorraine and briefly occupied Mulhouse. However, the German Sixth Army under Crown Prince Rupprecht of Bavaria counterattacked and forced the French forces into retreat at the Battles of Sarrebourg and Morhange. Lorraine remained under martial law, close to the Western Front in northeastern France, and suffering from refugee crises for the rest of the war. The population effectively revolted against German rule by participating in the German Revolution of 1918–1919, with the Alsace-Lorraine Soviet Republic being founded, but eventually welcomed French troops two weeks after.

In the 1919 Treaty of Versailles following World War I, the Weimar Republic suffered severe territorial losses, including the portion of Lorraine territory that had been part of its state of Alsace-Lorraine. With the exception of its de facto annexation by Nazi Germany as part of the Gau Westmark (Civil Administration Area of Lorraine) during World War II, that area has since remained a part of France. During that war, the Cross of Lorraine was a symbol of Free France.

Duchy of Lorraine Duchy of Bar The Three Bishoprics (Metz, Verdun, Toul) Champagne and Clermontois District of Montmédy, part of French Luxembourg Duchy of Carignan Principality of Salm County of Dabo Alsace Franche-Comté County of Kriechingen (today Créhange)

== Development of the borders in modern history ==
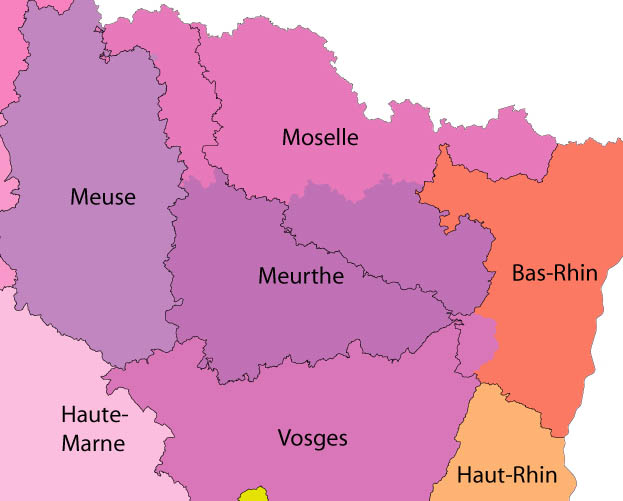
Lorraine in 1870: Colours show the original departments' territories.

The administrative region of Lorraine is larger than the 18th century Duchy of Lorraine, which gradually came under French sovereignty between 1737 and 1766. The modern region includes provinces and areas that were historically separate from the duchy of Lorraine proper. These are:

- Barrois
- Three Bishoprics: non-contiguous territories around Metz, Verdun, and Toul, which were detached from the Holy Roman Empire in the 16th century and came under French sovereignty. Some southern parts of the Duchy of Luxembourg (French Luxemburg) were also annexed by France in the 1659 Treaty of the Pyrenees and incorporated into the Three Bishoprics.
- Several small principalities, which were still part of the Holy Roman Empire at the time of the French Revolution.

Some historians consider the traditional province of Lorraine as limited to the duchy of Lorraine proper, while others consider that it includes Barrois and the Three Bishoprics. The Duchy of Lorraine (originally the Duchy of Upper Lorraine) did not include the entire area since called Lorraine.

The case of Barrois is the most complicated: the part of the County of Bar (Barrois) west of the Meuse, known as Barrois mouvant, passed from imperial to French sovereignty, while the largest part of Barrois (east of the Meuse River) remained part of the Holy Roman Empire; both parts remained under the same count, legally as fiefs of France and the Empire. In 1354 Bar's count became a Duke and a peer in France, although the ducal title was not recognised in the empire until the 16th century. In the 15th century, Bar was united with the Duchy of Lorraine by the marriage of the Duke of Bar, René of Anjou, with Isabella, daughter of the Duke of Lorraine. Thus the duchies of Bar and Lorraine were united in personal union under the same duke; however, they were officially separate until being annexed and incorporated into the Kingdom of France in 1766. Upon incorporation they became the Lorraine and Barrois general government (province); the Parlement of Nancy (until 1776 the Sovereign Court of Lorraine and Barrois) covered the bulk of this new province, but Barrois mouvant, having been part of France for centuries, fell under the Parlement of Paris.

During the French Revolution, four departments were created from the main parts of the territories of Barrois, Three Bishoprics and the Duchy of Lorraine:

- Meuse
- Meurthe
- Moselle
- Vosges

After 1870 some parts of Moselle and Meurthe became part of Germany. Of the remaining parts, France formed the new department named Meurthe-et-Moselle. After 1918 and the Great War, France regained control of Moselle.

When France created its administrative regions in the middle of the 20th century, it decided to gather Meurthe et Moselle, Meuse, Moselle and Vosges into a single region, known as Lorraine.

== Geography ==
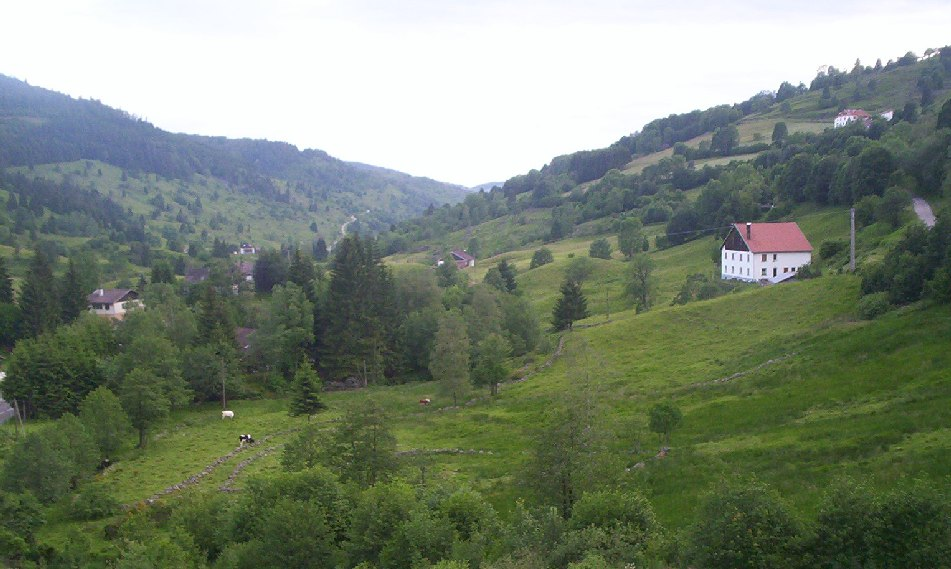
Chajoux Valley

Lorraine is the only French region to have borders with three other countries: Belgium (Wallonia), Luxembourg, and Germany (Saarland, Rhineland-Palatinate). It also borders the French regions of Franche-Comté, Champagne-Ardenne, which were at times part of historical Lorraine (Lotharingia), and Alsace.

Most of the region forms part of the Paris Basin, with a plateau relief cut by river valleys presenting cuestas in the north–south direction. The eastern part is sharper with the Vosges. Many rivers run through Lorraine, including Moselle, Meurthe, and Meuse. Most of them are on the Rhine drainage basin.

Lorraine has an oceanic climate with continental influences.

== Paleontology ==
Lorrainosaurus, a pliosaurid from the Middle Jurassic (Bajocian) deposits, was discovered in Lorraine and named after this region in 2023.

== Language and culture ==
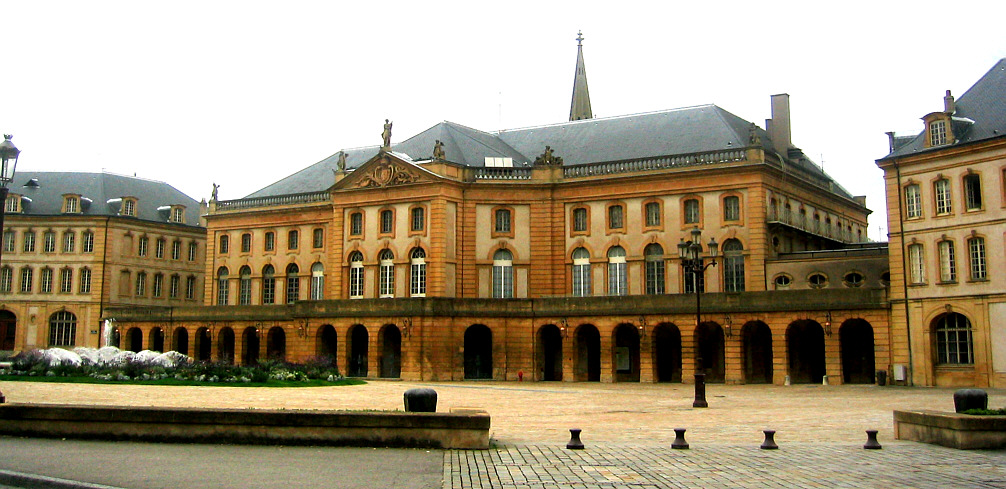
Opéra-Théâtre de Metz

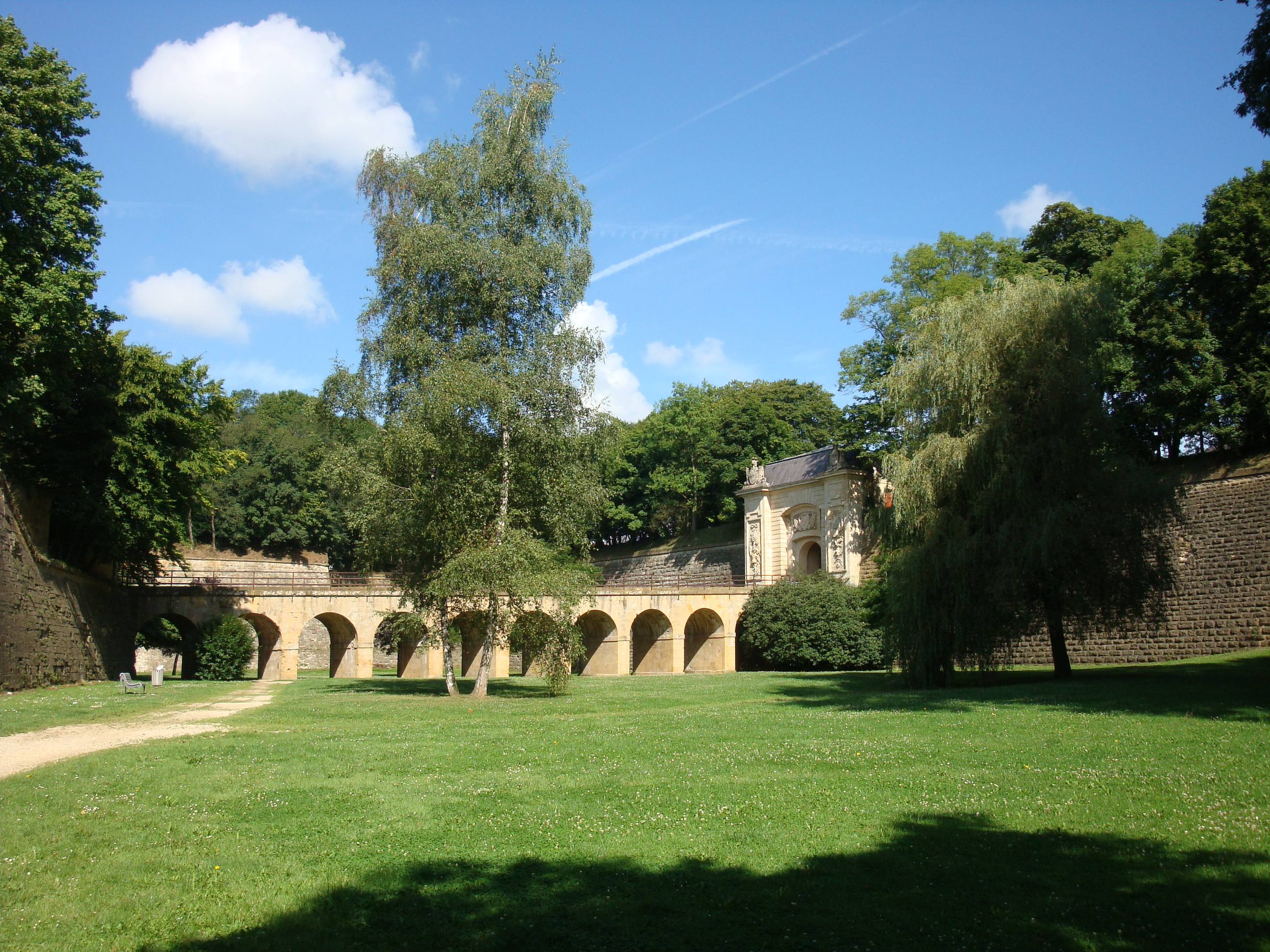
Fortifications in Longwy, inscribed on the World Heritage list by UNESCO as part of the Fortifications of Vauban

Most of Lorraine has a clear French identity, with the exception of the northeastern part of the region, today known as Moselle, which historically has had a Franconian-speaking population in its northern half.

In 1871, Bismarck annexed about a third of today's Lorraine to the new federation of the German Empire following a decisive victory in the Franco-Prussian War. This disputed third has a culture not easily classifiable as either French or German, since both Romance and German dialects are spoken here. Like many border regions, Lorraine was a patchwork of ethnicities and dialects not mutually intelligible with either standard French or German (see linguistic boundary of Moselle).

Traditionally, two languages are native to Lorraine. The first is Lorrain, which is a moribund minority Romance language that is spoken in southeastern Lorraine. The second is the German dialect of Lorraine Franconian, a group of three Franconian dialects independently surviving in northern and western Lorraine. They are referred to collectively as Plàtt in Franconian or francique or platt (lorrain) in French (not to be confused with Lorrain, the Romance language). Now mainly rural and isolated, these dialects gradually differ in the region, though they are mutually intelligible. Lorraine Franconian is distinct from neighbouring Alsatian, to the south, although the two are often confused. Neither of them has official status where they are spoken, but Alsatian is far more widely used.

Technically, Lorraine Franconian is a catch-all term for what were historically three dialects: Luxembourgish, Mosel Franconian, and Rhine Franconian. Each is identical to the same dialects spoken in the neighboring Rhineland of Germany.

Like most of France's regional languages (e.g. Basque, Breton, West Flemish, Catalan, Provençal, and Alsatian which is close to dialects of its neighboring Lorraine), Lorrain and Lorraine Franconian have largely been replaced in use by French. For more than a century, nationalistic policies of the central government required public schooling to be conducted only in French. Now, however, there are efforts being made to revive Lorraine Franconian, whose linguistic vitality is still relatively high. Recent efforts include the use of bilingual signs in Franconian areas, and Franconian-language classes for young children whose parents can no longer speak their ancestral language.

=== Cross of Lorraine ===
Cross of Lorraine

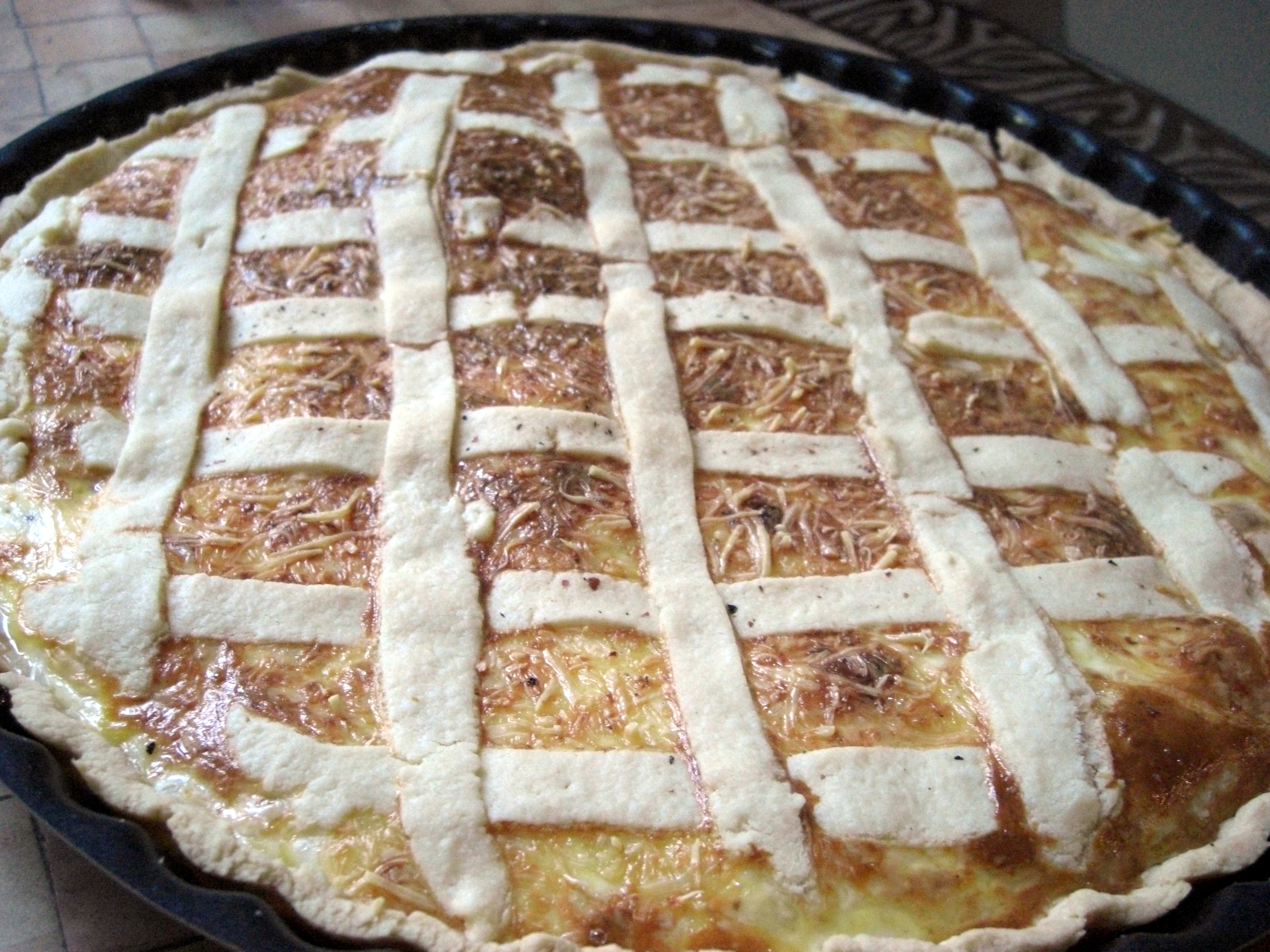
A quiche Lorraine

During World War II, the cross was adopted as the official symbol of the Free French Forces (French: Forces Françaises Libres, or FFL) under Charles de Gaulle. Georges Thierry d'Argenlieu suggested the adoption of the Cross of Lorraine as the symbol of the Free French.

In his General Order No. 2 of 3 July 1940, Vice-Admiral Émile Muselier, chief of the naval and air forces of the Free French for two days, created the bow flag displaying the French colours with a red Cross of Lorraine, and a cockade also featuring the Cross of Lorraine.

De Gaulle is memorialised at his home village of Colombey-les-Deux-Églises by a gigantic 44.3-meter (145 feet) high Cross of Lorraine.

=== Cuisine ===
The use of the potato in Lorraine can be traced back to 1665. It was imported to Europe from South America. It is used in what developed as various traditional dishes of the region, such as the potée lorraine. The Breux potato, which takes its name from the village of Breux in the north of the Meuse, is considered to be excellent because of the perfect conditions of the area for its cultivation.

Smoked bacon is also a traditional ingredient of the cuisine of Lorraine. It is used in various traditional dishes of the region, including the famous quiche Lorraine. The mirabelle plum of Lorraine is the emblematic fruit of Lorraine. It is used in pies and other desserts, as well as in alcoholic beverages.

Traditional dishes in the region include:

- Quiche Lorraine
- Pâté lorrain
- Potée Lorraine
- Andouille (tripe sausage)

Traditional cheeses of Lorraine include: Carré de l'Est, Brouère, Munster-géromé, Tourrée de l'Aubier.

Desserts from the region include: madeleine, macaron, rum baba, plombières ice-cream, various pie recipes (brimbelles bilberry, mirabelle plum, rhubarb, quark etc.). The Christstollen is also popular in Lorraine during the Christmas season.

=== Beverages ===
- Wine: The best-known wine of the region is the Côtes de Toul. There are vineyards in the valley of the Moselle, the valley of Seille, the valley of Metz, and the valley of Sierck.
- Beer: Historically, Lorraine was the location of many breweries. The Champigneulles brewery, founded on 20 June 1897, is the last remaining large-scale brewery. In 2016, it was the second largest brewer in France, after Kronenbourg.

=== Traditions ===
Lorraine has a Roman Catholic heritage. Almost every village has a church, often centuries old, although many do not have a dedicated priest any more. Church bells are traditionally rung to announce Angelus time (and often toll the hours). By tradition, they do not toll during Holy Week preceding Easter. Instead, the children of the villages play ratchets and announce, C'est l'Angélus! (It's the Angelus). After Easter, the children go from house to house and receive small presents for their service.

Sinterklaas is celebrated in Lorraine, where he is called "Saint Nicolas". Each year, more than 150,000 people gather in the streets of Nancy to celebrate Sinterklaas. A total of that number gather in other areas across the region.

=== Housing ===
Except for dispersed settlement in the Vosges mountains, traditional farms display linked houses, forming linear villages. They are built quite far from the road. The area between the house and the road is called l'usoir. Until the 1970s, the usoir was used to store farming tools, firewood, or manure. Today this area is generally used as a garden or for car parking.

Furniture developed a specific identity after the Thirty Years' War: the "Lorrain style".

== Economy ==
At €44 billion (in 2000), Lorraine generates 3.4% of France's GDP. Despite ranking 11th in population, it ranks 8th in GDP out of the 22 regions of France, making it per capita among the top economic producing regions in the country, along with Alsace and Île-de-France (Paris). The logistics and service sectors have experienced the strongest growth in recent years. The traditional industries (textiles, mining, metallurgy) have undergone a decline due to restructuring and the move of some jobs offshore. Consequently, the region has struggled with rising unemployment, although its rate is still below the national average. In 1997 the last iron ore mine in Lorraine was closed; it had once produced more than 50 million tonnes of iron. After more than a century of coal extraction, the last of the coal mines in the French area of the Saar-Lorraine basin closed in 2004 but the area is an important target for production of coalbed methane.

	Lorraine	France
GDP in 2000	€44.3 billion	€1.816 trillion
Agriculture	2.5%	2.8%
Industry	30.7%	25.6%
Service	66.8%	71.6%
Unemployment in June 2002	8.4%	9%

== Major communities ==
- Épinal
- Forbach
- Lunéville
- Metz
- Montigny-lès-Metz
- Nancy
- Saint-Dié-des-Vosges
- Sarreguemines
- Vandœuvre-lès-Nancy
- Thionville

== Fauna and flora ==
=== Fauna ===
- Fox
- European wolf
- European Wildcat felis silvestris

=== Flora ===
- Ash tree
- Beech
- Buxus boxwood
- Fern
- Geranium
- Hornbeam
- Lily of the Valley
- Maple
- Mirabelle
- Sage
- Spruce
- Thistle

== Notable people ==
=== Art and literature ===
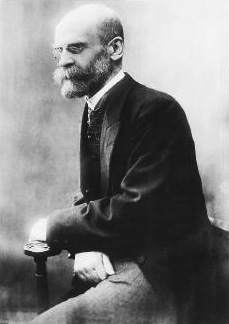
Émile Durkheim

- Jacques Callot (1592–1635)
- Georges de La Tour (1593–1652)
- Claude Lorrain (1600–1682)
- Émile Erckmann (1822–1899)
- Alexandre Chatrian (1826–1890)
- Paul Verlaine (1844–1896)
- Émile Jules Gallé (1846–1904)
- Jules Bastien-Lepage (1848–1884)
- Eugène Vallin (1856–1922)
- Émile Durkheim (1858–1917) (pictured)
- Victor Prouvé (1858–1943)
- Louis Majorelle (1859–1926)
- Lucien Weissenburger (1860–1929)
- Émile Friant (1863–1932)
- Paul Charbonnier (1865–1953)
- Henri Bergé (1870–1937)
- Jacques Grüber (1870–1936)
- Émile André (1871–1933)
- Jean-Marie Straub (1933–)
- Bernard-Marie Koltès (1948–1989)
- Philippe Claudel (1962–)
- Katia Astafieff (1975–)

=== Economy and industry ===
- Albert Bergeret (1859–1932)
- Auguste (1853–1909) and Antonin Daum (1864–1930)

=== Military ===
- Godfrey de Bouillon (1060–1100)
- Georges Mouton (1770–1838)
- Jean Baptiste Eblé (1758–1812)
- Nicolas Oudinot (1767–1848)
- Joseph Léopold Sigisbert Hugo (1774–1828)
- Louis-Hubert Lyautey (1854–1934)
- Charles Mangin (1866–1925)

=== Musicians and actors ===
- Florent Schmitt (1870–1958)
- Darry Cowl (1925–2006)
- Charlélie Couture (1956–)
- Tom Novembre (1959–)
- Patricia Kaas (1966–)

=== Politicians ===
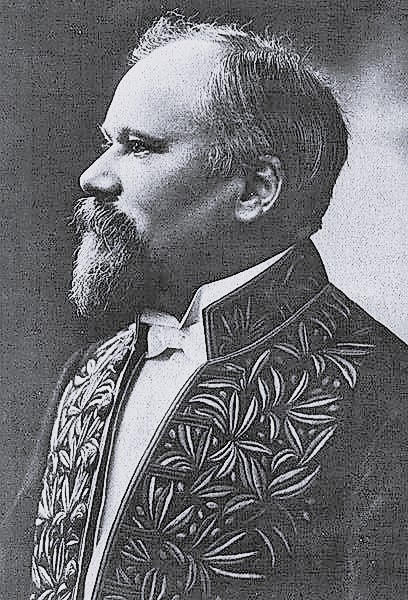
Raymond Poincaré

- Pierre-Louis Roederer (1754–1835)
- Jules Ferry (1832–1893)
- Raymond Poincaré (1860–1934) (pictured to the right)
- Maurice Barrès (1862–1923)
- Albert Lebrun (1871–1950)
- Robert Schuman (1886–1963)
- Jack Lang (1939–)
- Christian Poncelet (1928–2020) (French politician, President of the Senate 1998–2008)
- Aurélie Filippetti (1973–)

=== Religion ===
- Bruno d'Eguisheim-Dagsbourg, also known as Pope Leo IX (1002–1054)
- Henri Grégoire (1750–1831)
- Joan of Arc (1412–1431)

=== Sciences ===
- Benoit de Maillet (1656–1738)
- Charles Messier (1730–1817)
- Jean-François Pilâtre de Rozier (1757–1785)
- Jean-Victor Poncelet (1788–1867)
- Charles Hermite (1822–1901)
- Edmond Laguerre (1834–1886)
- Henri Poincaré (1854–1912)
- Marie Marvingt (1875–1963)
- Louis Camille Maillard (1878–1936)
- Hubert Curien (1924–2005)

=== Sport ===
- Michel Platini (1955–)
- Patrick Battiston (1957–)
- Morgan Parra (1988–)

=== Miscellaneous ===
- Antoine de Ville (1450–1523)
- Raymond Schwartz (1894–1973)
- Brother Athanase-Emile (1880–1952)
- Nicolas Chopin (1771–1844)
- Pierre Gaxotte (1895–1982)

== See also ==
- Alsace
- Alsace–Lorraine
- Belgian Lorraine
- Côtes de Toul
- List of rulers of Lorraine
- Lorraine (duchy)
- Lotharingia
- Saar-Warndt coal mining basin
