= Carreau Wendel Museum =

Museum in Moselle, France

Coordinates: 49.2081°N 6.8576°E

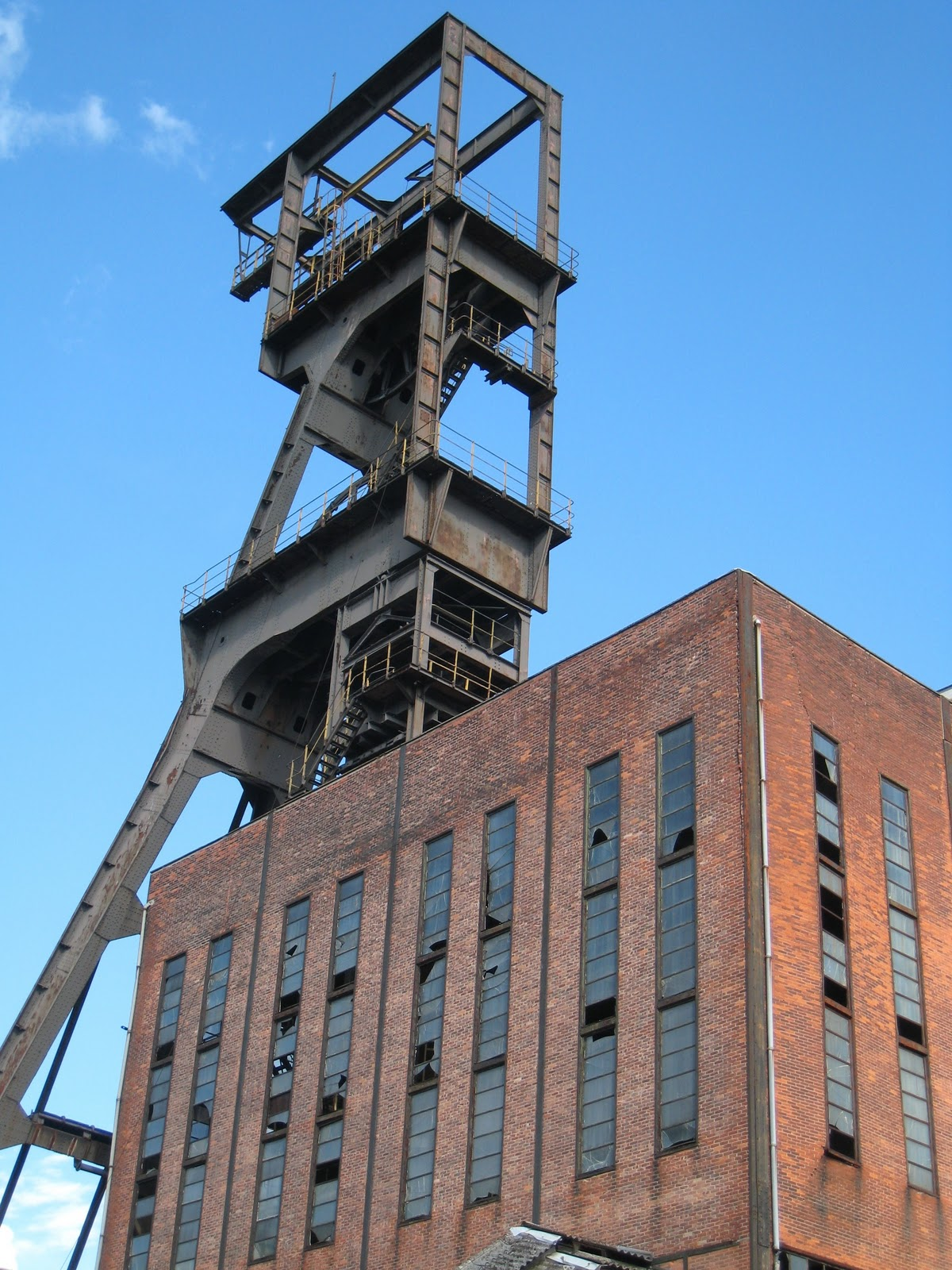

The Carreau Wendel Museum (Note: Carreau translates to pithead or pitbank in English) is the museum of the Wendel-Vuillemin coal pit, in Petite-Rosselle on the Saarland, Lorraine border (Saar-Warndt coal mining basin). Though often in Germany, since 1945 it has been in Moselle department France. The museum is an Anchor point on the European Route of Industrial Heritage.

== History ==
The Wendel 1 pit was closed in 1989, Wendel 2 in 1992 and Wendel 3 in 2001. The first piece of coal was mined in Petite-Rosselle in June 1856, at the Saint-Charles pit. These pits are in France but surrounded on three sides by the national border with Germany. Several pits were dug between 1862 and 1889: Wendel 1, Wendel 2, Vuillemin 1 and Vuillemin 2. Emile Vuillemin was the consulting engineer for Charles de Wendel and Georges Hainguerlot's company- Compagnie Anonyme des Mines de Stiring. The coal produced was primarily used to fire the Wendel steelworks. The company became - Les Petits-fils de François de Wendel et Cie in 1889.

After the Second World War, the government required the industry to triple the Lorraine coal production within ten years. In the 1946 nationalising, the Wendel assets were assigned to public company Houillères du bassin de Lorraine. The Wendel 3 pit was dug in 1952, and in 1958 was equipped with the new wash house 3. The Wendel 1 and 2 pits were modernised and equipped with new headframes. After 1960, the coal recession hit: the company modernised wash house 1–2 in 1962 by creating a new module on top of the former wash house, adapted to the existing equipment. Operations and investment continued up until 1986 when central activities ceased. Some infrastructure continued to be used up until 1989 serving other pits in the Wendel franchise.

== Museum ==
The museum is presented in several section. The simple tour shows the life of the miner and the hazardous working conditions. There is then an opportunity to take a guide tour down the workings seeing the machinery current when the last deep mine in France closed in 2004. There is an AM 100 heading machine, G210 electro-hydraulic loader, Electra 2000 shearer and ANF winning machine, roof supports etc.
