= Meurthe =

Meurthe may refer to:

- Meurthe (department), a former subdivision of France
- Meurthe (river), a river in eastern France

== See also ==
- Meurthe-et-Moselle, a current department of France
