= Meurthe (department) =

Former department of France

Coordinates: 48°35′N 6°10′E

- Department of France
- 1790–1871
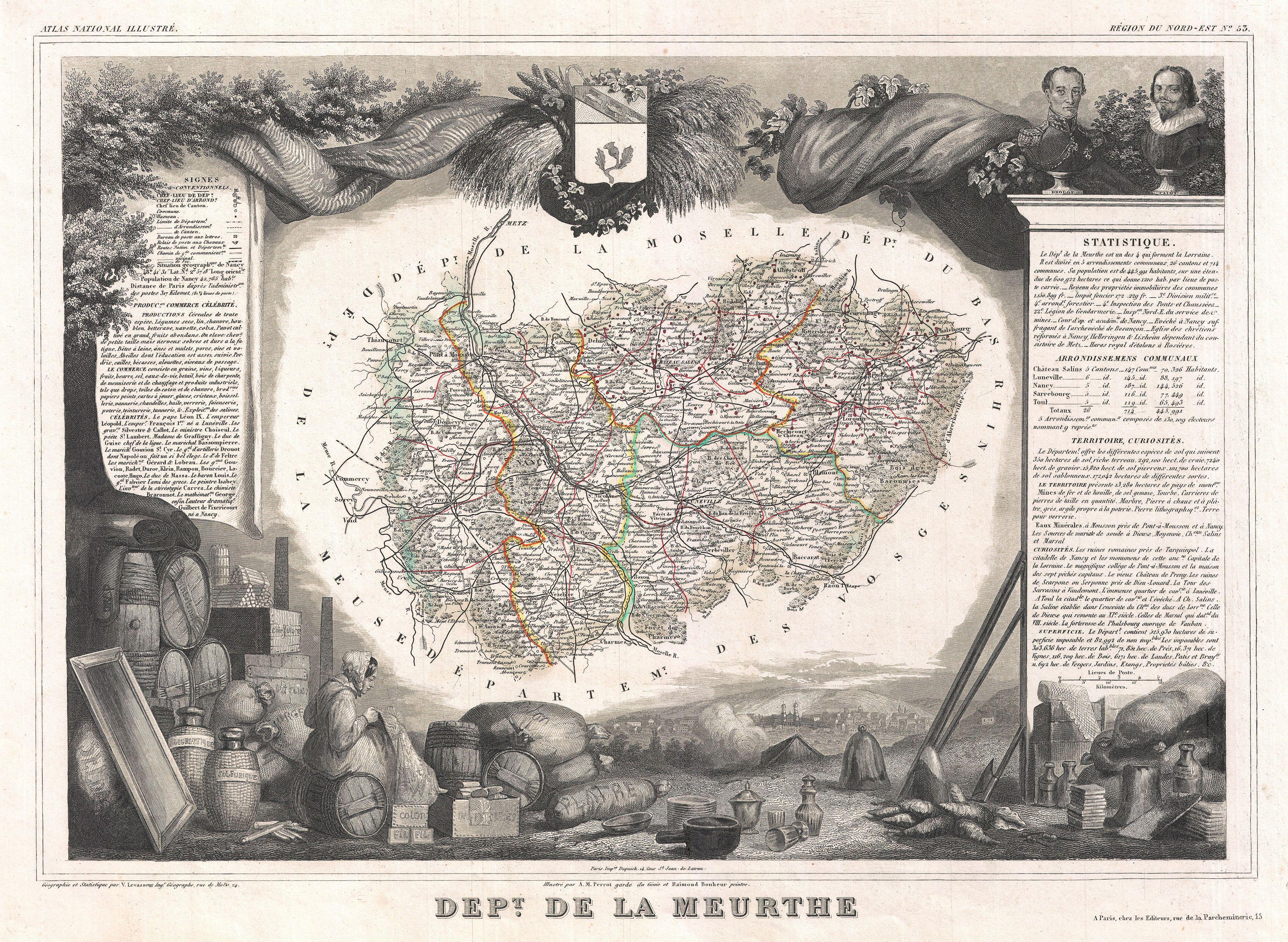
- The Meurthe department (1790–1871)
- History
  - Established: 1790
  - Disestablished: 1871
Preceded by	Succeeded by
Lorraine and Barrois	Bezirk Lothringen; Meurthe-et-Moselle

Meurthe (French pronunciation: [mœʁt]) is a former department of France created in 1790. Its prefecture (capital) was Nancy. It ceased to exist following the annexation of Alsace-Lorraine by Germany in 1871.

== General characteristics ==
The department of Meurthe was created on 4 March 1790, during the French Revolution, out of a part of the former province of Lorraine. It took its name from the river Meurthe flowing through it.

As of 1866, Meurthe had 714 communes. Its area was 6,070 km^{2} (2,340 sq mi). It was divided into 5 arrondissements: Nancy, Château-Salins, Lunéville, Sarrebourg and Toul.

== History ==
The departments of Alsace and Lorraine

After the French defeat in the Franco-Prussian War of 1870–1871, the northeastern part of the Meurthe department was annexed to the German Empire by the Treaty of Frankfurt. On 18 May 1871 about one-third of the Meurthe, corresponding approximately to the arrondissements of Château-Salins and Sarrebourg in the northeast of the department, were detached from Meurthe and annexed to the German Department of Lorraine, becoming part of the Reichsland of Alsace-Lorraine.

The remaining two thirds of Meurthe were merged with one fifth of the Moselle department (arrondissement of Briey, in the extreme west of Moselle, to the northwest of Meurthe) which had escaped German annexation, and on 7 September 1871 the merger gave birth to the new Meurthe-et-Moselle department (area: 5,246 km^{2}, compared to 6,070 km^{2} for the former Meurthe), with its prefecture at Nancy.

In 1919, with the Allied victory in the First World War, Alsace-Lorraine was returned to France by Germany at the Treaty of Versailles. However, the old departments of Meurthe and Moselle was not recreated by reverting to the old department borders of before 1871. Instead, Meurthe-et-Moselle was left untouched, and the one-third of Meurthe and the four-fifths of Moselle that had been formed the German region of Lorraine in 1871 were reinstituted as the new department of Moselle, which shares the name of the old department of Moselle but which has quite different borders.

== Population ==
At the 1866 French census, the Meurthe department had a population of 428,387 inhabitants. In 1872, after the annexation and merger, the new Meurthe-et-Moselle department had a population of 365,137 inhabitants.

At the 1999 French census, if Meurthe still existed it would have had a population of 647,307 inhabitants. On the other hand, in 1999 Meurthe-et-Moselle had a population of 713,779 inhabitants (the industrial area of Briey and Longwy merged in 1871 is more populated than the rural areas of Château-Salins and Sarrebourg lost in 1871).

== See also ==
- Meurthe (river)
- Former departments of France
- Henri Deutsch de la Meurthe - pioneering industrialist whose father invented the de la Meurthe suffix.
