= Brother Athanase-Emile =

Louis-Arthur Ritman (1880–1952) was born to a French-speaking family in Lorraine, which was, at the time, annexed by Germany. He joined the De La Salle Brothers at the age of 16 and eventually rose to become the superior general of the order from 1946 until his death in 1952.

As a young brother, he witnessed the "expulsion" of the de La Salle brothers from France in 1904. From 1920 to 1936, he worked at the Mother House in Belgium, as director of the international junior novitiate and visitor general for novitiates in England, Ireland, German, and Austria, among other jobs. In addition to native French and German, he also became fluent in English and Spanish. He commented that "As head of this house, I need to concern myself with everything from the Superior General right down to the smallest calf just born on the farm."

By 1934, he was asked to serve of the order's general council.

Brother Athanase-Emile was elected superior general of the De La Salle Brothers in 1946.

Major events of his generalate were the beatification of Brother Benildus in 1948 and the tercentenary celebrations of the birth of St. John Baptist de La Salle in 1951, which included Pope Pius XII proclaiming John Baptist de La Salle the patron of all teachers.

At the time of his death, de La Salle Brothers where in 77 different countries with 14,747 professed religious and 5,450 aspirants of 62 different nationalities, teaching 500,000 boys.
