= Duchy of Lorraine =

Part of East Francia and Holy Roman Empire

Coordinates: 48.69°N 6.18°E

Duchy of Lorraine Duché de Lorraine (French) Herzogtum Lothringen (German) Herzogtum Loutrengen (Luxembourgish)
- 959–1766
- Above: Flag (1300–1766); Below: Standard during the Thirty Years' War Coat of arms (1300–1766)
- Motto: Un pour tout/Une pour toutes (French) "One for everything"/"One for all"
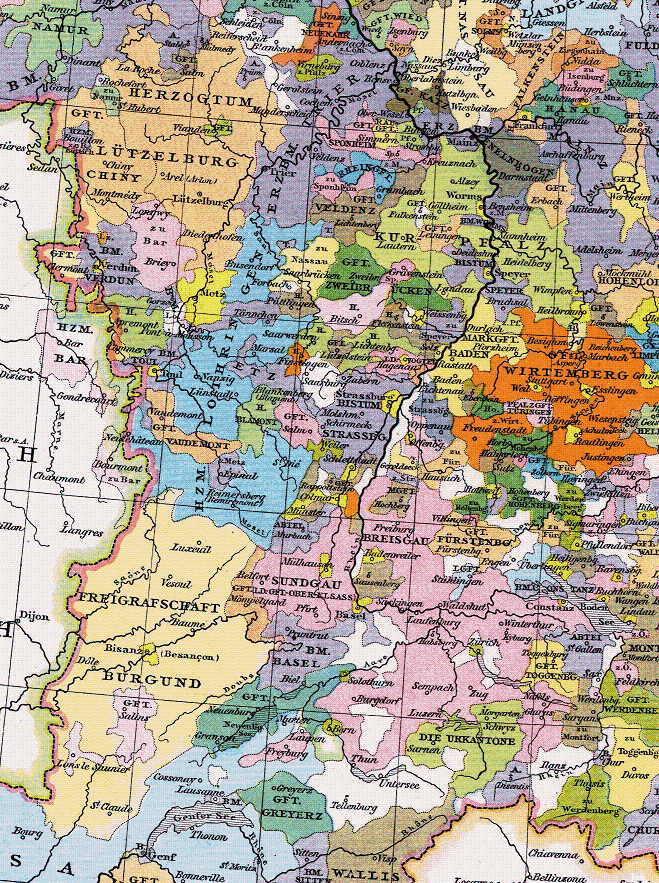
- Duchy of Lorraine (light blue; centre-left) within the Holy Roman Empire (c. 1400)
- Status: Part of the Kingdom of Germany (from 959) and State of the Holy Roman Empire (from 962)
- Capital: Nancy
- Religion: Roman Catholicism
- Demonym: Lorrainian
- Government: Duchy
- Duke
  - 959–978: Frederick I of Bar
  - 1737–1766: Stanisław Leszczyński
- History
  - Lotharingia divided: 959
  - Briefly reunited with Lower Lorraine under Giselbert I: 1033-1044
  - Joined Upper Rhenish Circle: 1500
  - French invasion and occupation of the Duchy of Lorraine: 1634
  - French invasion and subsequent occupation for 30 years: 1670
  - French invasion during War of the Spanish Succession: 1702
  - Annexed by France: 1766
Preceded by	Succeeded by
Lotharingia	Lorraine and Barrois
- Today part of: Belgium; France; Germany; Luxembourg

The Duchy of Lorraine, initially also known as the Duchy of Upper Lorraine, was a duchy of the Holy Roman Empire which existed from the 10th century until 1766, when it was annexed by the Kingdom of France. It gave its name to the present-day region of Lorraine in northeastern France. Its capital was Nancy.

It was founded in 959–965, following the division of the old Stem Duchy of Lotharingia into two separate duchies: Upper and Lower Lorraine, the westernmost parts of the Holy Roman Empire. The Lower duchy was dismantled by the 12th century, while Upper Lorraine in time came to be known just as the Duchy of Lorraine. The Duchy of Lorraine was coveted and briefly occupied by the dukes of Burgundy and the kings of France, but was ruled by the dukes of the House of Lorraine after 1473.

In 1737, the duchy was given to Stanisław Leszczyński, the former monarch of Polish-Lithuanian Commonwealth, who had lost his throne as a result of the War of the Polish Succession, with the understanding that it would fall to the French crown on his death. When Stanisław died on 23 February 1766, Lorraine was annexed by France and reorganized as the province of Lorraine and Barrois.

== Name ==
In Latin, the term Ducatus Lotharingiae was commonly used, thus giving rise to German term Herzogtum Lothringen, while in French it became known as Duché de Lorraine. In the Alemannic German, once spoken in the region, the -ingen suffix signified a property; thus, in a figurative sense, German term "Lotharingen" can be translated as "Land belonging to Lothair", or more simplified: Lothair's realm.

== History ==
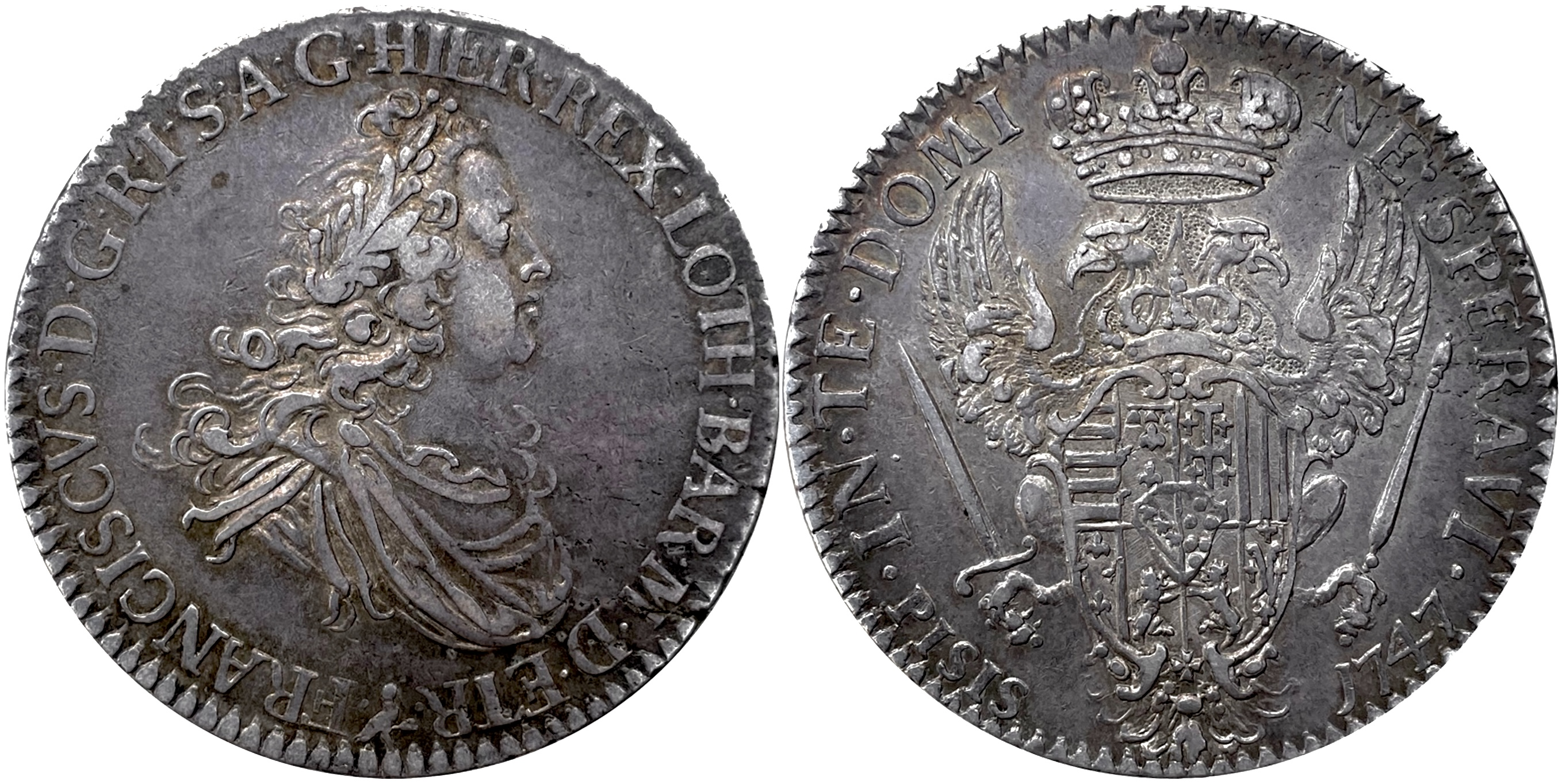
Portrait of the last Duke of Lorraine Francis Stephen on silver coin 10 paoli as he inherited Grand Duchy of Tuscany

Lorraine's predecessors were duchies and realms from the Carolingian and post-Carolingian era. The initial Mosellan duchy (Latin: Ducatum Mosselicorum) existed in the first half of the 9th century. It was followed by the old Lotharingia, a distinctive Carolingian realm ruled by kings Lothair II (855–869) and Zwentibold (895-900). That realm was transformed into the Stem Duchy of Lotharingia, that existed during the first half of the 10th century. In 953, the German king Otto I awarded the governance over the Stem Duchy of Lotharingia to his brother Bruno the Great, the Archbishop of Cologne, who thus became the Duke of Lotharingia. In 959, Bruno divided the duchy in two distinctive jurisdictions, one for the southern half (Upper Lorraine), and the other for the northern half (Lower Lorraine); this division became permanent following his death in 965, but the chronology and nature of those divisions, that resulted in the creation of two distinctive duchies, is debated among scholars.

=== Duchy of Upper Lorraine ===
Since the southern half was located further "up" the river system, it was designated as the "upper" duchy. In time, disputes over the rightful use of Lotharingian designations in ducal titles arose between two ducal centres, both of them claiming precedence. Since it was situated along the river Moselle, the southern duchy was at first also known as the Duchy of Mosellans (Latin: Ducatus Mosellanorum), and particularly during the 11th and 12th centuries (later also) its duke was commonly titled as the Duke of Mosellans (Latin: dux Mosellanorum), while the region itself was referred to as Mosellania, both in charters and narrative sources.

Lower Lorraine disintegrated into several smaller territories and only the title of a "Duke of Lothier" remained, held by Brabant. By the time Upper Lorraine came into the possession of René of Anjou, several territories had already split off, such as the County of Luxembourg, the Electorate of Trier, the County of Bar and the "Three Bishoprics" of Verdun, Metz and Toul.

The border between the Empire and the Kingdom of France remained relatively stable throughout the Middle Ages. In 1301, Count Henry III of Bar had to receive the western part of his lands (Barrois mouvant) as a fief by King Philip IV of France. In 1475, the Burgundian duke Charles the Bold campaigned for the Duchy of Lorraine, but was finally defeated and killed at the 1477 Battle of Nancy.

Following the Imperial Reform of 1500, the Duchy of Lorraine was assigned to the Upper Rhenish Circle, one of the imperial circles of the Holy Roman Empire, which were established to facilitate the Empire's administration, collective defence, and taxation.

In the 1552 Treaty of Chambord, a number of insurgent Protestant Imperial princes around Maurice, Elector of Saxony ceded the Three Bishoprics to King Henry II of France in turn for his support.

Due to the weakening of Imperial authority during the 1618–1648 Thirty Years' War, France was able to occupy the duchy in 1634 and retained it until 1661 when Charles IV was restored. In 1670, the French invaded again, forcing Charles into exile; his nephew and heir Charles V (1643–1690) spent his life in the service of the Imperial House of Habsburg. France returned the Duchy in the 1697 Treaty of Ryswick ending the Nine Years' War and Charles' son Leopold (1679–1729), became duke and was known as 'Leopold the Good;' in the 1701–1714 War of the Spanish Succession, parts of Lorraine, including the capital Nancy, were again occupied by France, but Leopold continued to reign at the Château de Lunéville.

In 1737, after the War of the Polish Succession, an agreement between France, the Habsburgs and the Lorraine House of Vaudémont assigned the Duchy to Stanisław Leszczyński, former king of Poland. He was also father-in-law to King Louis XV of France, and had recently lost out to a candidate backed by Russia and Austria in the War of the Polish Succession. The duke of Lorraine, Francis Stephen, betrothed to the Emperor's daughter Archduchess Maria Theresa, was compensated with the Grand Duchy of Tuscany, where the last Medici ruler had recently died without issue. France also promised to support Maria Theresa as heir to the Habsburg possessions under the Pragmatic Sanction of 1713. Leszczyński received Lorraine with the understanding that it would fall to the French crown on his death. The title of Duke of Lorraine was given to Stanisław, but also retained by Francis Stephen, and it figures prominently in the titles of his successors (as a non-claimant family name), the House of Habsburg-Lorraine. When Stanisław died on 23 February 1766, Lorraine was annexed by France and reorganized as a province by the French government.

Territorial evolution of (Upper) Lorraine
Lotharingia divided, around 1000 AD
Alsace, ceded to Suebia (Swabia) in 925
Upper Lorraine after 928
Lower Lorraine after 977

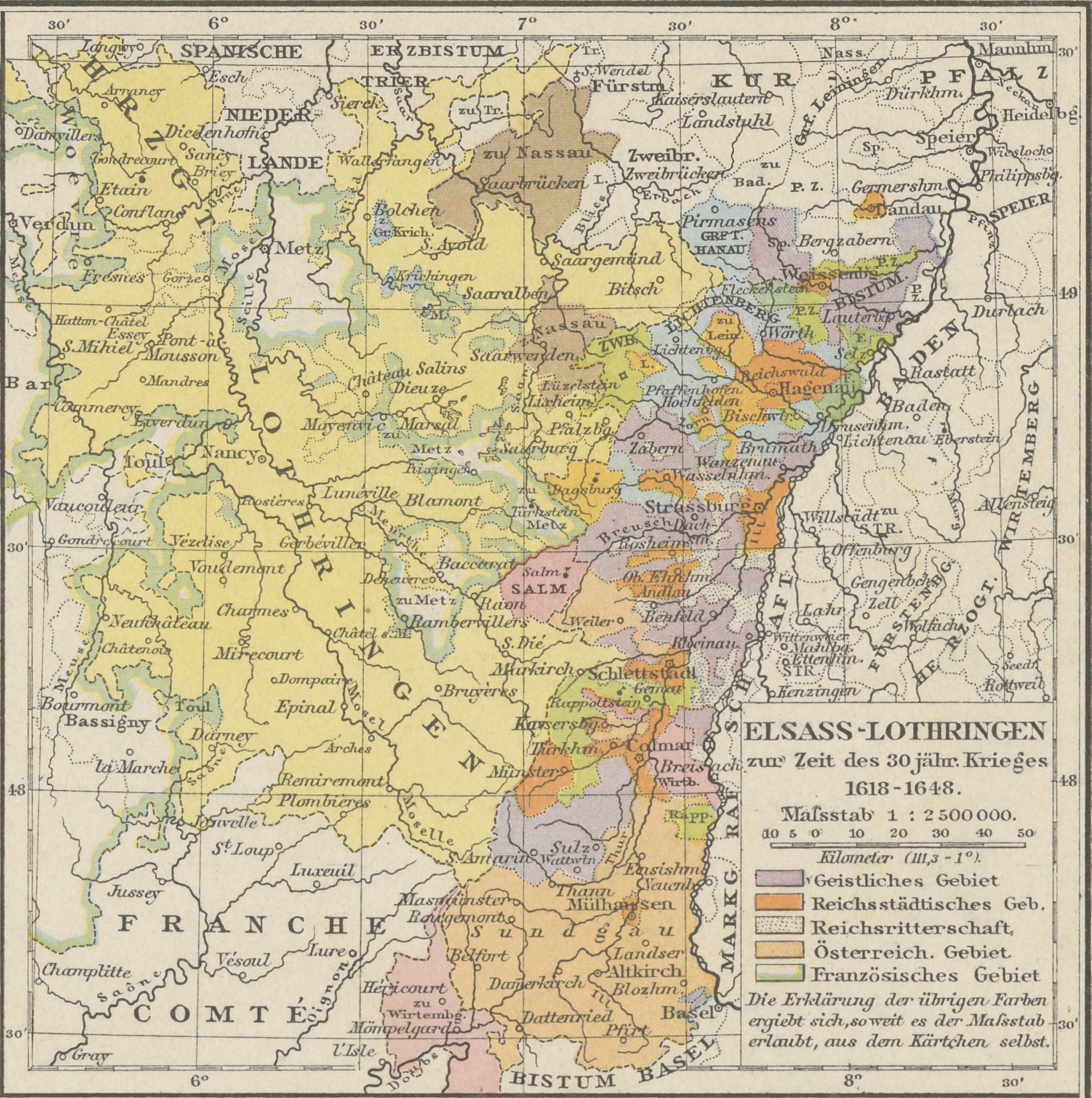
Lorraine as it was 1618–1648; Lorraine and Barrois non mouvant are shown in yellow.

Map of the Duchy of Lorraine (1756), showing its somewhat dispersed communes by region of France and Germany, for the latter the English and German term for the region is Saarland.

Map of the Duchy of Lorraine (1756) within the modern region.
Symbols and coats of arms of Lorraine
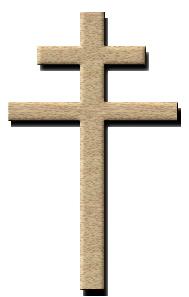
Cross of Lorraine, symbol of Lorraine since the 15th century

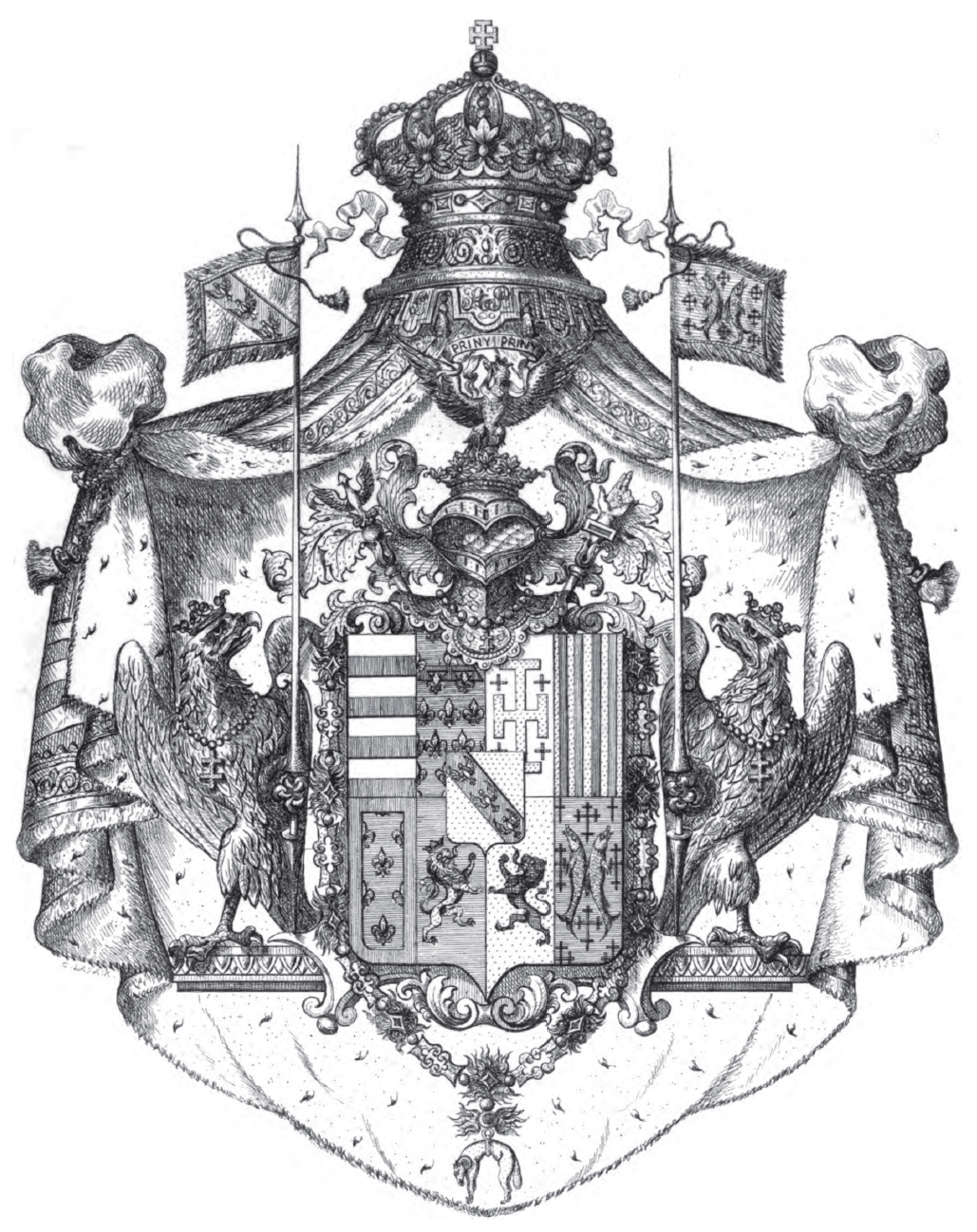
Coat of arms of the Duchy (1697)

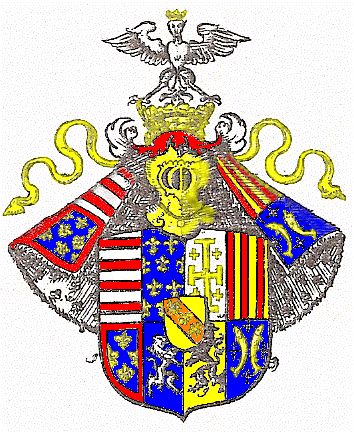
Full coat of arms of the Duchy, Siebmachers Wappenbuch, 1703

== Culture ==
Two regional languages survive in the region.

Lorraine Franconian, known as francique or platt (lorrain) in French, is a West Central German dialect spoken by a minority in the northern part of the region. This is distinct from the neighbouring Alsatian language, although the two are often confused. Neither has any form of official recognition.

Lorrain is a Romance dialect spoken by a minority in the southern part of the region.

The duchy produced a number of important painters, including Claude Lorrain, Georges de La Tour and Jean LeClerc.

Like most of France's regional languages (such as Breton, Franco-Provençal, Occitan, Alsatian, Catalan, Basque and Flemish), Lorrain and Lorraine Franconian were largely replaced by French with the advent of mandatory public schooling in the 19th and 20th centuries.

== See also ==
- List of rulers of Lorraine
- Lorraine region
- Lotharingia

== Sources ==
- MacLean, Simon (2013). "Shadow Kingdom: Lotharingia and the Frankish World, c. 850–c. 1050". History Compass. 11 (6): 443–457.
- Nelson, Janet L., ed. (1991). The Annals of St-Bertin. Manchester: Manchester University Press.
- Pernot, François (2014). "L'Europe «lotharingienne», une idée géopolitique IXe-XXIe siècles". Revue de géographie historique. 4: 3–23.
- Reuter, Timothy (2013) [1991]. Germany in the Early Middle Ages c. 800–1056. London and New York: Routledge.
- Schneider, Jens (2010). Auf der Suche nach dem verlorenen Reich: Lotharingien im 9. und 10. Jahrhundert. Köln: Böhlau Verlag.
- West, Charles (2023). The Fall of a Carolingian Kingdom: Lotharingia, 855–869. Toronto: University of Toronto Press.
