= Saar-Warndt coal mining basin =

Coal mining region of Germany and France

Lorraine basin location on French coal basins map

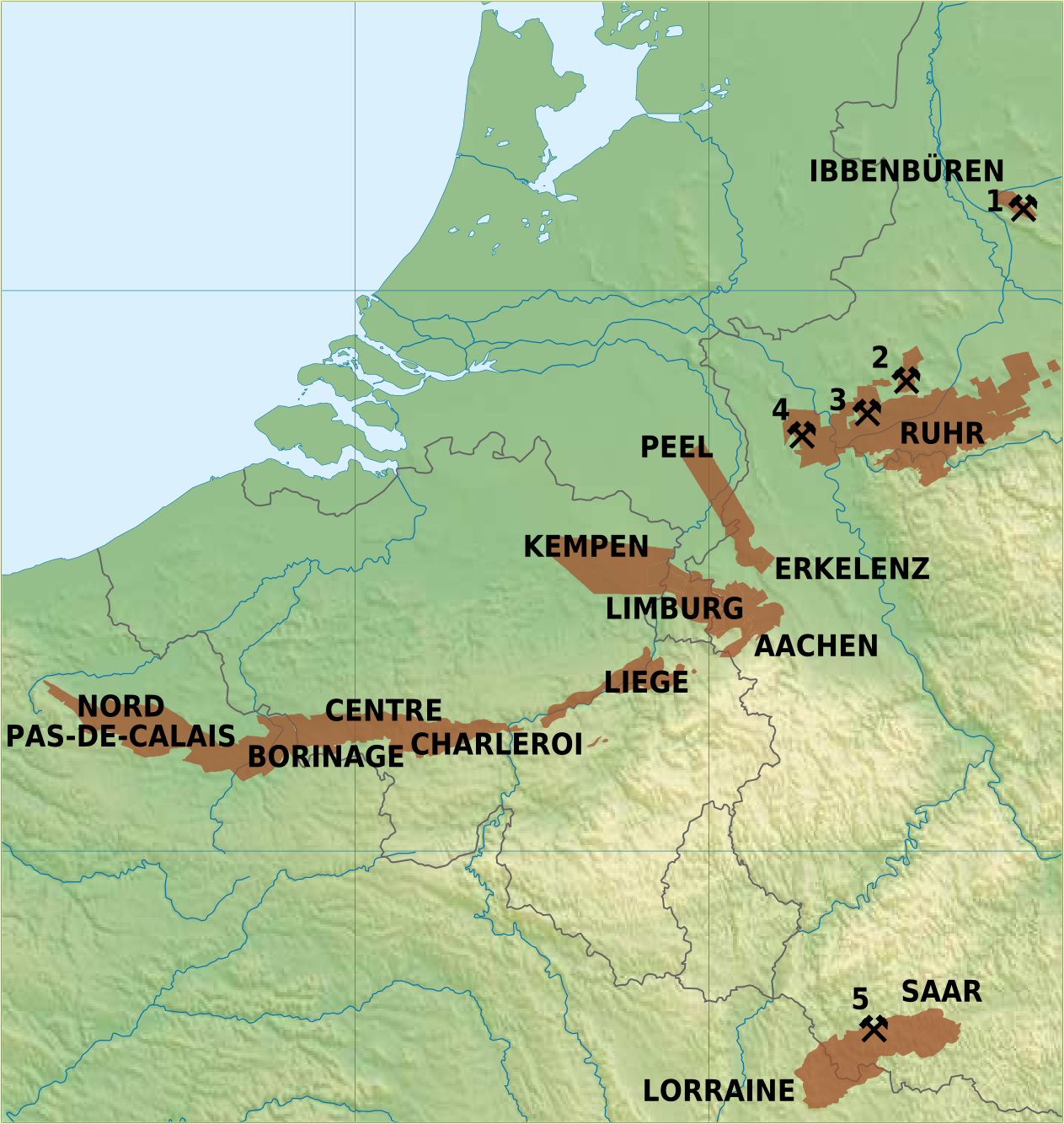
Coalfields of Germany, Belgium, The Netherlands and Northern France

Saar-Warndt coal mining basin is an area of Germany and France. It has been shaped by two centuries of coal extraction from the start of the 19th century to the start of the 21st century; and it represents a significant period in the history of European industrialisation.

== Mine operation ==
The Saar-Lorraine basin is c. 300 km long and 80 km wide. The coal is bituminous and was deposited during the Westphalian-Stephanian.

The seams are typically several metres thick. Some of the seams reach the surface on the eastern (German) side of the basin but further west they lie at depths of up to 1200m, they are strongly folded and faulted. Most of the coal was extracted by deep mining and the workings had to be pumped to manage inflow of water.

== History ==
Control over the Saar coalfield passed between France and Germany during the 1900s. After World War One it was agreed in the Treaty of Versailles to be owned by France, until a plebiscite took place 15 years later where the local citizens voted to become part of Germany. Following World War Two this area was officially returned to France, however, the Saar rejoined Germany in 1957.

This piece of land was valuable to these countries, especially during the coal-powered period of history. However, most of the coal in that area was mined when it belonged to France post-WW1.

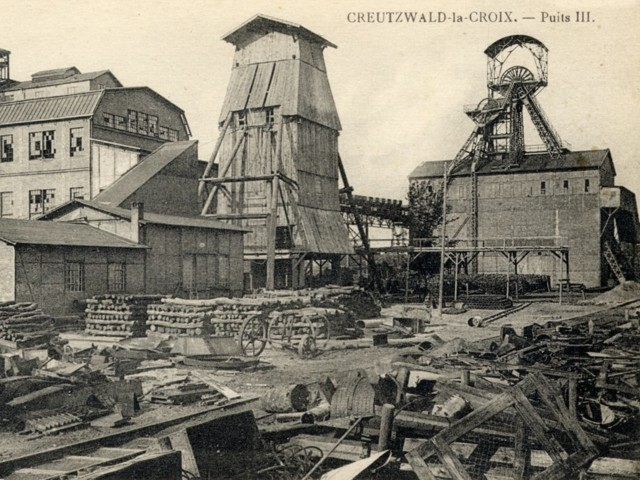
La Houve, 20th century

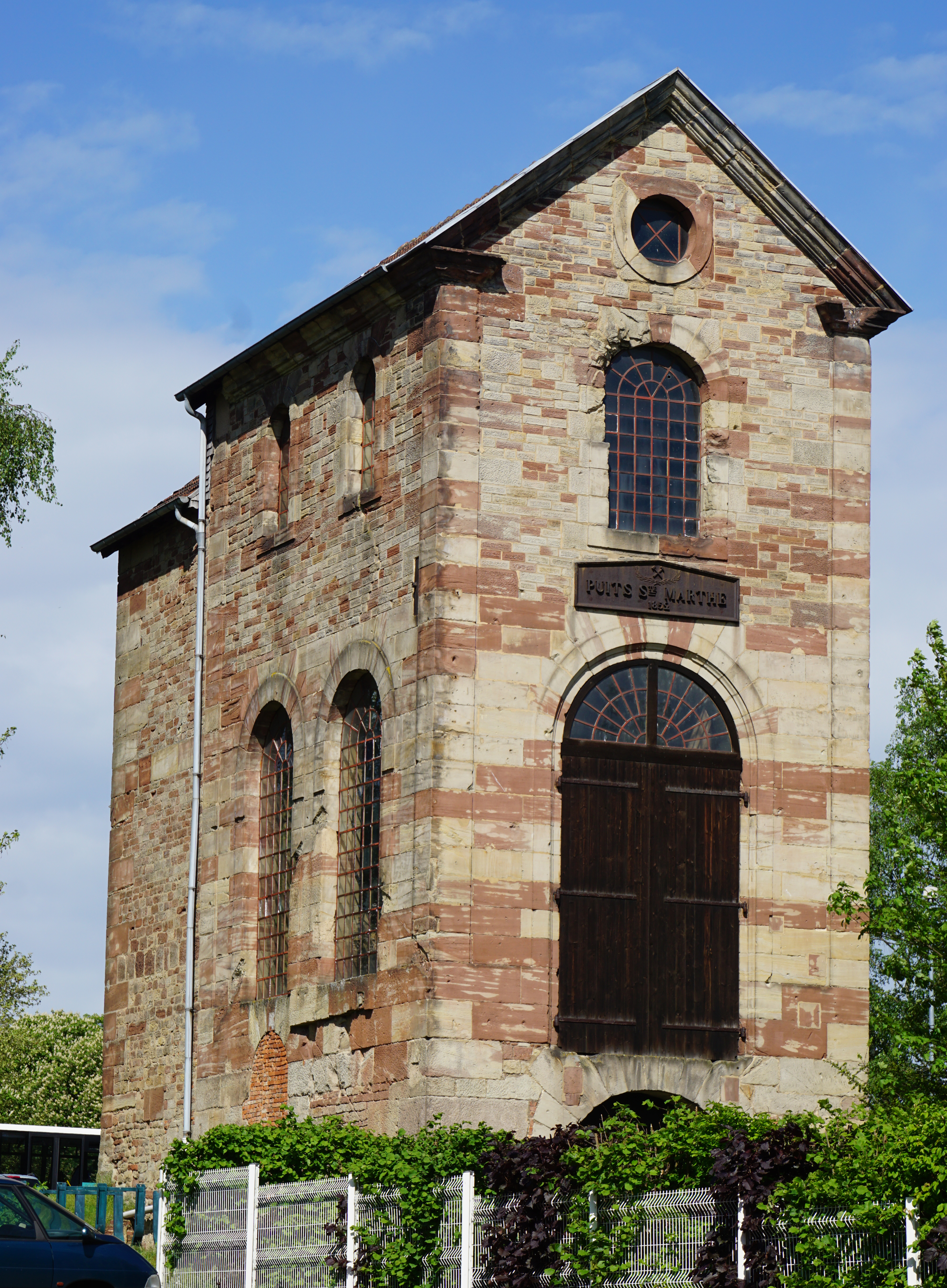
Fosse Sainte-Marte built in 1848

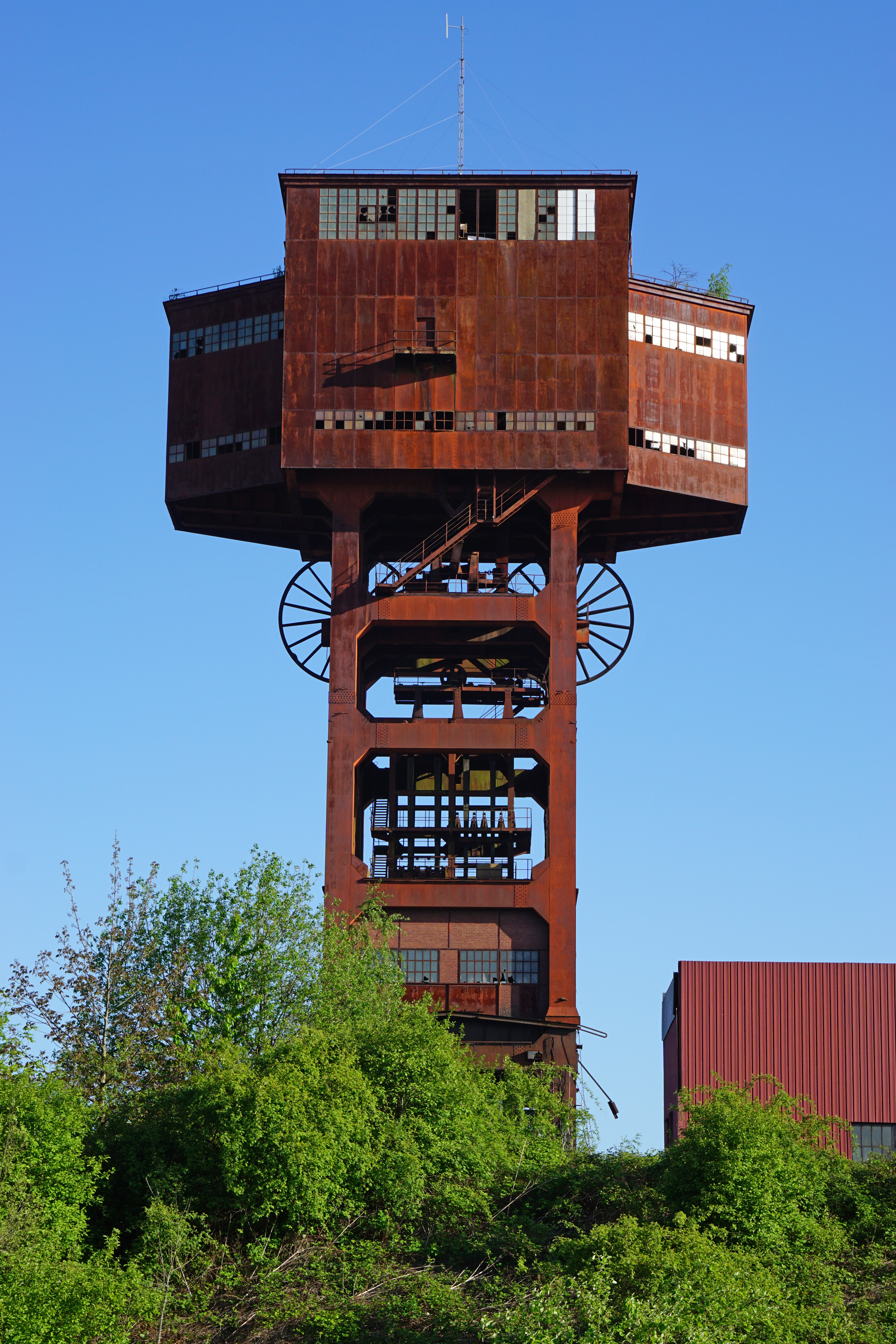
Fosse Folschviller 1

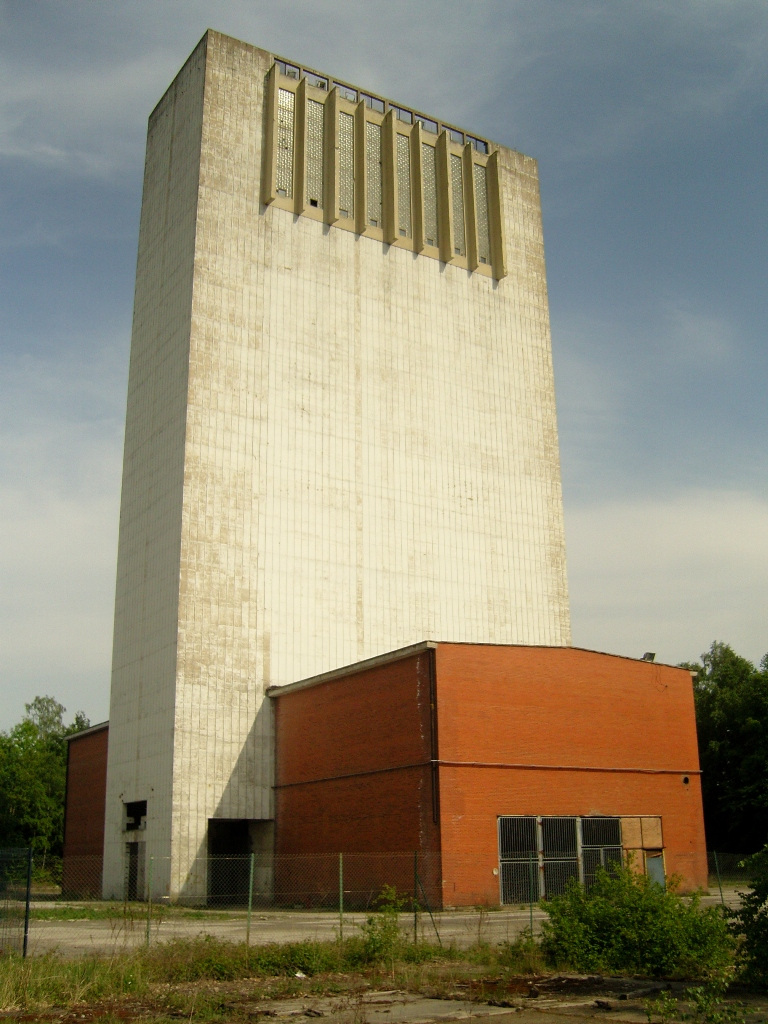
Fosse Simon 5

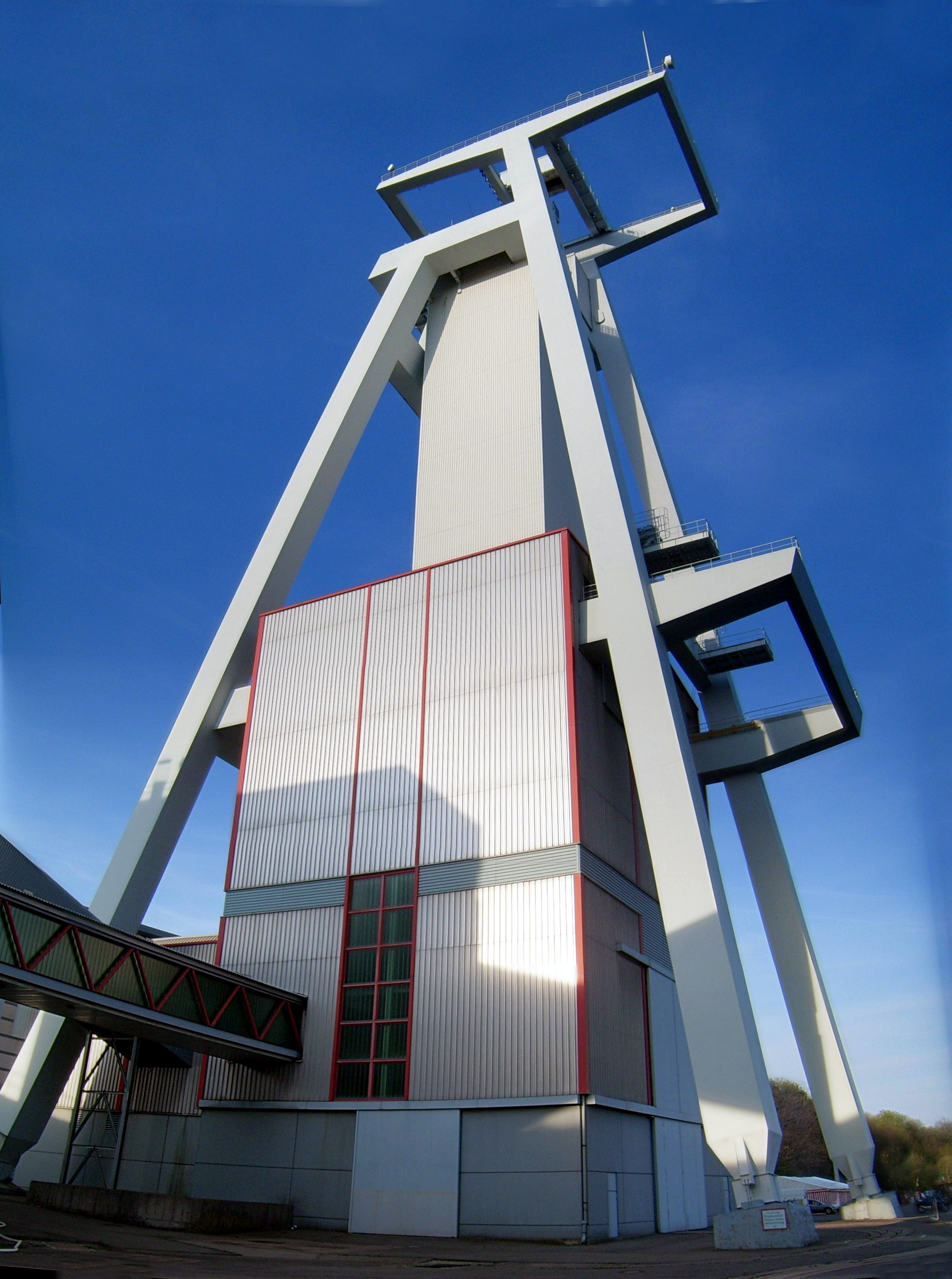
Göttelborn

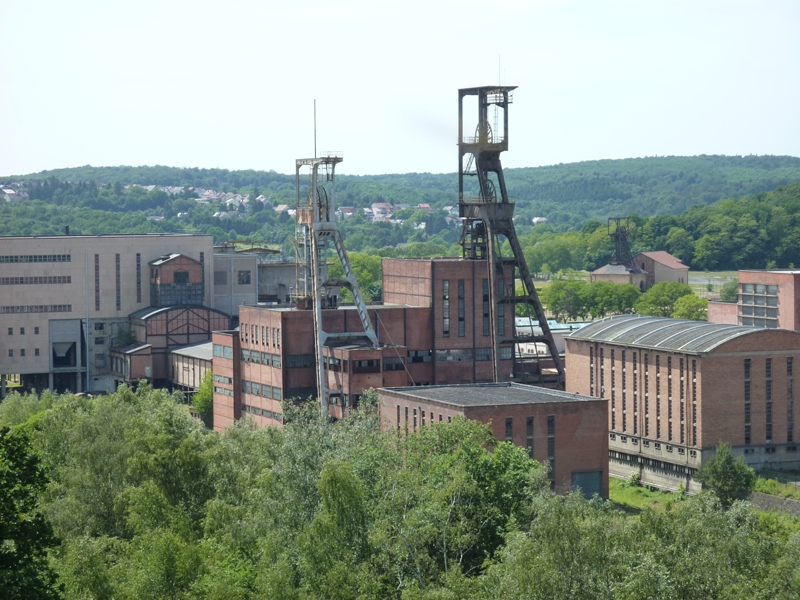
Carreau Wendel Museum

== See also ==
- Territory of the Saar Basin
- Saarland
