= Lorraine and Barrois =

Government of the Kingdom of France

Lorraine and Barrois Lorraine et Barrois
- Government of Kingdom of France
- 1766–1790
- Capital: Nancy
- History
  - Established: 1766
  - Disestablished: 1790
Preceded by
Duchy of Lorraine
Duchy of Bar
Succeeded by
Meurthe (department)
Meuse (department)
Moselle (department)
Vosges (department)

Lorraine and Barrois (French: Lorraine et Barrois) was a government of the Kingdom of France, formed in February 1766 from the duchies of Lorraine and Bar upon the death of Stanisław Leszczyński.

== History ==
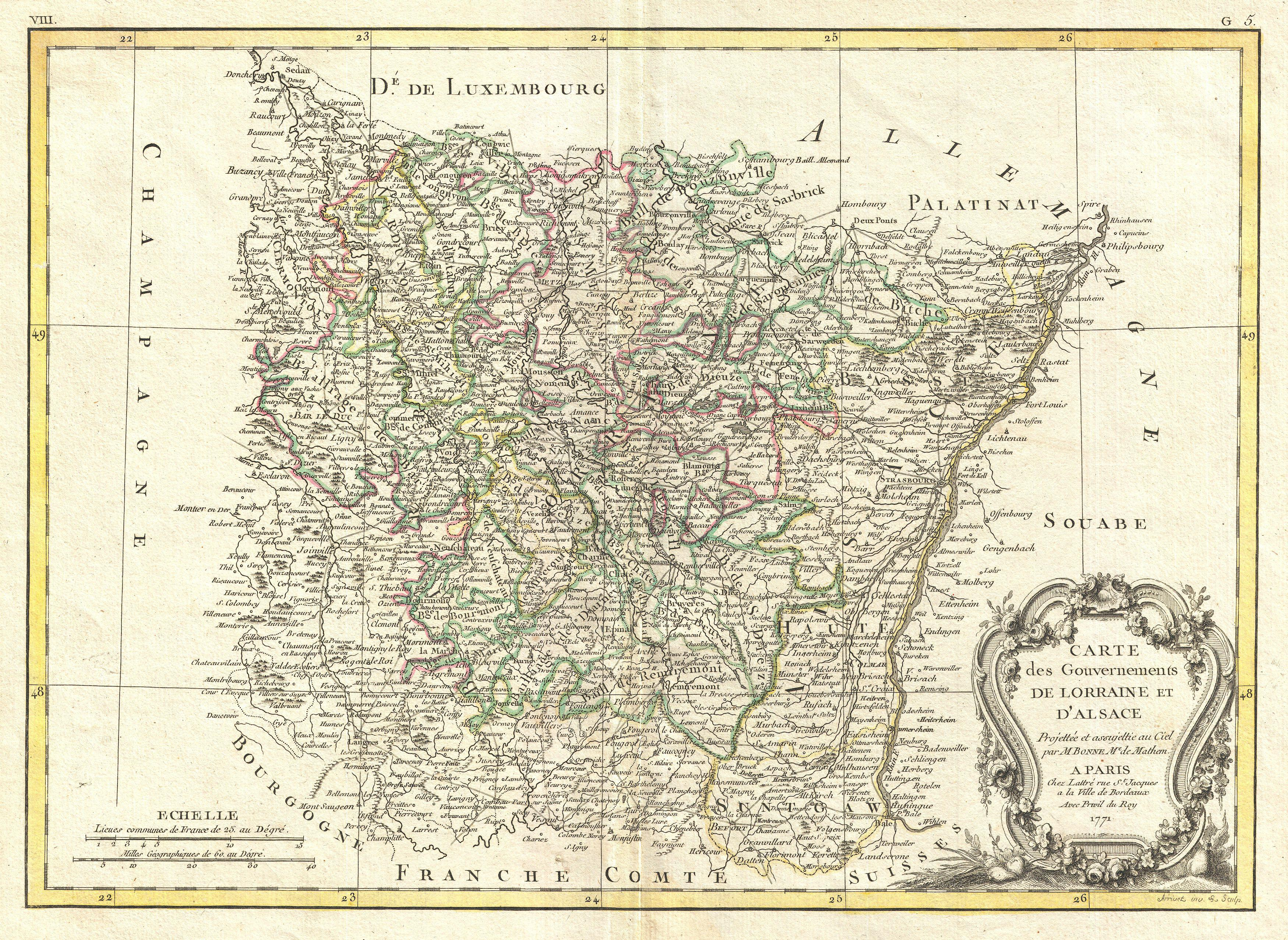
1771 map of Lorraine and Alsace by Rigobert Bonne

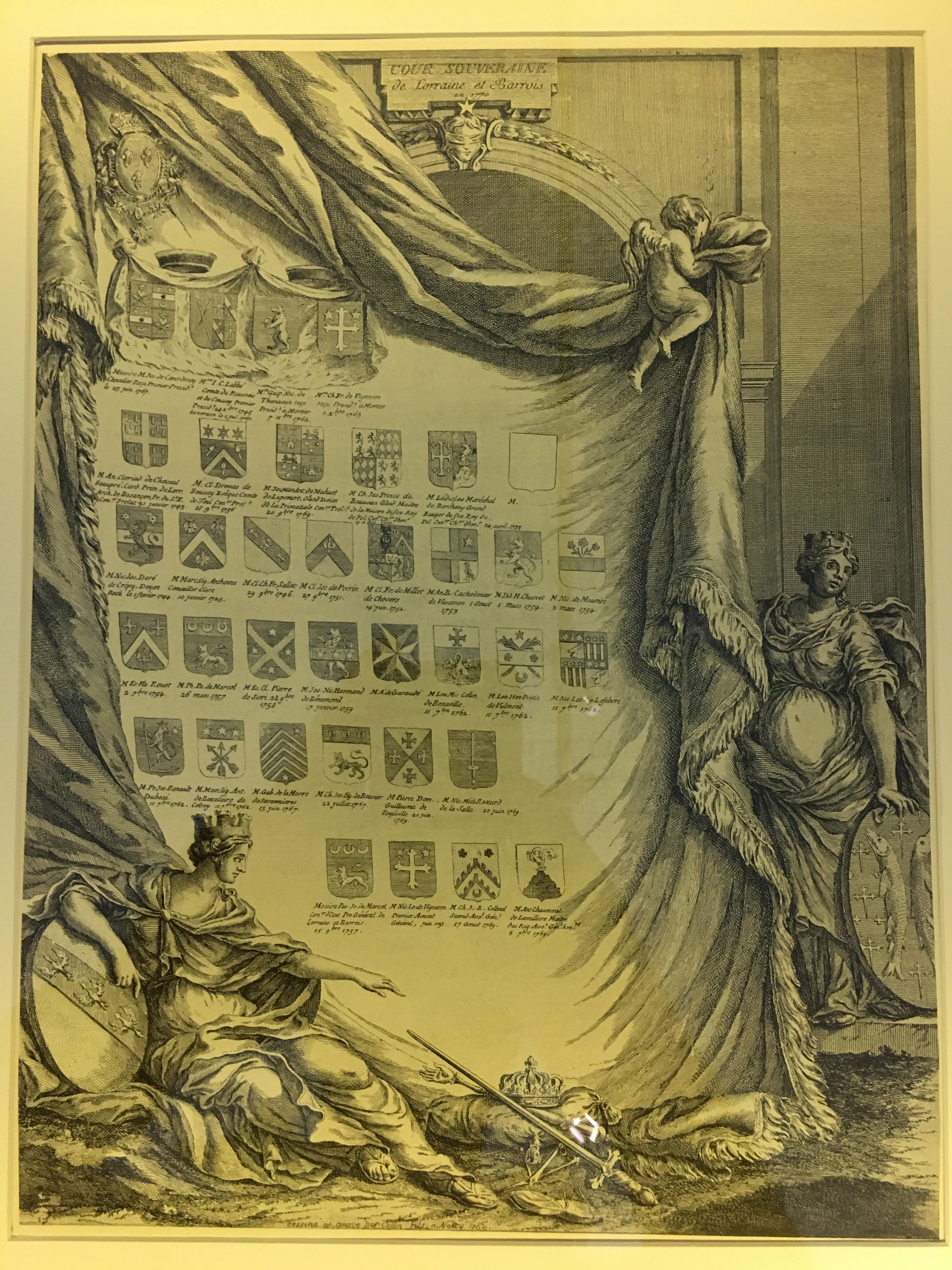
Armorial of the members of the Sovereign Court of Lorraine and Barrois

King Louis XV (r. 1715–1774) had negotiated at the preliminaries of Vienna in 1735 "an arrangement by which Francis [III, Duke of Lorraine] received the duchy of Tuscany [...] in exchange for Lorraine, and Stanislaus Leszczynski, the dethroned king of Poland and father-in-law of Louis XV., obtained Lorraine, which after his death would pass to his daughter—in other words, to France." The following year (1736), "by a secret agreement," Stanisław had "abandoned the financial administration of his estates to Louis XV. for a yearly subsidy." Both treaties, however, guaranteed the legislation of Lorraine and Barrois, "the privileges enjoyed by the three orders, and their common law and customs tariffs, which they retained until the French Revolution."

Meanwhile, the Three Bishoprics formed a little government.

Barrois mouvant (composed of the bailiwicks of Bar and Bassigny) was under the jurisdiction of the Parlement of Paris whereas Barrois non-mouvant (i.e. the Bailiwick of Saint-Mihiel) and Lorraine were subject to the Sovereign Court of Lorraine and Barrois, which became the Parliament of Nancy in 1776. There was also a chambre des comptes at Bar-le-Duc.

== Sources ==
- Poupardin, René (1911). "Lorraine" . In Chisholm, Hugh (ed.). Encyclopædia Britannica. Vol. 17 (11th ed.). Cambridge University Press. pp. 9–12.
- Simon, J.; Gérard, P. (1967). L'Armée à Nancy, 1633-1966: mélanges d'histoire militaire ... (in French). Berger-Levrault.
